= Communauté de communes des Vals de Cher et d'Arnon =

Vals de Cher et d’Arnon
- Former communauté de communes
- Country: France
- Region: Centre-Val de Loire
- Department: Cher
- No. of communes: {{{nbcomm}}}
- Established: 2000
- Disbanded: 2017
- Area: 255.78 km^{2} (98.76 sq mi)
- Population (1999): 7,688
  - Density: 30.06/km^{2} (77.85/sq mi)

The communauté de communes des Vals de Cher et d’Arnon was located in the Cher département of the Centre-Val de Loire region of France. It was created in January 2000. It was merged into the new Communauté de communes Cœur de Berry in January 2017.

It comprised the following 12 communes:

- Brinay
- Cerbois
- Chéry
- Lazenay
- Limeux
- Lury-sur-Arnon
- Massay
- Méreau
- Poisieux
- Preuilly
- Quincy
- Sainte-Thorette
