= Canton of Lury-sur-Arnon =

Coordinates: 47°7′42″N 2°3′28″E

Lury-sur-Arnon
- Former canton
- Interactive map of Lury-sur-Arnon
- Country: France
- Region: Centre-Val de Loire
- Department: Cher
- No. of communes: {{{nbcomm}}}
- Disbanded: 2015
- Area: 171 km^{2} (66 sq mi)
- Population (2012): 6,281
  - Density: 36.7/km^{2} (95.1/sq mi)

The Canton of Lury-sur-Arnon is a former canton situated in the Cher département and in the Centre region of France. It was disbanded following the French canton reorganisation which came into effect in March 2015. It consisted of 9 communes, which joined the canton of Mehun-sur-Yèvre in 2015. It had 6,281 inhabitants (2012).

== Geography ==
A farming area in the valley of the river Arnon, in the southern part of the arrondissement of Vierzon, centred on the town of Lury-sur-Arnon. The altitude varies from 95m at Méreau to 161m at Chéry, with an average altitude of 136m.

The canton comprised 9 communes:

- Brinay
- Cerbois
- Chéry
- Lazenay
- Limeux
- Lury-sur-Arnon
- Méreau
- Preuilly
- Quincy

== Population ==
Historical population Canton of Lury-sur-Arnon
Year	1962	1968	1975	1982	1990	1999
Pop.	3,896	4,115	4,294	4,827	5,455	5,513
±%	—	+5.6%	+4.3%	+12.4%	+13.0%	+1.1%
From the year 1962 on: No double counting – residents of multiple communes (e.g. students and military personnel) are counted only once. Source: INSEE

== See also ==
- Arrondissements of the Cher department
- Cantons of the Cher department
- Communes of the Cher department
