= Communauté de communes les Terres d'Yèvre =

Terres d’Yèvre
- Former communauté de communes
- Country: France
- Region: Centre-Val de Loire
- Department: Cher
- No. of communes: {{{nbcomm}}}
- Established: January 2003
- Disbanded: 2017
- Area: 76.25 km^{2} (29.44 sq mi)
- Population (1999): 10,343
  - Density: 135.6/km^{2} (351.3/sq mi)

The communauté de communes les Terres d’Yèvre was located in the Cher département of the Centre-Val de Loire region of France. It was created in January 2003. It was merged into the new Communauté de communes Cœur de Berry in January 2017.

== Member communes ==
It comprised the following 3 communes:

- Allouis
- Foëcy
- Mehun-sur-Yèvre
