= Reuilly AOC =

French wine AOC

Reuilly (French pronunciation: [ʁœji]) is an Appellation d'origine contrôlée (AOC) in the Loire Valley wine region of France, which takes its name from the Reuilly commune in the department of Indre, situated in the center of France.

== Introduction ==
The Reuilly vineyards consists of 150 hectares (370 acres) located in 7 communes: Reuilly and Diou in Indre and Lazenay, Chéry, Lury-sur-Arnon, Preuilly and Cerbois in Cher. The soils are made up of sandy-gravelly soil and clayey-chalky soil (Kimmeridgian marl). Three different grape varieties are grown: Sauvignon blanc, Pinot noir and Pinot gris. The AOC, recognized by the decree in 1937 for white wines made from Sauvignon and in 1961 for red and rosé wines made from Pinot noir and Pinot gris, is under the guardianship of the committee for regional wine and fruit brandy of the Loire Valley, within the Institut National des Appellations d'Origine (INAO), which regulate French agricultural products with appellations. Annual production is around 8,000 hectolitres.

A wine fair has been held every year at Easter since 1953.

== Sources, Bibliography ==
- Michel Mastrojanni : Les Vins de France (guide vert solar). Éditions Solar, Paris 1992 - 1994 - 1998, ISBN 2-263-02796-3
