= Tripoux =

French sheep tripe dish

Tripoux (or Tripous) is a French dish made with small bundles of sheep tripe, usually stuffed with sheep's feet, sweetbreads and various herbs and garden vegetables. There are a number of variations on this dish, but they generally all involve savoury ingredients held together with sheep tripe and braised over low heat.

This dish calls for a dry, young and fruity white wine, such as Gaillac, Sancerre, Quincy, Saint-Pourçain, Reuilly or Pouilly-sur-loire but could also go with a local red wine (Gaillac or Marcillac).

== See also ==
- List of lamb dishes
- List of stuffed dishes
- Haggis
