= Estelle Touzet =

French chef sommelier (born 1981)

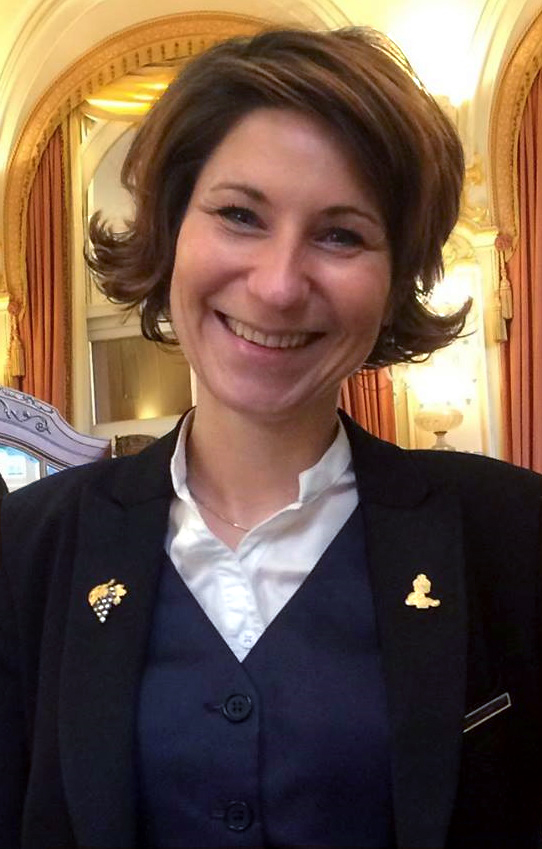
- Touzet in 2016
- Born: 1981 (age 44–45); Châteauroux
- Occupation: Sommelier
- Employer(s): Guy Savoy; Tom Aikens; Le Meurice; David Biraud; Hôtel Le Bristol Paris; Hôtel de Crillon; Hôtel Ritz Paris
- Awards: Ordre des Arts et des Lettres (2011); Order of Agricultural Merit (2019)

Estelle Touzet, born in 1981, in Châteauroux (Indre), is a French chef sommelier.

Introduced to French cuisine and wine at an early age, Estelle Touzet worked at a number of restaurants and palaces, notably in Paris. In 2010, after working at Le Meurice for two years, she became the first woman in the world to be appointed head sommelier of a three-star restaurant. In parallel, she runs a wine consultancy and lectures at several hotel schools in France.

Recognized by her peers in a predominantly male environment, Estelle Touzet is one of the few female sommeliers in France.

== Biography ==
=== Youth and education ===
Born in 1981, in Châteauroux (Indre) to parents from the Castelroussins region, Estelle Touzet learned baking and pastry-making at the age of five, from her two grandmothers in Issoudun. Her grandfathers introduced her to the wines of the Loire Valley, particularly Reuilly, Quincy, Chinon, Menetou-Salon and Sancerre, at Sunday dinners. She completed her secondary education at the Collège Les Capucins in Châteauroux. It was there that her history-geography teacher, Denis Hervier, and her German teacher, Jean-Louis Rizet, introduced her to the world of wine and gastronomy.

At the end of her third year, Estelle Touzet decided to continue her studies at the Brive-la-Gaillarde hotel school. After graduating in 1995, with a baccalauréat in hotel and catering, she went on to study for a brevet de technicien supérieur (BTS) in "hotel and catering, culinary arts, table arts and service." She spent a year in Brittany, specializing in dietetic cooking, before finishing in 2002, with a complementary mention in sommellerie at the Lycée Albert-de-Mun, in the 7th arrondissement of Paris, taught by Christine Vernay and Franck Ramage.

=== Career path ===
In 2003, she entered the job market, starting out as a chef at Château Cordeillan-Bages in the Médoc. She then worked at Guy Savoy's restaurant in Paris, then at the Bristol (2003) and Crillon (2005) Parisian palaces, alongside David Biraud. In 2006, she moved to Tom Aikens' Michelin-starred restaurant in London.

In 2008, she joined the team at Le Meurice as assistant to the head sommelier. In 2010, again at Le Meurice, she became the first woman in the world to be appointed head sommelier of a three-star restaurant. Gilles Pudlowski wrote of her: "She impresses with her liveliness, naturalness and the pertinence of her choices in a three-star restaurant where she knows how to keep her identity. [...] Thanks to her, a dream meal is good, honest, fruity and pleasurable".

Between 2014 and 2017, she was president of Gustess, a wine consulting company.

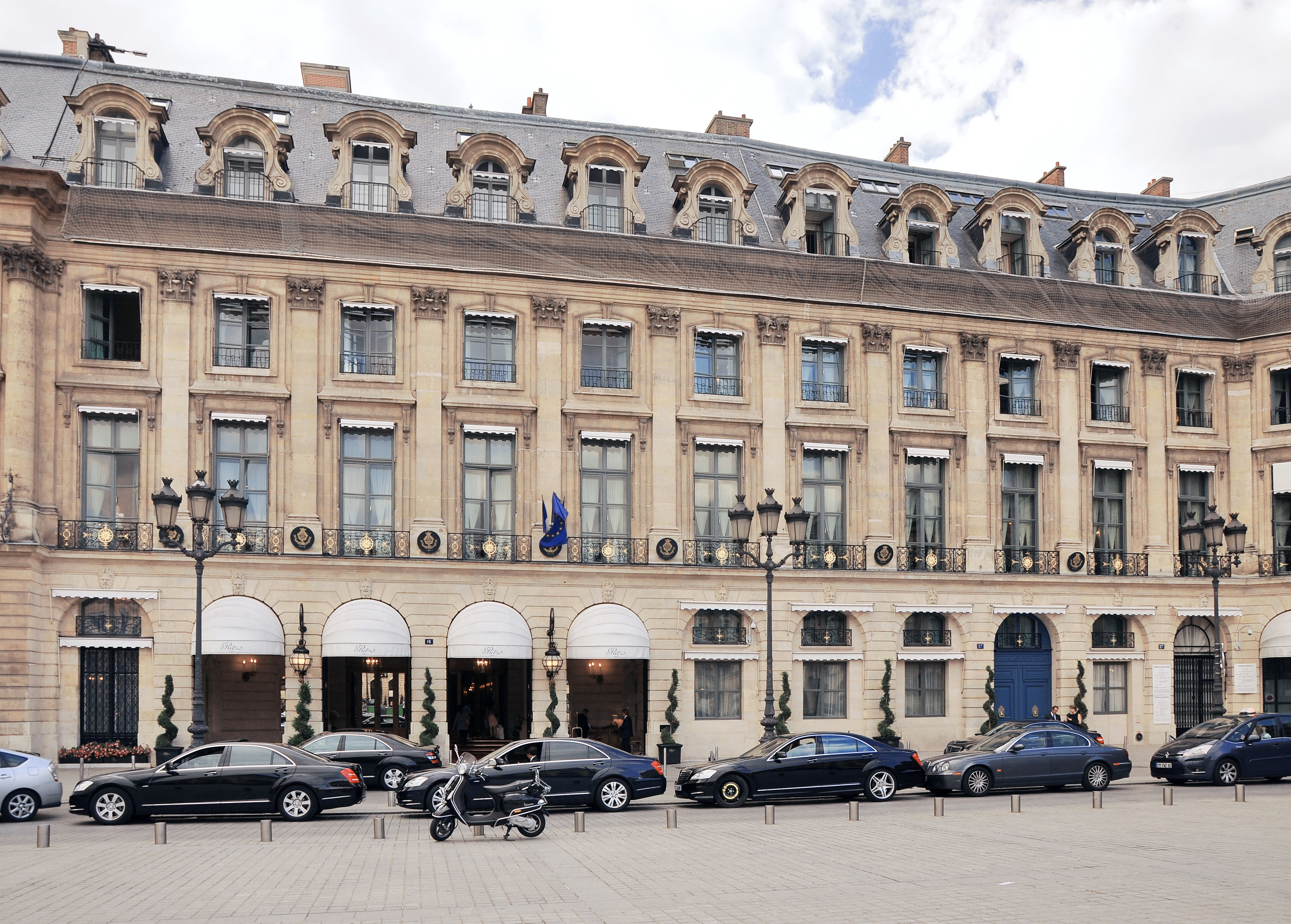
The Ritz Paris in 2011.

In 2015, Estelle Touzet became head sommelier at the Ritz Paris for its reopening after four years of renovation. With a team of seven to nine people (including one woman), she completely rethought the wine list and reviewed the 1,100 references in the palace's cellar, which included between 40,000 and 55,000 bottles of grands crus and rare vintages. She was also involved in the development of a computer system to manage the cellar and wine invoicing more efficiently. Her day-to-day work then included buying bottles, designing the wine list, training teams and providing service in the restaurants and lounges. At the Ritz, she promoted a non-conformist vision of wine, highlighting unexpected pairings such as champagne with red mullet, or gamay with ravioli carbonara with peanut and bacon cream. Her aim was to free herself from the technical details of the wines she tasted, to focus above all on their sensory characteristics. Contrary to her usual practice, she systematically chose the wine she wanted to serve first, before working with the head chef to decide which dish would go best with it. She favored lesser-known Loire Valley appellations, rather than the Burgundy and Bordeaux wines for which Parisian palace cellars were renowned. In September 2018, she inaugurated " eudis du vin" (Wine Thursdays) at the Ritz Bar, fun wine-tasting workshops. Estelle Touzet described her role as head sommelier at the Ritz as that of a "merchant of happiness", stating that "whatever bottle we choose, our customers should leave with an unforgettable memory".

At the same time, she gave lectures at several hotel schools in France. In 2019, Estelle Touzet was part of the jury for the final of the 34th Best Apprentices of France competition, in the "Arts de la table" (Tableware) specialization.

In September 2020, as the hotel and restaurant industry faced the health and economic crisis caused by COVID-19, Estelle Touzet left her position at the Ritz Paris; her decision was motivated by "a change in personal life" and the setting of new professional goals, in particular her wish to create a new consulting company, specializing in wine-related projects. She was a guest on Tout le monde joue en cuisine, a program hosted by Nagui on France 2 on 22 September 2020.

=== Publications ===
- With Vocanson, Claire; Rambaud, Eugénie (19 August 2015). Une sommelière dans votre cuisine [A sommelier in your kitchen] (in French). Vanves: éditions du Chêne-EPA. ISBN 978-2-85120-849-1.

According to culinary blogger Anne Lataillade, it's a "book that's very educational (but not heavy-handed), very interesting about wine and pulls readers up by their bootstraps. The recipes are accessible [...]. Even if they are the consequence of choosing a wine, they are no less gourmet". Food critic Gilles Pudlowski points out that Estelle Touzet "delivers her wine and food pairings, her favorite vintages and her beautiful ideas in a beautifully illustrated book. It's wise, playful, fervent and colorful. [...] It's an opportunity to tell the story of a wine, to develop a pairing, to unfold a menu. This book of drawers is like a series of surprises, an opportunity to develop one's knowledge of taste, and therefore of oneself". Journalist Charlotte Langrand adds that Estelle Touzet here takes "habits in reverse by adapting recipes to wine" in a "wonderful book".

- "Vins de Sancerre" [Sancerre wines]. Le Berry Républicain (in French). 24 May 2019. ISSN 0988-8357.

In this special issue commissioned by the newspaper's editorial team, Estelle Touzet gives suggestions for pairing dishes with red, rosé or white sancerre.

The sommelier is also regularly interviewed for food and wine pairing tips in national media such as L'Express, France 2, Le Point, RTL, France Inter, Le Parisien Magazine and Madame Figaro.

=== Awards ===
Estelle Touzet is appointed to two national orders:

- Knight of Ordre des Arts et des Lettres (order of 15 December 2011).
- Knight of the Order of Agricultural Merit (order of 31 January 2019).
- 2011: Sommelier de l'année (Sommelier of the year) by Guide Pudlowski;
- 2012: Sommelier de l'année (Sommelier of the year) by the magazine Le Chef;
- 2012: Prix du sommelier de l'Académie internationale de la gastronomie (International Academy of Gastronomy Sommelier Award);
- 2017: Listed among the fourteen Women's Forum's "Rising Talents";
- 2019: Prix de l'œnologie aux Trophées Femmes du Tourisme (Oenology award at the Women in Tourism Trophies).

=== Private life ===
At the age of seven, Estelle Touzet learned to play the violin with her sister at the Conservatoire de Châteauroux. In her spare time, she played in two groups, the Orchestre symphonique et lyrique de Paris and Les Ondes Plurielles. In 2017, she confided that this activity complemented her profession as sommelier, when she directed, "like an orchestra conductor", the cellar of the Ritz Paris:

In the lexical field of wine, there are many words that come from the world of music: nuance, intensity, resonance... Crescendo, for example - we start with the mineral, crystalline wine and move towards a more unctuous, powerful, creamy wine. Finally, we speak of food and wine pairings, like musical chords. I love this crossing of lexical fields; it's natural and spontaneous.

— Estelle Touzet, 15 June 2017

== Positions ==
=== Women in sommellerie ===
Women have long been present in sommellerie, notably in Finland and South Korea, but remain poorly represented. In France, only Virginie Routis before her seems to have held sommelier responsibilities, when she joined the Élysée Palace in 2007. As one of the only female head sommeliers in France, Estelle Touzet has set the benchmark for this precise function, in an environment where it is generally men who supervise the sommelier service.

Being a woman in a man's world, I've lived it. It took me a long time to understand that this distinction existed. The customer who refuses to let me take the order because I'm a woman, or those who take us for the trainee: even if, in the end, it's skills that count, you have to prove that you can hold your ground physically - you have to carry crates of wine - and psychologically: we're talking about a brigade for a reason.

— Estelle Touzet, Challenges, 6 October 2017.

In 2018, she explained that she was still subjected to misogynistic comments, when a new customer told her that "he wasn't interested in a woman's opinion".

=== Vision of management ===
Estelle Touzet has admitted that she wants to stay "far away from clichés" when it comes to different management styles for men and women. She does, however, speak of an "exacerbated sensitivity that needs to be contained" by remaining "attentive" to her team. In her words, her leadership style is "energetic, enthusiastic, lively and elegant". She doesn't seek to impose herself, but to identify and stand out: "You can do it with strength, grace or elegance, or with wit and knowledge. For a woman, you have to combine all of these and be an iron fist in a velvet glove on a daily basis". During service, the sommelier pays particular attention to the power of words and "the art of knowing how to say it", when talking to customers or communicating with her staff.

=== Access to wine for the general public ===
In 2011, Estelle Touzet said of wine fairs that "there has to be wine for everyone. Going to a winery to buy wine is a very specific process that only concerns between 5 and 10% of the population. The act of buying a bottle of wine by walking into a store and asking the sales assistant for advice, trusting him or her, is not an easy one. That's why the wine fair remains indispensable.

In a 2015 interview with Élise Lucet on France 2's 1 p.m. news program, Estelle Touzet described wine fairs as an interesting opportunity to "share, desacralize the world of wine, which can seem rather closed and austere, [...] access great wines and grands crus classés at fairly affordable prices, [...] provided that these bottles are tasted properly and showcased as they should be".

In 2021, Estelle Touzet added that "the important thing [with wines] is not to know or not to know, but to taste what you like, to identify your needs and sensitivities with your own vocabulary".

== Bibliography ==
- Fondanaux, Marie-Claude; Didier, Béatrice; Fouque, Antoinette; Calle-Gruber, Mireille (2013). "Touzet, Estelle [Berry 1981]". Dictionnaire universel des créatrices [Universal dictionary of women creators] (in French). Paris: Éditions des femmes. ISBN 978-2-721-00631-8. OCLC 940626792.
