= Belle du Berry =

French singer (1966–2020)

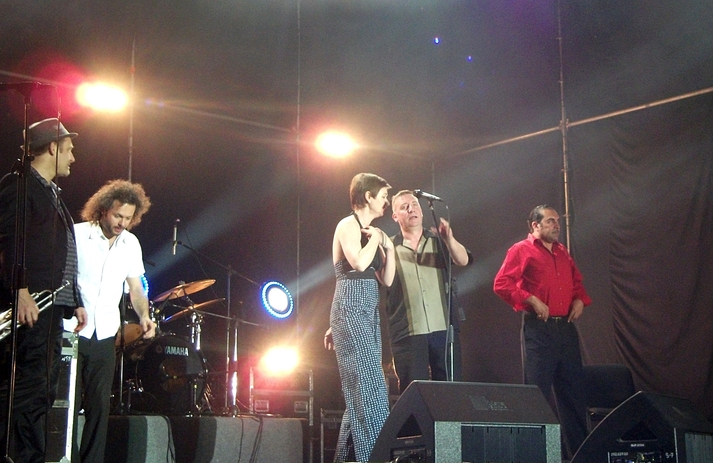
- Belle du Berry (middle) with Paris Combo in 2012
- Born: Bénédicte Grimault; 8 April 1966; Berry-Bouy, near Bourges, France
- Died: 11 August 2020 (aged 54); Le Kremlin-Bicêtre, France
- Occupation: Singer

Bénédicte Grimault (8 April 1966 – 11 August 2020), who performed as Belle du Berry, was a French singer, songwriter, and actress. She was the lead singer of the band Paris Combo.

== Biography ==
She was born in Berry-Bouy, near Bourges, in France. After studying cinematography in Paris and becoming attracted to the punk movement, she joined the band Pervers Polymorphes Inorganisés (PPI) and took the stage name Belle du Berry. At the end of the 1980s, the group sang alongside Les Endimanchés at Berry Zèbre, a cinema in Belleville. In 1992, as part of the musical revue Les Champêtres de Joie, she collaborated with Philippe Decouflé to choreograph the ballets for the closing of the 1992 Winter Olympics.

Du Berry took part in the Cabaret Sauvage from 1994 to 1995 and began her partnership with Australian musician David Lewis, performing with him at the Erotica and the Opus café, as well as numerous other venues across Paris. From these performances emerged Paris Combo, which would become highly successful. Their second album, Living-Room, went gold, and toured for ten years. Lewis and du Berry worked alongside Roger Planchon and Laurent Pelly in various musical, theatrical, and cinematic performances. Du Berry also wrote for Lokua Kanza and La Trabant.

In 2009, du Berry wrote a collection of new songs with Lewis as the trumpeter and pianist. The pair would eventually step back from touring and play their unreleased songs to a minimalistic level. Denis Hénault-Parizel would become their bass guitarist and Rémy Kaprielan would become their drummer.

Belle du Berry died of cancer in Le Kremlin-Bicêtre on 11 August 2020.

== Discography ==
- Quizz (2009)

== Filmography ==
- Lautrec (1998)
- Raoul et Jocelyne (2000)

== Television ==
- Vivement dimanche (2002)
