= Limeux =

Limeux may refer to the following places in France:

- Limeux, Cher, a commune in the department of Cher
- Limeux, Somme, a commune in the department of Somme
