= Paris Combo =

French musical group

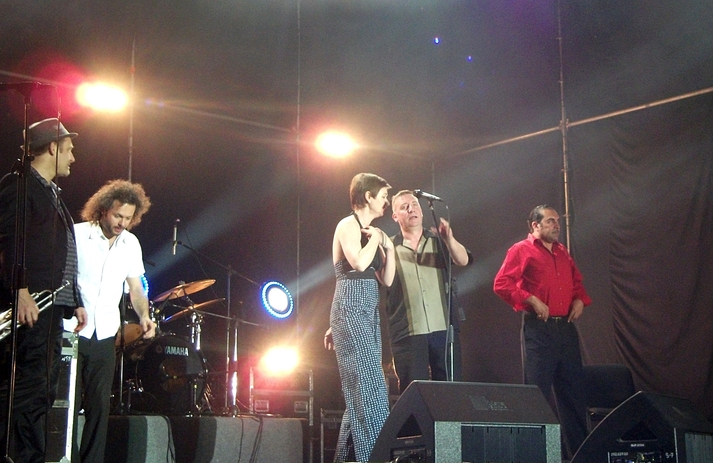
- Paris Combo in 2012

Background information
- Origin: Paris, France
- Genres: Pop, World music, chanson, jazz, cabaret
- Years active: 1995–2005; 2010–present
- Members: David Lewis; Potzi; François Jeannin; Benoit Dunoyer de Segonzac
- Past members: Belle du Berry; Mano Razanajato; Emmanuel Chabbey
- Website: www.pariscombo.com

Paris Combo is a musical group based in Paris, France, fronted until her death in 2020 by singer Belle du Berry. The group has an eclectic style, blending elements from the traditional French chanson and pop, American jazz and swing, Roma music, and North African music. They have performed live all over the world.

The mainstream success of their second album Living Room (2000) gave the group a unique status as a French indie band capable of drawing crowds not only in France, where the album went gold, but also in Australia and the USA where they have toured over twenty times.

== Background ==
Bénédicte Grimault (born 1966, Berry-Bouy, near Bourges) studied cinema in Paris and became attracted to the punk movement. Taking the stage name Belle du Berry, she joined the group Les Pervers Polymorphes Inorganisés (PPI), and in 1989 joined Les Champêtres de Joie and began playing the accordion. Les Champêtres de Joie was a musical revue that presented early 20th century chansons, including those by Damia, Fréhel, Marianne Oswald and Arletty, in a punk-influenced style. Among the group members were drummer François Jeannin and guitarist Potzi. Belle du Berry and Champêtres de Joie collaborated with choreographer Philippe Decouflé to create the closing ceremony of the Winter Olympics at Albertville in 1992. She contributed to several theatre and film projects in the early 1990s, including a revue about the Dadaist movement, a tribute to Boris Vian, and acted the role of singer Yvette Guilbert in the Toulouse-Lautrec biographical film Lautrec.

== Biography ==
In 1994, Belle du Berry began collaborating with Australian musician David Lewis in the musical revue Cabaret Sauvage. Lewis had moved to France in his early twenties, and studied at the Paris Conservatoire. He made a name for himself on the French music scene playing with Arthur H and Manu Dibango. The pair formed the group Paris Combo in 1995, with François Jeannin, Potzi, and bass player Manohisa Razanajato. They began to hone their sound playing in cafés and barges along the Seine under the name "Paris Combo". Du Berry, whose musical roots go back to post-punk bands, cited influences such as Arletty, the Surrealists, and a panoply of more recent artists including the B-52's. Potzi's Django-influenced guitar often mixes with François’ ska or Latin grooves to create a fascinating blend. Lewis attributes the group's approach to Paris’ cosmopolitan atmosphere.

Paris Combo's eponymous 1997 debut disc arrived as the swing revival was in full bloom, yet the band's wide-ranging mix of musical influences instantly set them apart from other groups in the genre, winning critical praise and appealing to international audiences. The momentum continued with the release of their second album, Living Room, which went gold in France in 2000, and confirmed the group's international standing, with tours of the United States, Australia and Asia and a nomination at the French industry awards, Les Victoires de la Musique. The following year Paris Combo released their third set, Attraction, with a series of concerts at the prestigious Cité de la Musique in Paris.

In early 2003, Paris Combo's "Terrien d'Eau Douce" won in The 2nd Annual Independent Music Awards for Best World Song. Their fourth album, Motifs, in 2004, was supported by a tour that included Australasia, Brazil and the iconic Hollywood Bowl in Los Angeles where the group was accompanied by the Hollywood Bowl Orchestra. The band then took a break for several years. During that time, Belle du Berry and David Lewis continued to work together, producing the album Quizz (2009) and performing together on stage.

Paris Combo started working together again in 2010, with new bassist Emmanuel Chabbey. They toured widely in Europe, the Middle East and in the US, and released their fifth album, 5, in 2013 on the DRG/eOne label. Media response to 5 was enthusiastic and in 2013–14, they sold out venues across the country with their first US tours in a decade and a triumphant return to Australia in 2015. Paris Combo's latest album, Tako Tsubo, was released worldwide in 2017, and again accompanied extensive touring in the US, Australia and NZ and Europe.

== Members ==
- Belle du Berry, French, lead singer and accordion player (died August 2020)
- David Lewis, from Australia, trumpet and piano.
- Potzi, self-described Gypsy of Algerian descent, guitarist and banjo player
- François-François (a.k.a. François Jeannin), French, percussionist and singer
- Mano Razanajato, from Madagascar, bass player and singer (until 2011)
- Emmanuel Chabbey, bass player (2011–2017)
- Benoit Dunoyer de Segonzac (since 2017)

== Discography ==
- 1998 – Paris Combo (Tinder Records)
- 2001 – Living Room (Tinder Records)
- 2002 – Attraction (Ark 21)
- 2005 – Motifs (DRG Records Incorporated)
- 2005 – Live (DRG Records Incorporated)
- 2013 – 5 (DRG Records Incorporated)
- 2017 – Tako Tsubo (DRG Records Incorporated)
- 2022 – Quesaco (Six Degrees Records)
