= David Lewis (Australian musician) =

- Born: c. 1960 (age 65–66)
- Origin: Hamilton, Victoria, Australia
- Genres: jazz, pop
- Occupations: Musician, composer
- Instruments: Piano, trumpet, keyboards
- Years active: 1985–present

David Alan Lewis (born c. 1960) is an Australian-born jazz and pop trumpeter, pianist and composer from Hamilton, Victoria. He relocated to France in 1982 where he has joined various groups and toured Europe, Africa and Australia. He has performed and composed musical theatre and cabaret. Lewis has collaborated with singer and accordionist Belle du Berry since 1994 and both joined music group, Paris Combo, which released five albums from 1998 to 2005. Since 2007, Du Berry and Lewis have toured as a duo and released their debut album, Quizz in 2009.

== Biography ==
David Alan Lewis grew up in the rural town of Hamilton, Victoria, he began studying piano and performing on trumpet in school bands. His mother, Elaine Lewis, was a music teacher, she later became an author and a book shop owner. Lewis continued his musical studies at the University of Melbourne, he then travelled to Sweden and Paris, to study trumpet in the early 1980s. While studying at the Paris Conservatoire he also premiered new works for trumpet with the collective N.A.M.E. (New American Music in Paris). After graduation, his attraction to jazz and popular music finally got the upper-hand. He co-founded the group Crescent and he began to perform at jazz venues such as the New Morning, and in a wide range of other professional situations, including a short stint at the Folies Bergère.

In 1991 he joined Manu Dibango's group and toured extensively through Europe and Africa, including a historic tour of South Africa in 1993. He has also recorded and toured with many Paris-based artists including Italian singer Gianmaria Testa, Lokua Kanza, John Greaves, Maurane, Marc Perrone and Arthur H and the Bachibouzouk Band.

By 1994, Lewis began to write and perform music for theatre and cabaret in Paris – while performing at the Cabaret Sauvage at la Villette in Paris he first worked with chanteuse Belle du Berry. They began a performing and song writing collaboration which continued with the group Paris Combo. Du Berry and Lewis became domestic partners. Paris Combo enjoyed international success – their second album "Living-Room" (1999) was a gold-record in France and was nominated for the French equivalent of the Grammy. The group toured extensively outside France, including three Australian tours and twelve in the US. As well as performing with the group, Lewis co-produced their four studio albums. After 2005, Paris Combo has been in hiatus.

Since 2007, Lewis and du Berry worked as a duo and released their debut album, Quizz in September 2009. They have toured Europe and Australia, and performed at the Hollywood Bowl in United States.
