= Arrondissement of Vierzon =

Coordinates: 47°13′N 2°03′E

Vierzon
- Arrondissement
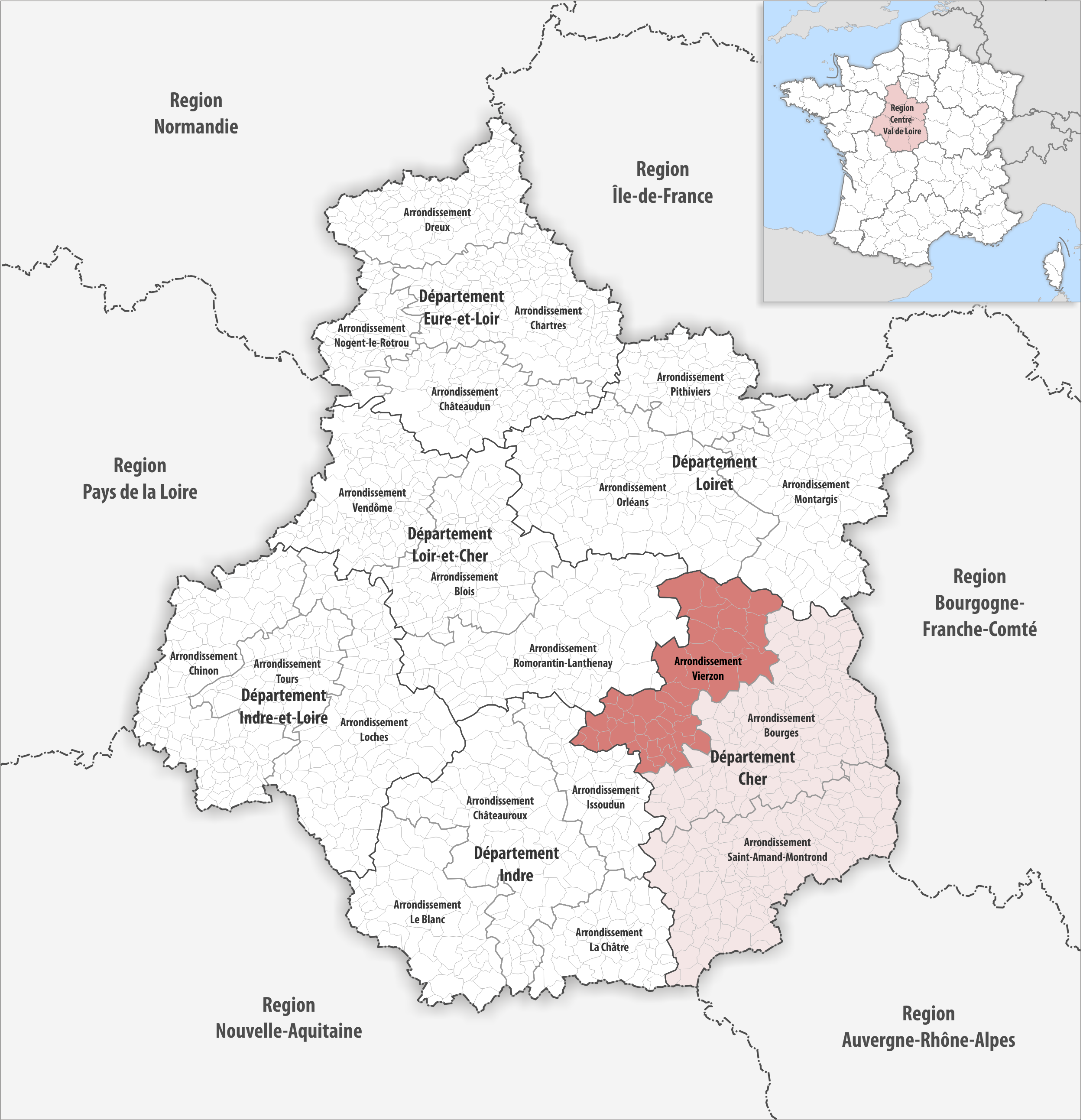
- Location within the region Centre-Val de Loire
- Country: France
- Region: Centre-Val de Loire
- Department: Cher
- No. of communes: {{{nbcomm}}}
- Area: 1,767.4 km^{2} (682.4 sq mi)
- Population (2023): 67,309
  - Density: 38.084/km^{2} (98.636/sq mi)
- INSEE code: 183

The arrondissement of Vierzon is an arrondissement of France in the Cher department in the Centre-Val de Loire region. It has 43 communes. Its population is 68,137 (2021), and its area is 1,767.4 km^{2} (682.4 sq mi).

== Composition ==
The communes of the arrondissement of Vierzon, and their INSEE codes, are:

1. Allouis (18005)
2. Argent-sur-Sauldre (18011)
3. Aubigny-sur-Nère (18015)
4. Berry-Bouy (18028)
5. Blancafort (18030)
6. Brinay (18036)
7. Brinon-sur-Sauldre (18037)
8. Cerbois (18044)
9. La Chapelle-d'Angillon (18047)
10. Chéry (18064)
11. Clémont (18067)
12. Dampierre-en-Graçay (18085)
13. Ennordres (18088)
14. Foëcy (18096)
15. Genouilly (18100)
16. Graçay (18103)
17. Ivoy-le-Pré (18115)
18. Lazenay (18124)
19. Limeux (18128)
20. Lury-sur-Arnon (18134)
21. Massay (18140)
22. Mehun-sur-Yèvre (18141)
23. Ménétréol-sur-Sauldre (18147)
24. Méreau (18148)
25. Méry-ès-Bois (18149)
26. Méry-sur-Cher (18150)
27. Nançay (18159)
28. Neuvy-sur-Barangeon (18165)
29. Nohant-en-Graçay (18167)
30. Oizon (18170)
31. Presly (18185)
32. Preuilly (18186)
33. Quincy (18190)
34. Sainte-Montaine (18227)
35. Sainte-Thorette (18237)
36. Saint-Georges-sur-la-Prée (18210)
37. Saint-Hilaire-de-Court (18214)
38. Saint-Laurent (18219)
39. Saint-Outrille (18228)
40. Thénioux (18263)
41. Vierzon (18279)
42. Vignoux-sur-Barangeon (18281)
43. Vouzeron (18290)

== History ==
The arrondissement of Vierzon was created in 1984.

As a result of the reorganisation of the cantons of France which came into effect in 2015, the borders of the cantons are no longer related to the borders of the arrondissements. The cantons of the arrondissement of Vierzon were, as of January 2015:

1. Argent-sur-Sauldre
2. Aubigny-sur-Nère
3. La Chapelle-d'Angillon
4. Graçay
5. Lury-sur-Arnon
6. Mehun-sur-Yèvre
7. Vierzon-1
8. Vierzon-2
