= Théols =

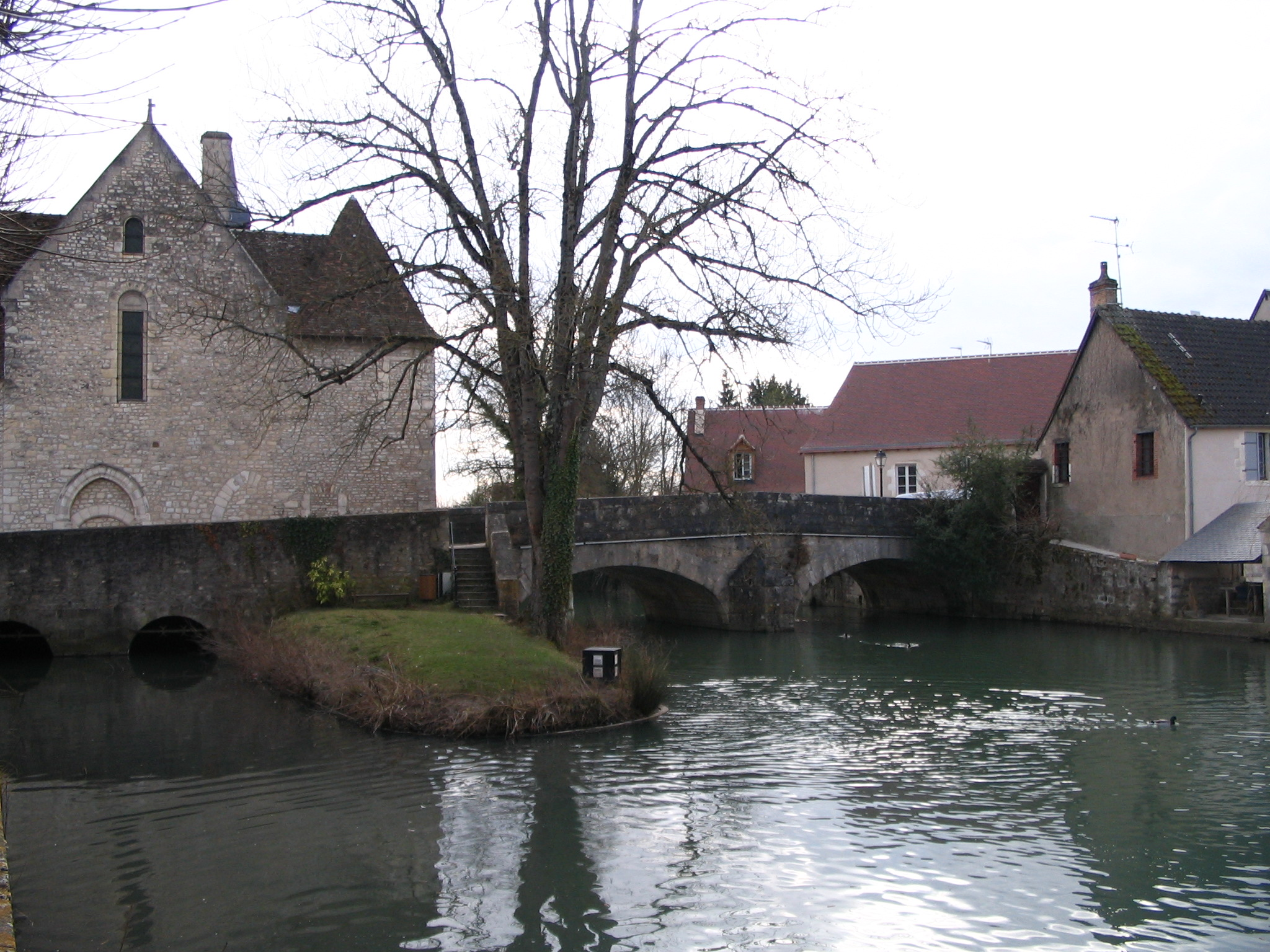
- River near Issoudun

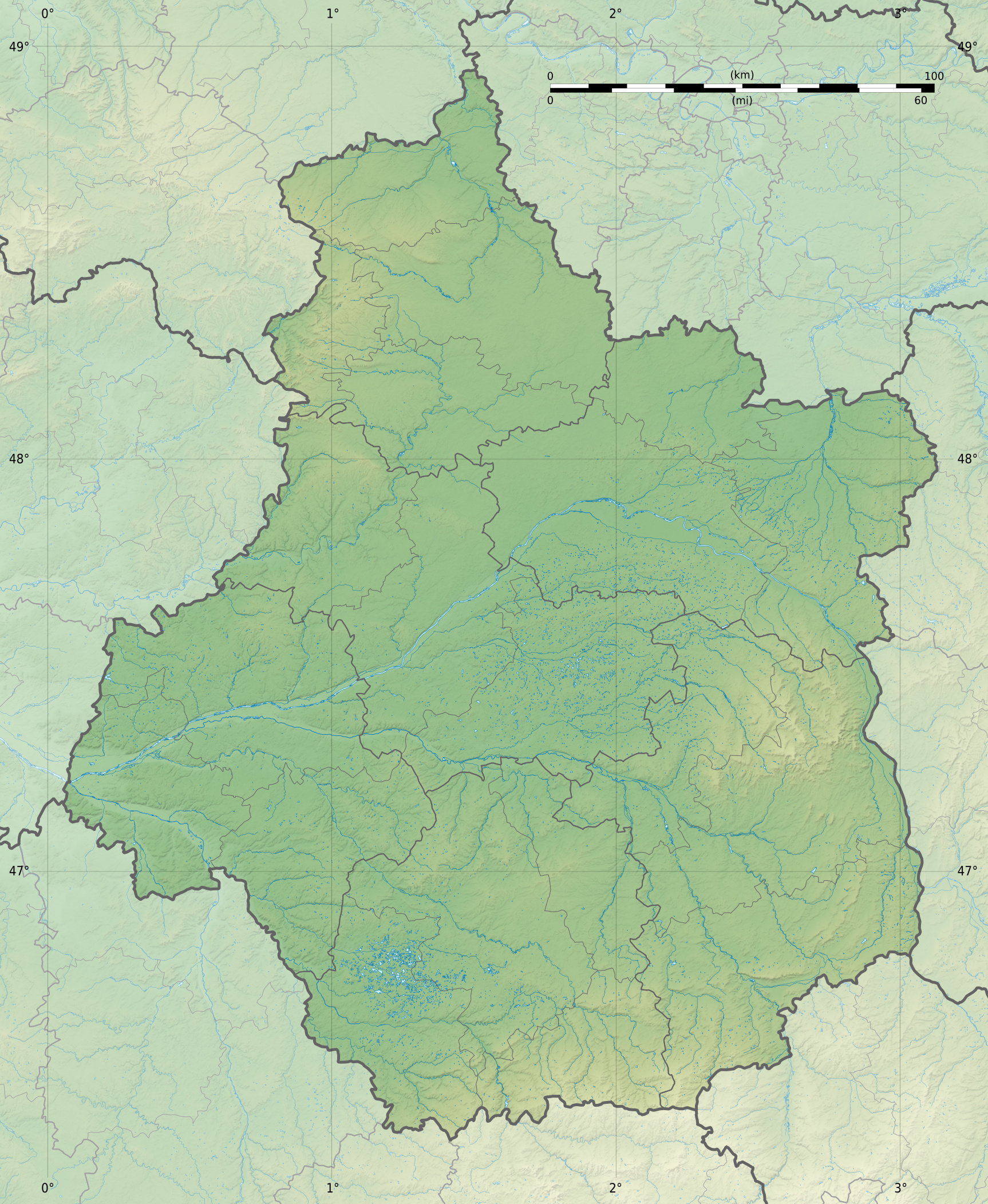
- Location within France Location within Centre-Val de Loire

Location
- Country: France

Physical characteristics
- Source
  - location: Les Sapins, Bommiers
  - coordinates: 46.7946°N 1.9719°E
  - elevation: 150 m (490 ft)
- Mouth
  - location: Arnon, Lazenay
  - coordinates: 47.07°N 2.0534°E
  - elevation: 112 m (367 ft)
- Length: 42.3 km (26.3 mi)
- Basin size: 797 km^{2} (308 sq mi)
- Discharge
  - average: 2.99 m^{3}/s (106 cu ft/s) (Sainte-Lizaigne)

Basin features
- Progression: Arnon→ Cher→ Loire→ Atlantic Ocean
- Tributaries
  - left: Tournemine
  - right: Cousseron, Thonaise
- Sources: , Géoportail and Banque Hydro

The Théols is a 42.3-kilometre-long (26.3 mi) river in central France. Its source is at 150 m (490 ft) near Bommiers, in the Boischaut natural region. It joins the Arnon near Lazenay.

== Hydrology ==
The flow of the river was studied from 1971 to 1975 at Sainte-Lizaigne, located about 10 km (6.2 mi) from its confluence with the Arnon. At this point it drains 797 km^{2} (308 sq mi), over 90% of its watershed. The river has an average flow of 2.99 m^{3}/s (106 cu ft/s) at Sainte-Lizaigne.

There are seasonal fluctuations in the flow of the Théols, but they are not substantial. The highest flow rates are from February to May, with average flows from 3.5 to 5 m^{3}/s (120 to 180 cu ft/s) (peak February–March). From April, the flow rate decreases regularly toward low water, which lasts from August to October. Floods are seldom important. The daily maximum flow recorded at Sainte-Lizaigne was 32.3 m^{3}/s (1,140 cu ft/s) on March 22, 1974.

Its yearly drainage basin precipitation is currently 118 mm (4.6 in), just over a third of the national average of 320 mm (13 in), and also below the average of for the Loire basin (245 mm (9.6 in)) and the Arnon (200 mm (7.9 in)). The discharge was hence 3.75 L/s (0.132 cu ft/s) per km² of basin.

=== Fish ===
The river is rich in bleak, barbel, largemouth bass, cream, pike, crucian, roach, gudgeon, rudd, perch, tench, zander and catfish.
