= Poisieux =

- Commune
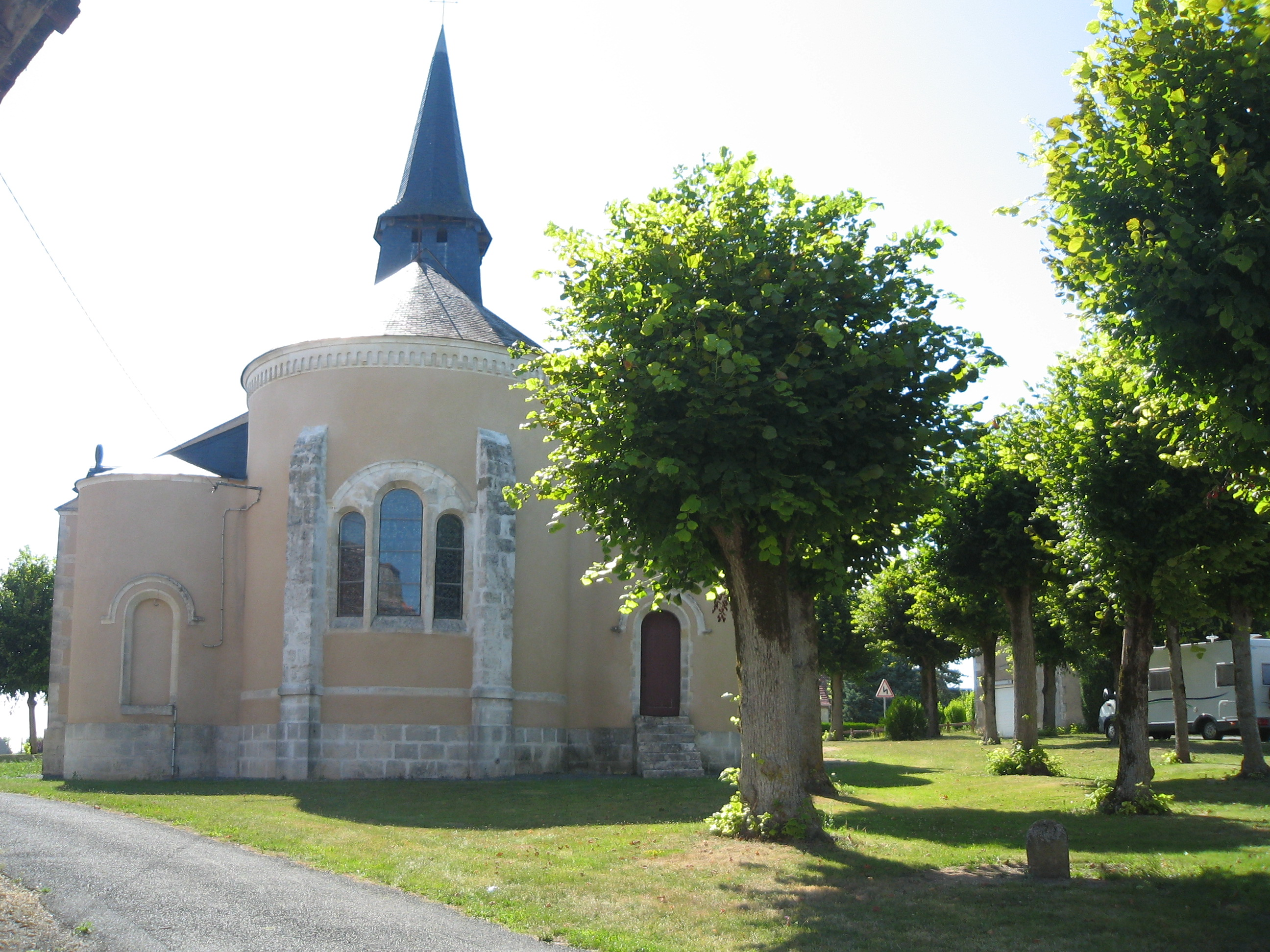
- The church in Poisieux
- Location of Poisieux
- Location within France Location within Centre-Val de Loire
- Coordinates: 47°01′48″N 2°05′56″E
- Country: France
- Region: Centre-Val de Loire
- Department: Cher
- Arrondissement: Bourges
- Canton: Chârost
- Intercommunality: CC Cœur de Berry

Government
  - Mayor (2020–2026): Filipe Maia
- Area^{1}: 10.3 km^{2} (4.0 sq mi)
- Elevation: 145 m (476 ft)
- Highest elevation: 152 m (499 ft)
- Lowest elevation: 113 m (371 ft)
- Population (2023): 216
  - Density: 21.0/km^{2} (54.3/sq mi)
- Time zone: UTC+01:00 (CET)
  - Summer (DST): UTC+02:00 (CEST)
- INSEE/Postal code: 18182 /18290
- ^{1} French Land Register data, which excludes lakes, ponds, glaciers > 1 km^{2} (0.386 sq mi or 247 acres) and river estuaries.

Poisieux (French pronunciation: [pwazjø]) is a commune in the Cher department in the Centre-Val de Loire region of France.

It is a small farming village situated by the banks of the river Arnon. It borders with the department of Indre, some 14 miles (23 km) southwest of Bourges, at the junction of the D190 and the D18 roads.

== Population ==
Historical population
Year	Pop.	±% p.a.
1968	212	—
1975	210	−0.14%
1982	167	−3.22%
1990	155	−0.93%
1999	158	+0.21%
2007	206	+3.37%
2012	213	+0.67%
2017	223	+0.92%
2023	216	−0.53%
Source: INSEE

== Sights ==
- The church, dating from the nineteenth century.
- The chateau of Mazières.

== See also ==
- Communes of the Cher department
