= Communauté de communes Cœur de Berry =

Federation of municipalities in France

Cœur de Berry
- Communauté de communes
- Interactive map of Cœur de Berry
- Coordinates: 47°08′N 02°03′E
- Country: France
- Region: Centre-Val de Loire
- Department: Cher
- No. of communes: {{{nbcomm}}}
- Established: 2017
- Area: 207.8 km^{2} (80.2 sq mi)
- Population (2019): 6,874
  - Density: 33.08/km^{2} (85.68/sq mi)

The Communauté de communes Cœur de Berry is a communauté de communes, an intercommunal structure, in the Cher department, in the Centre-Val de Loire region, central France. It was created in January 2017 by the merger of the former communautés de communes Terres d'Yèvre and Vals de Cher et d'Arnon. Its area is 207.8 km^{2}, and its population was 6,874 in 2019. Its seat is in Lury-sur-Arnon.

== Communes ==
The communauté de communes consists of the following 11 communes:

1. Brinay
2. Cerbois
3. Chéry
4. Lazenay
5. Limeux
6. Lury-sur-Arnon
7. Méreau
8. Poisieux
9. Preuilly
10. Quincy
11. Sainte-Thorette
