= Quincy AOC =

Quincy (French pronunciation: [kɛ̃si]) is an Appellation d'origine contrôlée (AOC) in the Loire Valley wine region of France which produces dry white wine. It grows in two communes: Quincy and Brinay in the department of Cher.

== History ==
=== Antiquity ===
The etymology of Quincy is thought to come from the Roman name, domaine de Quintius. The Bituriges cultivated the land since ancient times.

=== Middle-Ages ===
In 1120, the wine of Quincy was named in a speech by Pope Calixtus II and the Sauvignon blanc introduced by the monks at Cîteaux Abbey.

=== Contemporary Times ===
After the consecutive replanting of the vineyards because of the Phylloxera epidemic, Quincy was the first commune to be awarded an AOC in this part of the Loire region, on 6 August 1936.

== Geographical location ==
=== Localisation ===
The Quincy vineyard is situated in the Champagne bérrichonnein the Cher department, between Bourges and Vierzon. It is planted on a plateau of the right bank of the river Cher. Extending from North to South, the East side of it is exposed, divided between the communes of Quincy and Brinay.

=== Pedology and orography ===
The vineyard was planted on a Kimmeridgian marly plateau, hanging over the Cher River. It is covered by a mixture of alluvium silica-clay soil. This mixture drains away the excess water and the in-depth marl cover preserves water, protecting it from a dry period.

The soil has three layers: a soil made up of sand and gravel on an underlay of clay, a sandy soil covered by red sand and a sandy-silt soil on a clayey-sand or clay with slightly sandy soil.

=== Climate ===
The vineyards benefits from the relatively warm and dry local climate.

== Vineyards ==
=== Grape varieties ===
Quincy white wine is only made using the Sauvignon grape. Sauvignon blanc is the main grape planted, while the closely related Sauvignon gris grape represents 10% of the planted surfaces. The not so fertile soil reduces the exuberance of the Sauvignon vegetation well. Harvesting control also ensures optimum maturity of the grape.

=== Viticulture ===
The Sauvignon grapes are grown in long trellises to help manage its capricious and low fertility. The single Guyot is limited to a number of 10 vine eyes for support while the double Guyot has 12 vine eyes. With cordon training, or cordon de Royat, a maximum of 14 vine eyes are used, split on two heads of a maximum of 2 vine eyes. The plantation density must be more than 5,500 vines per hectare. The distance between rows cannot exceed 1.45 metres and the distance between vines on a row must be between 0.90 and 1.25 metres. Foliage trellising is compulsory and must not exceed 0.6 times the space between the rows. This height is measured between 10 cm under the string and the height of trimming. Irrigation is forbidden, as is weeding of the gaps and embankments.

=== Harvesting ===
It can be carried out by sorting the grapes out manually or by using a machine to pick the grapes from the vine. The harvesting of vines that are less than three years old cannot be used for wines of the AOC. The amount of sugar in the grape must be less than 170 grams per litre and the potential degree of the juice should be less than 12.5% volume. The permitted yield of the appellation is 65 hectolitres per hectare. It can be 75 hl/ha as an exception, but it is the maximum yield.

=== Wine making ===
After it has been picked, the grape is pressed as early as possible. The must is left to undergo a cold stabilisation before fermentation takes place in a tank. After fermentation, ageing of the non-fermented matter sometimes happens in fermentation vats.

=== Marketing ===
In 2006, production was 12,283 hl. Quincy is mainly sold to the French market; however, exports represents 20% of the production.

== Wines ==
The AOC is only used for dry white wine. It can be delicate and fruity (citrusy), with hints of white flowers and pepper. It is a wine which keeps its quality for at least 4 or 5 years, although ageing does not improve the initial quality. This wine is best accompanied with seafood and fish from the Loire or after a meal with goat's cheese from the region such as Valençay, Pouligny-Saint-Pierre or Crottin de Chavignol.
