= Canton of Mehun-sur-Yèvre =

Coordinates: 47°9′N 2°13′E

Mehun-sur-Yèvre
- Canton
- Interactive map of Mehun-sur-Yèvre
- Country: France
- Region: Centre-Val de Loire
- Department: Cher
- No. of communes: {{{nbcomm}}}
- Area: 352.60 km^{2} (136.14 sq mi)
- Population (2023): 18,581
  - Density: 52.697/km^{2} (136.48/sq mi)
- INSEE code: 18 11

The Canton of Mehun-sur-Yèvre is a canton situated in the Cher département and in the Centre-Val de Loire region of France.

== Geography ==
A farming area in the valley of the river Yèvre, in the southeastern part of the arrondissement of Vierzon, centred on the town of Mehun-sur-Yèvre. The altitude varies from 97m at Foëcy to 162m at Berry-Bouy, with an average altitude of 125m.

== Composition ==
At the French canton reorganisation which came into effect in March 2015, the canton was expanded from 5 to 15 communes:

- Allouis
- Berry-Bouy
- Brinay
- Cerbois
- Chéry
- Foëcy
- Lazenay
- Limeux
- Lury-sur-Arnon
- Massay
- Mehun-sur-Yèvre
- Méreau
- Preuilly
- Quincy
- Sainte-Thorette

== Population ==
Historical population
Year	Pop.	±% p.a.
2013	19,253	—
2018	18,995	−0.27%
Source: INSEE

== See also ==
- Arrondissements of the Cher department
- Cantons of the Cher department
- Communes of the Cher department
