= Sainte-Thorette =

- Commune
- Location of Sainte-Thorette
- Location within France Location within Centre-Val de Loire
- Coordinates: 47°04′56″N 2°11′59″E
- Country: France
- Region: Centre-Val de Loire
- Department: Cher
- Arrondissement: Vierzon
- Canton: Mehun-sur-Yèvre
- Intercommunality: CC Cœur de Berry

Government
  - Mayor (2024–2026): Laurent Guillaud
- Area^{1}: 26.54 km^{2} (10.25 sq mi)
- Elevation: 115 m (377 ft)
- Highest elevation: 146 m (479 ft)
- Lowest elevation: 107 m (351 ft)
- Population (2023): 473
  - Density: 17.8/km^{2} (46.2/sq mi)
- Time zone: UTC+01:00 (CET)
  - Summer (DST): UTC+02:00 (CEST)
- INSEE/Postal code: 18237 /18500
- ^{1} French Land Register data, which excludes lakes, ponds, glaciers > 1 km^{2} (0.386 sq mi or 247 acres) and river estuaries.

Sainte-Thorette (French pronunciation: [sɛ̃t tɔʁɛt]) is a commune in the Cher department in the Centre-Val de Loire region of France.

== Geography ==
A valley area of lakes, woods and farming comprising the village and several hamlets, situated by the river Cher, some 10 miles (16 km) west of Bourges at the junction of the D35, D27 and the D23 roads.

== Population ==
Historical population
Year	Pop.	±% p.a.
1968	284	—
1975	276	−0.41%
1982	366	+4.11%
1990	426	+1.92%
1999	425	−0.03%
2007	480	+1.53%
2012	470	−0.42%
2017	480	+0.42%
2023	473	−0.24%
Source: INSEE

== Sights ==
- The church, dating from the fourteenth century.

== See also ==
- Communes of the Cher department
