= Quincy, Cher =

Quincy
- Commune
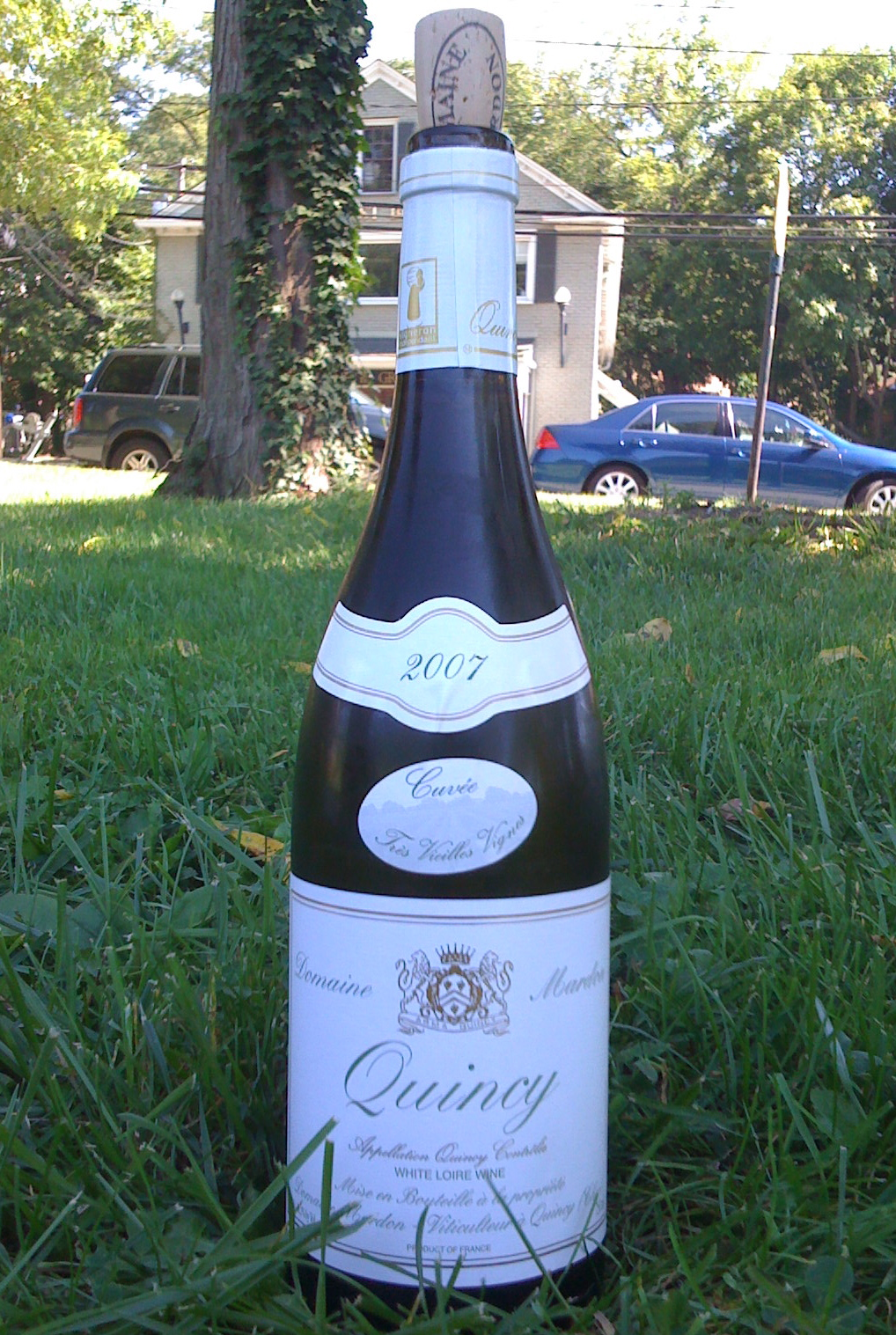
- A 2007 bottle of Quincy AOC white wine

- Coat of arms
- Location of Quincy
- Location within France Location within Centre-Val de Loire
- Coordinates: 47°08′03″N 2°09′28″E
- Country: France
- Region: Centre-Val de Loire
- Department: Cher
- Arrondissement: Vierzon
- Canton: Mehun-sur-Yèvre
- Intercommunality: CC Cœur de Berry

Government
  - Mayor (2020–2026): Pascal Rapin
- Area^{1}: 18.19 km^{2} (7.02 sq mi)
- Elevation: 130 m (430 ft)
- Highest elevation: 136 m (446 ft)
- Lowest elevation: 103 m (338 ft)
- Population (2023): 818
  - Density: 45.0/km^{2} (116/sq mi)
- Time zone: UTC+01:00 (CET)
  - Summer (DST): UTC+02:00 (CEST)
- INSEE/Postal code: 18190 /18120
- ^{1} French Land Register data, which excludes lakes, ponds, glaciers > 1 km^{2} (0.386 sq mi or 247 acres) and river estuaries.

Quincy (French pronunciation: [kɛ̃si]) is a commune in the Cher department in the Centre-Val de Loire Regions of France.

== Geography ==
Quincy is a village located at 10 km of Vierzon and Bourges. Mehun-sur-Yèvre (5000 inhabitants) is a medium-sized town located near Quincy. It is famous for its castle, built by King Charles VII. The river Cher flows through Quincy.

A valley area of lakes, woods and farming comprising the village and a couple of hamlets, situated by the river Cher, some 9 miles (14 km) southeast of Vierzon at the junction of the D27 and the D20 roads.

== Population ==
Historical population
Year	Pop.	±% p.a.
1968	727	—
1975	783	+1.07%
1982	759	−0.44%
1990	812	+0.85%
1999	775	−0.52%
2007	825	+0.78%
2012	924	+2.29%
2017	868	−1.24%
2023	818	−0.98%
Source: INSEE

== See also ==
- Communes of the Cher department
