= Méreau =

- Commune
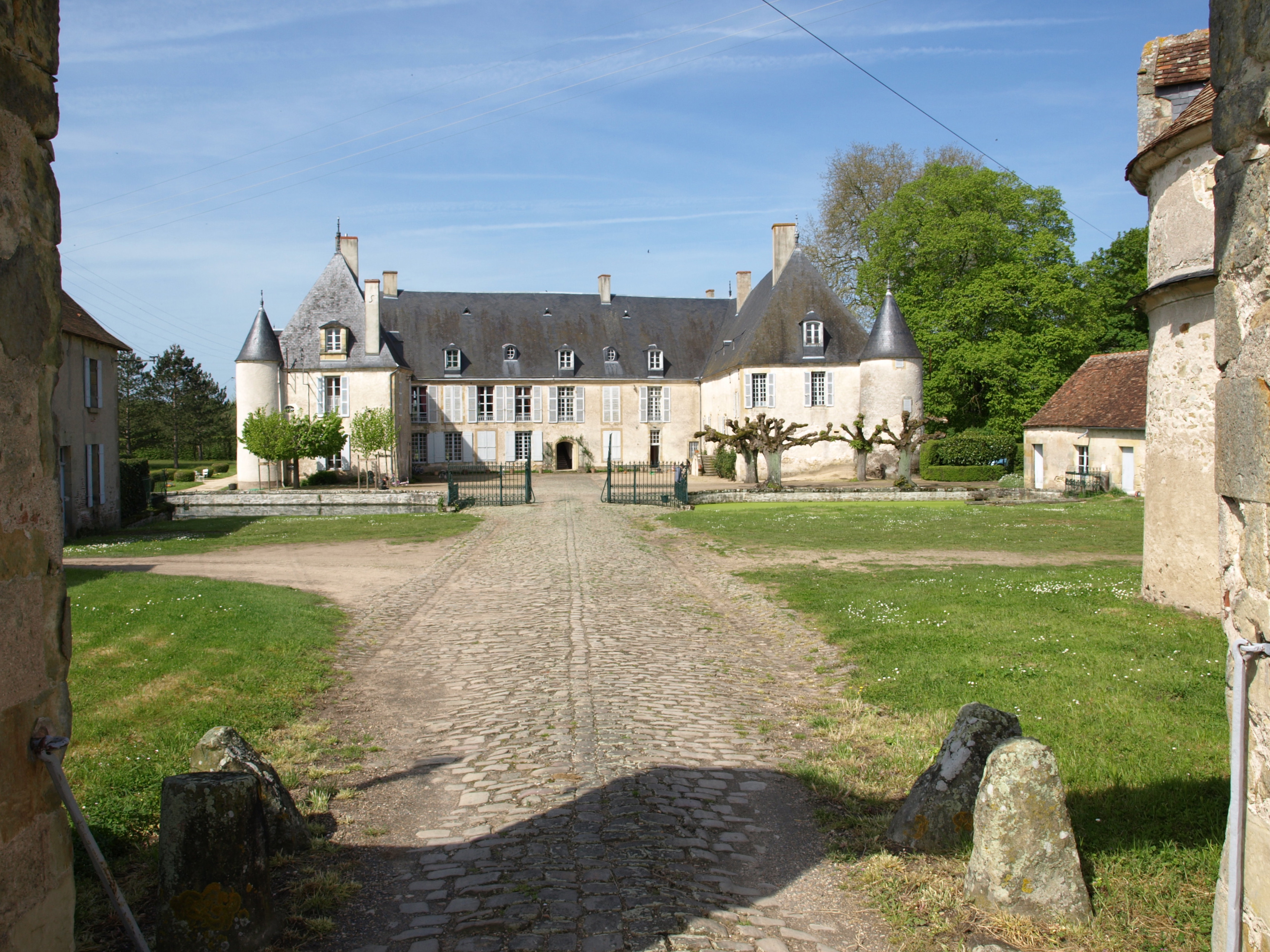
- The Chateau of Autry

- Coat of arms
- Location of Méreau
- Location within France Location within Centre-Val de Loire
- Coordinates: 47°09′50″N 2°03′06″E
- Country: France
- Region: Centre-Val de Loire
- Department: Cher
- Arrondissement: Vierzon
- Canton: Mehun-sur-Yèvre
- Intercommunality: CC Cœur de Berry

Government
  - Mayor (2020–2026): Alain Mornay
- Area^{1}: 18.65 km^{2} (7.20 sq mi)
- Elevation: 114 m (374 ft)
- Highest elevation: 136 m (446 ft)
- Lowest elevation: 95 m (312 ft)
- Population (2023): 2,632
  - Density: 141.1/km^{2} (365.5/sq mi)
- Time zone: UTC+01:00 (CET)
  - Summer (DST): UTC+02:00 (CEST)
- INSEE/Postal code: 18148 /18120
- ^{1} French Land Register data, which excludes lakes, ponds, glaciers > 1 km^{2} (0.386 sq mi or 247 acres) and river estuaries.

Méreau (French pronunciation: [meʁo]) is a commune in the Cher department in the Centre-Val de Loire region of France.

== Geography ==
An area of farming and forestry, comprising the main village and five other villages and hamlets, situated by the banks of the river Arnon immediately south of Vierzon, at the junction of the D320, D18e and the D918 roads. Junction 7 of the A20 is within the commune’s borders.

== Population ==
Historical population
Year	Pop.	±% p.a.
1968	979	—
1975	1,352	+4.72%
1982	1,756	+3.81%
1990	2,020	+1.77%
1999	2,074	+0.29%
2007	2,216	+0.83%
2012	2,491	+2.37%
2017	2,610	+0.94%
2023	2,632	+0.14%
Source: INSEE

== Sights ==
- The church of St. Martin, dating from the nineteenth century.
- The fifteenth-century chateau of Chevilly, with a dovecote and seventeenth century mill.
- The sixteenth-century chateau of Autry.

== See also ==
- Communes of the Cher department
