= Massay =

- Commune
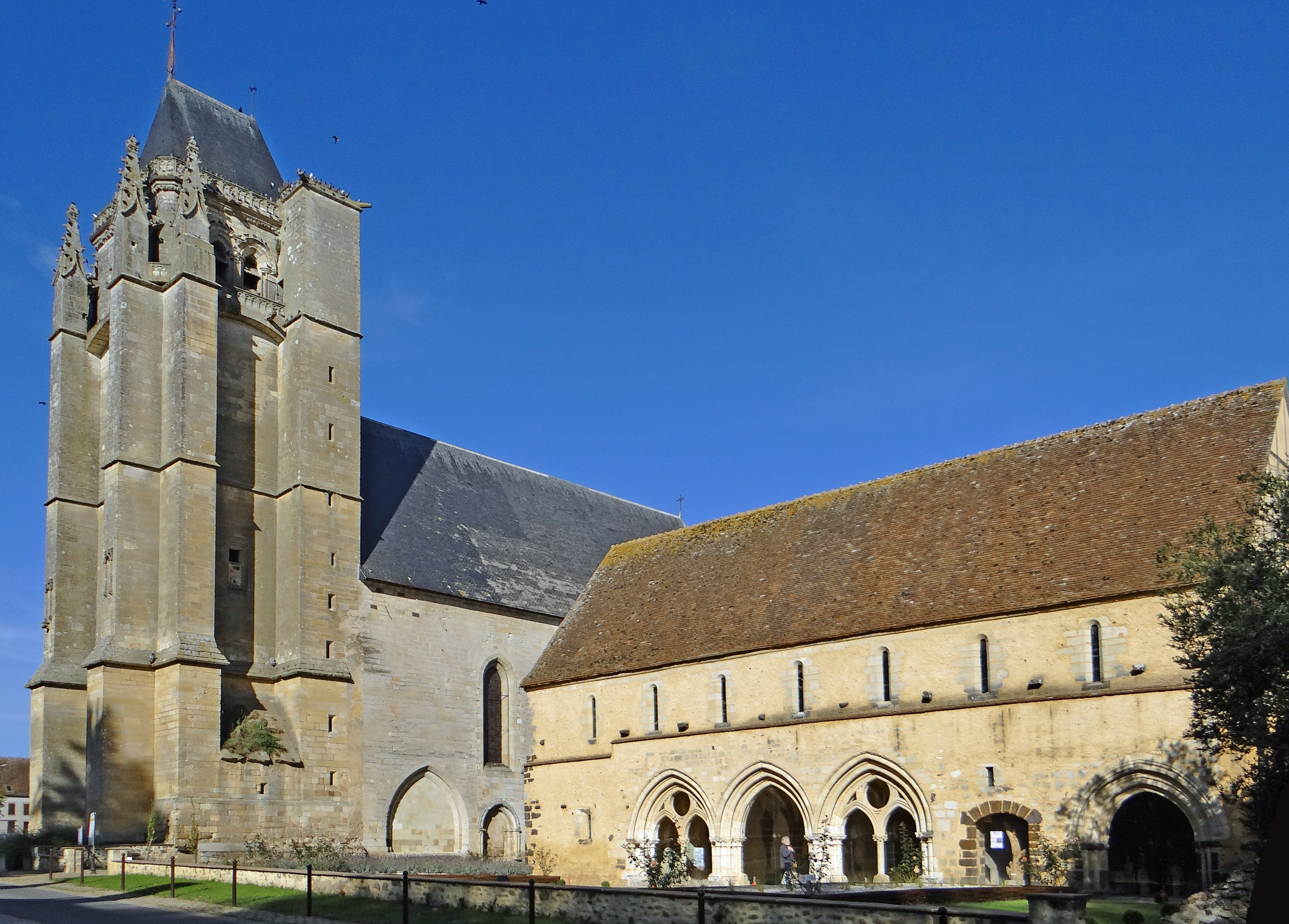
- The Abbey of Saint-Martin

- Coat of arms
- Location of Massay
- Location within France Location within Centre-Val de Loire
- Coordinates: 47°09′17″N 1°59′36″E
- Country: France
- Region: Centre-Val de Loire
- Department: Cher
- Arrondissement: Vierzon
- Canton: Mehun-sur-Yèvre
- Intercommunality: CC Vierzon-Sologne-Berry

Government
  - Mayor (2020–2026): Dominique Lévêque
- Area^{1}: 47.94 km^{2} (18.51 sq mi)
- Elevation: 123 m (404 ft)
- Highest elevation: 164 m (538 ft)
- Lowest elevation: 99 m (325 ft)
- Population (2023): 1,345
  - Density: 28.06/km^{2} (72.66/sq mi)
- Time zone: UTC+01:00 (CET)
  - Summer (DST): UTC+02:00 (CEST)
- INSEE/Postal code: 18140 /18120
- ^{1} French Land Register data, which excludes lakes, ponds, glaciers > 1 km^{2} (0.386 sq mi or 247 acres) and river estuaries.

Massay (French pronunciation: [masɛ]) is a commune in the Cher department in the Centre-Val de Loire region of France.

== Geography ==
An area of farming and forestry, comprising the village and several hamlets, the commune is situated by the banks of the river Garreau some 8 miles (13 km) south of Vierzon, at the junction of the A20 and the D75 roads.

== Transport ==
From Monday to Saturday there are a few buses to and from Vierzon.

== Population ==
Historical population
Year	Pop.	±% p.a.
1968	1,324	—
1975	1,251	−0.81%
1982	1,339	+0.98%
1990	1,354	+0.14%
1999	1,335	−0.16%
2007	1,425	+0.82%
2012	1,428	+0.04%
2017	1,390	−0.54%
2023	1,345	−0.55%
Source: INSEE

== Sights ==
- The church of St. Paxent, dating from the twelfth century.
- The thirteenth-century abbey buildings (Salle capitulaire). See Simon-Jérôme Bourlet de Vauxcelles, abbot of Massay
- The twelfth-century chapel of Saint-Loup.

== See also ==
- Communes of the Cher department
