= Allouis =

- Commune
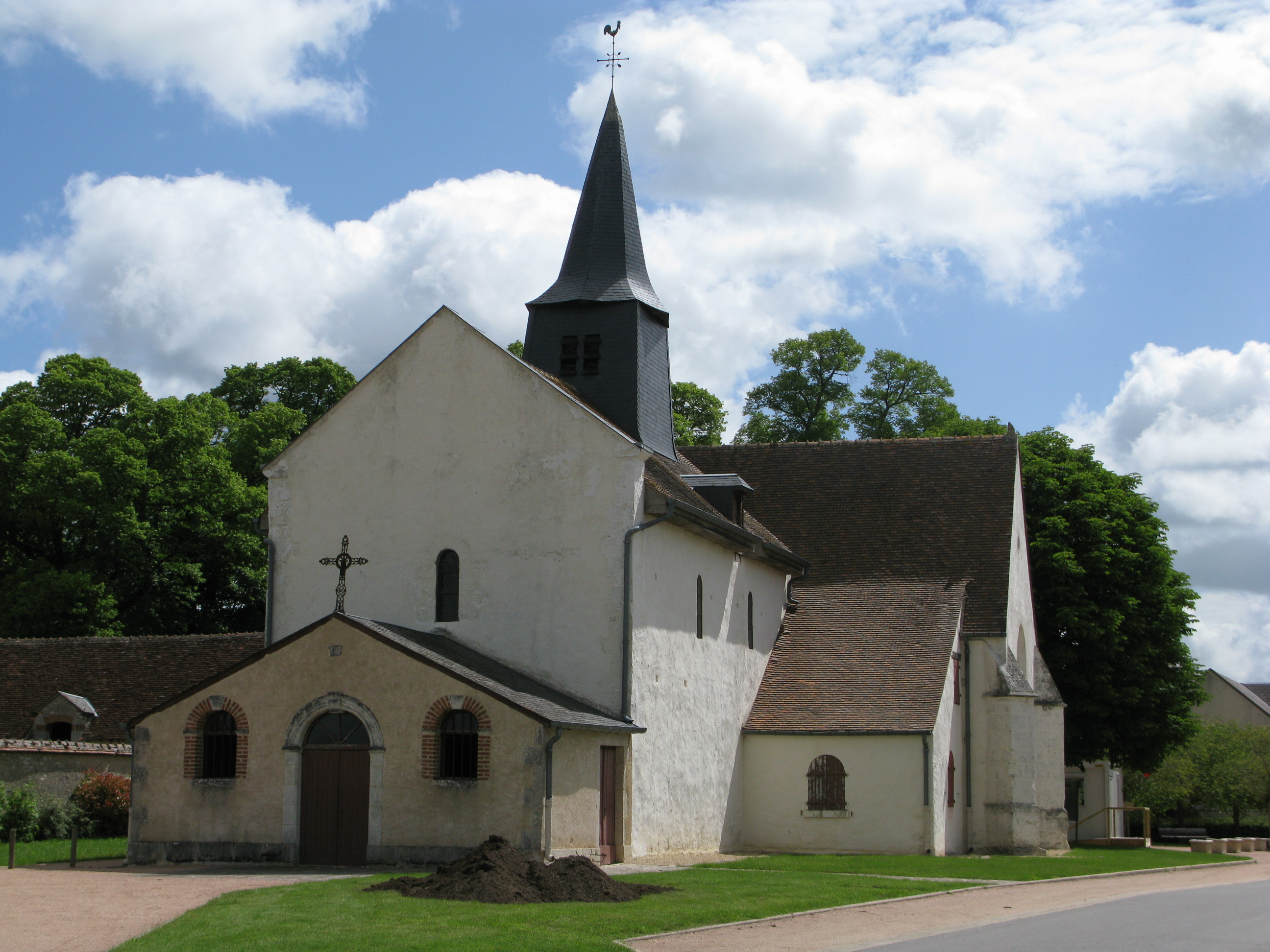
- The church in Allouis
- Location of Allouis
- Location within France Location within Centre-Val de Loire
- Coordinates: 47°09′58″N 2°13′38″E
- Country: France
- Region: Centre-Val de Loire
- Department: Cher
- Arrondissement: Vierzon
- Canton: Mehun-sur-Yèvre
- Intercommunality: CC Terres du Haut Berry

Government
  - Mayor (2020–2026): Annick Bienbeau
- Area^{1}: 35.59 km^{2} (13.74 sq mi)
- Elevation: 129 m (423 ft)
- Highest elevation: 129 m (423 ft)
- Lowest elevation: 126 m (413 ft)
- Population (2023): 1,036
  - Density: 29.11/km^{2} (75.39/sq mi)
- Time zone: UTC+01:00 (CET)
  - Summer (DST): UTC+02:00 (CEST)
- INSEE/Postal code: 18005 /18500
- ^{1} French Land Register data, which excludes lakes, ponds, glaciers > 1 km^{2} (0.386 sq mi or 247 acres) and river estuaries.

Allouis (French pronunciation: [alwi]) is a commune in the Cher department of the Centre-Val de Loire region of France in the valley of the river Yèvre, about 10 miles (16 km) northwest of Bourges.

== Population ==
Historical population
Year	Pop.	±% p.a.
1968	551	—
1975	562	+0.28%
1982	639	+1.85%
1990	706	+1.25%
1999	771	+0.98%
2007	908	+2.07%
2012	973	+1.39%
2017	1,071	+1.94%
2023	1,036	−0.55%
Source: INSEE

== Radio transmitter ==
Since 1939, the town of Allouis has housed the central transmitter station for long and short wave broadcasts of French national radio France Inter. In 1944, retreating German troops destroyed its four-latticed mast antenna system.

On 19 October 1952 a new long wave transmitter with an output of 250 kW was put into service at Allouis. Transmitting power was increased to 600 kW in 1957, to 1,000 kW in 1974 and to 2,000 kW in 1981.

Since 1977 the Allouis transmitter also transmits standard time signals for AMDS.

The radio channel France Inter discontinued the longwave transmitting (162 kHz) end of 2016.

== See also ==
- Communes of the Cher department
