= Foëcy =

- Commune
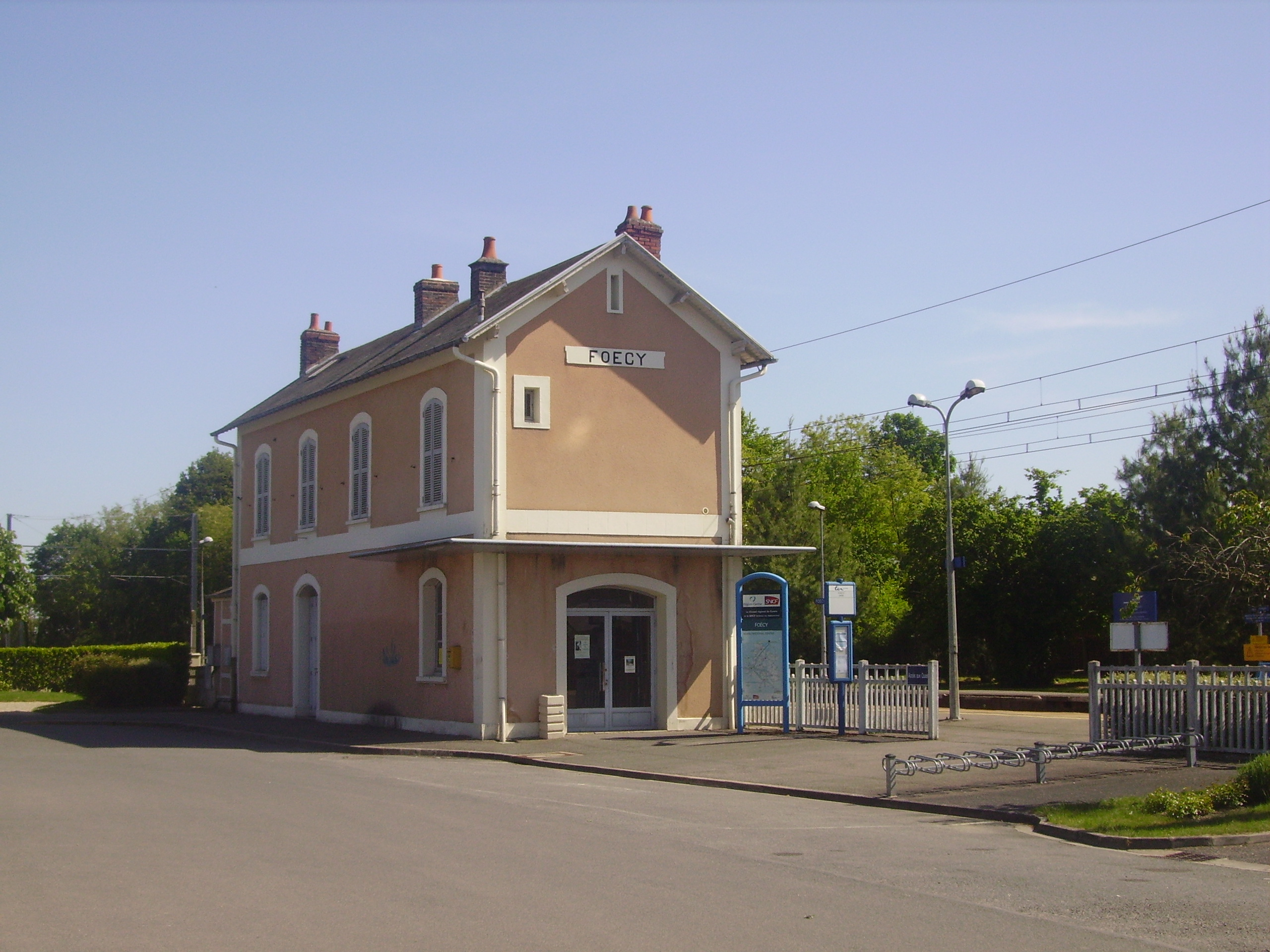
- Railway station
- Location of Foëcy
- Location within France Location within Centre-Val de Loire
- Coordinates: 47°10′41″N 2°09′45″E
- Country: France
- Region: Centre-Val de Loire
- Department: Cher
- Arrondissement: Vierzon
- Canton: Mehun-sur-Yèvre
- Intercommunality: CC Vierzon-Sologne-Berry

Government
  - Mayor (2020–2026): Laure Grenier-Rignoux
- Area^{1}: 16.21 km^{2} (6.26 sq mi)
- Elevation: 116 m (381 ft)
- Highest elevation: 127 m (417 ft)
- Lowest elevation: 97 m (318 ft)
- Population (2023): 2,046
  - Density: 126.2/km^{2} (326.9/sq mi)
- Time zone: UTC+01:00 (CET)
  - Summer (DST): UTC+02:00 (CEST)
- INSEE/Postal code: 18096 /18500
- ^{1} French Land Register data, which excludes lakes, ponds, glaciers > 1 km^{2} (0.386 sq mi or 247 acres) and river estuaries.

Foëcy (French pronunciation: [fwasi]) is a commune in the department of Cher, in the region of Centre-Val de Loire, France.

== Geography ==
An area of lakes, streams and farming comprising the village and two hamlets, situated in the valleys of both the river Yèvre and the Cher, some 5 miles (8.0 km) southeast of Vierzon at the junction of the D60 and the D30 roads. The disused Canal de Berry, the A71 and the TER railway all pass through the territory of the commune.

== Population ==
Historical population
Year	Pop.	±% p.a.
1968	1,701	—
1975	2,010	+2.41%
1982	2,185	+1.20%
1990	2,083	−0.60%
1999	2,003	−0.43%
2007	2,071	+0.42%
2012	2,063	−0.08%
2017	2,085	+0.21%
2023	2,046	−0.31%
Source: INSEE

== Sights ==
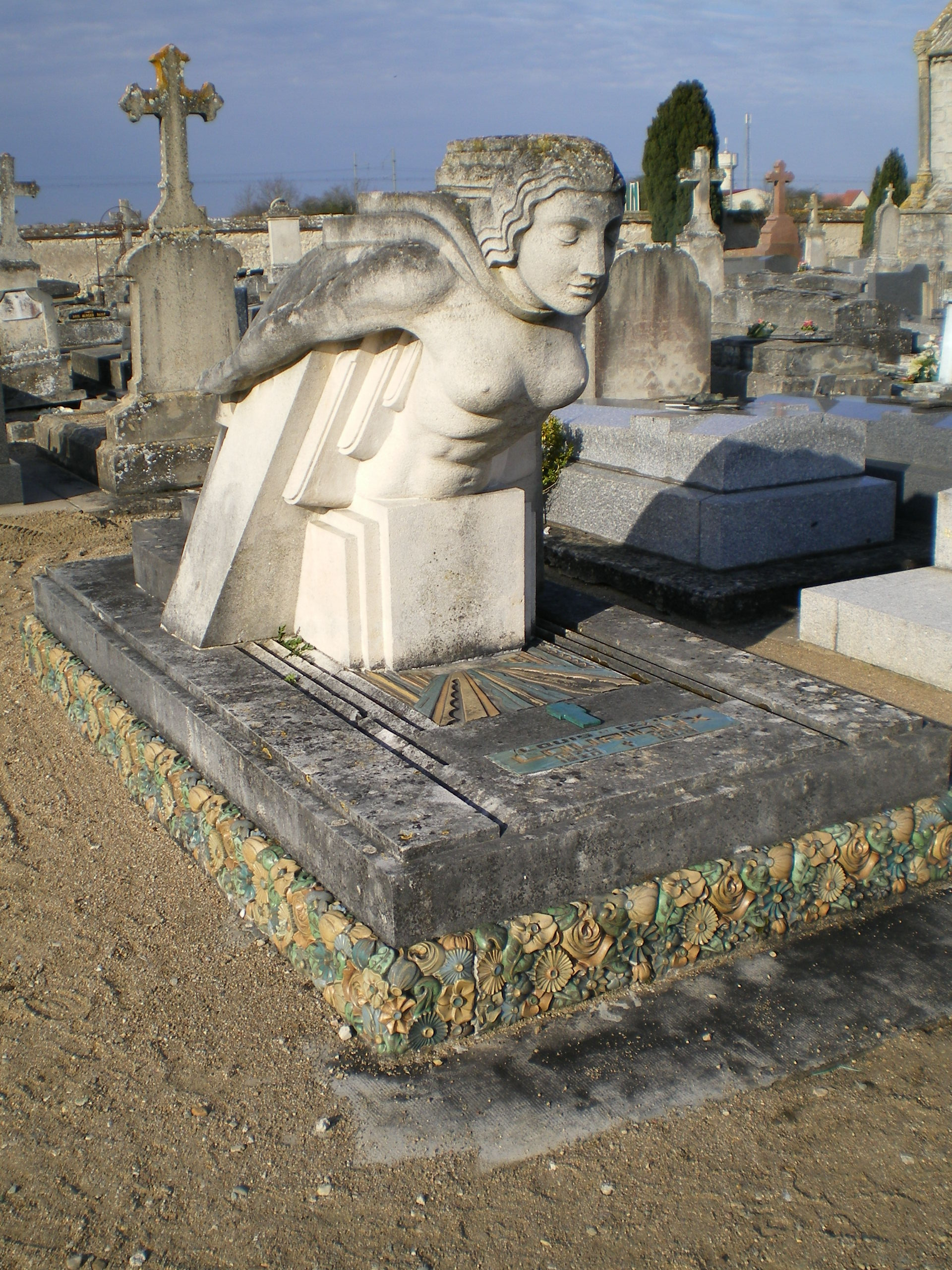
The tomb of ceramicist Louis Lourioux

- A war memorial.
- The tomb of Louis Lourioux (French link)
- The church of St. Denis, dating from the nineteenth century.
- The eighteenth-century chateau, with parts from a feudal castle.
- A museum of porcelain.

== See also ==
- Communes of the Cher department
