= Limeux, Cher =

Limeux
- Commune
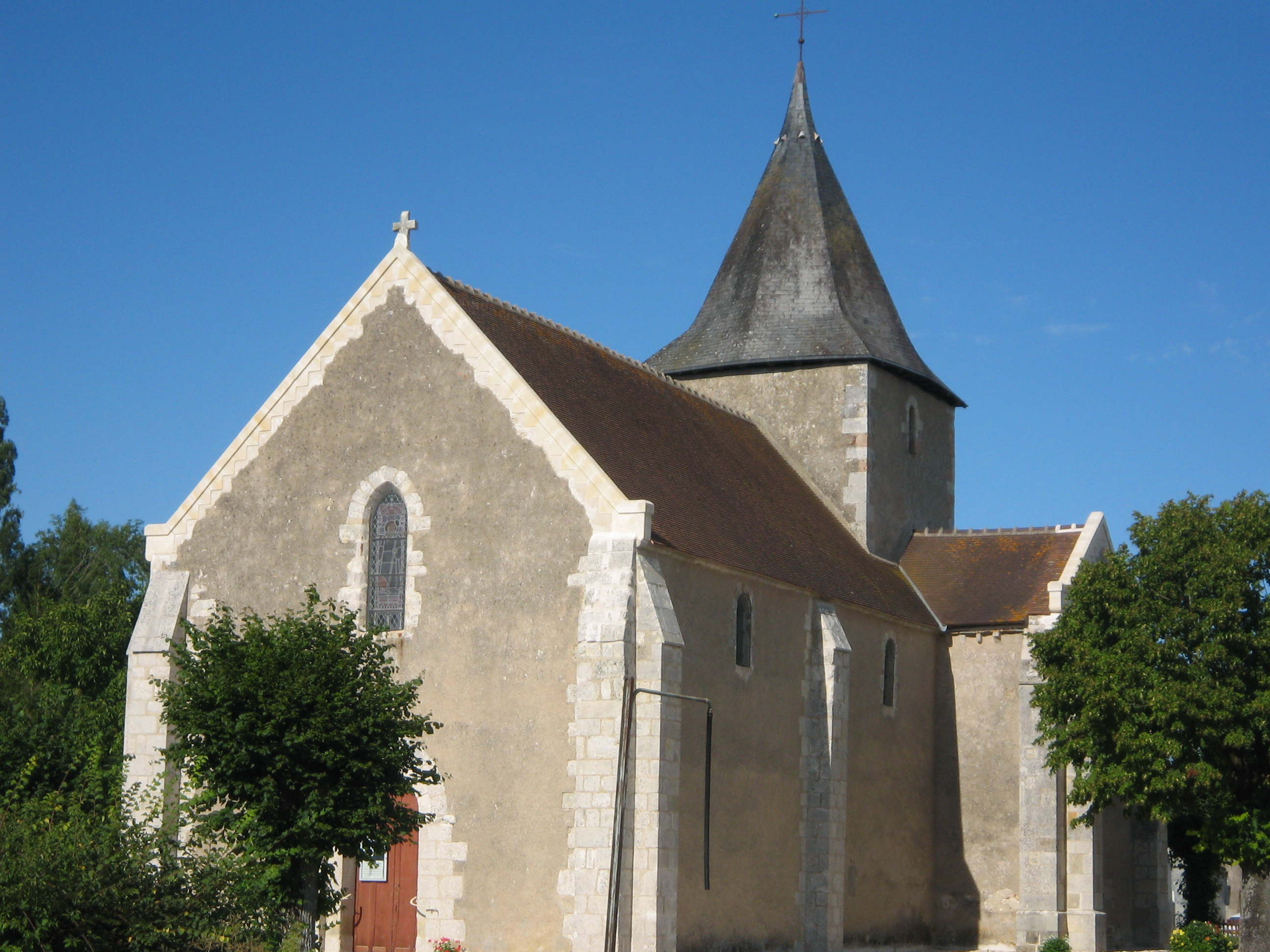
- The church in Limeux

- Coat of arms
- Location of Limeux
- Location within France Location within Centre-Val de Loire
- Coordinates: 47°04′32″N 2°06′34″E
- Country: France
- Region: Centre-Val de Loire
- Department: Cher
- Arrondissement: Vierzon
- Canton: Mehun-sur-Yèvre
- Intercommunality: CC Cœur de Berry

Government
  - Mayor (2020–2026): Julien Yvon
- Area^{1}: 13.17 km^{2} (5.08 sq mi)
- Elevation: 140 m (460 ft)
- Highest elevation: 149 m (489 ft)
- Lowest elevation: 127 m (417 ft)
- Population (2023): 166
  - Density: 12.6/km^{2} (32.6/sq mi)
- Time zone: UTC+01:00 (CET)
  - Summer (DST): UTC+02:00 (CEST)
- INSEE/Postal code: 18128 /18120
- ^{1} French Land Register data, which excludes lakes, ponds, glaciers > 1 km^{2} (0.386 sq mi or 247 acres) and river estuaries.

Limeux (French pronunciation: [limø]) is a commune in the Cher department in the Centre-Val de Loire region of France.

== Geography ==
Limeux is between the valleys of the Cher and Arnon rivers about 12 miles (19 km) south of Vierzon at the junction of the D23 and the D123 roads.

== Population ==
Historical population
Year	Pop.	±% p.a.
1968	163	—
1975	144	−1.75%
1982	133	−1.13%
1990	158	+2.18%
1999	145	−0.95%
2007	149	+0.34%
2012	153	+0.53%
2017	162	+1.15%
2023	166	+0.41%
Source: INSEE

== See also ==
- Communes of the Cher department
