= Lazenay =

- Commune
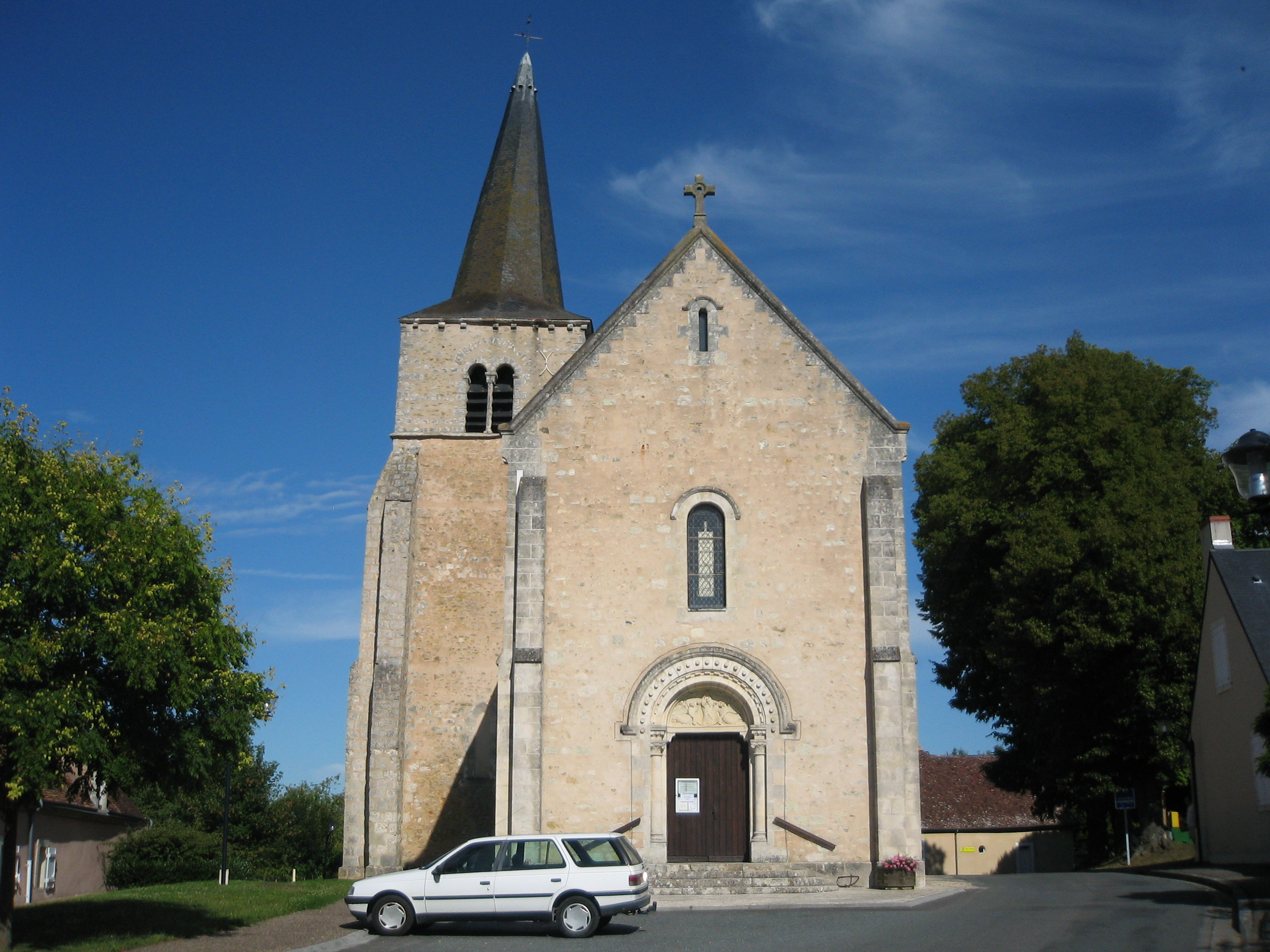
- The church in Lazenay
- Location of Lazenay
- Location within France Location within Centre-Val de Loire
- Coordinates: 47°04′19″N 2°03′41″E
- Country: France
- Region: Centre-Val de Loire
- Department: Cher
- Arrondissement: Vierzon
- Canton: Mehun-sur-Yèvre
- Intercommunality: CC Cœur de Berry

Government
  - Mayor (2020–2026): James Goussard
- Area^{1}: 30.74 km^{2} (11.87 sq mi)
- Elevation: 210 m (690 ft)
- Highest elevation: 153 m (502 ft)
- Lowest elevation: 107 m (351 ft)
- Population (2023): 276
  - Density: 8.98/km^{2} (23.3/sq mi)
- Time zone: UTC+01:00 (CET)
  - Summer (DST): UTC+02:00 (CEST)
- INSEE/Postal code: 18124 /18120
- ^{1} French Land Register data, which excludes lakes, ponds, glaciers > 1 km^{2} (0.386 sq mi or 247 acres) and river estuaries.

Lazenay (French pronunciation: [laznɛ]) is a commune in the Cher department in the Centre-Val de Loire region of France.

== Geography ==
A farming area comprising the village and a couple of hamlets, situated at the confluence of the rivers Arnon and Théols, some 12 miles (19 km) south of Vierzon at the junction of the D18, D23, D918 and the D229 roads.

== Population ==
Historical population
Year	Pop.	±% p.a.
1968	413	—
1975	337	−2.86%
1982	300	−1.65%
1990	326	+1.04%
1999	354	+0.92%
2007	353	−0.04%
2012	353	+0.00%
2017	342	−0.63%
2023	276	−3.51%
Source: INSEE

== Sights ==
- The church of Notre-Dame, dating from the sixteenth century.
- The château of La Ferté, built in 1659.
- Two watermills.

== Personalities ==
- Rémy Pointereau, politician, was born here on 30 March 1953.

== See also ==
- Communes of the Cher department
