= Chéry =

- Commune
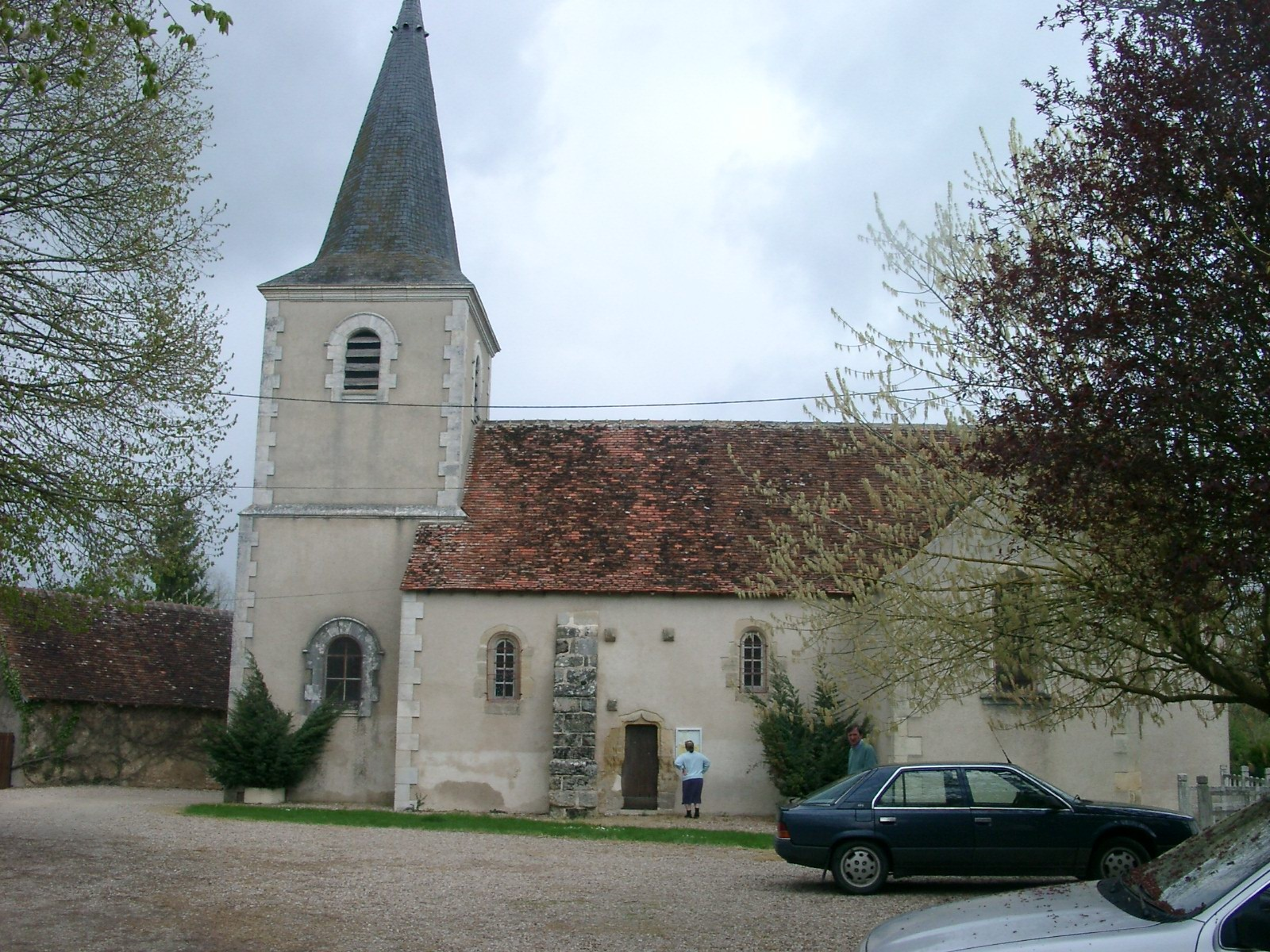
- The church in Chéry

- Coat of arms
- Location of Chéry
- Location within France Location within Centre-Val de Loire
- Coordinates: 47°07′15″N 2°02′50″E
- Country: France
- Region: Centre-Val de Loire
- Department: Cher
- Arrondissement: Vierzon
- Canton: Mehun-sur-Yèvre
- Intercommunality: CC Cœur de Berry

Government
  - Mayor (2020–2026): Damien Prely
- Area^{1}: 13.54 km^{2} (5.23 sq mi)
- Elevation: 100 m (330 ft)
- Highest elevation: 161 m (528 ft)
- Lowest elevation: 104 m (341 ft)
- Population (2023): 233
  - Density: 17.2/km^{2} (44.6/sq mi)
- Time zone: UTC+01:00 (CET)
  - Summer (DST): UTC+02:00 (CEST)
- INSEE/Postal code: 18064 /18120
- ^{1} French Land Register data, which excludes lakes, ponds, glaciers > 1 km^{2} (0.386 sq mi or 247 acres) and river estuaries.

Chéry (French pronunciation: [ʃeʁi]) is a commune in the Cher department in the Centre-Val de Loire region of France.

== Geography ==
An area of farming and forestry, comprising the main village and a hamlet, situated in the valley of the river Arnon some 8 miles (13 km) south of Vierzon, at the junction of the D75, D165 and the D68 roads.

== Population ==
Historical population
Year	Pop.	±% p.a.
1968	306	—
1975	276	−1.46%
1982	266	−0.53%
1990	268	+0.09%
1999	236	−1.40%
2007	221	−0.82%
2012	216	−0.46%
2017	214	−0.19%
2023	233	+1.43%
Source: INSEE

== Sights ==
- The church of St. Didier, dating from the sixteenth century.

== See also ==
- Communes of the Cher department
