= Lury-sur-Arnon =

- Commune
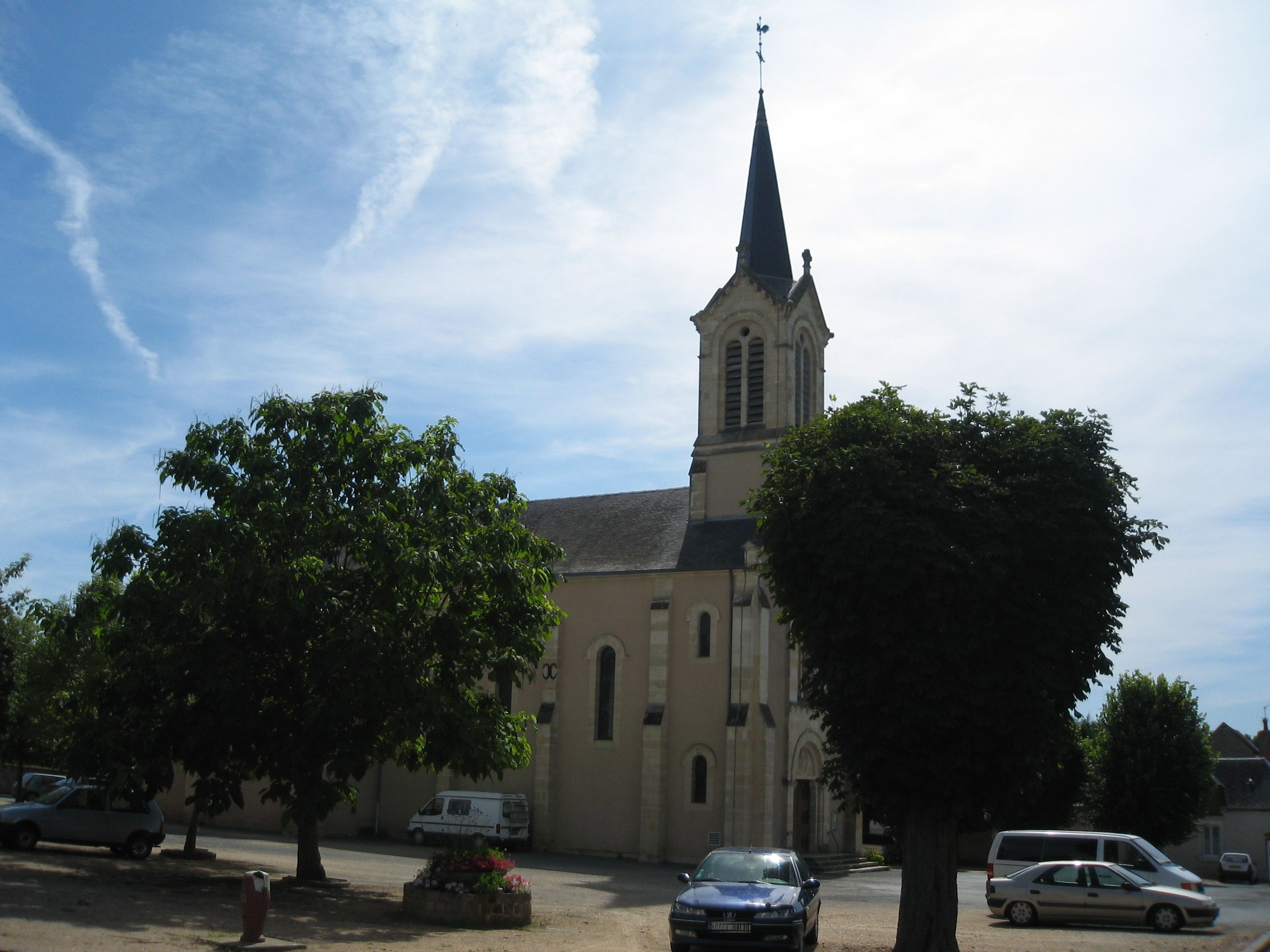
- The church of Saint Paul, in Lury-sur-Arnon

- Coat of arms
- Location of Lury-sur-Arnon
- Location within France Location within Centre-Val de Loire
- Coordinates: 47°07′42″N 2°03′28″E
- Country: France
- Region: Centre-Val de Loire
- Department: Cher
- Arrondissement: Vierzon
- Canton: Mehun-sur-Yèvre
- Intercommunality: CC Cœur de Berry

Government
  - Mayor (2020–2026): Chantal Crepat-Virolle
- Area^{1}: 13.84 km^{2} (5.34 sq mi)
- Elevation: 115 m (377 ft)
- Highest elevation: 138 m (453 ft)
- Lowest elevation: 103 m (338 ft)
- Population (2023): 648
  - Density: 46.8/km^{2} (121/sq mi)
- Time zone: UTC+01:00 (CET)
  - Summer (DST): UTC+02:00 (CEST)
- INSEE/Postal code: 18134 /18120
- ^{1} French Land Register data, which excludes lakes, ponds, glaciers > 1 km^{2} (0.386 sq mi or 247 acres) and river estuaries.

Lury-sur-Arnon (French pronunciation: [lyʁi syʁ aʁnɔ̃], literally Lury on Arnon) is a commune in the Cher department in the Centre-Val de Loire region of France.

== Geography ==
An ancient fortified farming village situated by the river Arnon, some 7 miles (11 km) south of Vierzon at the junction of the D30, D918 and the D68 roads.

== Population ==
Historical population
Year	Pop.	±% p.a.
1968	612	—
1975	528	−2.09%
1982	566	+1.00%
1990	644	+1.63%
1999	671	+0.46%
2007	688	+0.31%
2012	714	+0.74%
2017	668	−1.32%
2023	648	−0.51%
Source: INSEE

== Sights ==
- The church of St. Paul, dating from the nineteenth century.
- The castle, dating from the twelfth century.
- The restored Gothic chapel.
- A twelfth-century gatehouse tower.

== See also ==
- Communes of the Cher department
