= Berry-Bouy =

- Commune
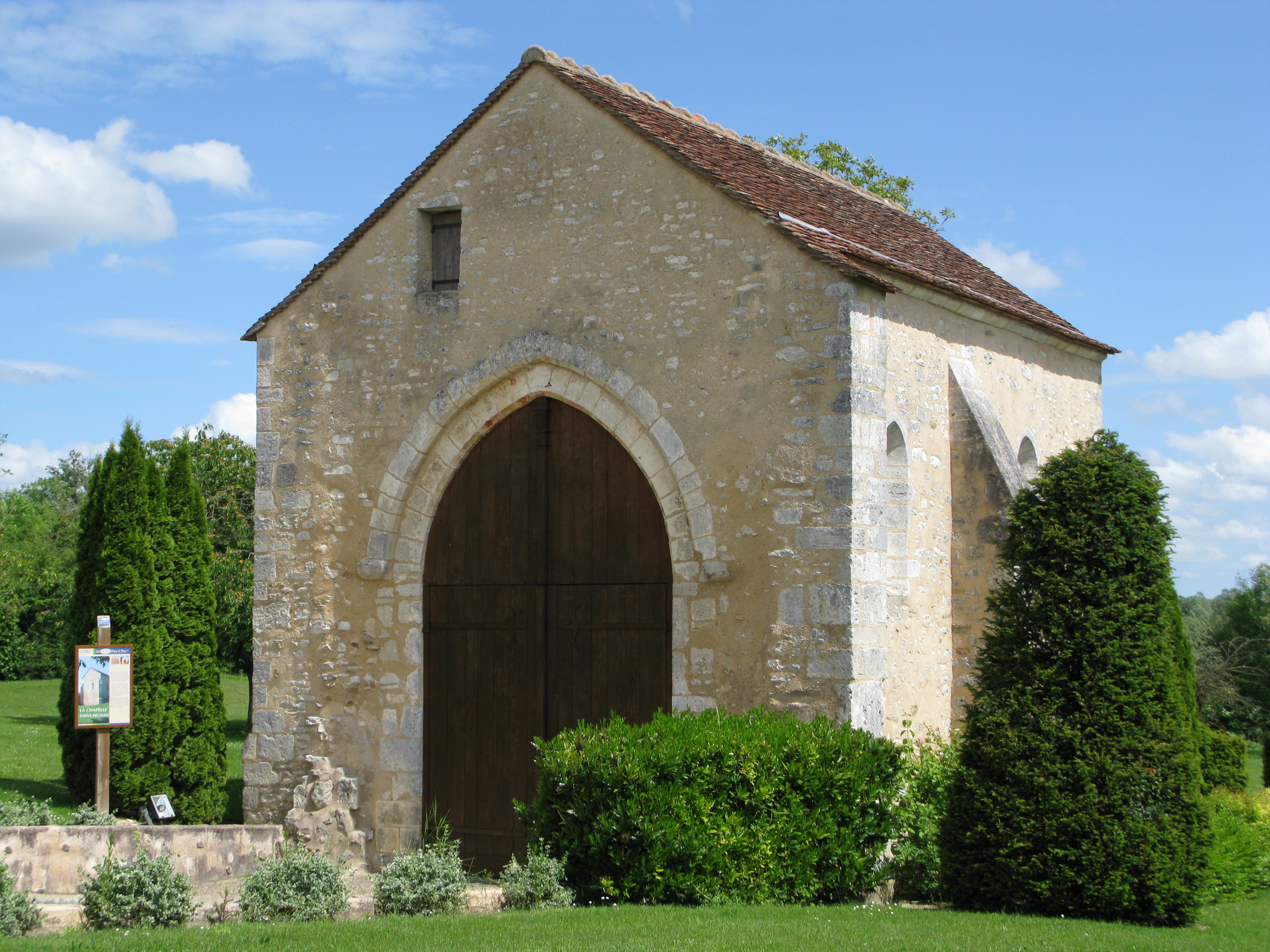
- The Chapel of Saint-Aignan, in Berry-Bouy
- Location of Berry-Bouy
- Location within France Location within Centre-Val de Loire
- Coordinates: 47°06′38″N 2°17′25″E
- Country: France
- Region: Centre-Val de Loire
- Department: Cher
- Arrondissement: Vierzon
- Canton: Mehun-sur-Yèvre
- Intercommunality: CA Bourges Plus

Government
  - Mayor (2020–2026): Bernadette Goin-Demay
- Area^{1}: 30.87 km^{2} (11.92 sq mi)
- Elevation: 138 m (453 ft)
- Highest elevation: 162 m (531 ft)
- Lowest elevation: 113 m (371 ft)
- Population (2023): 1,168
  - Density: 37.84/km^{2} (98.00/sq mi)
- Time zone: UTC+01:00 (CET)
  - Summer (DST): UTC+02:00 (CEST)
- INSEE/Postal code: 18028 /18500
- ^{1} French Land Register data, which excludes lakes, ponds, glaciers > 1 km^{2} (0.386 sq mi or 247 acres) and river estuaries.

Berry-Bouy (French pronunciation: [beʁi bwi]) is a commune in the Cher department in the Centre-Val de Loire region of France in the Yèvre river valley, about 5 miles (8.0 km) northwest of Bourges.

== Population ==
Historical population
Year	Pop.	±% p.a.
1968	501	—
1975	612	+2.90%
1982	807	+4.03%
1990	966	+2.27%
1999	934	−0.37%
2007	1,113	+2.22%
2012	1,195	+1.43%
2017	1,189	−0.10%
2023	1,168	−0.30%
Source: INSEE

== See also ==
- Communes of the Cher department
