= Mehun-sur-Yèvre =

- Commune
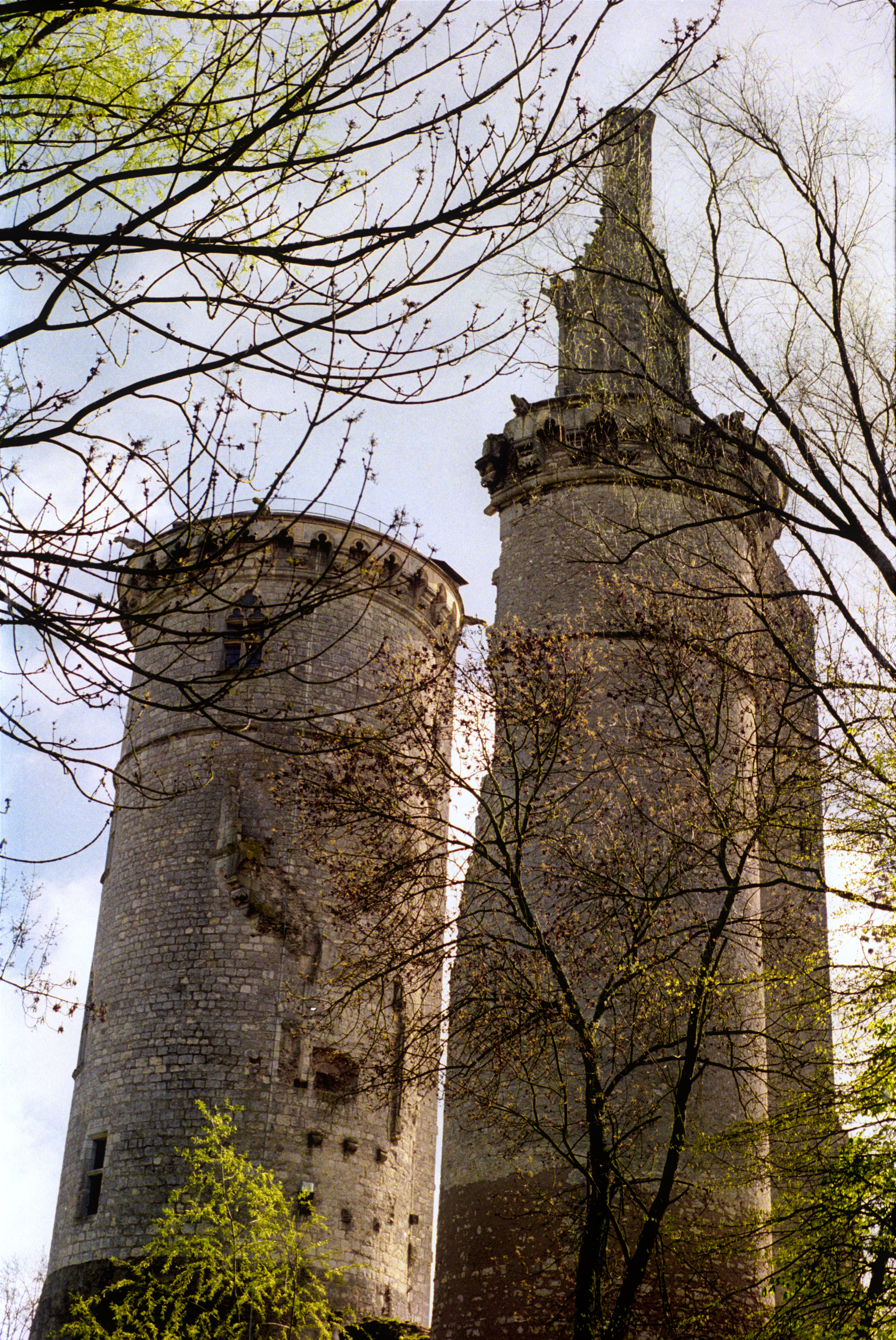
- The castle ruins, Chateaux-musée Charles VII

- Coat of arms
- Location of Mehun-sur-Yèvre
- Location within France Location within Centre-Val de Loire
- Coordinates: 47°09′00″N 2°13′00″E
- Country: France
- Region: Centre-Val de Loire
- Department: Cher
- Arrondissement: Vierzon
- Canton: Mehun-sur-Yèvre
- Intercommunality: CA Bourges Plus

Government
  - Mayor (2020–2026): Jean-Louis Salak
- Area^{1}: 24.45 km^{2} (9.44 sq mi)
- Elevation: 122 m (400 ft)
- Highest elevation: 137 m (449 ft)
- Lowest elevation: 107 m (351 ft)
- Population (2023): 6,380
  - Density: 261/km^{2} (676/sq mi)
- Time zone: UTC+01:00 (CET)
  - Summer (DST): UTC+02:00 (CEST)
- INSEE/Postal code: 18141 /18500
- ^{1} French Land Register data, which excludes lakes, ponds, glaciers > 1 km^{2} (0.386 sq mi or 247 acres) and river estuaries.

Mehun-sur-Yèvre (French pronunciation: [məœ̃ syʁ jɛvʁ], lit. 'Mehun on Yèvre') is a commune in the Cher department in central France.

== Population ==
Historical population

Year	Pop.	±% p.a.
1793	1,669	—
1800	2,187	+3.94%
1806	2,499	+2.25%
1821	2,949	+1.11%
1831	3,310	+1.16%
1836	3,557	+1.45%
1841	3,333	−1.29%
1846	4,097	+4.21%
1851	4,260	+0.78%
1856	4,803	+2.43%
1861	5,471	+2.64%
1866	6,176	+2.45%
1872	6,501	+0.86%
1876	6,326	−0.68%
1881	6,350	+0.08%
1886	6,591	+0.75%
1891	6,572	−0.06%
1896	6,334	−0.74%
1901	6,345	+0.03%

Year	Pop.	±% p.a.
1906	6,397	+0.16%
1911	6,177	−0.70%
1921	5,382	−1.37%
1926	5,337	−0.17%
1931	5,112	−0.86%
1936	5,049	−0.25%
1946	5,290	+0.47%
1954	5,397	+0.25%
1962	5,700	+0.69%
1968	5,893	+0.56%
1975	6,902	+2.28%
1982	7,178	+0.56%
1990	7,227	+0.09%
1999	7,212	−0.02%
2007	6,889	−0.57%
2012	6,828	−0.18%
2017	6,562	−0.79%
2023	6,380	−0.47%

Source: EHESS and INSEE (1968-2023)

== Economy ==
The French porcelain manufacturer Pillivuyt is based locally.

== See also ==
- Communes of the Cher department
