= Cerbois =

- Commune
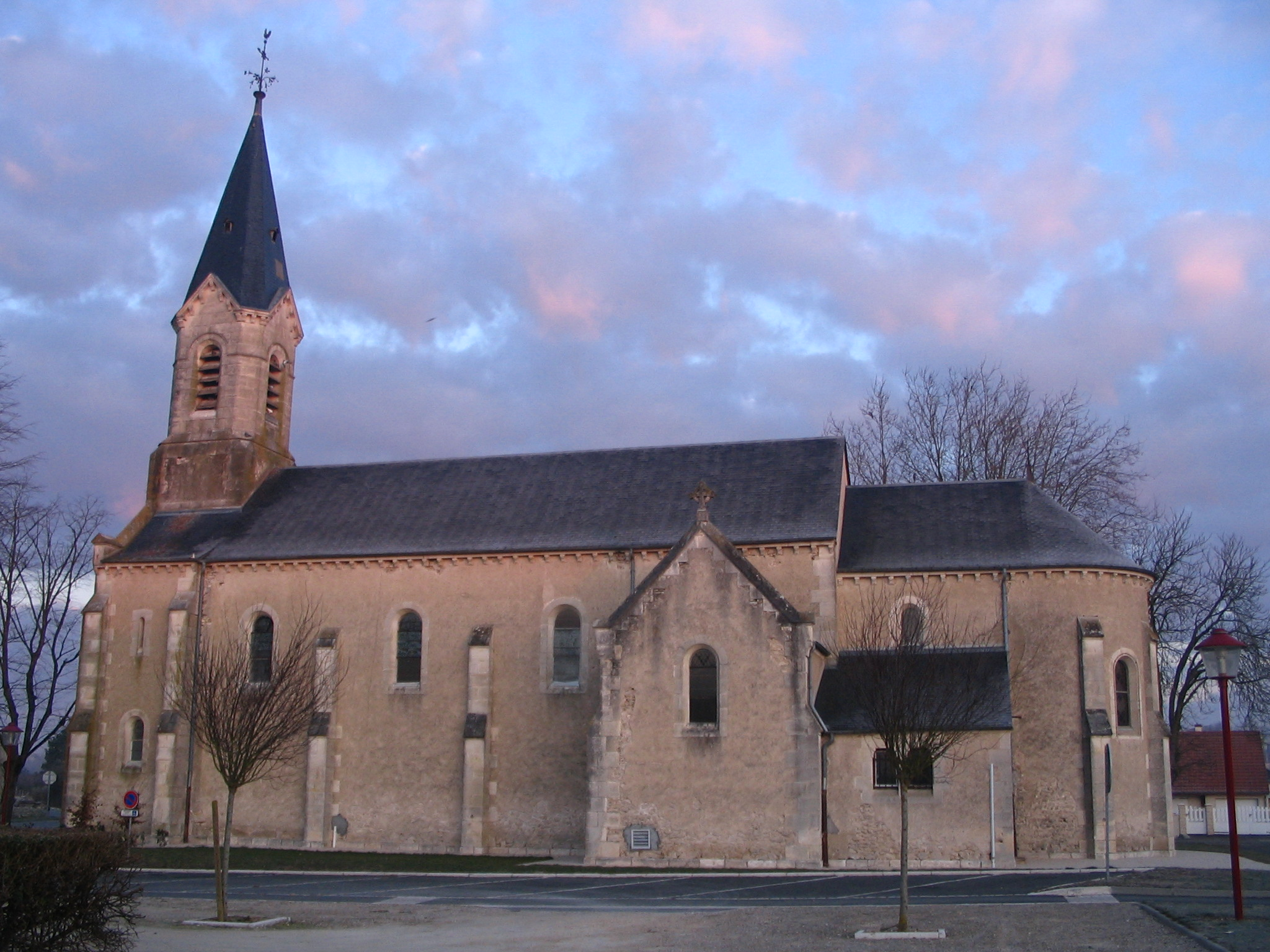
- The church of Saint-Martin

- Coat of arms
- Location of Cerbois
- Location within France Location within Centre-Val de Loire
- Coordinates: 47°06′50″N 2°05′39″E
- Country: France
- Region: Centre-Val de Loire
- Department: Cher
- Arrondissement: Vierzon
- Canton: Mehun-sur-Yèvre
- Intercommunality: CC Cœur de Berry

Government
  - Mayor (2020–2026): Muriel Lecleir
- Area^{1}: 18.45 km^{2} (7.12 sq mi)
- Elevation: 130 m (430 ft)
- Highest elevation: 142 m (466 ft)
- Lowest elevation: 118 m (387 ft)
- Population (2023): 393
  - Density: 21.3/km^{2} (55.2/sq mi)
- Time zone: UTC+01:00 (CET)
  - Summer (DST): UTC+02:00 (CEST)
- INSEE/Postal code: 18044 /18120
- ^{1} French Land Register data, which excludes lakes, ponds, glaciers > 1 km^{2} (0.386 sq mi or 247 acres) and river estuaries.

Cerbois (French pronunciation: [sɛʁbwa]) is a commune in the Cher department in the Centre-Val de Loire region of France.

== Geography ==
An area of farming and forestry, comprising the main village and a couple of hamlets, situated in the valley of the river Arnon some 9 miles (14 km) south of Vierzon, at the junction of the D20, D113 and the D123 roads.

== Population ==
Historical population
Year	Pop.	±% p.a.
1968	296	—
1975	264	−1.62%
1982	253	−0.61%
1990	313	+2.70%
1999	359	+1.54%
2007	428	+2.22%
2012	453	+1.14%
2017	435	−0.81%
2023	393	−1.68%
Source: INSEE

== Sights ==
- The church, dating from the twentieth century
- The fifteenth-century chateau

== See also ==
- Communes of the Cher department
