= Brinay, Cher =

Brinay
- Commune
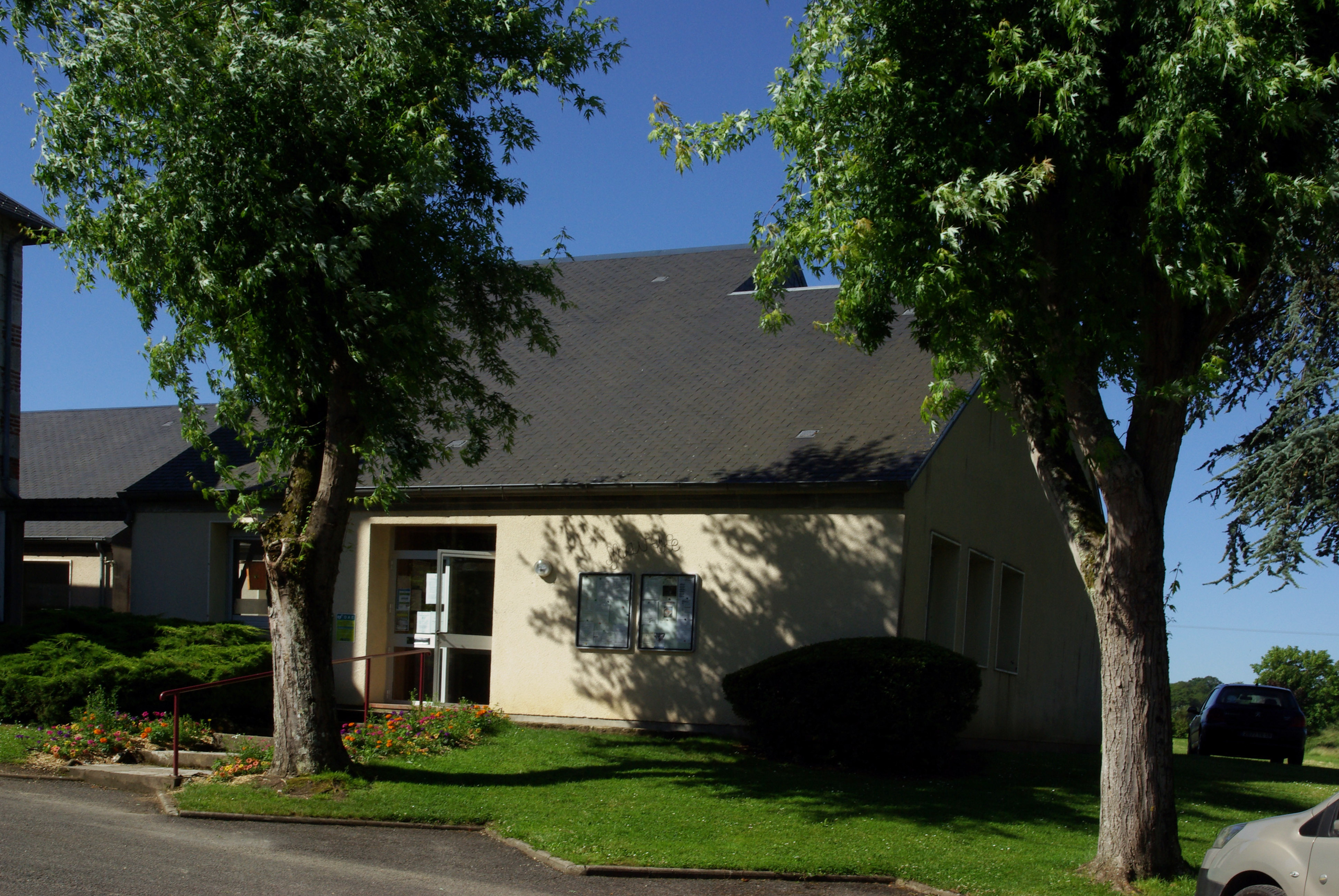
- Town hall
- Location of Brinay
- Location within France Location within Centre-Val de Loire
- Coordinates: 47°10′42″N 2°07′43″E
- Country: France
- Region: Centre-Val de Loire
- Department: Cher
- Arrondissement: Vierzon
- Canton: Mehun-sur-Yèvre
- Intercommunality: CC Cœur de Berry

Government
  - Mayor (2020–2026): Bernard Baucher
- Area^{1}: 29.48 km^{2} (11.38 sq mi)
- Elevation: 120 m (390 ft)
- Highest elevation: 137 m (449 ft)
- Lowest elevation: 97 m (318 ft)
- Population (2023): 490
  - Density: 17/km^{2} (43/sq mi)
- Time zone: UTC+01:00 (CET)
  - Summer (DST): UTC+02:00 (CEST)
- INSEE/Postal code: 18036 /18120
- ^{1} French Land Register data, which excludes lakes, ponds, glaciers > 1 km^{2} (0.386 sq mi or 247 acres) and river estuaries.

Brinay (French pronunciation: [bʁinɛ]) is a commune in the Cher department in the Centre-Val de Loire region of France, consisting of a village and five hamlets by the banks of the river Cher about 8 kilometres (5.0 mi) southeast of Vierzon.

== Population ==
Historical population
Year	Pop.	±% p.a.
1968	318	—
1975	329	+0.49%
1982	452	+4.64%
1990	546	+2.39%
1999	467	−1.72%
2007	499	+0.83%
2012	528	+1.14%
2017	522	−0.23%
2023	490	−1.05%
Source: INSEE

== See also ==
- Communes of the Cher department
