= Preuilly, Cher =

Preuilly
- Commune
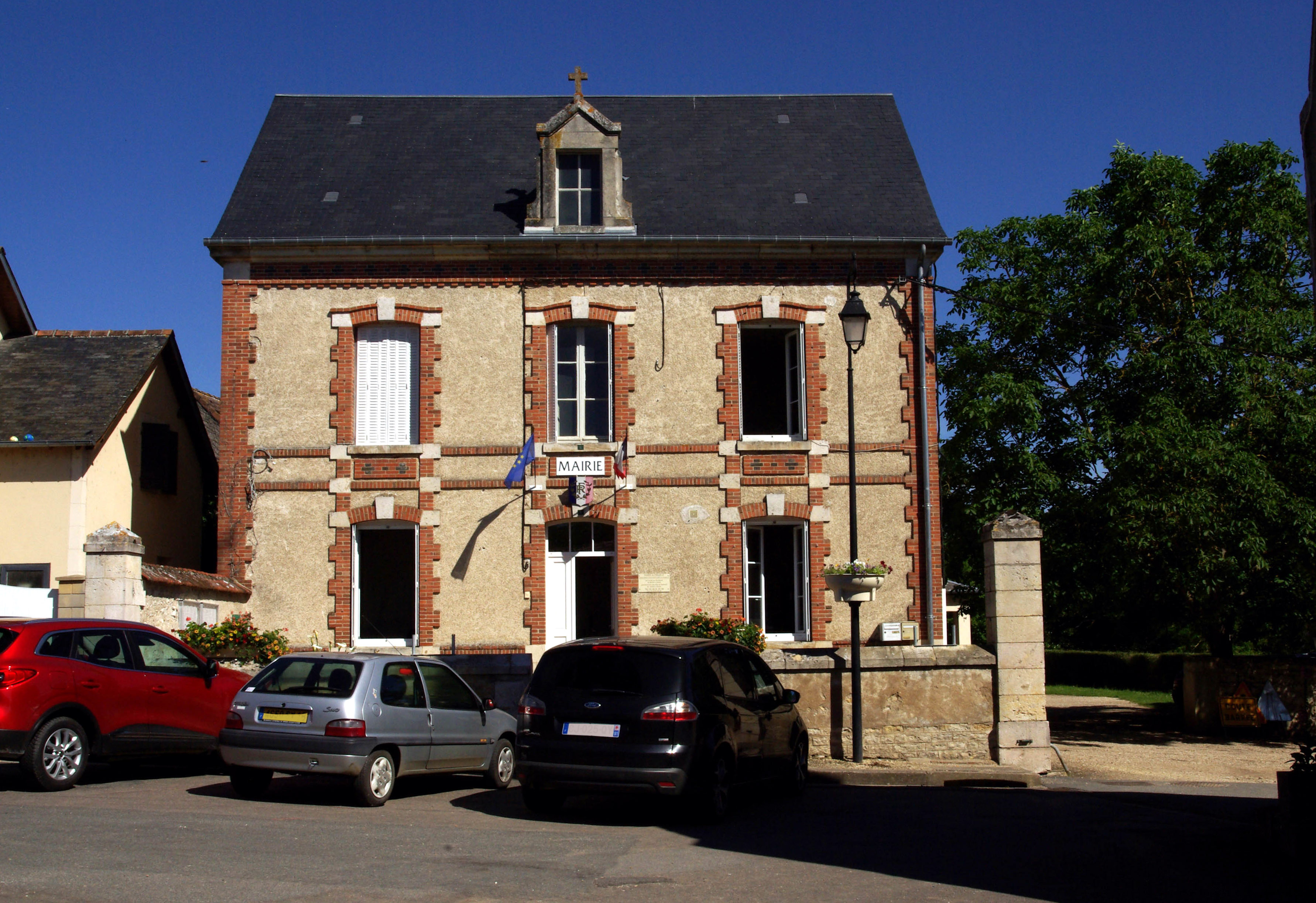
- Town hall
- Location of Preuilly
- Location within France Location within Centre-Val de Loire
- Coordinates: 47°05′45″N 2°10′39″E
- Country: France
- Region: Centre-Val de Loire
- Department: Cher
- Arrondissement: Vierzon
- Canton: Mehun-sur-Yèvre
- Intercommunality: CC Cœur de Berry

Government
  - Mayor (2020–2026): Olivier Hochedel
- Area^{1}: 14.94 km^{2} (5.77 sq mi)
- Elevation: 112 m (367 ft)
- Highest elevation: 142 m (466 ft)
- Lowest elevation: 107 m (351 ft)
- Population (2023): 477
  - Density: 31.9/km^{2} (82.7/sq mi)
- Time zone: UTC+01:00 (CET)
  - Summer (DST): UTC+02:00 (CEST)
- INSEE/Postal code: 18186 /18120
- ^{1} French Land Register data, which excludes lakes, ponds, glaciers > 1 km^{2} (0.386 sq mi or 247 acres) and river estuaries.

Preuilly (French pronunciation: [pʁœji]) is a commune in the Cher department in the Centre-Val de Loire region of France.

== Geography ==
A valley area of lakes, woods and farming comprising the village and several hamlets, situated by the river Cher, some 10 miles (16 km) southeast of Vierzon at the junction of the D27, D113 and the D23 roads.

== Population ==
Historical population
Year	Pop.	±% p.a.
1968	301	—
1975	281	−0.98%
1982	342	+2.85%
1990	368	+0.92%
1999	432	+1.80%
2007	470	+1.06%
2012	449	−0.91%
2017	441	−0.36%
2023	477	+1.32%
Source: INSEE

== Sights ==
- The church of St. Jean, dating from the twelfth century.
- A double feudal motte.

== See also ==
- Communes of the Cher department
