= Arnon (river) =

River in central France

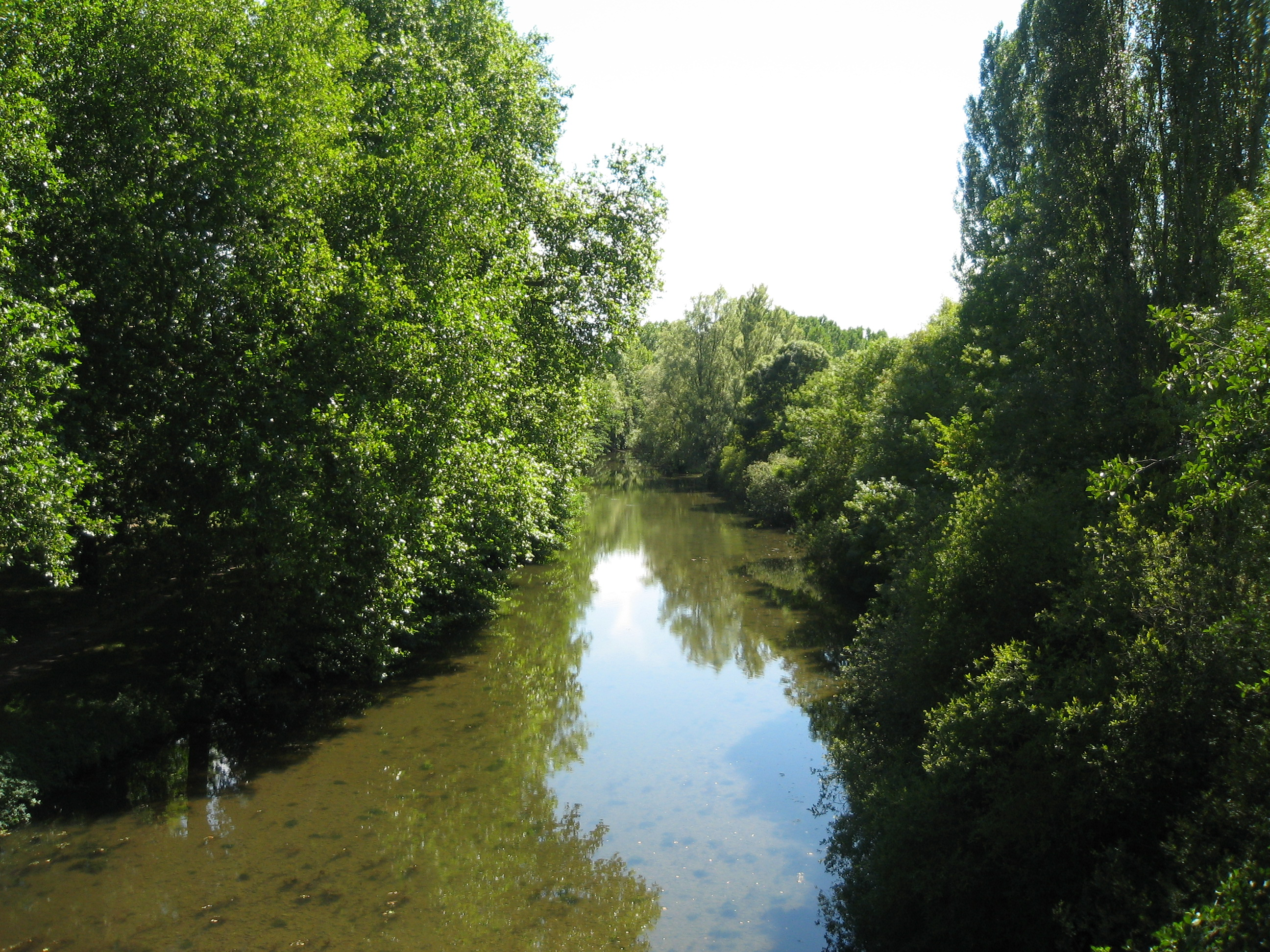
- The Arnon at Chârost

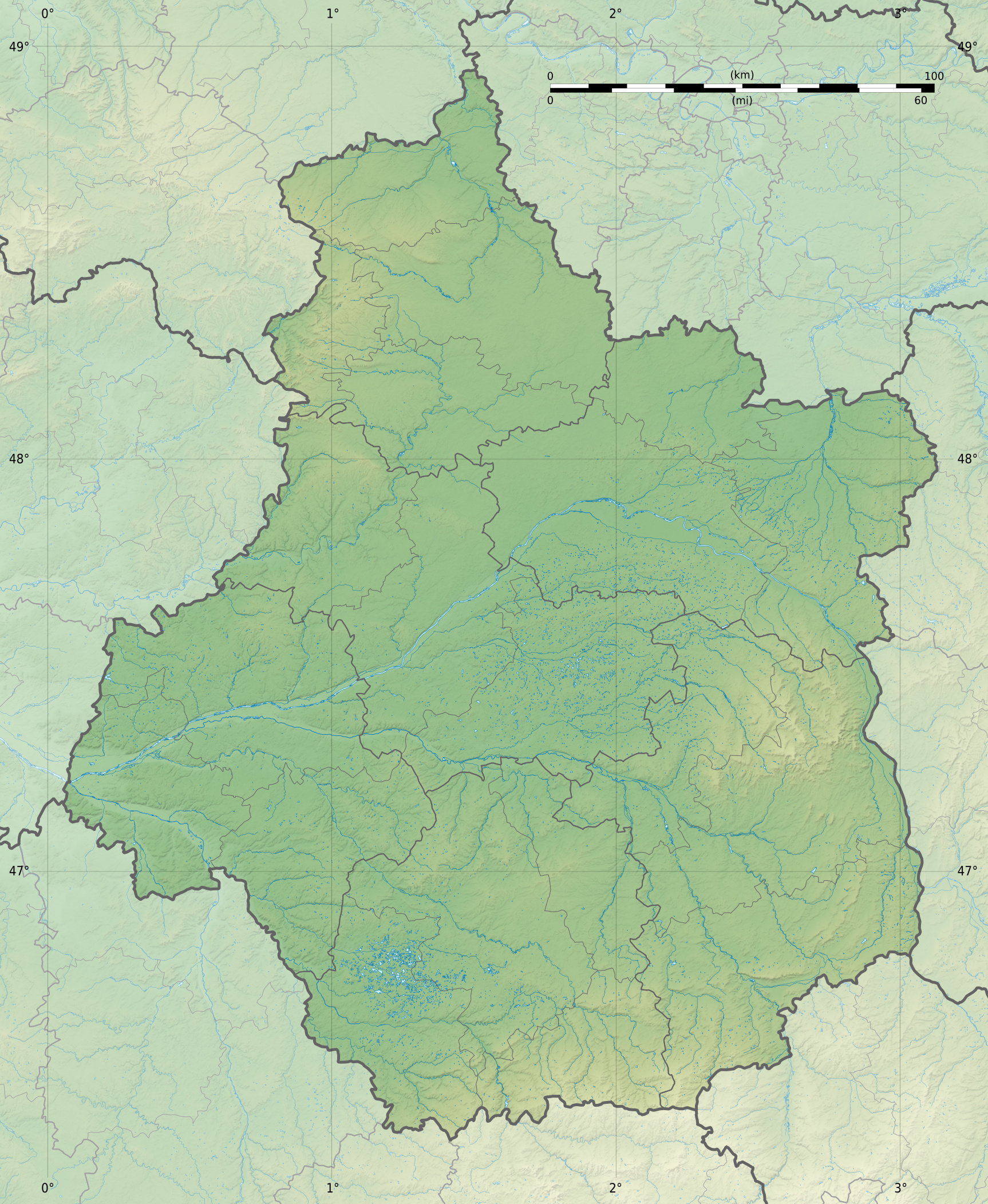
- Location within France Location within Centre-Val de Loire

Location
- Country: France

Physical characteristics
- Source
  - location: Limousin
- Mouth
  - location: Cher
  - coordinates: 47°13′1″N 2°0′42″E
- Length: 150.5 km (93.5 mi)
- Basin size: 2,274 km^{2} (878 sq mi)

Basin features
- Progression: Cher→ Loire→ Atlantic Ocean
- Tributaries
  - left: Théols

The Arnon (French pronunciation: [aʁnɔ̃]) is a 150.5 km (93.5 mi) long river in central France. It is a left tributary of the river Cher which is a tributary of the Loire. Its source is near the village of Préveranges, west of Montluçon. Its longest tributary is the Théols. The Arnon flows generally north, through the following departments and towns:

- Allier
- Cher: Culan, Lignières, Chârost
- Indre: Reuilly

The Arnon flows into the river Cher near Vierzon.
