= Communauté de communes en Terres Vives =

Terres Vives
- Former communauté de communes
- Country: France
- Region: Centre-Val de Loire
- Department: Cher
- No. of communes: {{{nbcomm}}}
- Established: 15 June 1994
- Disbanded: 2017
- Area: 245.02 km^{2} (94.60 sq mi)
- Population (1999): 12,518
  - Density: 51.090/km^{2} (132.32/sq mi)

The communauté de communes en Terres Vives was located in the Cher département of the Centre-Val de Loire region of France. It was created on 15 June 1994. It was merged into the new Communauté de communes Terres du Haut Berry in January 2017.

== Member communes ==
It comprised the following 11 communes:

1. Allogny
2. Fussy
3. Menetou-Salon
4. Pigny
5. Quantilly
6. Saint-Éloy-de-Gy
7. Saint-Georges-sur-Moulon
8. Saint-Martin-d'Auxigny
9. Saint-Palais
10. Vasselay
11. Vignoux-sous-les-Aix
