= Canton of Graçay =

Coordinates: 47°8′37″N 1°50′51″E

Graçay
- Former canton
- Interactive map of Graçay
- Country: France
- Region: Centre-Val de Loire
- Department: Cher
- No. of communes: {{{nbcomm}}}
- Disbanded: 2015
- Area: 134.95 km^{2} (52.10 sq mi)
- Population (2012): 3,570
  - Density: 26.5/km^{2} (68.5/sq mi)

The Canton of Graçay is a former canton situated in the Cher département and in the Centre region of France. It was disbanded following the French canton reorganisation which came into effect in March 2015. It consisted of 6 communes, which joined the canton of Vierzon-2 in 2015. It had 3,570 inhabitants (2012).

== Geography ==
A farming area in the valley of the river Fouzon, in the southwestern part of the arrondissement of Vierzon, centred on the town of Graçay. The altitude varied from 91m at Saint-Georges-sur-la-Prée to 176m at Genouilly, with an average altitude of 135m.

The canton comprised 6 communes:

- Dampierre-en-Graçay
- Genouilly
- Graçay
- Nohant-en-Graçay
- Saint-Georges-sur-la-Prée
- Saint-Outrille

== Population ==
Historical population Canton of Graçay
Year	1962	1968	1975	1982	1990	1999
Pop.	3,716	4,038	3,916	3,708	3,737	3,652
±%	—	+8.7%	−3.0%	−5.3%	+0.8%	−2.3%
From the year 1962 on: No double counting – residents of multiple communes (e.g. students and military personnel) are counted only once. Source: INSEE

== See also ==
- Arrondissements of the Cher department
- Cantons of the Cher department
- Communes of the Cher department
