= Communauté de communes des Vallées vertes du Cher Ouest =

Vallées vertes du Cher Ouest
- Former communauté de communes
- Country: France
- Region: Centre-Val de Loire
- Department: Cher
- No. of communes: {{{nbcomm}}}
- Established: 1994
- Disbanded: 2013
- Area: 146.70 km^{2} (56.64 sq mi)
- Population (1999): 4,451
  - Density: 30.34/km^{2} (78.58/sq mi)

The communauté de communes des Vallées vertes du Cher Ouest was located in the Cher département of the Centre-Val de Loire region of France. It was created in January 1994. It was merged into the new Communauté de communes Vierzon-Sologne-Berry in January 2013.

== Member communes ==
It comprised the following 7 communes:

- Dampierre-en-Graçay
- Genouilly
- Graçay
- Nohant-en-Graçay
- Saint-Georges-sur-la-Prée
- Saint-Hilaire-de-Court
- Saint-Outrille
