= Communauté de communes Vierzon Pays des cinq Rivières =

Vierzon Pays des cinq Rivières
- Former communauté de communes
- Country: France
- Region: Centre-Val de Loire
- Department: Cher
- No. of communes: {{{nbcomm}}}
- Established: 29 November 2002
- Disbanded: 2013
- Area: 113.74 km^{2} (43.92 sq mi)
- Population (2009): 29,065
  - Density: 255.54/km^{2} (661.84/sq mi)

The communauté de communes Vierzon Pays des cinq Rivières was located in the Cher département of the Centre region of France. It was created in November 2002. It was merged into the new Communauté de communes Vierzon-Sologne-Berry in January 2013.

It comprised the following 3 communes:

- Vierzon
- Méry-sur-Cher
- Thénioux
