= Valençay AOC =

Valençay (French pronunciation: [valɑ̃sɛ]) is an Appellation d'Origine Contrôlée (AOC) for wine in the upper Loire Valley wine region in France, located in the Touraine subregion. The vineyards of Valençay, a town known for its cheeses, have held AOC status since November 2003, making it the only place in France to have an appellation for both wine and cheese. It previously had VDQS status since 1970.

The vineyards lie on sloping hillsides on the left bank of the river Cher, in south-east Touraine. A range of grape varieties are grown here, but Sauvignon blanc is the main white variety, while Gamay is the main red variety.
