= Genouilly =

Genouilly may refer to the following places in France:

- Genouilly, Cher, a commune in the department of Cher
- Genouilly, Saône-et-Loire, a commune in the department of Saône-et-Loire
