= Saint-Outrille =

- Commune
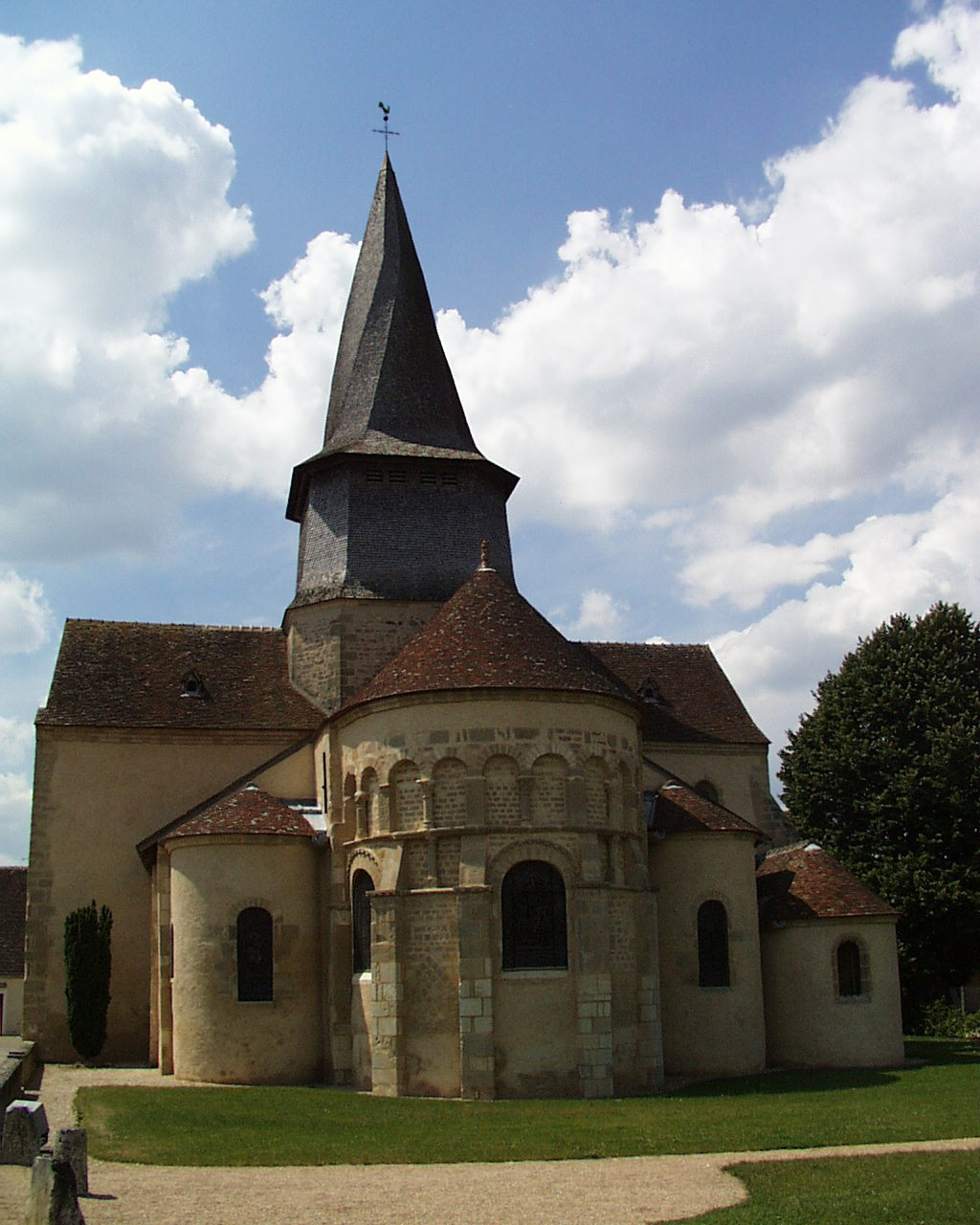
- The collegiate church of Saint-Austrégésile, in Saint-Outrille
- Location of Saint-Outrille
- Location within France Location within Centre-Val de Loire
- Coordinates: 47°08′41″N 1°50′28″E
- Country: France
- Region: Centre-Val de Loire
- Department: Cher
- Arrondissement: Vierzon
- Canton: Vierzon-2
- Intercommunality: CC Vierzon-Sologne-Berry

Government
  - Mayor (2020–2026): Alain Lebranchu
- Area^{1}: 12.48 km^{2} (4.82 sq mi)
- Elevation: 106 m (348 ft)
- Highest elevation: 151 m (495 ft)
- Lowest elevation: 97 m (318 ft)
- Population (2023): 214
  - Density: 17.1/km^{2} (44.4/sq mi)
- Time zone: UTC+01:00 (CET)
  - Summer (DST): UTC+02:00 (CEST)
- INSEE/Postal code: 18228 /18310
- ^{1} French Land Register data, which excludes lakes, ponds, glaciers > 1 km^{2} (0.386 sq mi or 247 acres) and river estuaries.

Saint-Outrille (French pronunciation: [sɛ̃.t‿utʁij]) is a commune in the Cher department in the Centre-Val de Loire region of France. It is named after the 7th century Saint Austregisilus.

== Geography ==
An area of farmland, forests and a village suburb on the left bank of the river Fouzon, which forms the boundary with the much larger village of Graçay, situated about 12 miles (19 km) southwest of Vierzon near the junction of the D68 with the D83 and D922 roads. The commune borders the department of Indre.

== Population ==
Historical population
Year	Pop.	±% p.a.
1968	284	—
1975	294	+0.50%
1982	288	−0.29%
1990	259	−1.32%
1999	203	−2.67%
2007	214	+0.66%
2012	209	−0.47%
2017	220	+1.03%
2023	214	−0.46%
Source: INSEE

== Sights ==
- The church of St. Austrégesile, dating from the twelfth century.

== See also ==
- Communes of the Cher department
