= Valençay =

- Commune
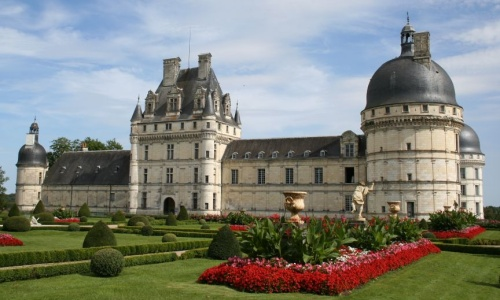
- Castle of Valençay

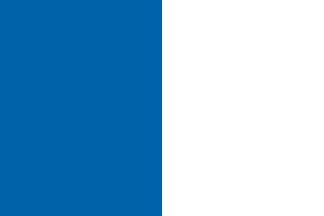
- Flag Coat of arms
- Location of Valençay
- Location within France Location within Centre-Val de Loire
- Coordinates: 47°09′41″N 1°34′01″E
- Country: France
- Region: Centre-Val de Loire
- Department: Indre
- Arrondissement: Châteauroux
- Canton: Valençay

Government
  - Mayor (2020–2026): Claude Doucet
- Area^{1}: 41.59 km^{2} (16.06 sq mi)
- Elevation: 145 m (476 ft)
- Highest elevation: 154 m (505 ft)
- Lowest elevation: 91 m (299 ft)
- Population (2023): 2,228
  - Density: 53.57/km^{2} (138.7/sq mi)
- Time zone: UTC+01:00 (CET)
  - Summer (DST): UTC+02:00 (CEST)
- INSEE/Postal code: 36228 /36600
- ^{1} French Land Register data, which excludes lakes, ponds, glaciers > 1 km^{2} (0.386 sq mi or 247 acres) and river estuaries.

Valençay (French pronunciation: [valɑ̃sɛ]) is a commune in the Indre department in the administrative region of Centre-Val de Loire, France. It is known for the 16th-17th century Château de Valençay and for Valençay cheese.

== Geography ==
Valençay sits at the end of a plateau, on a hillside overlooking the river Nahon, a tributary of the Fouzon (Loire basin). Valençay is part of the former province Berry.

== History ==
The commune was formed by the union of three settlements: the "Bourg-de-l'Eglise", the "Bas-Bourg" and what is called the "old quarter."

Although not in the Loire Valley, the chateau shows similarities, by virtue of the date of its construction and its dimensions, with for instance Château de Chambord.

A 12th-century castle existed on this site, was demolished and construction of its replacement began in 1520, albeit slowly. The chateau was born in the 16th and 17th centuries by the Estampes family. Louis of Estampes, governor and baillif of Blois, undertook the building of the large round tower at the end of the entrance wing. He died in 1530, leaving the tower unfinished. The tower rises above the entry.

Work on Valençay began again about 1540 under Jacques of Estampes, lord of the manor. He had married a Grassement with a financier in the family. The lord wanted a residence worthy of his new fortune. Jacques covered the dome of the tower with an imperial design.

Valençay was rebuilt multiple times.

At the end of the 16th century, Jean of Estampes built a gatehouse in the shape of a keep, confined to four turrets. It connects to the spans built by Jacques. Jean built the building and the tower on the left of the central house. In the 17th century, Dominique of Estampes finished the wing in the same style as the first half. The castle then formed a quadrilateral enclosed by a second wing and, at the bottom of the court, by arcades.

Finance remained mixed with Valençay's history: among its successive owners include farmers. Valençay was sold in 1747 to the general farmer Legendre de Villemorien. He demolished a part of the buildings, preserving only the entry and the first wing. Also Scottish banker John Law purchased it.

In 1803 the castle was purchased by diplomat Charles Maurice de Talleyrand..

On 6 May 1941, Georges Bégué, the first SOE agent from England, was parachuted into a field near Valençay. Fifty years later, the Valençay SOE Memorial, originally known as the "Spirit of Partnership", was dedicated in honour of the 104 members of SOE's F Section who died for the liberation of France. At the end of the Second World War, Valençay suffered considerable damage in August 1944 when an SS division burnt down 42 buildings and murdered eight innocent people.

== Population ==
Historical population

Year	Pop.	±% p.a.
1793	2,299	—
1800	2,300	+0.01%
1806	2,519	+1.53%
1821	2,712	+0.49%
1831	3,095	+1.33%
1836	3,289	+1.22%
1841	3,229	−0.37%
1846	3,425	+1.19%
1851	3,627	+1.15%
1856	3,476	−0.85%
1861	3,587	+0.63%
1866	3,653	+0.37%
1872	3,547	−0.49%
1876	3,517	−0.21%
1881	3,554	+0.21%
1886	3,547	−0.04%
1891	3,621	+0.41%
1896	3,431	−1.07%
1901	3,346	−0.50%

Year	Pop.	±% p.a.
1906	3,411	+0.39%
1911	3,343	−0.40%
1921	2,976	−1.16%
1926	2,874	−0.70%
1931	2,789	−0.60%
1936	2,762	−0.19%
1946	2,739	−0.08%
1954	2,679	−0.28%
1962	2,732	+0.25%
1968	2,754	+0.13%
1975	2,952	+1.00%
1982	2,947	−0.02%
1990	2,912	−0.15%
1999	2,736	−0.69%
2007	2,665	−0.33%
2012	2,577	−0.67%
2017	2,367	−1.69%
2023	2,228	−1.00%

Source: EHESS and INSEE (1968–2023)

== Economy ==
The town is known for its pyramid-shaped Valençay cheese made from raw goats' milk. The town's twin city is Cesano Maderno in Lombardy, Italy

== See also ==
- Berry
- Saint-Benoît-du-Sault
- French wine
- Communes of the Indre department
- Pearl Witherington, Resistance leader during World War II
