= Canton of Vierzon-1 =

Canton in Cher, Centre-Val de Loire, France

Coordinates: 47.24°N 2.06°E

Vierzon-1
- Canton
- Interactive map of Vierzon-1
- Country: France
- Region: Centre-Val de Loire
- Department: Cher
- No. of communes: {{{nbcomm}}}
- Population (2023): 14,736
- INSEE code: 18 18

The Canton of Vierzon-1 is a canton situated in the Cher département and in the Centre-Val de Loire region of France. It covers the northern part of the commune of Vierzon.

== Geography ==
An urban and light industrial area at the confluence of the Yèvre and Cher rivers, in the centre of the arrondissement of Vierzon. The altitude varies from 94m to 182m, with an average altitude of 122m.

== See also ==
- Arrondissements of the Cher department
- Cantons of the Cher department
- Communes of the Cher department
