= Damien Robin =

French footballer (born 1989)

Personal information
- Full name: Damien Robin
- Date of birth: 5 June 1989 (age 37)
- Place of birth: Vierzon, France
- Height: 1.80 m (5 ft 11 in)
- Position: Defender

Team information
- Current team: Bourges 18

Senior career*
Years	Team	Apps	(Gls)
2009–2012	Clermont Foot	3	(0)
2013–	Bourges 18	86	(1)
- * Club domestic league appearances and goals as of 00:12, 10 February 2018 (UTC)

Damien Robin (born 5 June 1989) is a French professional footballer who plays for Bourges 18.

He made his professional debut for Clermont Foot on 23 October 2009 in a Ligue 2 match against Vannes OC.
