= Communauté de communes Vierzon-Sologne-Berry =

Federation of municipalities in France

Vierzon-Sologne-Berry
- Communauté de communes
- Interactive map of Vierzon-Sologne-Berry
- Coordinates: 47°14′N 02°04′E
- Country: France
- Region: Centre-Val de Loire
- Department: Cher
- No. of communes: {{{nbcomm}}}
- Established: 2020
- Area: 508.2 km^{2} (196.2 sq mi)
- Population (2019): 38,681
  - Density: 76.11/km^{2} (197.1/sq mi)
- Website: www.cc-vierzon.fr

The Communauté de communes Vierzon-Sologne-Berry (before July 2020: Communauté de communes Vierzon-Sologne-Berry et Villages de la Forêt) is a communauté de communes, an intercommunal structure, in the Cher department, in the Centre-Val de Loire region, central France. It was created in January 2020 by the merger of the former communautés de communes Vierzon-Sologne-Berry and les Villages de la Forêt. The Communauté de communes Vierzon-Sologne-Berry had been created in January 2013 by the merger of the former communautés de communes Vierzon Pays des cinq Rivières and Vallées vertes du Cher Ouest.Its area is 508.2 km^{2}, and its population was 38,681 in 2019. Its seat is in Vierzon. In January 2021 Nançay left the communauté de communes and joined the communauté de communes Sauldre et Sologne.

== Communes ==
The communauté de communes consists of the following 16 communes:

1. Dampierre-en-Graçay
2. Foëcy
3. Genouilly
4. Graçay
5. Massay
6. Méry-sur-Cher
7. Neuvy-sur-Barangeon
8. Nohant-en-Graçay
9. Saint-Georges-sur-la-Prée
10. Saint-Hilaire-de-Court
11. Saint-Laurent
12. Saint-Outrille
13. Thénioux
14. Vierzon
15. Vignoux-sur-Barangeon
16. Vouzeron
