= Méry-sur-Cher =

- Commune
- Coat of arms
- Location of Méry-sur-Cher
- Location within France Location within Centre-Val de Loire
- Coordinates: 47°14′49″N 1°59′21″E
- Country: France
- Region: Centre-Val de Loire
- Department: Cher
- Arrondissement: Vierzon
- Canton: Vierzon-2
- Intercommunality: CC Vierzon-Sologne-Berry

Government
  - Mayor (2020–2026): Rached Ait-Slimane
- Area^{1}: 20.91 km^{2} (8.07 sq mi)
- Elevation: 140 m (460 ft)
- Highest elevation: 158 m (518 ft)
- Lowest elevation: 93 m (305 ft)
- Population (2023): 690
  - Density: 33/km^{2} (85/sq mi)
- Time zone: UTC+01:00 (CET)
  - Summer (DST): UTC+02:00 (CEST)
- INSEE/Postal code: 18150 /18100
- ^{1} French Land Register data, which excludes lakes, ponds, glaciers > 1 km^{2} (0.386 sq mi or 247 acres) and river estuaries.

Méry-sur-Cher (French pronunciation: [meʁi syʁ ʃɛʁ]) is a commune in the Cher department in the Centre-Val de Loire region of France.

== Geography ==
A village of farming and forestry situated by the banks of the Cher some 6 miles (9.7 km) northwest of Vierzon, at the junction of the N76 and the D211 roads. The now disused Canal de Berry passes through the south of the commune.

== Population ==
Historical population
Year	Pop.	±% p.a.
1968	515	—
1975	534	+0.52%
1982	555	+0.55%
1990	601	+1.00%
1999	625	+0.44%
2007	680	+1.06%
2012	689	+0.26%
2017	678	−0.32%
2023	690	+0.29%
Source: INSEE

== Notable residents ==
- Cyprian Godebski (1835–1909), artist.

== See also ==
- Communes of the Cher department
