= Vouzeron =

- Commune
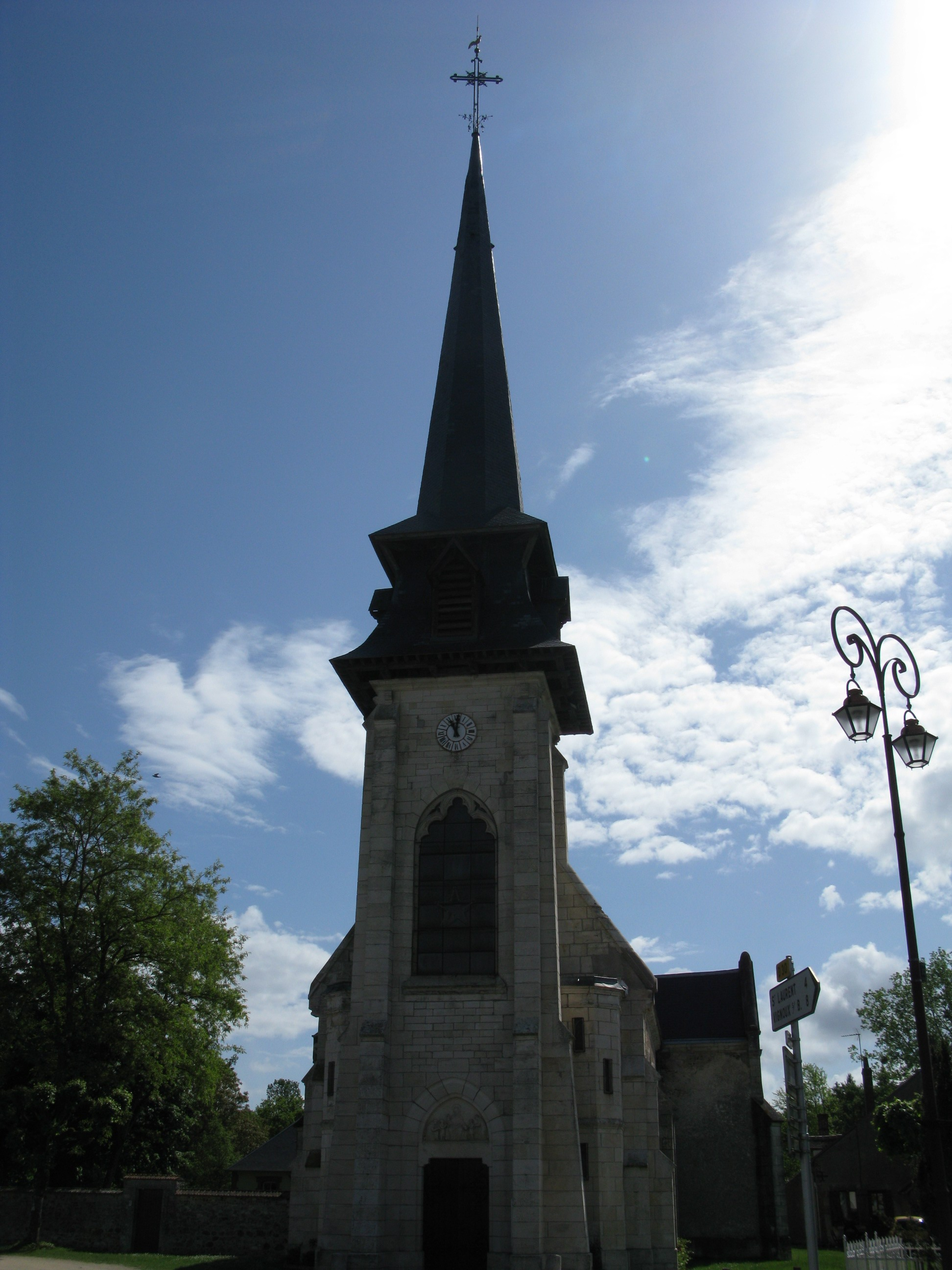
- Church
- Location of Vouzeron
- Location within France Location within Centre-Val de Loire
- Coordinates: 47°15′40″N 2°13′22″E
- Country: France
- Region: Centre-Val de Loire
- Department: Cher
- Arrondissement: Vierzon
- Canton: Saint-Martin-d'Auxigny
- Intercommunality: CC Vierzon-Sologne-Berry

Government
  - Mayor (2020–2026): Zitony Harket
- Area^{1}: 52.63 km^{2} (20.32 sq mi)
- Elevation: 226 m (741 ft)
- Highest elevation: 190 m (620 ft)
- Lowest elevation: 118 m (387 ft)
- Population (2023): 578
  - Density: 11.0/km^{2} (28.4/sq mi)
- Time zone: UTC+01:00 (CET)
  - Summer (DST): UTC+02:00 (CEST)
- INSEE/Postal code: 18290 /18330
- ^{1} French Land Register data, which excludes lakes, ponds, glaciers > 1 km^{2} (0.386 sq mi or 247 acres) and river estuaries.

Vouzeron (French pronunciation: [vuzʁɔ̃]) is a commune in the Cher department in central France.

== Population ==
Historical population
Year	Pop.	±% p.a.
1968	414	—
1975	405	−0.31%
1982	394	−0.39%
1990	441	+1.42%
1999	445	+0.10%
2007	556	+2.82%
2012	549	−0.25%
2017	566	+0.61%
2023	578	+0.35%
Source: INSEE

== See also ==
- Communes of the Cher department
