= Hôtel de Ville, Vierzon =

Town hall in Vierzon, France

Hôtel de Ville
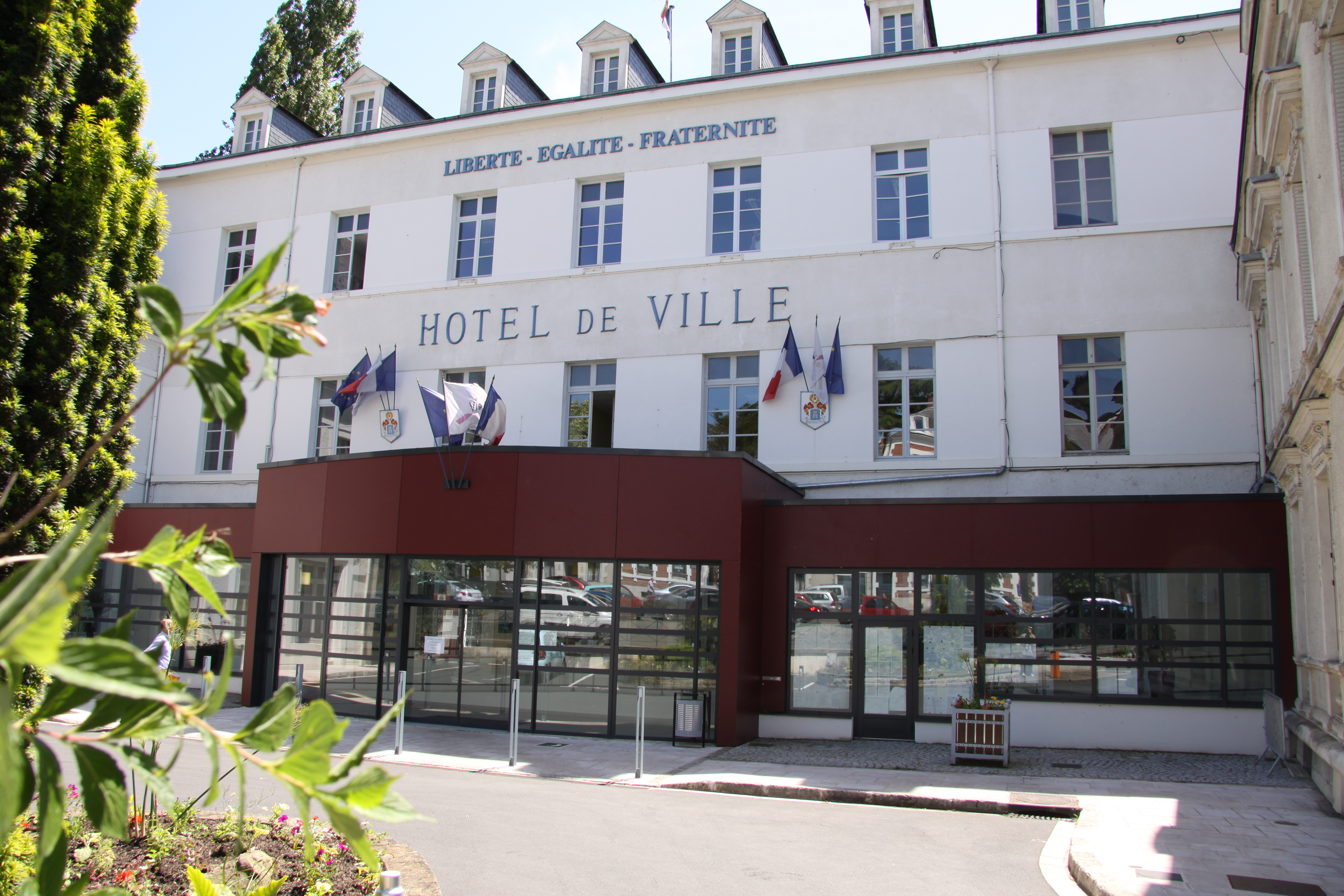
- The main frontage of the Hôtel de Ville in June 2014
- Interactive map of the Hôtel de Ville area

General information
- Type: City hall
- Architectural style: Neoclassical style
- Location: Vierzon, France
- Coordinates: 47.2213°N 2.0697°E
- Completed: 1772

Design and construction
- Architect: Sieur de Montrachet

The Hôtel de Ville (French pronunciation: [otɛl də vil], City Hall) is a municipal building in Vierzon, Cher, in central France, standing on Place de l'Hôtel de Ville.

== History ==
In July 1770, after an improvement in the town's financial position, the aldermen decided to commission a new town hall, which would also serve as a courthouse. The site they selected was occupied by the monks' refectory and dormitory of the Abbey of Saint-Pierre, which had been erected by Benedictine monks on the north bank of the River Yèvre in the year 923. By the second half of the 18th century, the abbey was in a dilapidated condition and to facilitate construction of the town hall, various abbey buildings were demolished: these included the stables, part of a college used by the monks, the Chapel of Saint-Vincent and part of the perimeter wall, as well as several towers which were close to collapse. The new building was designed by Sieur de Montrachet in the neoclassical style, built by Charles Cissoigne in brick with a cement render finish at a cost of 5,239 livres and was officially opened by the mayor, Sieur Corbin, in December 1772.

The building was laid out as a single rectangular block. The design involved a main frontage of some seven bays facing towards what is now Rue Armand Brunet. There were a series of doorways on the ground floor, a series of casement windows on the first floor and a hipped roof punctuated by a series of dormer windows above. During the French Revolution, the abbey was seized by the state and the monks driven out. What remained of the abbey was then demolished. A new building, which projected forward on the east side of the town hall, was subsequently erected on the site of the old chapter house of the abbey. This wing subsequently accommodated the local post office and later the Salle des Actes (assembly hall).

On 15 August 1824, a large ball was held in the building, hosting 120 families, to celebrate the King's Feast Day, an event instituted by Louis XVIII. Meanwhile, the directors of the local savings bank, founded by Frédéric Gaëtan de La Rochefoucauld, Marquis of Liancourt in 1838, moved into an adjacent building, which projected forward on the west side of the town hall, in 1882. This building was demolished in 1890 and replaced by a new banking hall, designed in purest neoclassical style, in 1892.

During the liberation of the town on the evening of 4 September 1944, during the Second World War, the French Forces of the Interior seized the town hall. A large crowd assembled on the following day and listened to a speech by the head of the liberation committee, Léo Mérigot, in front of the town hall, and a plaque was subsequently installed in the building to commemorate the event.

A new foyer, with a glass doorway and dark red cladding, was added at ground floor level to the front of the building in around 2010.
