= Thénioux =

- Commune
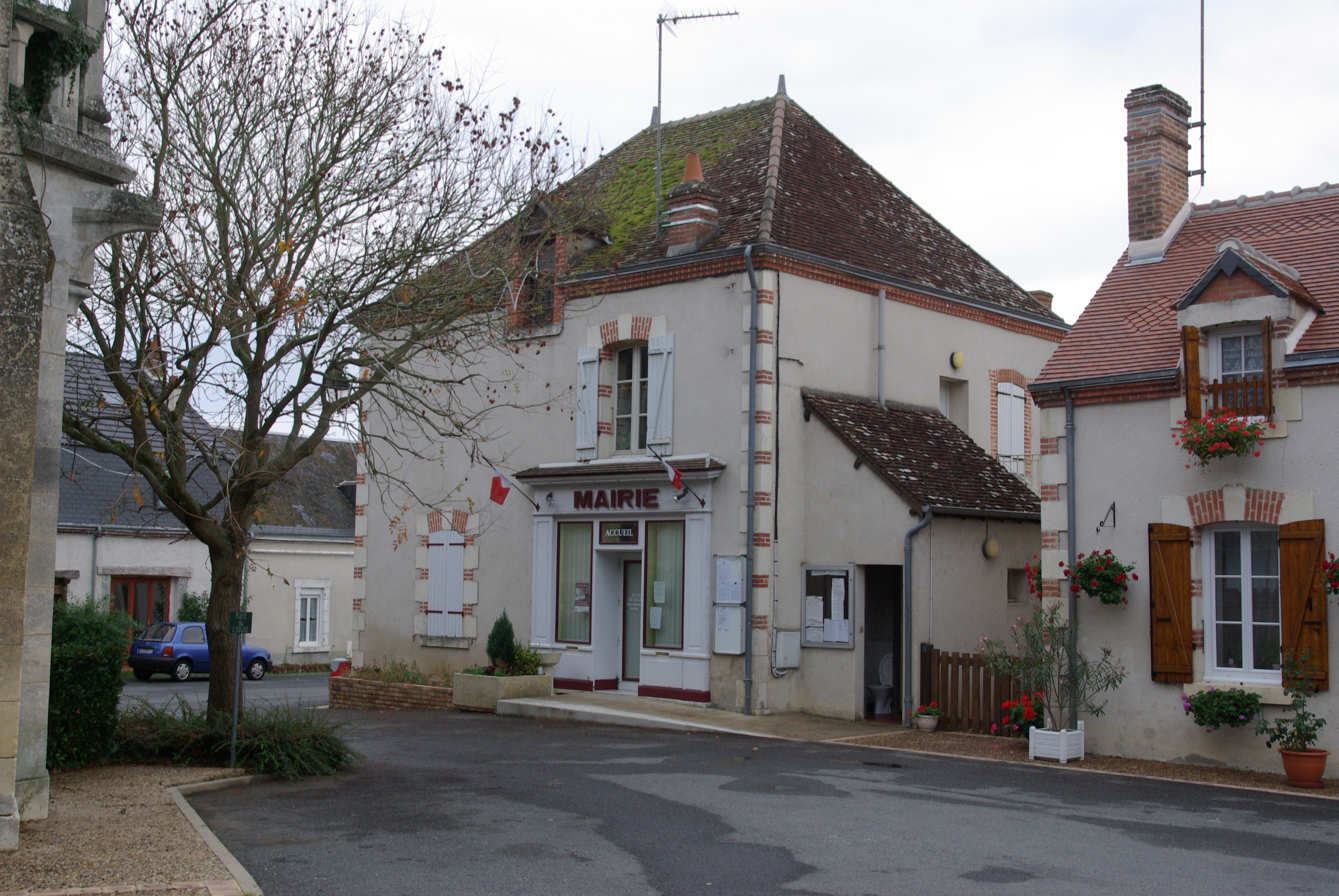
- Town hall
- Location of Thénioux
- Location within France Location within Centre-Val de Loire
- Coordinates: 47°15′26″N 1°55′56″E
- Country: France
- Region: Centre-Val de Loire
- Department: Cher
- Arrondissement: Vierzon
- Canton: Vierzon-2
- Intercommunality: CC Vierzon-Sologne-Berry

Government
  - Mayor (2020–2026): Delphine Piétu
- Area^{1}: 18.33 km^{2} (7.08 sq mi)
- Elevation: 100 m (330 ft)
- Highest elevation: 158 m (518 ft)
- Lowest elevation: 87 m (285 ft)
- Population (2023): 667
  - Density: 36.4/km^{2} (94.2/sq mi)
- Time zone: UTC+01:00 (CET)
  - Summer (DST): UTC+02:00 (CEST)
- INSEE/Postal code: 18263 /18100
- ^{1} French Land Register data, which excludes lakes, ponds, glaciers > 1 km^{2} (0.386 sq mi or 247 acres) and river estuaries.

Thénioux (French pronunciation: [tenju]) is a commune in the Cher department in the Centre-Val de Loire region of France.

== Geography ==
An area of farming and forestry comprising the village and two hamlets situated on the banks of the Cher, about 8 miles (13 km) northwest of Vierzon, at the junction of the N976 and the D19 roads. The now disused Canal de Berry passes through the middle of the commune, which is also served by the TER railway.

== Population ==
Historical population
| Year | Pop. | ±% p.a. |
|---|---|---|
| 1968 | 507 | — |
| 1975 | 529 | +0.61% |
| 1982 | 584 | +1.42% |
| 1990 | 600 | +0.34% |
| 1999 | 602 | +0.04% |
| 2007 | 589 | −0.27% |
| 2012 | 687 | +3.13% |
| 2017 | 664 | −0.68% |
| 2023 | 667 | +0.08% |
Source: INSEE

== Sights ==
- The church, dating from the fifteenth century.
- The World War II memorial.

== See also ==
- Communes of the Cher department
