= Achères =

Achères is the name or part of the name of several communes in France:

- Achères, Cher, in the Cher département
- Achères, Yvelines
- Achères-la-Forêt, in the Seine-et-Marne département
