= Canton of Saint-Martin-d'Auxigny =

Coordinates: 47°12′16″N 2°25′3″E

Saint-Martin-d'Auxigny
- Canton
- Interactive map of Saint-Martin-d'Auxigny
- Country: France
- Region: Centre-Val de Loire
- Department: Cher
- No. of communes: {{{nbcomm}}}
- Area: 373.99 km^{2} (144.40 sq mi)
- Population (2023): 17,308
  - Density: 46.279/km^{2} (119.86/sq mi)
- INSEE code: 18 15

The Canton of Saint-Martin-d'Auxigny is a canton situated in the Cher département and in the Centre-Val de Loire region of France.

== Geography ==
An area of winegrowing, farming and forestry in the northern part of the arrondissement of Bourges centred on the town of Saint-Martin-d'Auxigny. The altitude varies from 133m at Fussy to 312m at Menetou-Salon, with an average altitude of 183m.

== Composition ==
At the French canton reorganisation which came into effect in March 2015, the canton was expanded from 11 to 15 communes:

- Achères
- Allogny
- Fussy
- Menetou-Salon
- Pigny
- Quantilly
- Saint-Éloy-de-Gy
- Saint-Georges-sur-Moulon
- Saint-Laurent
- Saint-Martin-d'Auxigny
- Saint-Palais
- Vasselay
- Vignoux-sous-les-Aix
- Vignoux-sur-Barangeon
- Vouzeron

== Population ==
Historical population
Year	Pop.	±% p.a.
2013	16,698	—
2018	17,118	+0.50%
2020	17,333	+0.63%
Source: INSEE

== See also ==
- Arrondissements of the Cher department
- Cantons of the Cher department
- Communes of the Cher department
