= Saint-Hilaire-de-Court =

- Commune
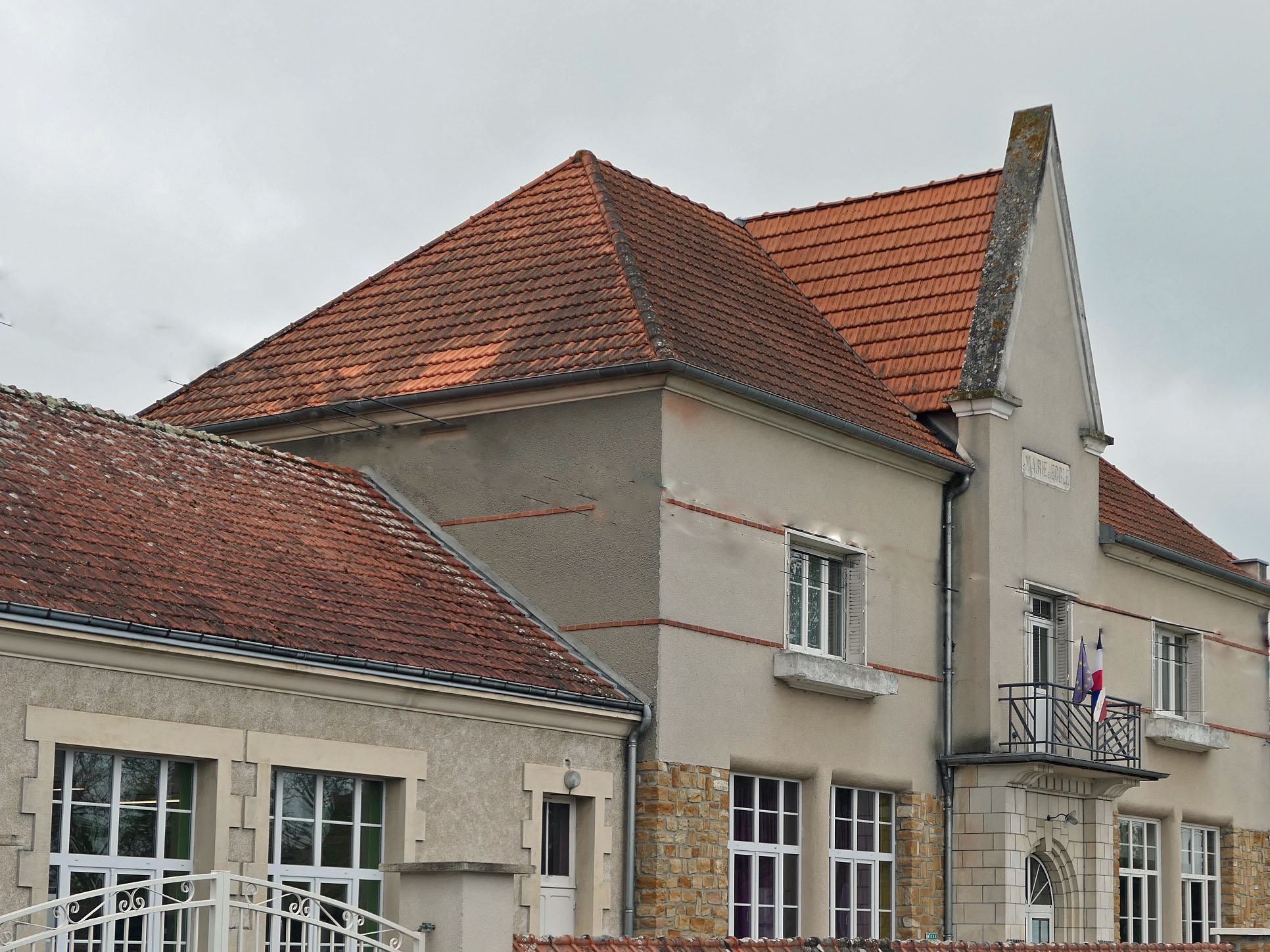
- Town hall
- Location of Saint-Hilaire-de-Court
- Location within France Location within Centre-Val de Loire
- Coordinates: 47°12′27″N 2°01′25″E
- Country: France
- Region: Centre-Val de Loire
- Department: Cher
- Arrondissement: Vierzon
- Canton: Vierzon-2
- Intercommunality: CC Vierzon-Sologne-Berry

Government
  - Mayor (2020–2026): Stéphane Rousseau
- Area^{1}: 11.75 km^{2} (4.54 sq mi)
- Elevation: 100 m (330 ft)
- Highest elevation: 146 m (479 ft)
- Lowest elevation: 93 m (305 ft)
- Population (2023): 594
  - Density: 50.6/km^{2} (131/sq mi)
- Time zone: UTC+01:00 (CET)
  - Summer (DST): UTC+02:00 (CEST)
- INSEE/Postal code: 18214 /18100
- ^{1} French Land Register data, which excludes lakes, ponds, glaciers > 1 km^{2} (0.386 sq mi or 247 acres) and river estuaries.

Saint-Hilaire-de-Court (French pronunciation: [sɛ̃.t‿ilɛʁ də kuʁ]) is a commune in the Cher department in the Centre-Val de Loire region of France.

== Geography ==
An area of forestry and farming comprising the village and two hamlets situated in the Arnon river valley, about 2 miles (3.2 km) southwest of Vierzon at the junction of the D163, D90 and D320 roads. The A20 autoroute passes through the commune’s territory.

== Population ==
Historical population
Year	Pop.	±% p.a.
1968	265	—
1975	308	+2.17%
1982	668	+11.69%
1990	794	+2.18%
1999	735	−0.85%
2007	734	−0.02%
2012	656	−2.22%
2017	595	−1.93%
2023	594	−0.03%
Source: INSEE

== Sights ==
- The chapel, dating from the fifteenth century.
- The chateau of La Beuvrière, dating from the sixteenth century.

== See also ==
- Communes of the Cher department
