= Valençay cheese =

French goat cheese

Valençay
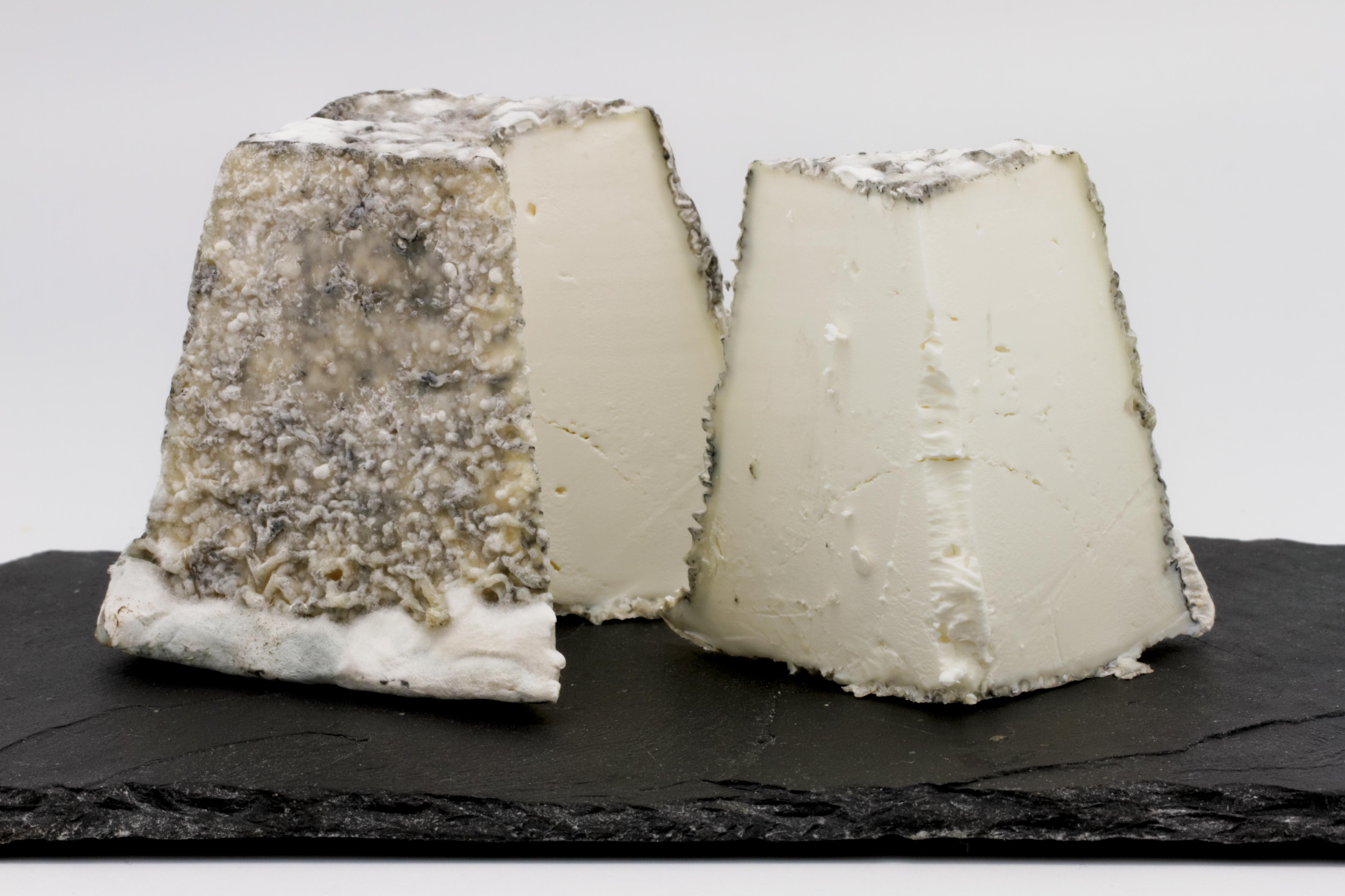
- Country of origin: France
- Region, town: Berry
- Source of milk: Goats
- Pasteurised: No
- Texture: Soft cheese with flavoured rind
- Aging time: Around 3 weeks
- Certification: French AOC 1998
- Named after: Valençay

Valençay (French pronunciation: [valɑ̃sɛ]) is a cheese made in the historic province of Berry in central France. Its name is derived from the town of Valençay in the Indre department.

Distinctive in its truncated pyramidal shape, Valençay is an unpasteurised goat-milk cheese weighing 200–250 grams (7.1–8.8 oz) and around 7 cm (2.8 in) in height. Its rustic blue-grey colour is made by the natural moulds that form its rind, then darkened with a dusting of charcoal. The young cheese has a fresh, citric taste, with age giving it a nutty taste characteristic of goat cheeses.

The cheese achieved AOC status in 1998 and in 2003, with AOC status for Valençay wine, it became the first region to achieve AOC status for both its cheese and its wine.

== History ==
The historic province of Berry has been the home to many cheeses over the centuries, and produces Selles-sur-Cher, Crottin de Chavignol and Pouligny-Saint-Pierre amongst others.

One apocryphal tale has it that Napoleon, having returned from his disastrous campaigns in Egypt, stopped at the castle at Valençay. The local pyramidal cheese apparently aroused unpleasant memories as he allegedly then cut the top off in fury with his sword, leaving the shape that survives to the present day.

== Manufacture ==
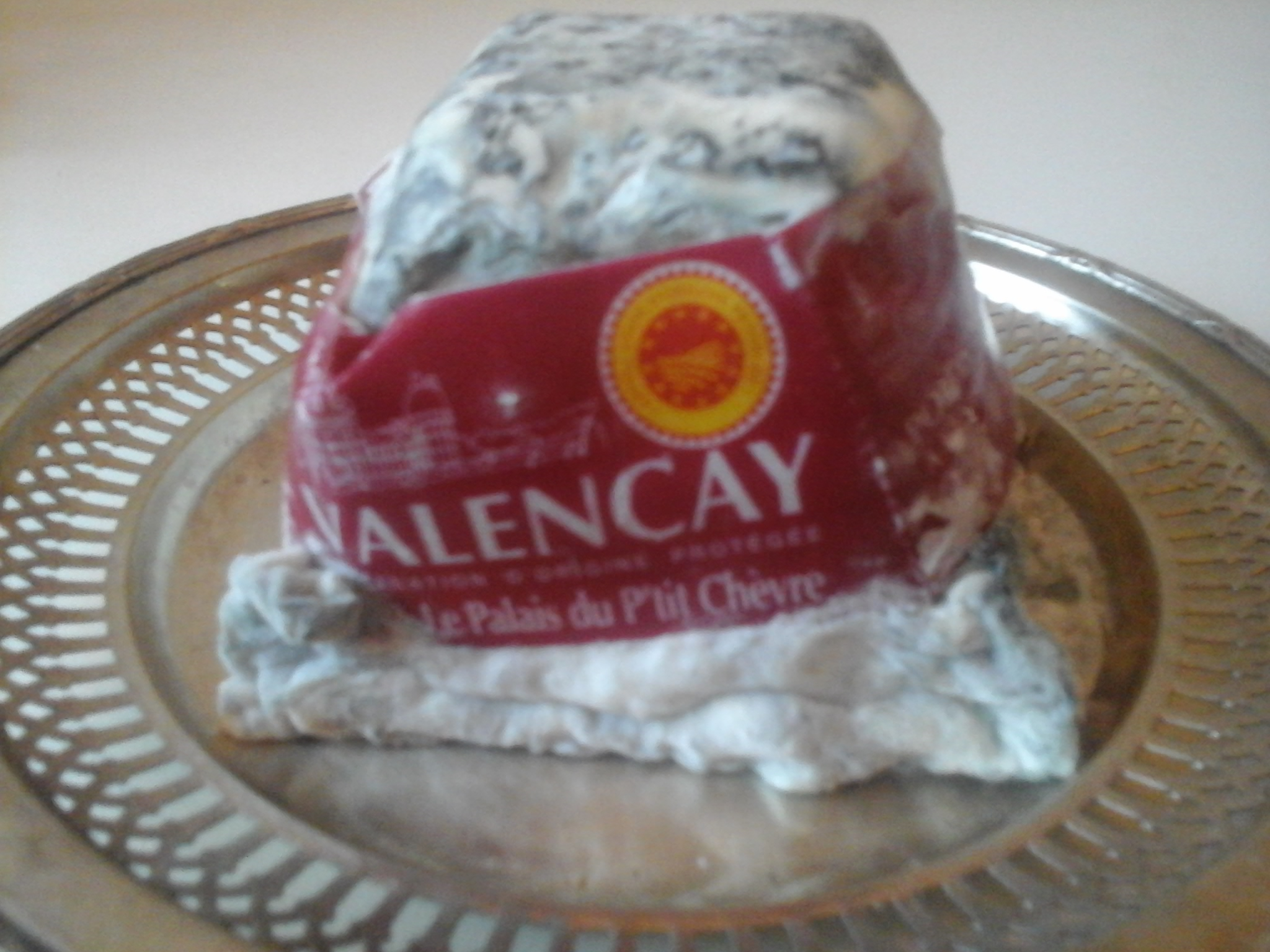
Valençay cheese from the farm.

The curd is drained and placed in a mould. After being removed, it is covered with charcoal dust and left to ripen in a humid, ventilated room. Ripening lasts for three weeks during which time the characteristic external mould forms and the central pate—initially crumbly—softens.

The cheese is available between March and December, with peak manufacture between April and August.

== See also ==
- List of goat milk cheeses
