= Zulma Carraud =

French author

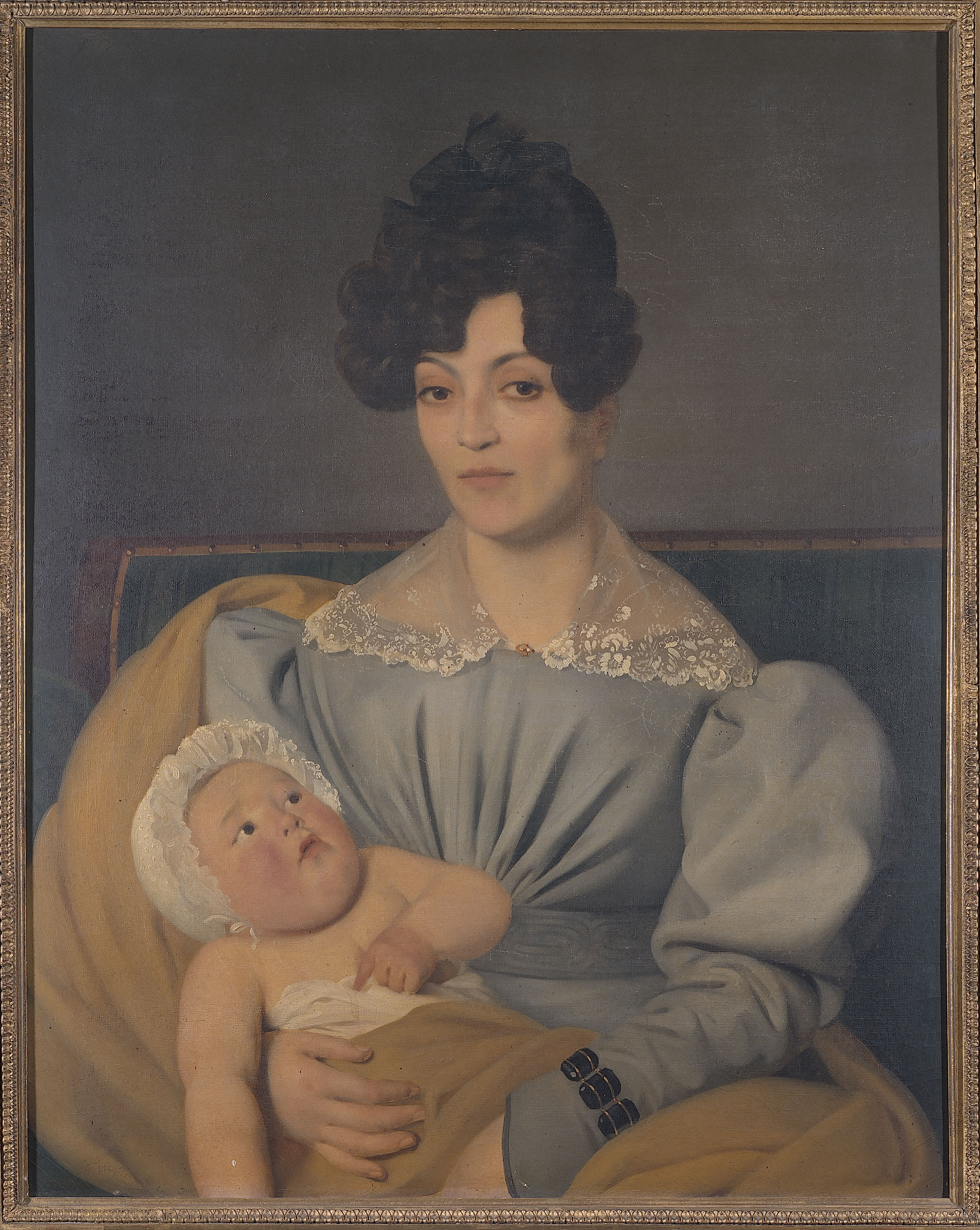
- Portrait of Zulma Carraud and her son Ivan
- Born: Estelle Zulma Tourangin-Courant; 24 March 1796; Issoudun, France
- Died: 24 April 1889 (aged 93); Paris, France
- Resting place: Nohant-en-Graçay, France
- Occupation: Author
- Writing career
- Notable works: La Petite Jeanne ou le devoir Maurice ou le travail

Zulma Carraud (24 March 1796 – 24 April 1889) was a French writer. She is best known for her children's books and textbooks particularly La Petite Jeanne ou le devoir and Maurice ou le travail.

== Early and family life ==
Carraud was born on 24 March 1796 in Issoudun. She attended a boarding school where she met Laure de Balzac and through her, Honoré de Balzac, both of whom she remained lifelong friends with. She married her second cousin François Michel Carraud, who was 15 years her senior, in 1816. They had two children, Ivan and Yorick. They moved to Nohant to live with her brother due to financial troubles in the 1850s. Carraud died in Paris on 24 April 1889 at the age of 93.

== Career ==
After moving to Nohant, Carraud volunteered as a country doctor and as a teacher at a rural school from 1852 until 1868. She began writing books and textbooks for children in rural areas after struggling to get proper books while she was a teacher. She wrote books aimed specifically at children from peasant families and their parents and was one of the first children's authors to focus on main characters that were not from noble, bourgeois or working-class families.

Her first book, La Petite Jeanne ou le devoir was published in 1852 and was aimed at girls. Her second book, aimed at boys, was called Maurice ou le travail and was published in 1853. Both were sold across France and were endorsed by the Minister of Public Instruction and Beaux-Arts and by the Archbishop of Paris. Between 1864 and 1920, both books sold over 400,000 copies and were used in many schools to teach children from rural backgrounds both reading and middle-class values with clearly defined gender roles.
