= Graçay =

- Commune
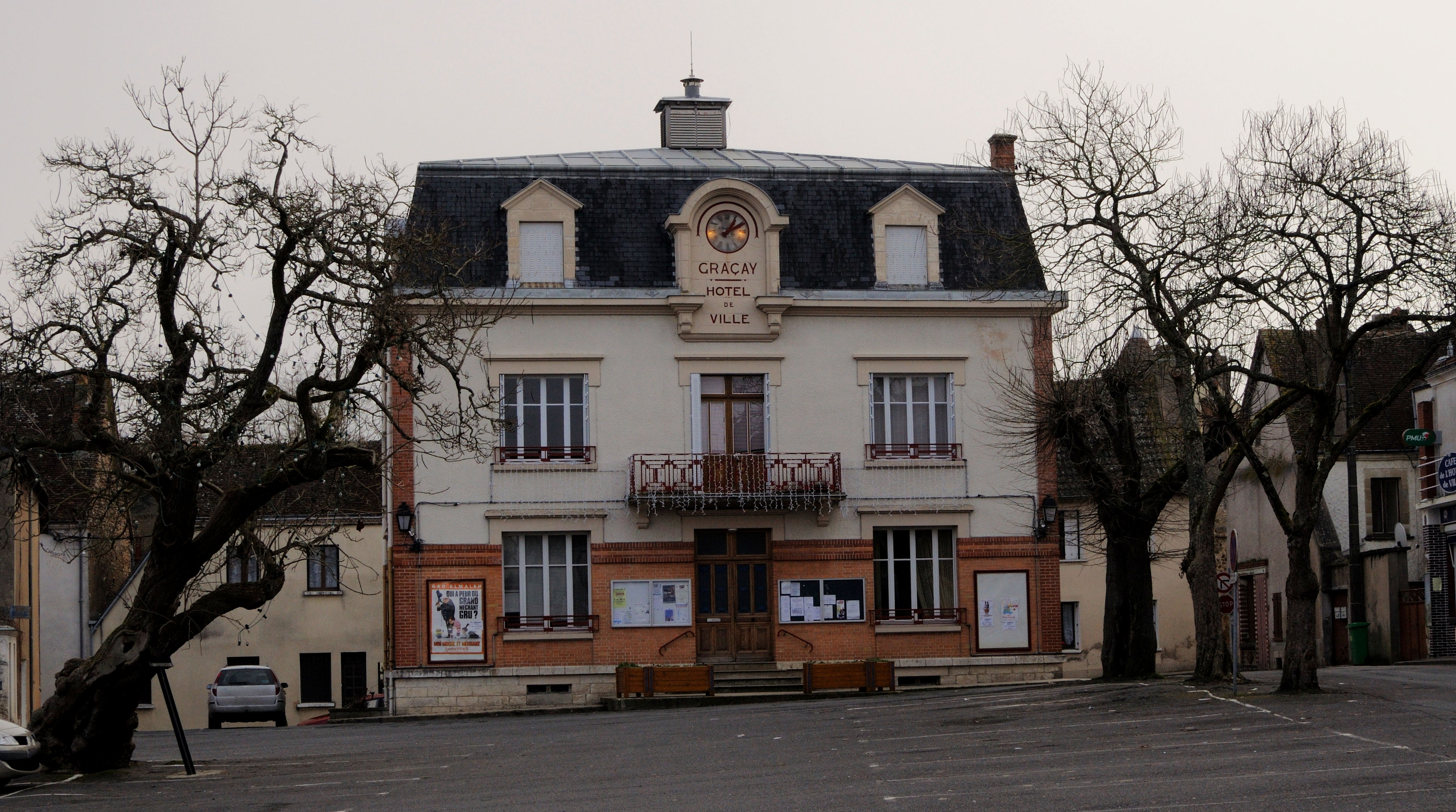
- Town hall

- Coat of arms
- Location of Graçay
- Location within France Location within Centre-Val de Loire
- Coordinates: 47°08′37″N 1°50′51″E
- Country: France
- Region: Centre-Val de Loire
- Department: Cher
- Arrondissement: Vierzon
- Canton: Vierzon-2
- Intercommunality: CC Vierzon-Sologne-Berry

Government
  - Mayor (2022–2026): Michel Archambault
- Area^{1}: 31.82 km^{2} (12.29 sq mi)
- Elevation: 111 m (364 ft)
- Highest elevation: 164 m (538 ft)
- Lowest elevation: 97 m (318 ft)
- Population (2023): 1,234
  - Density: 38.78/km^{2} (100.4/sq mi)
- Time zone: UTC+01:00 (CET)
  - Summer (DST): UTC+02:00 (CEST)
- INSEE/Postal code: 18103 /18310
- ^{1} French Land Register data, which excludes lakes, ponds, glaciers > 1 km^{2} (0.386 sq mi or 247 acres) and river estuaries.

Graçay (French pronunciation: [ɡʁasɛ]) is a commune in the Cher department in the Centre-Val de Loire region of France.

== Geography ==
It is a farming area comprising the small town and several hamlets, on the right bank of the river Fouzon, situated some 12 miles (19 km) southwest of Vierzon at the junction of the D68, D19, D83 and D922 roads. Junction 9 of the A20 autoroute lies within the territory of the commune.

== Population ==
Historical population
| Year | Pop. | ±% p.a. |
|---|---|---|
| 1968 | 2,043 | — |
| 1975 | 2,019 | −0.17% |
| 1982 | 1,844 | −1.29% |
| 1990 | 1,559 | −2.08% |
| 1999 | 1,562 | +0.02% |
| 2007 | 1,532 | −0.24% |
| 2012 | 1,456 | −1.01% |
| 2017 | 1,447 | −0.12% |
| 2023 | 1,234 | −2.62% |
Source: INSEE

== Sights ==
- The church of St. Martin, dating from the twelfth century.
- The church of Notre-Dame, dating from the nineteenth century.
- A dolmen known as the “Pierre Levée" or "Grosse Pierre".
- Remains of medieval ramparts.
- The sixteenth-century chateau of Coulon.

== In popular culture ==
In C.S. Forester’s novel Flying Colours, the then Captain Horatio Hornblower is washed up on grounds of the fictional home of the Count of Graçay, where he hides out for the winter. Forester places the chateau on the river Loire near Nevers, whereas Graçay, which had been an important feudal castle and on the royal road to Limoges, Toulouse and the centre of France, is a bridge on two unimportant rivers that debouch into the Cher, a tributary of the Loire. The description of the castle makes it possible that Forester’s inspiration was the Chateau du Four de Vaux in Varennes-Vauzelles.

== See also ==
- Communes of the Cher department
