= Saint-Martin-d'Auxigny =

Saint-Martin-d’Auxigny
- Commune
- Coat of arms
- Location of Saint-Martin-d’Auxigny
- Location within France Location within Centre-Val de Loire
- Coordinates: 47°12′16″N 2°25′03″E
- Country: France
- Region: Centre-Val de Loire
- Department: Cher
- Arrondissement: Bourges
- Canton: Saint-Martin-d'Auxigny
- Intercommunality: CC Terres du Haut Berry

Government
  - Mayor (2020–2026): Fabrice Chollet
- Area^{1}: 24.08 km^{2} (9.30 sq mi)
- Elevation: 249 m (817 ft)
- Highest elevation: 301 m (988 ft)
- Lowest elevation: 152 m (499 ft)
- Population (2023): 2,546
  - Density: 105.7/km^{2} (273.8/sq mi)
- Time zone: UTC+01:00 (CET)
  - Summer (DST): UTC+02:00 (CEST)
- INSEE/Postal code: 18223 /18110
- ^{1} French Land Register data, which excludes lakes, ponds, glaciers > 1 km^{2} (0.386 sq mi or 247 acres) and river estuaries.

Saint-Martin-d'Auxigny (French pronunciation: [sɛ̃ maʁtɛ̃ doksiɲi]) is a commune in the Cher department in the Centre-Val de Loire region of France.

== Geography ==
An area of lakes and streams, forestry and farming comprising a large village and several hamlets situated about 9 miles (14 km) north of Bourges, at the junction of the D940 with the D56 and the D68 roads.

== Population ==
Historical population
Year	Pop.	±% p.a.
1968	1,659	—
1975	1,635	−0.21%
1982	1,705	+0.60%
1990	1,909	+1.42%
1999	2,018	+0.62%
2007	2,084	+0.40%
2012	2,280	+1.81%
2017	2,397	+1.01%
2023	2,546	+1.01%
Source: INSEE

== Sights ==
- The church of St. Martin, dating from the nineteenth century.
- The ruins of the fifteenth-century chapel at the site of the Château de la Salle le Roi.
- The thirteenth-century chapel of the old priory in the forest at Bléron.

== See also ==
- Communes of the Cher department
