= Saint-Palais, Cher =

Saint-Palais
- Commune
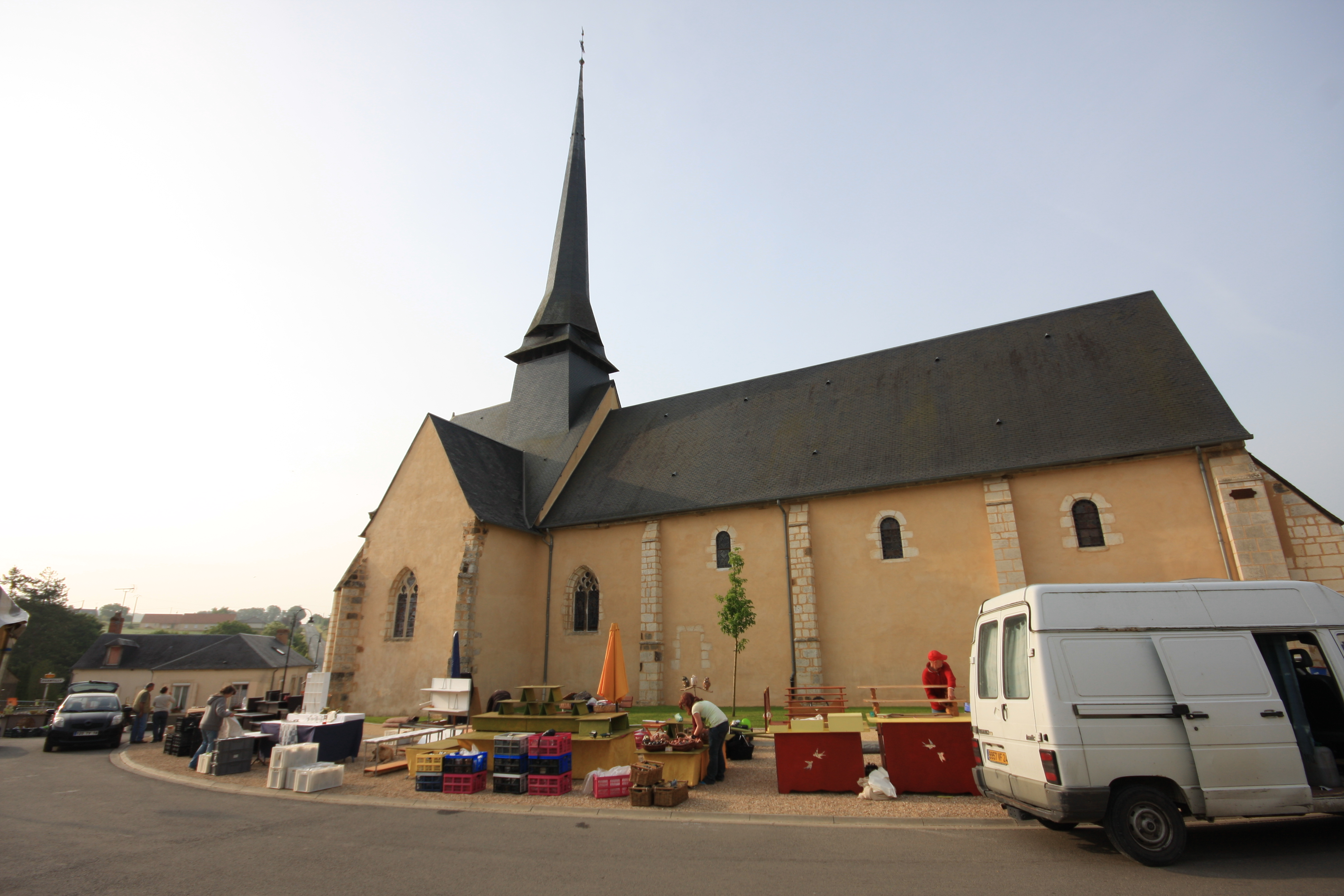
- The church in Saint-Palais

- Coat of arms
- Location of Saint-Palais
- Location within France Location within Centre-Val de Loire
- Coordinates: 47°14′00″N 2°25′15″E
- Country: France
- Region: Centre-Val de Loire
- Department: Cher
- Arrondissement: Bourges
- Canton: Saint-Martin-d'Auxigny
- Intercommunality: CC Terres du Haut Berry

Government
  - Mayor (2020–2026): Aurélie-Elisabeth Chabenat
- Area^{1}: 26.12 km^{2} (10.08 sq mi)
- Elevation: 230 m (750 ft)
- Highest elevation: 310 m (1,020 ft)
- Lowest elevation: 164 m (538 ft)
- Population (2023): 610
  - Density: 23/km^{2} (60/sq mi)
- Time zone: UTC+01:00 (CET)
  - Summer (DST): UTC+02:00 (CEST)
- INSEE/Postal code: 18229 /18110
- ^{1} French Land Register data, which excludes lakes, ponds, glaciers > 1 km^{2} (0.386 sq mi or 247 acres) and river estuaries.

Saint-Palais (French pronunciation: [sɛ̃ palɛ]) is a commune in the Cher department in the Centre-Val de Loire region of France.

== Geography ==
An area of lakes, streams and farming comprising the village and a hamlet situated about 10 miles (16 km) north of Bourges, at the junction of the D940 with the D116 and the D170 roads.

== Population ==
Historical population
Year	Pop.	±% p.a.
1968	536	—
1975	486	−1.39%
1982	587	+2.73%
1990	602	+0.32%
1999	609	+0.13%
2007	629	+0.40%
2012	627	−0.06%
2017	619	−0.26%
2023	610	−0.24%
Source: INSEE

== Sights ==
- The church of St. Palais, dating from the twelfth century.
- The two chateaux, from the 14th and 16th century.

== See also ==
- Communes of the Cher department
