= Canton of Vierzon-2 =

Coordinates: 47°13′21″N 2°4′10″E

Vierzon-2
- Canton
- Interactive map of Vierzon-2
- Country: France
- Region: Centre-Val de Loire
- Department: Cher
- No. of communes: {{{nbcomm}}}
- Population (2023): 15,520
- INSEE code: 18 19

The Canton of Vierzon-2 is a canton situated in the Cher département and in the Centre-Val de Loire region of France.

== Geography ==
A farming and light industrial area in the Cher river valley, forming the northern part of the arrondissement of Vierzon.

== Composition ==
At the French canton reorganisation which came into effect in March 2015, the borders of the canton were changed. It consists of the following 10 communes:

- Dampierre-en-Graçay
- Genouilly
- Graçay
- Méry-sur-Cher
- Nohant-en-Graçay
- Saint-Georges-sur-la-Prée
- Saint-Hilaire-de-Court
- Saint-Outrille
- Thénioux
- Vierzon (partly)

== See also ==
- Arrondissements of the Cher department
- Cantons of the Cher department
- Communes of the Cher department
