= Pigny =

- Commune
- Coat of arms
- Location of Pigny
- Location within France Location within Centre-Val de Loire
- Coordinates: 47°10′14″N 2°26′54″E
- Country: France
- Region: Centre-Val de Loire
- Department: Cher
- Arrondissement: Bourges
- Canton: Saint-Martin-d'Auxigny
- Intercommunality: CC Terres du Haut Berry

Government
  - Mayor (2020–2026): Patrick Richard
- Area^{1}: 8.08 km^{2} (3.12 sq mi)
- Elevation: 210 m (690 ft)
- Highest elevation: 213 m (699 ft)
- Lowest elevation: 144 m (472 ft)
- Population (2023): 966
  - Density: 120/km^{2} (310/sq mi)
- Time zone: UTC+01:00 (CET)
  - Summer (DST): UTC+02:00 (CEST)
- INSEE/Postal code: 18179 /18110
- ^{1} French Land Register data, which excludes lakes, ponds, glaciers > 1 km^{2} (0.386 sq mi or 247 acres) and river estuaries.

Pigny (French pronunciation: [piɲi]) is a commune in the Cher department in the Centre-Val de Loire region of France.

== Geography ==
A farming village situated some 7 miles (11 km) northeast of Bourges, at the junction of the D11 and the D131 roads.

== Population ==
Historical population
| Year | Pop. | ±% p.a. |
|---|---|---|
| 1968 | 361 | — |
| 1975 | 428 | +2.46% |
| 1982 | 597 | +4.87% |
| 1990 | 674 | +1.53% |
| 1999 | 715 | +0.66% |
| 2007 | 743 | +0.48% |
| 2012 | 838 | +2.44% |
| 2017 | 962 | +2.80% |
| 2023 | 966 | +0.07% |
Source: INSEE

== Sights ==
- The church of St. Pierre, dating from the nineteenth century.
- The nineteenth-century chateau.

== See also ==
- Communes of the Cher department
