= Menetou-Salon =

- Commune
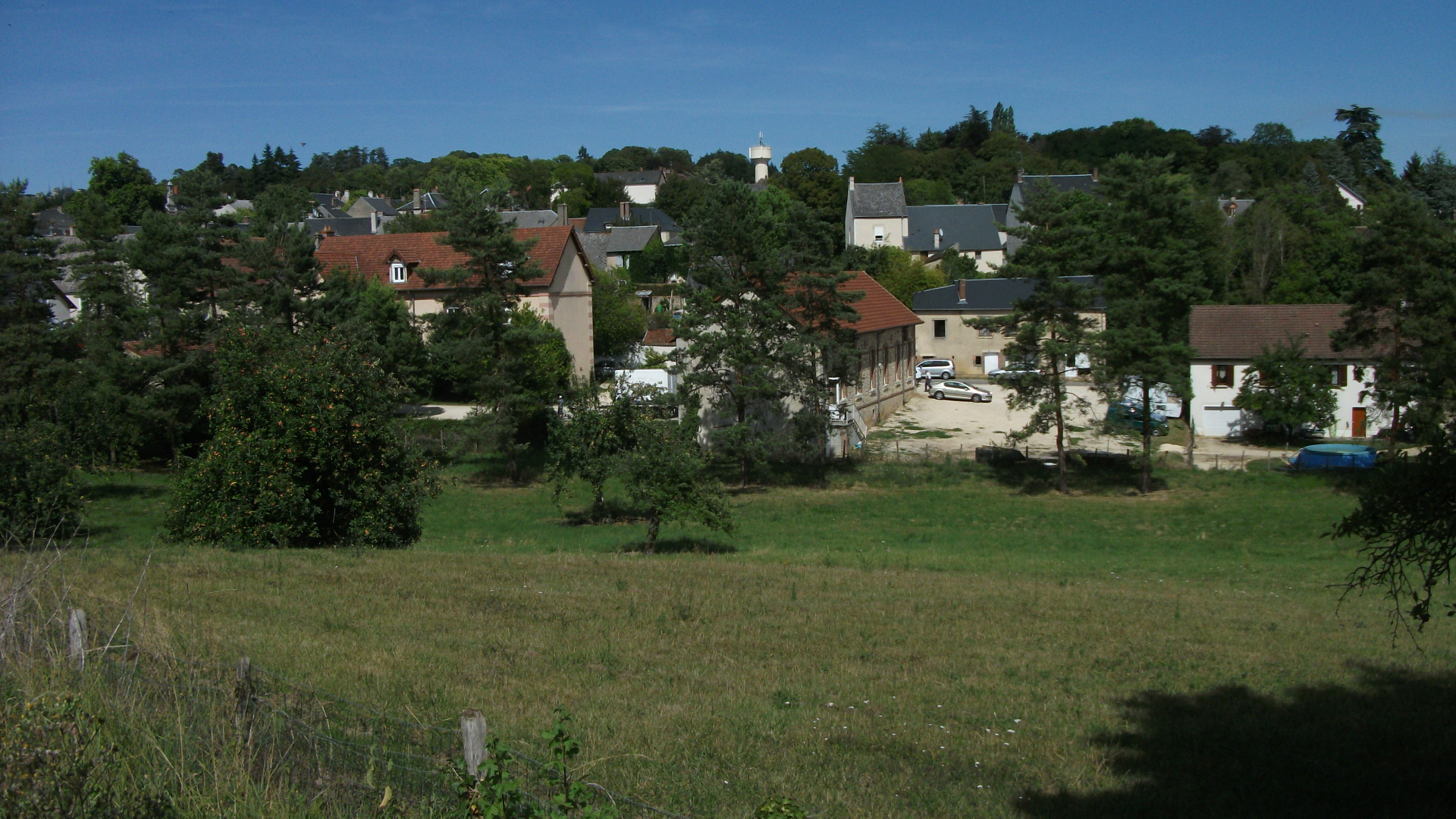
- A general view of Menetou-Salon
- Location of Menetou-Salon
- Location within France Location within Centre-Val de Loire
- Coordinates: 47°13′58″N 2°29′14″E
- Country: France
- Region: Centre-Val de Loire
- Department: Cher
- Arrondissement: Bourges
- Canton: Saint-Martin-d'Auxigny
- Intercommunality: CC Terres du Haut Berry

Government
  - Mayor (2020–2026): Pierre Fouchet
- Area^{1}: 37.66 km^{2} (14.54 sq mi)
- Elevation: 210 m (690 ft)
- Highest elevation: 312 m (1,024 ft)
- Lowest elevation: 174 m (571 ft)
- Population (2023): 1,626
  - Density: 43.18/km^{2} (111.8/sq mi)
- Time zone: UTC+01:00 (CET)
  - Summer (DST): UTC+02:00 (CEST)
- INSEE/Postal code: 18145 /18510
- ^{1} French Land Register data, which excludes lakes, ponds, glaciers > 1 km^{2} (0.386 sq mi or 247 acres) and river estuaries.

Menetou-Salon (French pronunciation: [mɛntu salɔ̃]) is a commune in the Cher department in the Centre-Val de Loire region of France. Inhabitants of the area are known as Monestrosaloniens.

== Geography ==
The commune is located 16 kilometres (10 mi) north of Bourges on the RD11. Directions: the RD940 Bourges / Montargis / Paris Autoroute A71 Paris / Clermont-Ferrand, take the Bourges exit. S.N.C.F Bourges train station

== History ==
In 1190, Hugues de Vèrre, Lord of Menetou-Salon also yielded the land.

== Administration ==
Table of successive mayors
Period in office	Name	Party	Occupation
March 2008	Pierre Fouchet		
March 2001 March 2008	Bernard Remangeon		

== Wine ==
Menetou-Salon is the name of an Appellation d'origine contrôlée for wine (AOC), with vineyards extending over 330 hectares (820 acres) over the hill. This appellation covers an area of 10 communes, one of which is Menetou-Salon itself. Wines grown here are white made entirely from Sauvignon Blanc, red and rose made from Pinot Noir. The well-known Sancerre AOC is its immediate north-eastern neighbor. Menetou-Salon is an ancient wine-producing area if old writings and documents about the seigniory and lordship of Menetou are to be believed. Documents from the years 1063, 1097 at 1100 have been recovered, where the Lord of Menetou gave a donation to different religious orders in the region, most particularly to the Saint-Sulpice-lès-Bourges Abbey, with vines located close to Davet. In 1190, Hugues de Vèvre, Lord of Menetou-Salon, also yielded the grounds and vines at the Loroy Abbey. Finally, the old writings relating to the wine of the Menetou-Salon vineyard, which is one of the most beautiful adornments of the stately table of silversmith Jacques Coeur, acquired by the seigniory of Menetou in 1450. They even say that Agnès Sorel, when she came to rest under the old limetree which is still standing near the chateau to this day, particularly appreciated the wine of « Clos de la Dame ».

Sauvignon Blanc

== Château de Menetou-Salon ==
The Château de Menetou-Salon was extended in the 1880s by Ernest Sanson for Prince Auguste d'Arenberg, 2nd Duke of Arenberg. The chateau, a masterpiece of neo-gothic architecture, provides extra income as an historical monument, having belonged to Jacques Coeur in 1448, of which the Palais Jacques Coeur inspired its expansion. It gives its visitors the chance to admire its historical interior, which has been beautifully conserved as a stately residence of the 20th century. There, you can also find ceremonial saddlery, a neo-gothic labyrinth garden, as well as horse-drawn carriages and automobiles used by the princes of Arenberg until the Second World War, when a prince used one of the vehicles to travel from Paris to Moscow twice, once in 1911 and then in 1968, and again in 1994, when the Channel Tunnel was opened.

The current chateau is an example of five centuries worth of construction dating from the 14th century until 1888, when major modifications turned it into a grandiose residence inhabited by the actual proprietor, Prince Pierre d'Arenberg (b. 1961), who became the 4th Duke of Arenberg in 1967. Completely furnished, the Menetou chateau has some beautiful features, such as a library with 12,000 books, a hall decorated like a chapter house from an abbey, one of Jacques Coeur's travel chests, and cloths from a Flemish school. The place serves as a reminder of the great nobleman, Prince Auguste d'Arenberg, who began the major renovations of the château in the 19th century.

The chateau in Menetou-Salon is a stop on the Route Jacques-Coeur, a tour of various French historic sites. The chateau still belongs to the Arenberg family.

== See also ==
- Communes of the Cher department
