= Allogny =

- Commune
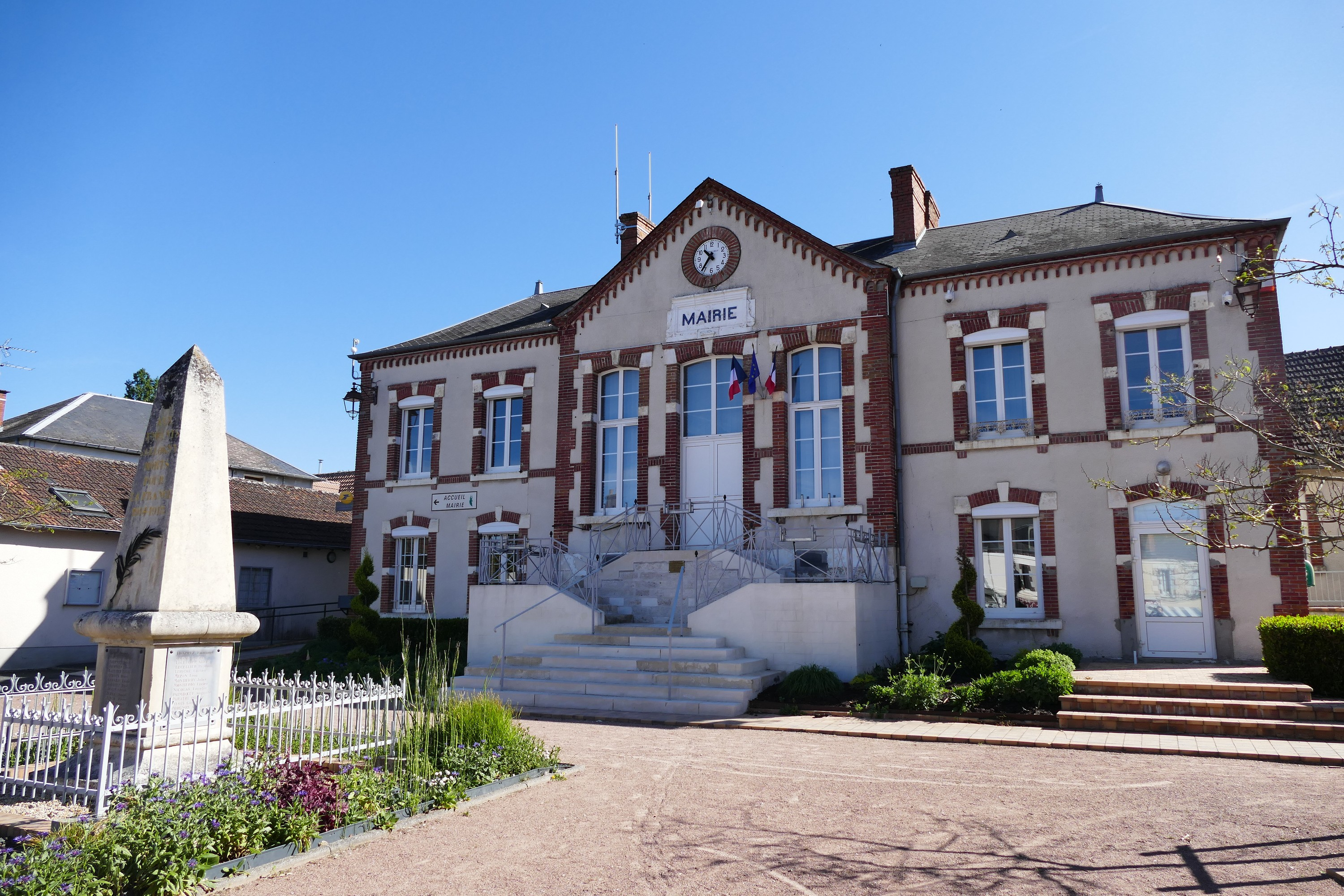
- Allogny Town hall
- Location of Allogny
- Location within France Location within Centre-Val de Loire
- Coordinates: 47°13′37″N 2°19′26″E
- Country: France
- Region: Centre-Val de Loire
- Department: Cher
- Arrondissement: Bourges
- Canton: Saint-Martin-d'Auxigny
- Intercommunality: Terres du Haut Berry

Government
  - Mayor (2020–2026): Bruno Siravo
- Area^{1}: 49.53 km^{2} (19.12 sq mi)
- Elevation: 128 m (420 ft)
- Highest elevation: 288 m (945 ft)
- Lowest elevation: 138 m (453 ft)
- Population (2023): 1,142
  - Density: 23.06/km^{2} (59.72/sq mi)
- Time zone: UTC+01:00 (CET)
  - Summer (DST): UTC+02:00 (CEST)
- INSEE/Postal code: 18004 /18110
- ^{1} French Land Register data, which excludes lakes, ponds, glaciers > 1 km^{2} (0.386 sq mi or 247 acres) and river estuaries.

Allogny (French pronunciation: [alɔɲi]) is a commune in the Cher department of the Centre-Val de Loire region of France.

== Geography ==
An area of forestry and farming comprising the village and several hamlets situated some 10 miles (16 km) north of Bourges, at the junction of the D944 with the D56 and D20 roads.

== Population ==
Historical population
Year	Pop.	±% p.a.
1968	534	—
1975	623	+2.23%
1982	765	+2.98%
1990	916	+2.28%
1999	896	−0.24%
2007	987	+1.22%
2012	1,031	+0.88%
2017	1,017	−0.27%
2023	1,142	+1.95%
Source: INSEE

== Sights ==
- The church of St.Sulpice, dating from the thirteenth century.
- The seventeenth century manorhouse at Beauchêne.
- A feudal motte.
- The war memorial.

== See also ==
- Communes of the Cher department
