= Fussy =

- Commune
- Location of Fussy
- Location within France Location within Centre-Val de Loire
- Coordinates: 47°08′43″N 2°25′47″E
- Country: France
- Region: Centre-Val de Loire
- Department: Cher
- Arrondissement: Bourges
- Canton: Saint-Martin-d'Auxigny
- Intercommunality: CC Terres du Haut Berry

Government
  - Mayor (2021–2026): Denis Coquery
- Area^{1}: 11.08 km^{2} (4.28 sq mi)
- Highest elevation: 168 m (551 ft)
- Lowest elevation: 133 m (436 ft)
- Population (2023): 1,891
  - Density: 170.7/km^{2} (442.0/sq mi)
- Time zone: UTC+01:00 (CET)
  - Summer (DST): UTC+02:00 (CEST)
- INSEE/Postal code: 18097 /18110
- ^{1} French Land Register data, which excludes lakes, ponds, glaciers > 1 km^{2} (0.386 sq mi or 247 acres) and river estuaries.

Fussy (French pronunciation: [fysi]) is a commune in the Cher department in the Centre-Val de Loire region of France.

== Geography ==
The village is in an agricultural area, with a little light industry. It is around 8 km north of the centre of Bourges at the junction of the D940 and D11 roads.

== Population ==
Historical population
Year	Pop.	±% p.a.
1968	560	—
1975	1,029	+9.08%
1982	1,762	+7.99%
1990	2,011	+1.67%
1999	1,951	−0.34%
2007	1,827	−0.82%
2012	2,007	+1.90%
2017	1,982	−0.25%
2023	1,891	−0.78%
Source: INSEE

== Sights ==
- The church of St. Hilaire, dating from the nineteenth century.
- The World War II museum, opened in 1994.

== International relations ==
Fussy is twinned with:

- Corminboeuf, Switzerland since May, 1991.

== See also ==
- Communes of the Cher department
