= Saint-Éloy-de-Gy =

- Commune
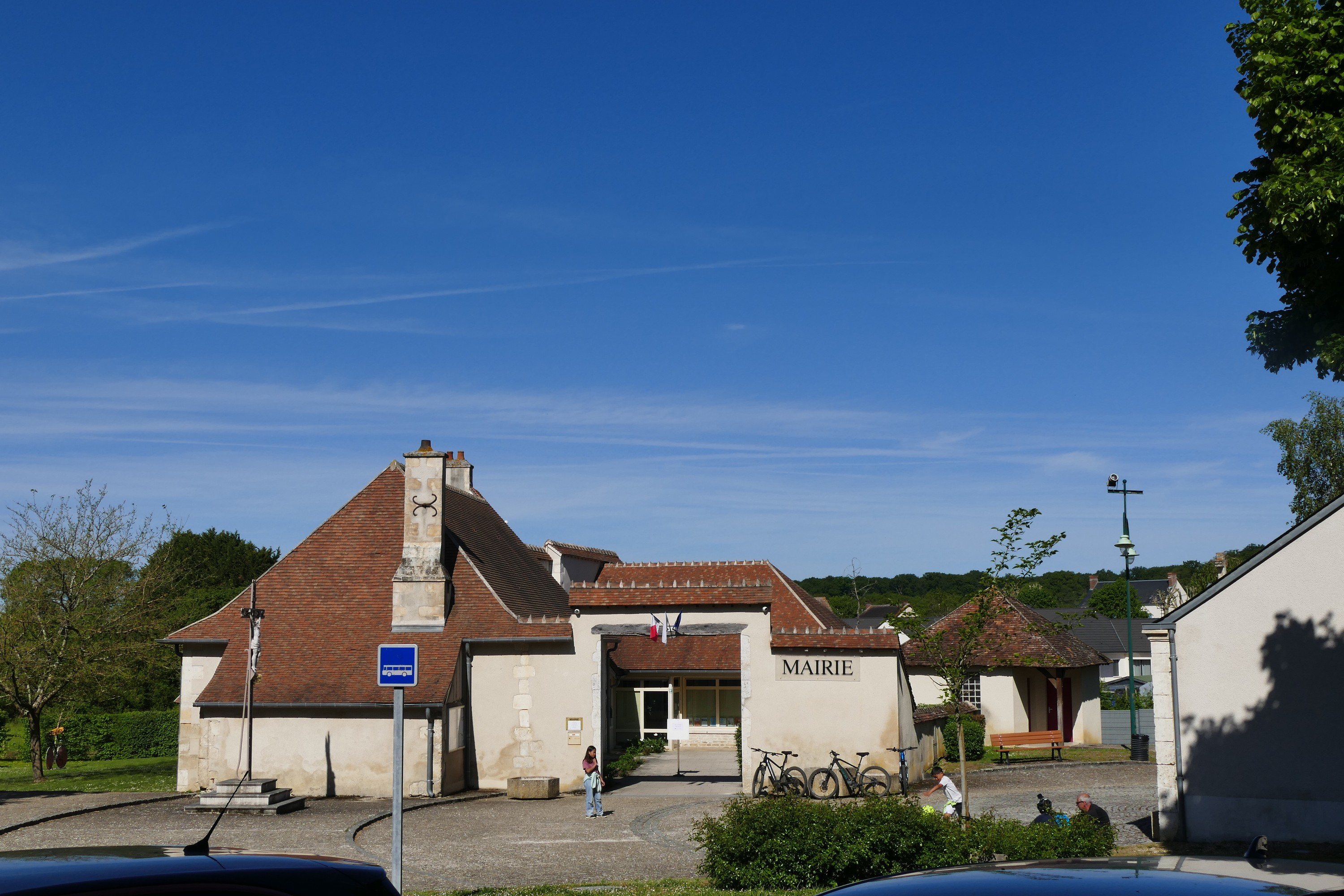
- Saint-Éloy-de-Gy Town hall
- Location of Saint-Éloy-de-Gy
- Location within France Location within Centre-Val de Loire
- Coordinates: 47°09′25″N 2°20′35″E
- Country: France
- Region: Centre-Val de Loire
- Department: Cher
- Arrondissement: Bourges
- Canton: Saint-Martin-d'Auxigny
- Intercommunality: CC Terres du Haut Berry

Government
  - Mayor (2020–2026): Gilles Benoit
- Area^{1}: 31.2 km^{2} (12.0 sq mi)
- Elevation: 150 m (490 ft)
- Highest elevation: 235 m (771 ft)
- Lowest elevation: 133 m (436 ft)
- Population (2023): 1,581
  - Density: 50.7/km^{2} (131/sq mi)
- Time zone: UTC+01:00 (CET)
  - Summer (DST): UTC+02:00 (CEST)
- INSEE/Postal code: 18206 /18110
- ^{1} French Land Register data, which excludes lakes, ponds, glaciers > 1 km^{2} (0.386 sq mi or 247 acres) and river estuaries.

Saint-Éloy-de-Gy (French pronunciation: [sɛ̃.t‿elwa də ʒi]) is a commune in the Cher department in the Centre-Val de Loire region of France.

== Geography ==
Saint-Éloy-de-Gy is an area of forestry and farming comprising two villages and several hamlets situated some 5 miles (8.0 km) northwest of Bourges, at the junction of the D944 with the D160 and D68 roads.

== Population ==
Historical population
Year	Pop.	±% p.a.
1968	1,028	—
1975	920	−1.57%
1982	1,071	+2.19%
1990	1,269	+2.14%
1999	1,382	+0.95%
2007	1,513	+1.14%
2012	1,541	+0.37%
2017	1,541	+0.00%
2023	1,581	+0.43%
Source: INSEE

== Sights ==
- The church of St. Éloy, dating from the twelfth century.
- The fifteenth-century Château de Dame.

== See also ==
- Communes of the Cher department
