= Saint-Georges-sur-Moulon =

- Commune
- Location of Saint-Georges-sur-Moulon
- Location within France Location within Centre-Val de Loire
- Coordinates: 47°11′28″N 2°25′24″E
- Country: France
- Region: Centre-Val de Loire
- Department: Cher
- Arrondissement: Bourges
- Canton: Saint-Martin-d'Auxigny
- Intercommunality: CC Terres du Haut Berry

Government
  - Mayor (2020–2026): Pierre-Yves Charpentier
- Area^{1}: 9.43 km^{2} (3.64 sq mi)
- Elevation: 162 m (531 ft)
- Highest elevation: 212 m (696 ft)
- Lowest elevation: 142 m (466 ft)
- Population (2023): 728
  - Density: 77.2/km^{2} (200/sq mi)
- Time zone: UTC+01:00 (CET)
  - Summer (DST): UTC+02:00 (CEST)
- INSEE/Postal code: 18211 /18110
- ^{1} French Land Register data, which excludes lakes, ponds, glaciers > 1 km^{2} (0.386 sq mi or 247 acres) and river estuaries.

Saint-Georges-sur-Moulon (French pronunciation: [sɛ̃ ʒɔʁʒ syʁ mulɔ̃]) is a commune in the Cher department in the Centre-Val de Loire region of France.

== Geography ==
An area of lakes, streams and farming comprising the village and two hamlets situated on the banks of the river Moulon about 9 miles (14 km) north of Bourges, at the junction of the D940 with the D131 and the D56 roads.

== Population ==
Historical population
Year	Pop.	±% p.a.
1968	362	—
1975	414	+1.94%
1982	524	+3.42%
1990	645	+2.63%
1999	667	+0.37%
2007	733	+1.19%
2012	748	+0.41%
2017	696	−1.43%
2023	728	+0.75%
Source: INSEE

== Sights ==
- The chateau des Granges, dating from the nineteenth century.
- A menhir known as the "Pierre à la Femme".
- Traces of a Roman aqueduct.
- A watermill, the Moulin Neuf.

== See also ==
- Communes of the Cher department
