= Flying Colors =

With flying colours is a proverbial phrase in the English language.

Flying Colors or Flying Colours may refer to:

== Film and TV ==
- Flying Colors (1917 film), a silent American action film
- Flying Colors (2015 film), a Japanese film
- Flying Colors (2026 film), a Spanish coming-of-age comedy-drama film

== Music ==
- Flying Colors (band), American musical supergroup
- Flying Colors (musical), a 1932 musical
- Flying Colours (Bliss n Eso album), 2008
- Flying Colours (Chris de Burgh album), 1988
- Flying Colors (Flying Colors album), 2012
- Flying Colors (Robert Ellis Orrall album), 1992; or the title song
- Flying Colors (Ricky Ford album), 1980
- Flying Colours (Shad album), 2013
- Flying Colors (Trooper album), 1979
- "Flying Colours", a song from the 1982 album The Broadsword and the Beast by Jethro Tull

== Other uses ==
- Flying Colours (airline), a UK charter airline that operated for 4 years between 1996 and 2000
- Flying Colours (novel), a 1938 Horatio Hornblower novel written by C.S. Forester
