= Fouzon =

River in central France

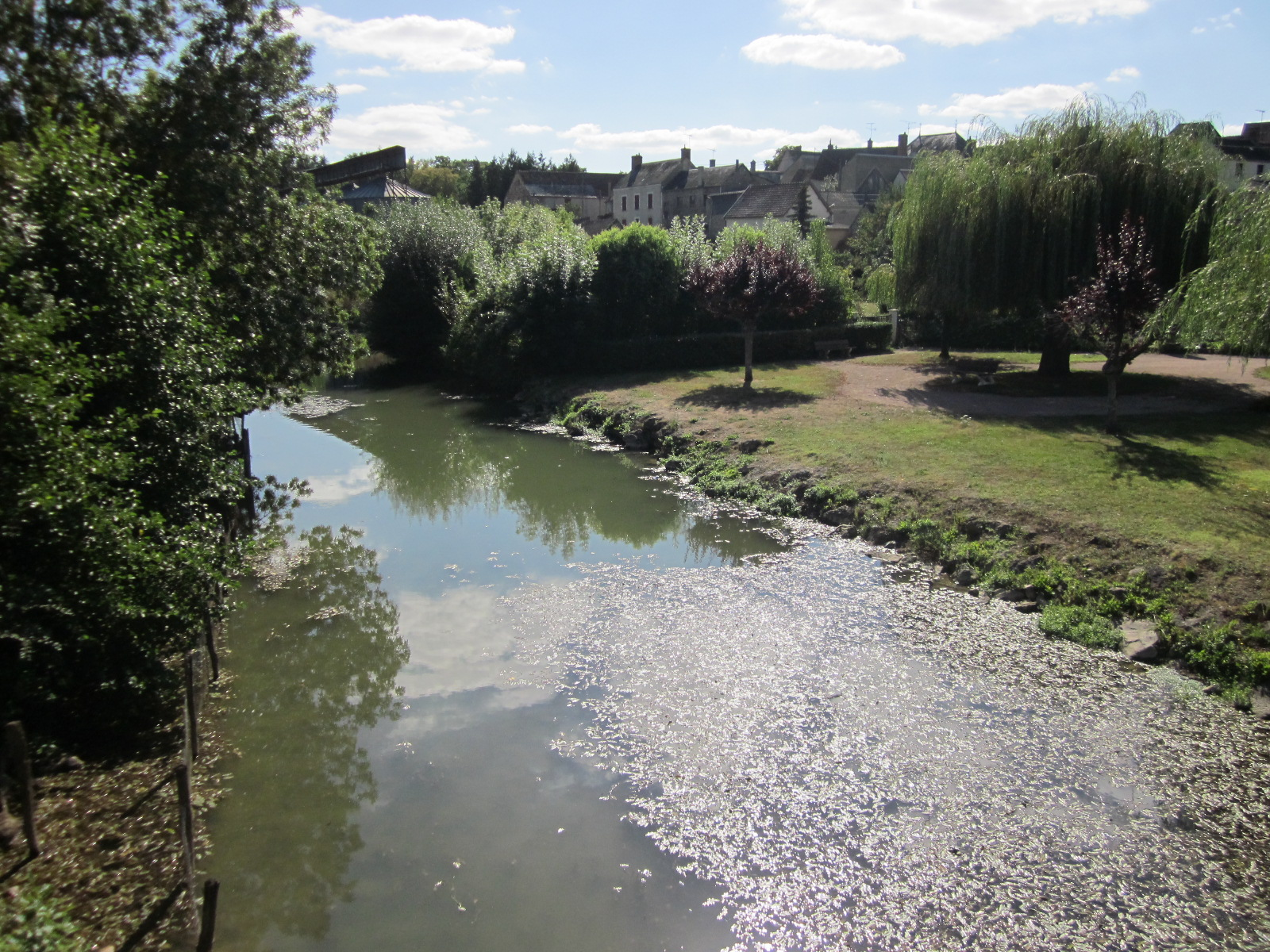

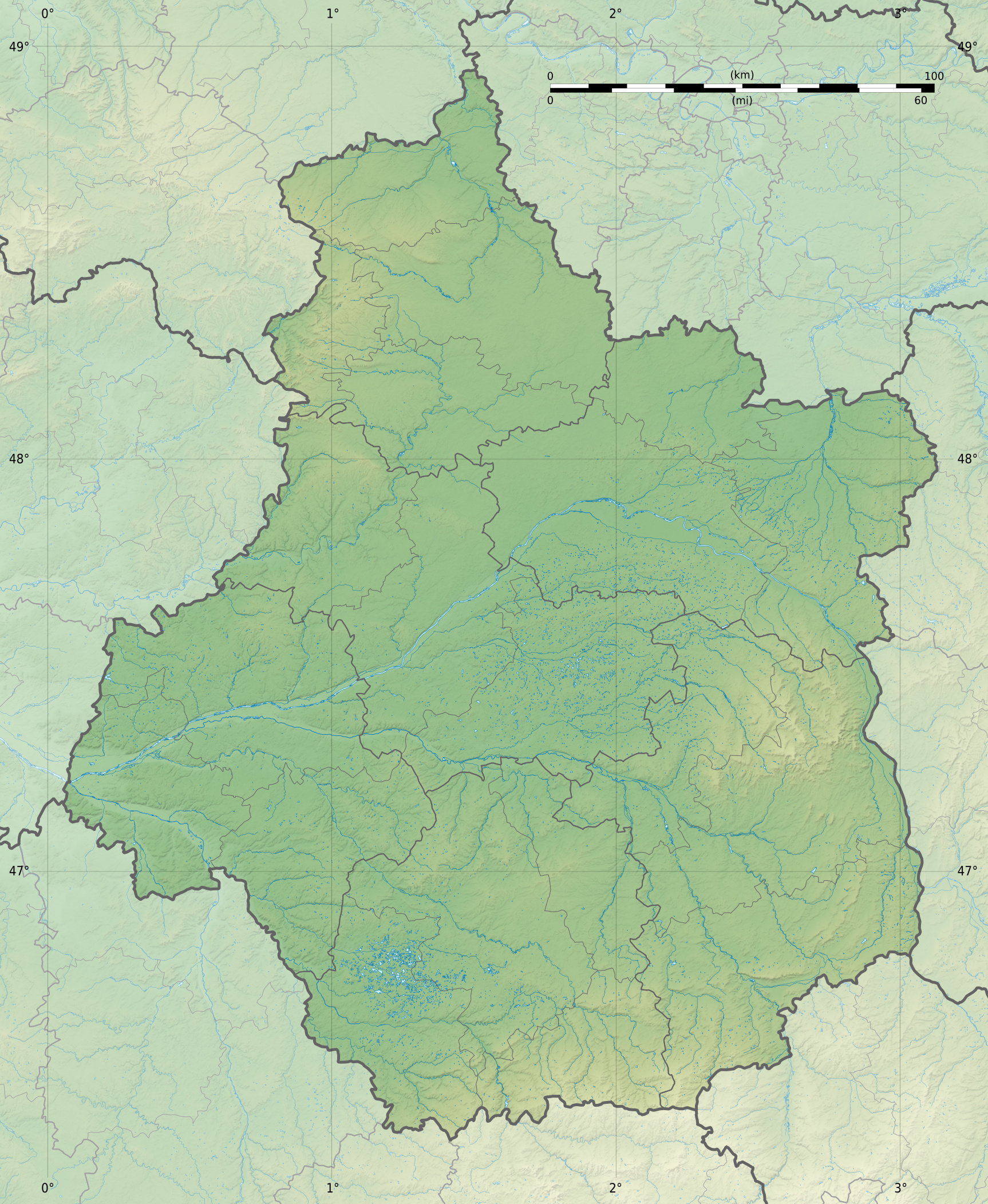
- Location within France Location within Centre-Val de Loire

Location
- Country: France

Physical characteristics
- Mouth
  - location: Cher
  - coordinates: 47°15′47″N 1°27′30″E
- Length: 59.0 km (36.7 mi)
- Basin size: 1,002 km^{2} (387 mi^{2})

Basin features
- Progression: Cher→ Loire→ Atlantic Ocean
- Tributaries
  - left: Nahon, Renon

The Fouzon (French pronunciation: [fuzɔ̃]) is a 59.0 km (36.7 mi) long river in central France, a left tributary of the Cher. Its source is near the village of Nohant-en-Graçay. The Fouzon flows generally northwest, through the following departments and towns:

- Cher: Graçay
- Indre: Chabris, Val-Fouzon
- Loir-et-Cher: Meusnes

The Fouzon flows into the Cher near Couffy.
