= Vignoux-sous-les-Aix =

- Commune
- Location of Vignoux-sous-les-Aix
- Location within France Location within Centre-Val de Loire
- Coordinates: 47°11′16″N 2°27′53″E
- Country: France
- Region: Centre-Val de Loire
- Department: Cher
- Arrondissement: Bourges
- Canton: Saint-Martin-d'Auxigny
- Intercommunality: CC Terres du Haut Berry

Government
  - Mayor (2020–2026): Thierry Cosson
- Area^{1}: 14.94 km^{2} (5.77 sq mi)
- Elevation: 153 m (502 ft)
- Highest elevation: 169 m (554 ft)
- Lowest elevation: 120 m (390 ft)
- Population (2023): 708
  - Density: 47.4/km^{2} (123/sq mi)
- Demonym: Vignogilois
- Time zone: UTC+01:00 (CET)
  - Summer (DST): UTC+02:00 (CEST)
- INSEE/Postal code: 18280 /18110
- ^{1} French Land Register data, which excludes lakes, ponds, glaciers > 1 km^{2} (0.386 sq mi or 247 acres) and river estuaries.

Vignoux-sous-les-Aix (French pronunciation: [viɲu su le.z‿ɛks], literally Vignoux under Les Aix) is a commune in the Cher department in the Centre-Val de Loire region of France.

== Geography ==
A winegrowing and farming village situated about 9 miles (14 km) northeast of Bourges at the junction of the D186 with the D11 and the D56 roads.

== Population ==
Historical population
Year	Pop.	±% p.a.
1968	255	—
1975	286	+1.65%
1982	418	+5.57%
1990	624	+5.14%
1999	657	+0.57%
2007	707	+0.92%
2012	709	+0.06%
2017	719	+0.28%
2023	708	−0.26%
Source: INSEE

== Sights ==
- The church of St. Loup, dating from the twelfth century.

== See also ==
- Communes of the Cher department
