= Dampierre-en-Graçay =

- Commune
- Location of Dampierre-en-Graçay
- Location within France Location within Centre-Val de Loire
- Coordinates: 47°10′49″N 1°56′37″E
- Country: France
- Region: Centre-Val de Loire
- Department: Cher
- Arrondissement: Vierzon
- Canton: Vierzon-2
- Intercommunality: CC Vierzon-Sologne-Berry

Government
  - Mayor (2020–2026): Henri Letourneau
- Area^{1}: 9.38 km^{2} (3.62 sq mi)
- Elevation: 135 m (443 ft)
- Highest elevation: 171 m (561 ft)
- Lowest elevation: 107 m (351 ft)
- Population (2023): 252
  - Density: 26.9/km^{2} (69.6/sq mi)
- Time zone: UTC+01:00 (CET)
  - Summer (DST): UTC+02:00 (CEST)
- INSEE/Postal code: 18085 /18310
- ^{1} French Land Register data, which excludes lakes, ponds, glaciers > 1 km^{2} (0.386 sq mi or 247 acres) and river estuaries.

Dampierre-en-Graçay (French pronunciation: [dɑ̃pjɛʁ ɑ̃ ɡʁasɛ]) is a commune in the Cher department in the Centre-Val de Loire region of France.

== Geography ==
A farming area comprising a small village and several hamlets situated some 8 miles (13 km) southwest of Vierzon at the junction of the D163, D63, D75 and D108 roads.

== Population ==
Historical population
| Year | Pop. | ±% p.a. |
|---|---|---|
| 1968 | 190 | — |
| 1975 | 181 | −0.69% |
| 1982 | 170 | −0.89% |
| 1990 | 271 | +6.00% |
| 1999 | 225 | −2.05% |
| 2007 | 225 | +0.00% |
| 2012 | 255 | +2.53% |
| 2017 | 248 | −0.56% |
| 2023 | 252 | +0.27% |
Source: INSEE

== See also ==
- Communes of the Cher department
