= Vasselay =

- Commune
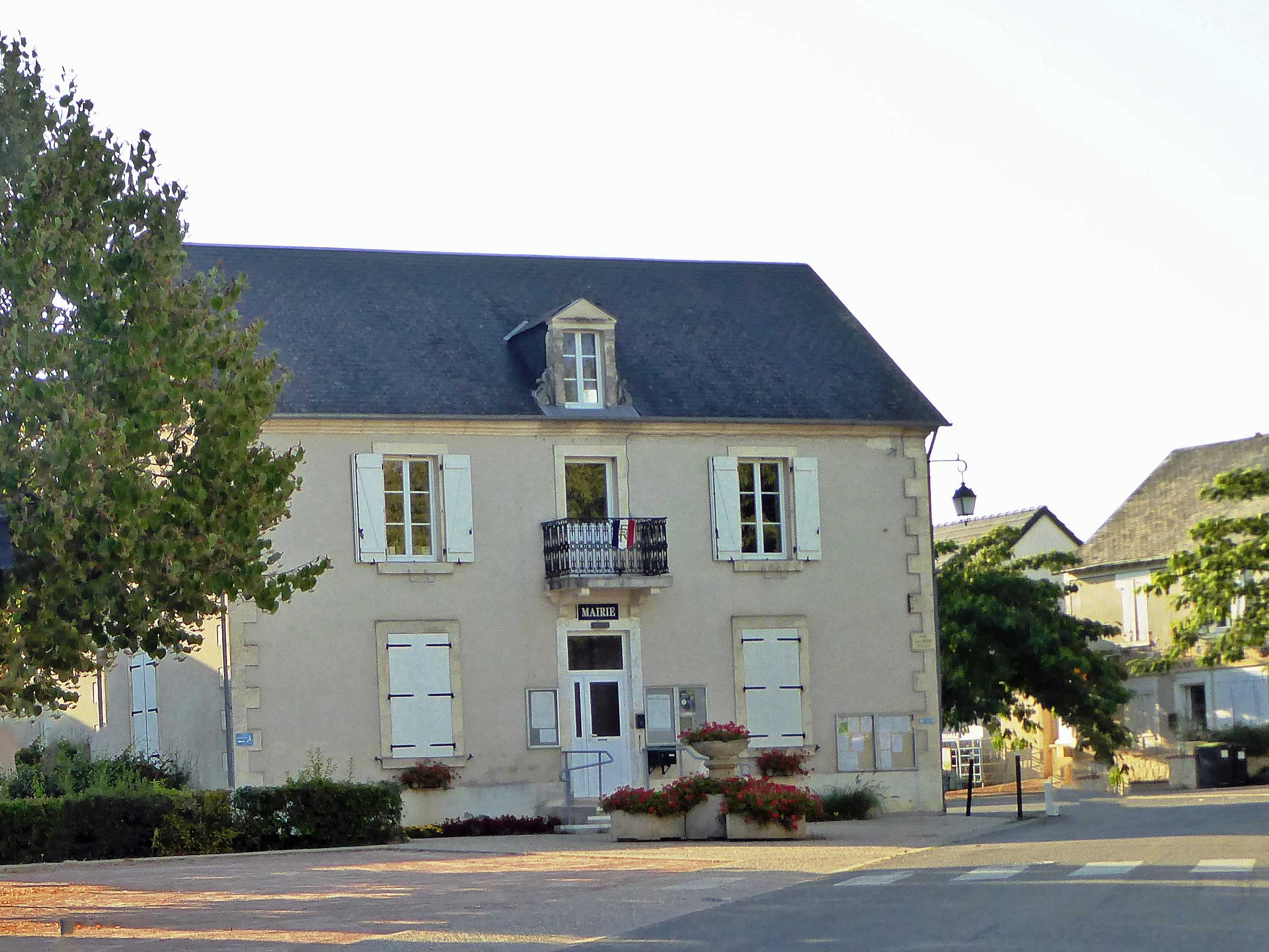
- Vasselay Town hall

- Coat of arms
- Location of Vasselay
- Location within France Location within Centre-Val de Loire
- Coordinates: 47°09′31″N 2°23′21″E
- Country: France
- Region: Centre-Val de Loire
- Department: Cher
- Arrondissement: Bourges
- Canton: Saint-Martin-d'Auxigny
- Intercommunality: CC Terres du Haut Berry

Government
  - Mayor (2023–2026): Jean-Luc Leger
- Area^{1}: 20.21 km^{2} (7.80 sq mi)
- Elevation: 182 m (597 ft)
- Highest elevation: 218 m (715 ft)
- Lowest elevation: 135 m (443 ft)
- Population (2023): 1,579
  - Density: 78.13/km^{2} (202.4/sq mi)
- Time zone: UTC+01:00 (CET)
  - Summer (DST): UTC+02:00 (CEST)
- INSEE/Postal code: 18271 /18110
- ^{1} French Land Register data, which excludes lakes, ponds, glaciers > 1 km^{2} (0.386 sq mi or 247 acres) and river estuaries.

Vasselay (French pronunciation: [vaslɛ]) is a commune in the Cher department in the Centre-Val de Loire region of France.

== Geography ==
A farming area comprising the village and a couple of hamlets situated immediately north of Bourges on the D58 road.

== Population ==
Historical population
Year	Pop.	±% p.a.
1968	645	—
1975	647	+0.04%
1982	735	+1.84%
1990	1,020	+4.18%
1999	1,095	+0.79%
2007	1,145	+0.56%
2012	1,213	+1.16%
2017	1,447	+3.59%
2023	1,579	+1.47%
Source: INSEE

== Sights ==
- The church, dating from the nineteenth century.
- The chateau of Puyvallée, dating from the eighteenth century.

== See also ==
- Communes of the Cher department
