= Cantons of the Cher department =

The following is a list of the 19 cantons of the Cher department, in France, following the French canton reorganisation which came into effect in March 2015:

- Aubigny-sur-Nère
- Avord
- Bourges-1
- Bourges-2
- Bourges-3
- Bourges-4
- Chârost
- Châteaumeillant
- Dun-sur-Auron
- La Guerche-sur-l'Aubois
- Mehun-sur-Yèvre
- Saint-Amand-Montrond
- Saint-Doulchard
- Saint-Germain-du-Puy
- Saint-Martin-d'Auxigny
- Sancerre
- Trouy
- Vierzon-1
- Vierzon-2
