= Quantilly =

- Commune
- Location of Quantilly
- Location within France Location within Centre-Val de Loire
- Coordinates: 47°13′30″N 2°26′44″E
- Country: France
- Region: Centre-Val de Loire
- Department: Cher
- Arrondissement: Bourges
- Canton: Saint-Martin-d'Auxigny
- Intercommunality: Terres du Haut Berry

Government
  - Mayor (2020–2026): Béatrice Damade
- Area^{1}: 12.69 km^{2} (4.90 sq mi)
- Elevation: 225 m (738 ft)
- Highest elevation: 286 m (938 ft)
- Lowest elevation: 161 m (528 ft)
- Population (2023): 490
  - Density: 39/km^{2} (100/sq mi)
- Time zone: UTC+01:00 (CET)
  - Summer (DST): UTC+02:00 (CEST)
- INSEE/Postal code: 18189 /18110
- ^{1} French Land Register data, which excludes lakes, ponds, glaciers > 1 km^{2} (0.386 sq mi or 247 acres) and river estuaries.

Quantilly (French pronunciation: [kɑ̃tiji]) is a commune in the Cher department in the Centre-Val de Loire region of France.

== Geography ==
An area of vineyards, forestry and farming comprising the village and two hamlets situated some 10 miles (16 km) north of Bourges, at the junction of the D16, D208 and the D59 roads. The grapes for Menetou-Salon wine are grown here.

== Population ==
Historical population
| Year | Pop. | ±% p.a. |
|---|---|---|
| 1968 | 401 | — |
| 1975 | 352 | −1.84% |
| 1982 | 346 | −0.25% |
| 1990 | 456 | +3.51% |
| 1999 | 442 | −0.35% |
| 2007 | 435 | −0.20% |
| 2012 | 442 | +0.32% |
| 2017 | 470 | +1.24% |
| 2023 | 490 | +0.70% |
Source: INSEE

== Sights ==
- The church of St Genou, dating from the eighteenth century.
- The nineteenth-century chateau of Champgrand.
- The eighteenth-century chateau of Quantilly.

== See also ==
- Communes of the Cher department
