= Saint-Georges-sur-la-Prée =

- Commune
- Location of Saint-Georges-sur-la-Prée
- Location within France Location within Centre-Val de Loire
- Coordinates: 47°13′37″N 1°56′15″E
- Country: France
- Region: Centre-Val de Loire
- Department: Cher
- Arrondissement: Vierzon
- Canton: Vierzon-2
- Intercommunality: CC Vierzon-Sologne-Berry

Government
  - Mayor (2020–2026): Jean-Marc Duguet
- Area^{1}: 22.83 km^{2} (8.81 sq mi)
- Elevation: 122 m (400 ft)
- Highest elevation: 151 m (495 ft)
- Lowest elevation: 91 m (299 ft)
- Population (2023): 591
  - Density: 25.9/km^{2} (67.0/sq mi)
- Time zone: UTC+01:00 (CET)
  - Summer (DST): UTC+02:00 (CEST)
- INSEE/Postal code: 18210 /18100
- ^{1} French Land Register data, which excludes lakes, ponds, glaciers > 1 km^{2} (0.386 sq mi or 247 acres) and river estuaries.

Saint-Georges-sur-la-Prée (French pronunciation: [sɛ̃ ʒɔʁʒ syʁ la pʁe]) is a commune in the Cher department in the Centre-Val de Loire region of France.

== Geography ==
A farming area comprising the village and a hamlet situated in the Cher valley, about 4 miles (6.4 km) west of Vierzon at the junction of the D163, D90 and D19 roads.

== Population ==
Historical population
Year	Pop.	±% p.a.
1968	401	—
1975	347	−2.05%
1982	367	+0.80%
1990	590	+6.11%
1999	601	+0.21%
2007	631	+0.61%
2012	650	+0.60%
2017	611	−1.23%
2023	591	−0.55%
Source: INSEE

== Sights ==
- The church of St. Georges, dating from the twelfth century.
- The château de Rozay, dating from the fifteenth century.
- A sixteenth-century priory on the foundations of the old abbey of Dèvres.
- A museum and art gallery.

== See also ==
- Communes of the Cher department
