= Nohant-en-Graçay =

- Commune
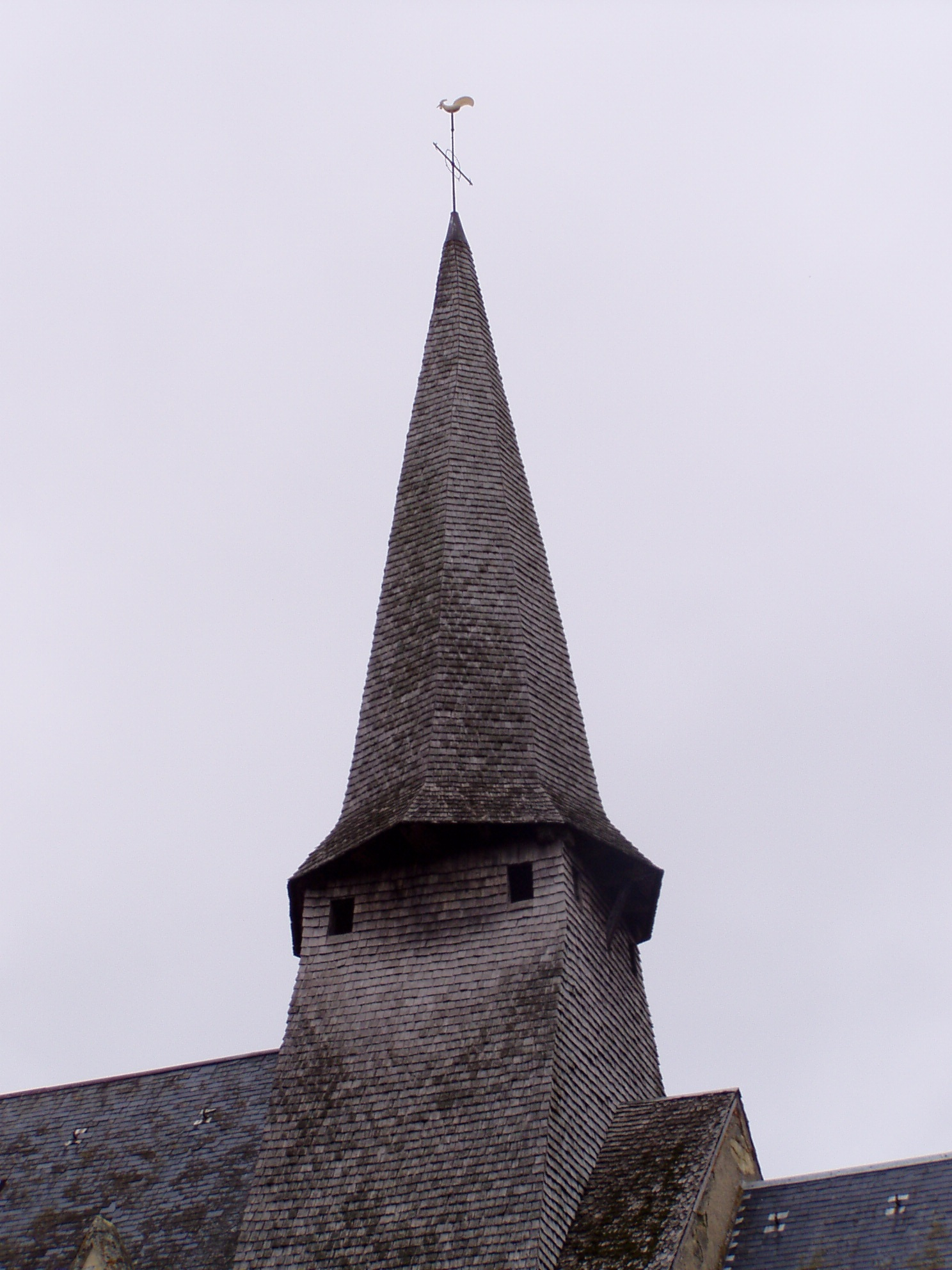
- The steeple of the church of Saint-Martin, in Nohant-en-Graçay
- Location of Nohant-en-Graçay
- Location within France Location within Centre-Val de Loire
- Coordinates: 47°08′15″N 1°53′41″E
- Country: France
- Region: Centre-Val de Loire
- Department: Cher
- Arrondissement: Vierzon
- Canton: Vierzon-2
- Intercommunality: CC Vierzon-Sologne-Berry

Government
  - Mayor (2020–2026): Serge Perrochon
- Area^{1}: 23.78 km^{2} (9.18 sq mi)
- Highest elevation: 167 m (548 ft)
- Lowest elevation: 112 m (367 ft)
- Population (2023): 289
  - Density: 12.2/km^{2} (31.5/sq mi)
- Time zone: UTC+01:00 (CET)
  - Summer (DST): UTC+02:00 (CEST)
- INSEE/Postal code: 18167 /18310
- ^{1} French Land Register data, which excludes lakes, ponds, glaciers > 1 km^{2} (0.386 sq mi or 247 acres) and river estuaries.

Nohant-en-Graçay (French pronunciation: [nɔɑ̃ ɑ̃ ɡʁasɛ]) is a commune in the Cher department in the Centre-Val de Loire region of France.

== Geography ==
A farming area comprising a small village and two hamlets situated some 19 kilometres (12 mi) southwest of Vierzon at the junction of the D68, D163 and D164 roads. The A20 runs through the commune.

== Population ==
Historical population
Year	Pop.	±% p.a.
1968	398	—
1975	370	−1.04%
1982	318	−2.14%
1990	296	−0.89%
1999	306	+0.37%
2007	312	+0.24%
2012	298	−0.91%
2017	306	+0.53%
2023	289	−0.95%
Source: INSEE

== Sights ==
- The church, dating from the twelfth century.
- The house of Zulma Carraud, writer and friend of Balzac, next to the church.

== See also ==
- Communes of the Cher department
