= Genouilly, Cher =

Genouilly
- Commune
- Location of Genouilly
- Location within France Location within Centre-Val de Loire
- Coordinates: 47°11′31″N 1°53′10″E
- Country: France
- Region: Centre-Val de Loire
- Department: Cher
- Arrondissement: Vierzon
- Canton: Vierzon-2
- Intercommunality: CC Vierzon-Sologne-Berry

Government
  - Mayor (2020–2026): Michel Legendre
- Area^{1}: 34.66 km^{2} (13.38 sq mi)
- Elevation: 153 m (502 ft)
- Highest elevation: 176 m (577 ft)
- Lowest elevation: 99 m (325 ft)
- Population (2023): 657
  - Density: 19.0/km^{2} (49.1/sq mi)
- Time zone: UTC+01:00 (CET)
  - Summer (DST): UTC+02:00 (CEST)
- INSEE/Postal code: 18100 /18310
- ^{1} French Land Register data, which excludes lakes, ponds, glaciers > 1 km^{2} (0.386 sq mi or 247 acres) and river estuaries.

Genouilly (French pronunciation: [ʒənuji]) is a commune in the Cher department in the Centre-Val de Loire region of France.

== Geography ==
Genouilly is a farming area comprising a village and several hamlets situated some 10 miles (16 km) west of Vierzon at the junction of the D108, D19 and D164 roads. The commune borders the departments of Loir-et-Cher and Indre. Three small rivers have their source here: the Prée, the Molène and the Perry.

== Population ==
Historical population
Year	Pop.	±% p.a.
1968	722	—
1975	705	−0.34%
1982	721	+0.32%
1990	762	+0.69%
1999	755	−0.10%
2007	723	−0.54%
2012	702	−0.59%
2017	680	−0.63%
2023	657	−0.57%
Source: INSEE

== See also ==
- Communes of the Cher department
