= Vierzon =

- Subprefecture and commune
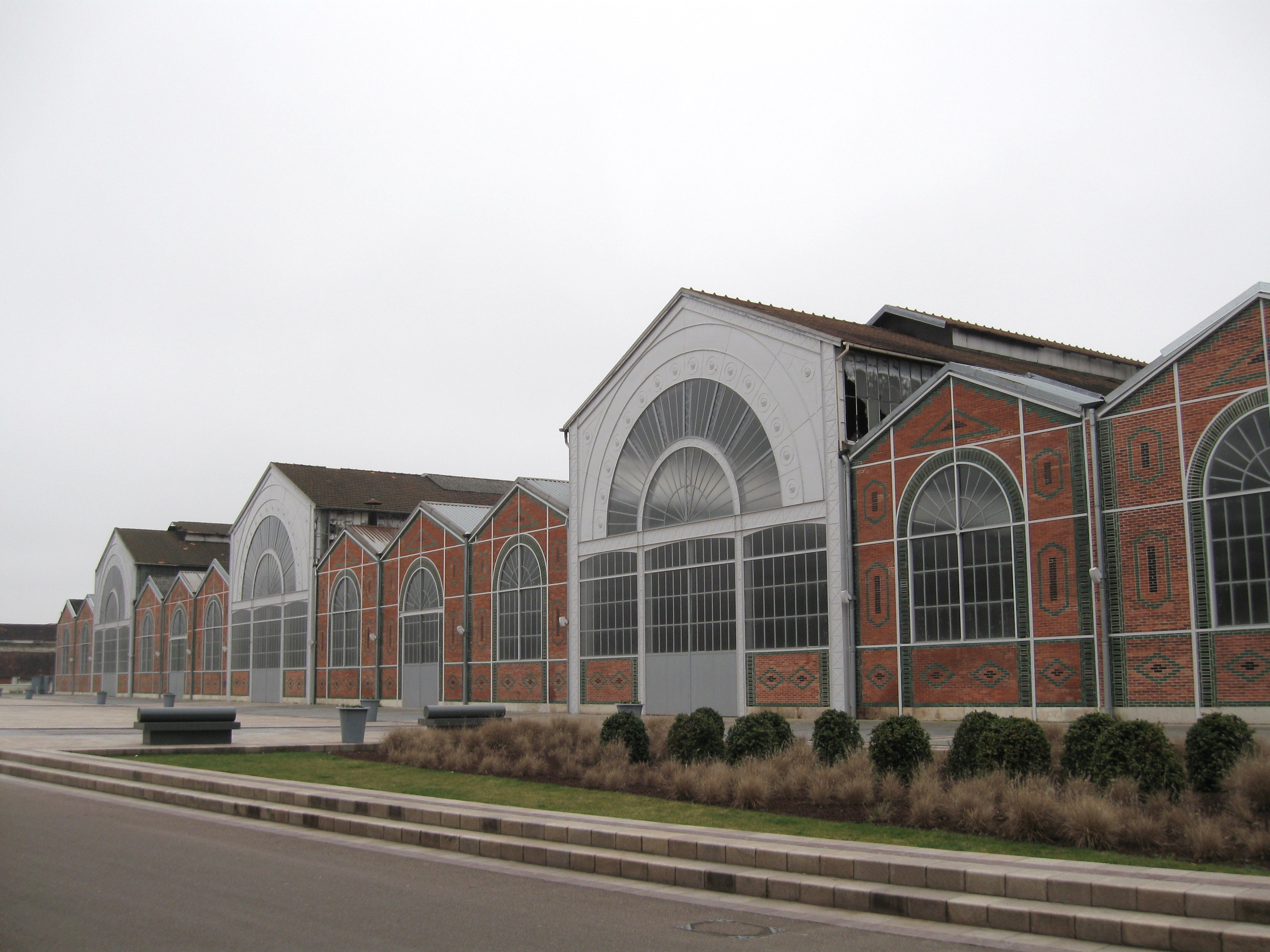
- Factory of the Société Française

- Coat of arms
- Location of Vierzon
- Location within France Location within Centre-Val de Loire
- Coordinates: 47°13′21″N 2°04′10″E
- Country: France
- Region: Centre-Val de Loire
- Department: Cher
- Arrondissement: Vierzon
- Canton: Vierzon-1 and 2
- Intercommunality: CC Vierzon-Sologne-Berry

Government
  - Mayor (2026–32): Yannick Le Roux
- Area^{1}: 74.5 km^{2} (28.8 sq mi)
- Elevation: 102 m (335 ft)
- Highest elevation: 182 m (597 ft)
- Lowest elevation: 94 m (308 ft)
- Population (2023): 25,068
  - Density: 336/km^{2} (871/sq mi)
- Time zone: UTC+01:00 (CET)
  - Summer (DST): UTC+02:00 (CEST)
- INSEE/Postal code: 18279 /18100
- ^{1} French Land Register data, which excludes lakes, ponds, glaciers > 1 km^{2} (0.386 sq mi or 247 acres) and river estuaries.

Vierzon (French pronunciation: [vjɛʁzɔ̃]) is a commune in the French department of Cher, Centre-Val de Loire.

== Geography ==
A medium-sized town by the banks of the river Cher with some light industry and an area of forestry and farming to the north. It is situated some 33 kilometres (21 miles) northwest of Bourges, at the junction of the D2020, D2076 and the D918 roads.

Motorways encircle the town on three sides: the A85 and A71 on the north and east and the A20 on the north and west. Railways reached Vierzon in 1847 and the central SNCF hub Vierzon-Ville station, serving local and nation rail traffic, has been developed here ever since.

== History ==
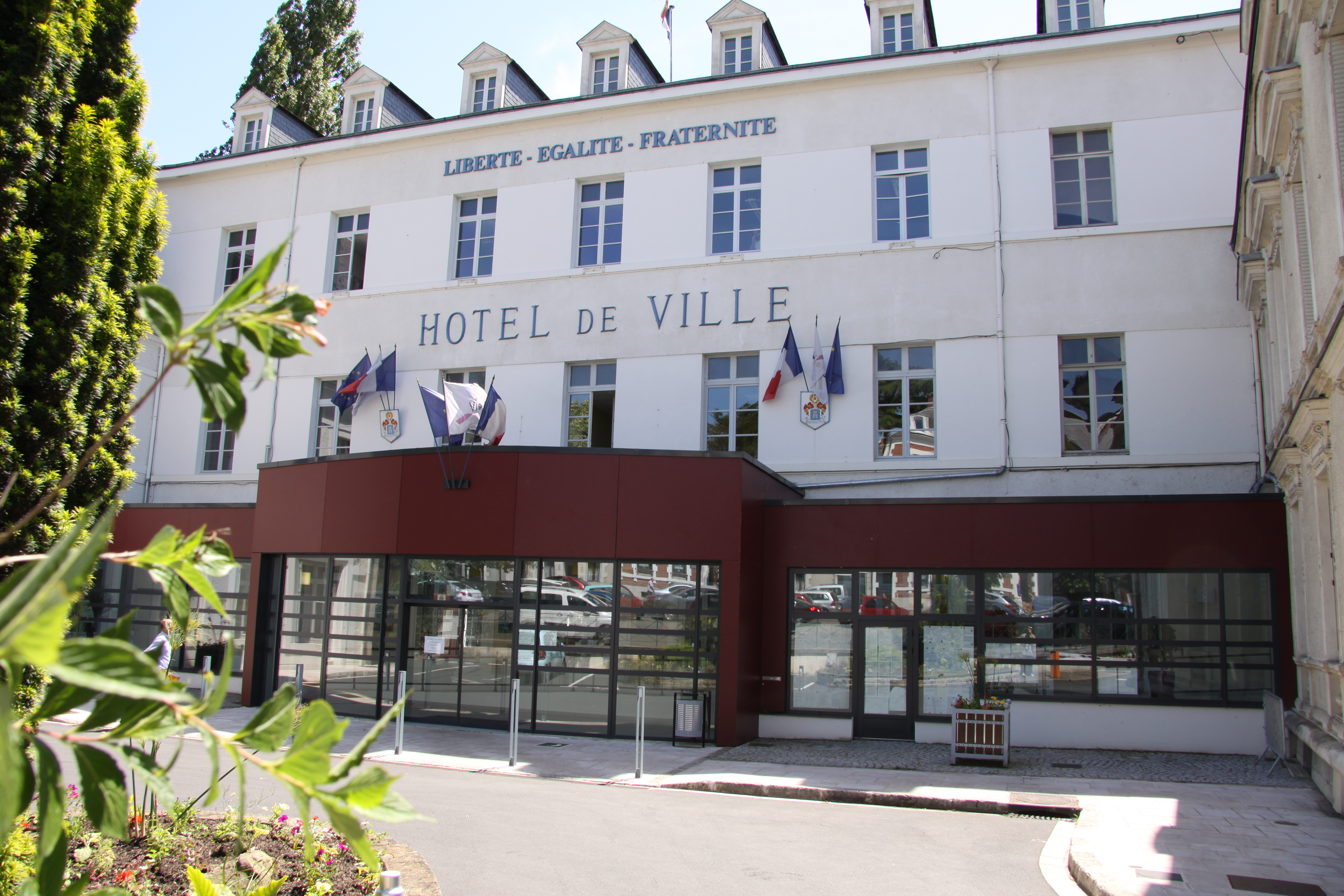
The Hôtel de Ville

Little evidence remains of any pre-Roman occupation, and the Romans themselves didn't leave much trace of their occupation. Not until 926, when a Benedictine monastery was built (on the site of the current Hôtel de Ville) are there any records. The monks came from the abbey of Deuvre, at Saint-Georges-sur-la-Prée, after the abbey was sacked by the Normans in 903. They brought with them the relics of St. Perpetua. These relics were again transferred to the church of Notre-Dame de Vierzon in 1807, where they remain today.

Also in the 10th century, the Normans built a castle atop a feudal motte. They became the seigneurs of Vierzon and the city developed within the western ramparts of the castle.

The Plantagenets, under Richard I Lionheart in 1196, and later Edward, the Black Prince, burned the town and took the castle. Bertrand du Guesclin drove the Plantagenets out in 1370 and restored Vierzon to the crown of France. It became a logistics centre for the armies of Joan of Arc.

Vierzon suffered during the wars of religion, but remained Catholic. The French Revolution of 1789 saw no major shocks except that the parish of Vierzon was divided into two communes: the urban part and the rural (Vierzon-Village), at the request of the rural inhabitants of the parish. The Hôtel de Ville was completed in 1772.

In 1887, the part of town on the southern bank of the river was split into Vierzon-Bourgneuf. In 1937, following a public inquiry and a prefectoral decision, the four municipalities were united as one commune.

Vierzon has not been too troubled by more recent wars. In 1870-1871, a vanguard of Uhlan soldiers marched through the city but withdrew quickly. If Vierzon was spared by the First World War, it was sorely tried during World War II. The Cher river was the border that divided the city into two, the south of the city being in the "Free" French zone whilst the north was in the German-occupied area. In July 1944, a massive Allied bombardment destroyed a large portion of the city.

From the late 18th century until the middle of the twentieth century, the town became industrialised. Iron and steel farming tools were produced here, then glasswork and ceramics and later, agricultural machinery, notably tractors. With the demise of many factories in the town during the 1970s and 1980s, the unemployment rate was very high. This has since been reduced to the national average.

== Population ==
The population data in the table and graph below refer to the commune of Vierzon proper, in its geography at the given years. The commune of Vierzon absorbed the former communes of Vierzon-Village, Vierzon-Bourgneuf and Vierzon-Forges in 1937.

Historical population

Year	Pop.	±% p.a.
1793	4,193	—
1800	3,984	−0.73%
1806	3,887	−0.41%
1821	4,159	+0.45%
1831	4,706	+1.24%
1836	4,980	+1.14%
1841	5,679	+2.66%
1846	6,685	+3.32%
1851	6,730	+0.13%
1856	6,836	+0.31%
1861	7,740	+2.52%
1866	8,224	+1.22%
1872	8,296	+0.15%
1876	8,995	+2.04%
1881	9,969	+2.08%
1886	10,514	+1.07%
1891	10,559	+0.09%
1896	11,392	+1.53%
1901	11,796	+0.70%

Year	Pop.	±% p.a.
1906	12,080	+0.48%
1911	11,856	−0.37%
1921	11,378	−0.41%
1926	11,682	+0.53%
1931	11,314	−0.64%
1936	10,039	−2.36%
1946	26,017	+9.99%
1954	28,627	+1.20%
1962	31,549	+1.22%
1968	33,775	+1.14%
1975	35,699	+0.79%
1982	34,209	−0.61%
1990	32,235	−0.74%
1999	29,719	−0.90%
2007	27,723	−0.87%
2012	27,081	−0.47%
2017	25,903	−0.89%
2023	25,068	−0.54%

Source: EHESS and INSEE (1968-2023)

== Sights ==
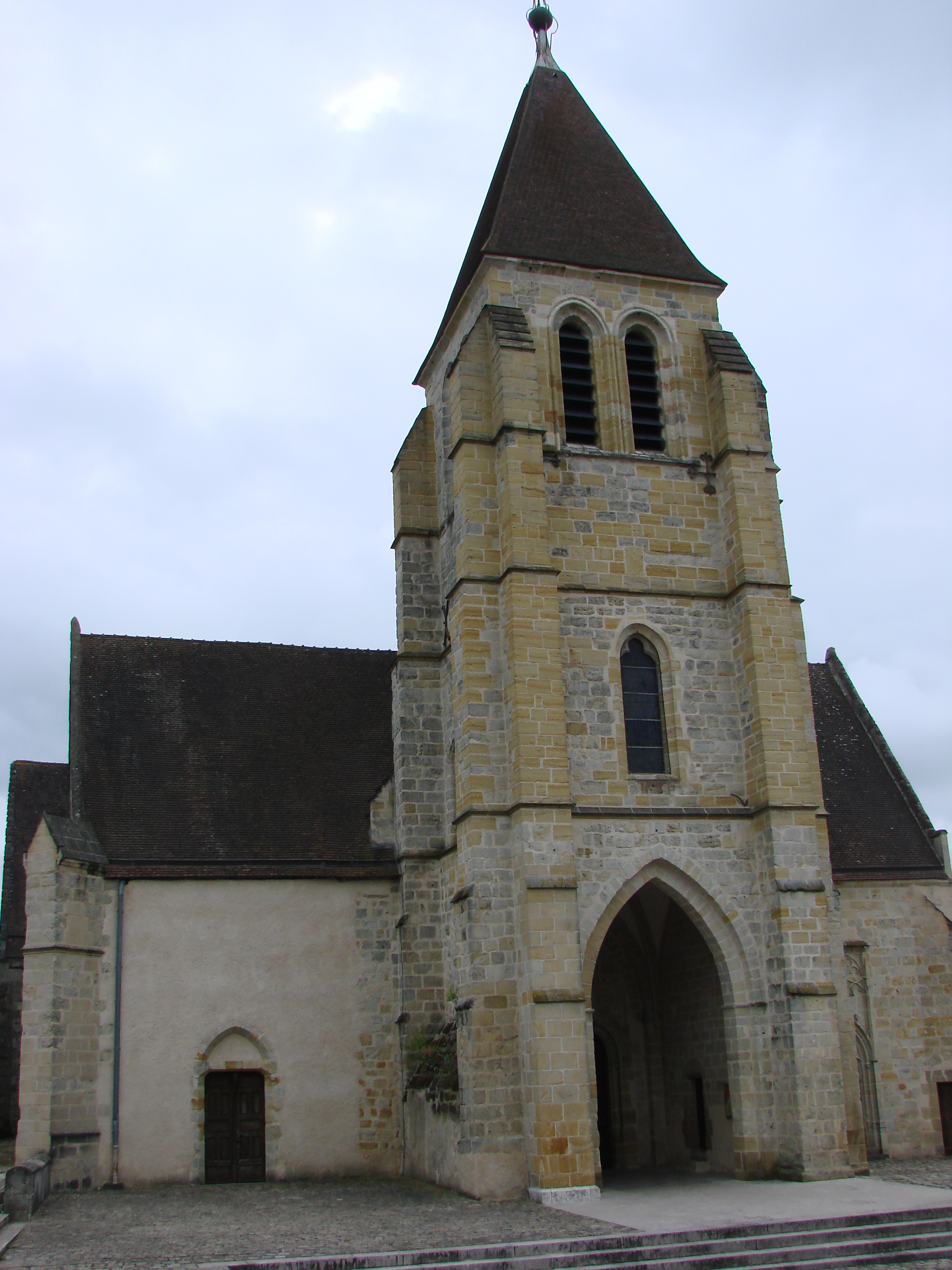
The church of Notre-Dame at Vierzon

- The church dating from the twelfth century.
- The 18th-century château of La Noue.
- The 15th-century château of Chaillot.
- The manorhouse of La Gaillardière.

== Notable people ==
- Félix Pyat (1810–1889), politician and journalist
- Édouard Vaillant (1840–1915), politician
- Eugène Baudin (1853–1918), porcelain worker and left-wing politician
- Jacques Brel (1929–1978), a Belgian singer, mentions Vierzon in his song "Vesoul" (1968)
- Damien Robin (born 1989), professional footballer
- Josman (born 1992), hip-hop artist

== Twin towns – sister cities ==
Vierzon is twinned with:

- Barcelos, Portugal
- Bitterfeld-Wolfen, Germany
- Develi, Turkey
- Dongxihu (Wuhan), China
- Hereford, England, United Kingdom
- El Jadida, Morocco
- Kahale, Lebanon
- Kamienna Góra, Poland
- Miranda de Ebro, Spain
- Rendsburg, Germany
- Sig, Algeria

== Climate ==
Climate data for Vierzon (1991–2010 normals, extremes 1991–2014)
Month	Jan	Feb	Mar	Apr	May	Jun	Jul	Aug	Sep	Oct	Nov	Dec	Year
Record high °C (°F)	17.2 (63.0)	20.6 (69.1)	25.2 (77.4)	30.1 (86.2)	33.7 (92.7)	38.3 (100.9)	37.4 (99.3)	40.4 (104.7)	34.4 (93.9)	28.9 (84.0)	21.9 (71.4)	17.7 (63.9)	40.4 (104.7)
Mean daily maximum °C (°F)	7.2 (45.0)	8.8 (47.8)	12.9 (55.2)	16.0 (60.8)	20.2 (68.4)	23.6 (74.5)	25.9 (78.6)	25.9 (78.6)	21.4 (70.5)	16.6 (61.9)	10.6 (51.1)	7.1 (44.8)	16.4 (61.5)
Daily mean °C (°F)	4.4 (39.9)	5.2 (41.4)	8.4 (47.1)	10.9 (51.6)	15.0 (59.0)	18.2 (64.8)	20.2 (68.4)	20.2 (68.4)	16.2 (61.2)	12.5 (54.5)	7.5 (45.5)	4.5 (40.1)	12.0 (53.6)
Mean daily minimum °C (°F)	1.6 (34.9)	1.6 (34.9)	3.9 (39.0)	5.9 (42.6)	9.7 (49.5)	12.8 (55.0)	14.5 (58.1)	14.4 (57.9)	11.0 (51.8)	8.4 (47.1)	4.4 (39.9)	1.9 (35.4)	7.5 (45.5)
Record low °C (°F)	−11.8 (10.8)	−13.1 (8.4)	−11.4 (11.5)	−2.5 (27.5)	0.2 (32.4)	4.2 (39.6)	6.7 (44.1)	5.0 (41.0)	3.0 (37.4)	−3.8 (25.2)	−9.5 (14.9)	−11.8 (10.8)	−13.1 (8.4)
Average precipitation mm (inches)	65.4 (2.57)	54.7 (2.15)	58.2 (2.29)	68.7 (2.70)	69.0 (2.72)	50.4 (1.98)	63.7 (2.51)	68.3 (2.69)	72.2 (2.84)	74.7 (2.94)	74.7 (2.94)	75.9 (2.99)	795.9 (31.33)
Average precipitation days (≥ 1.0 mm)	11.3	9.9	10.0	10.7	9.5	7.9	8.6	7.8	8.9	10.9	12.2	12.1	119.7
Source: Meteociel

== See also ==
- Communes of the Cher department
