= List of châteaux in Cher =

This article is a non-exhaustive list of the château, located in the French department of Cher in the Centre-Val de Loire region.

There are more than 400 extant châteaux and manors in Cher, not counting hôtels particuliers. The communes with the most châteaux are Presly (11), Bourges (8), Nançay (8), Brinon-sur-Sauldre (7) and Saint-Éloy-de-Gy (6). The most famous are the Château de Meillant, the Château d'Ainay-le-Vieil, the Château de la Verrerie and the Château de Culan.

== List of châteaux ==
Commune	Name	Ownership	Destination	Image
Ainay-le-Vieil	Château d'Ainay-le-Vieil	Private	Open to visitors	
Les Aix-d'Angillon	Donjon du château des Aix-d'Angillon	Private		
Les Aix-d'Angillon	Château de la Chaumelle	Private		
Allogny	Château de Beauchêne	Private	Visitor accommodations	
Allogny	Château de La Cour	Private		
Allogny	Château des Fougères	Private		
Allouis	Château des Fontaines	Private		
Annoix	Château de Feularde	Private		
Apremont-sur-Allier	Château d'Apremont, Cher	Private	Open to visitors	
Apremont-sur-Allier	Château du Veuillin	Private		
Arçay, Cher	Château de Belair	Private	Visitor accommodations	
Arcomps	Château de La Touratte	Private		
Argent-sur-Sauldre	Château les Guyots	Private		
Argent-sur-Sauldre	Château les Ribottets	Private		
Argent-sur-Sauldre	Château de Saint-Maur (Argent-sur-Sauldre)	commune of Argent-sur-Sauldre	Open to visitors	
Argent-sur-Sauldre	Château de la Tuilerie	Private		
Argenvières	Château de la Charnaye	Private		
Argenvières	Château des Rauches	Private		
Assigny, Cher	Château de La Vallée	Private	Visitor accommodations	
Aubigny-sur-Nère	Château des Stuarts	commune of Aubigny-sur-Nère	Open to visitors	
Aubinges	Château Breton	Private		
Aubinges	Château de Lusson	Private		
Augy-sur-Aubois	Château de Vesvre	Private		
Avord	Château de Soutrin	Private		
Bannay, Cher	Château de Bannay	Private		
Bannegon	Château de Bannegon	Private	Events	
Baugy, Cher	Château de Baugy	commune of Baugy	Remains	
Baugy, Cher	Château de Laverdines	Private		
Beffes	Château de Beffes	Private		
Beffes	Motte féodale du Boisfort	Private		
Bengy-sur-Craon	Château de Préfond	Private	Visitor accommodations	
Bessais-le-Fromental	Château des Barres	Private		
Bessais-le-Fromental	Château vieux des Barres	Private		
Bessais-le-Fromental	Château de Bernon	Private		
Bessais-le-Fromental	Château de Bonneau	Private		
Blancafort, Cher	Château de Blancafort	Private	Open to visitors	
Blancafort, Cher	Château de l'Hospital-du-Fresne	Private		
Blet	Château de Blet	Private	Visitor accommodations and receptions	
Blet	Château des Brosses	Private		
Boulleret	Château de Buranlure	Private	Events	
Boulleret	Château du Pezeau	Private		
Bourges	Manoir du Beugnon	Private		
Bourges	Château de Chappe	Private		
Bourges	Château des Gadeaux	Jacques Coeur hospital of Bourges	Hospital	
Bourges	Château de Germigny	Private		
Bourges	Jacques Cœur's Palace	French State	Open to visitors	
Bourges	Château de Lazenay	Private	Visitor accommodations	
Bourges	Château vieux de Lazenay	commune of Bourges		
Bourges	Château de Vouzay	département du Cher	Medical school	
Brécy, Cher	Château de Brécy, Cher	Private		
Brécy, Cher	Château de Guilly	Private		
Brinay, Cher	Château d'Aubussay	Private		
Brinay, Cher	Château de Brinay	Private	Visitor accommodations	
Brinay, Cher	Château de la Brosse	Private	Visitor accommodations	
Brinon-sur-Sauldre	Château du Bois Chaumont	Private		
Brinon-sur-Sauldre	Château des Bordes	Private		
Brinon-sur-Sauldre	Château des Bouffards	Private	Visitor accommodations	
Brinon-sur-Sauldre	Château de Brinon-sur-Sauldre	Private		
Brinon-sur-Sauldre	Château du Coudray	Private		
Brinon-sur-Sauldre	Château de Lhuys	Private		
Brinon-sur-Sauldre	Château de la Minée	Private		
Bruère-Allichamps	Château de Châteaufer	Private		
Bussy, Cher	Château de Bussy	Private		
Bussy, Cher	Château de Malçay	Private		
Bussy, Cher	Château de la Vèvre	Private		
Cerbois	Château de Cerbois	Private		
La Celle-Condé	Château du Plessis	Private		
Chalivoy-Milon	Château d'Yssertieux	Private		
La Chapelle-d'Angillon	Château de Béthune	Private	Open to visitors	
La Chapelle-d'Angillon	Château des Gillons	Private		
La Chapelle-Hugon	Château des Bordes	Private		
La Chapelle-Montlinard	Château Gaillard	Private		
La Chapelle-Montlinard	Château de la Chapelle	Private		
Charenton-du-Cher	Château La Planche	Private		
Charentonnay	Château de Charentonnay	Private		
Charentonnay	Château des Trois Brioux	Private		
Charly, Cher	Château Charly	Private	Visitor accommodations	
Charly, Cher	Château de Pierry	Private		
Charly, Cher	Château de Vilaine	Private		
Chârost	Château de Chârost	Private		
Chassy, Cher	Château de Villiers	Private		
Châteaumeillant	Château de Châteaumeillant	département du Cher	Retirement home	
Châteaumeillant	Château de Grammont	Private		
Châteauneuf-sur-Cher	Château de Châteauneuf-sur-Cher	Private	Open to visitors	
Le Châtelet	Château du Châtelet	Private		
Le Châtelet	Château des Estiveaux	Private		
Le Châtelet	Château de la Vieille Forêt	Private		
Chaumoux-Marcilly	Château de Marcilly	Private		
Le Chautay	Château de Bernay	Private		
Le Chautay	Château des Réaux	Private	Visitor accommodations	
Chéry	Château de Maurepas	Private		
Chezal-Benoît	Château de la Bruyère	Private		
Chezal-Benoît	Château de la Croisette	Private		
Chezal-Benoît	Château du Plaix	Private		
Civray, Cher	Château du Coudray	Private		
Clémont	Château de la Bourdinière	Private		
Clémont	Château de Lauroy	Private		
Clémont	Château des Nérots	Private		
Colombiers, Cher	Château de la Salle	Private		
Concressault	Château de la Jonchère	Private		
Contres, Cher	Château de Contres	Private		
Cornusse	Château des Templiers	Private		
Cours-les-Barres	Château du Lieu	Private		
Coust	Château de Bonnais	Private		
Coust	Château du Creuzet	Private		
Coust	Château de Meslon	Private		
Crézancy-en-Sancerre	Château de Crézancy-en-Sancerre	Private	Winery	
Crézancy-en-Sancerre	Château de Vauvredon	Private	Visitor accommodations	
Crosses	Château de Crosses	Private		
Cuffy	Château de Cuffy	Private		
Cuffy	Château de Maison Nouvelle	Private		
Culan	Château de Culan	Private	Open to visitors	
Dun-sur-Auron	Château de Dun-sur-Auron	commune of Dun-sur-Auron		
Dun-sur-Auron	Château de la Périsse	Private		
Dun-sur-Auron	Château de Terland	Private		
Ennordres	Château des Brassins	Private		
Ennordres	Château de La Brossette	Private	Visitor accommodations	
Ennordres	Château de l'Echeneau	Private		
Ennordres	Château de La Motte	Private		
Ennordres	Château des Thourys	Private		
Épineuil-le-Fleuriel	Château de Cornançay	Private		
Épineuil-le-Fleuriel	Motte féodale d'Epineuil-le-Fleuriel	Private		
Étréchy, Cher	Château d'Astilly	Private		
Étréchy, Cher	Château du Grand Manay	Private		
Farges-Allichamps	Château de la Brosse	Private		
Farges-Allichamps	Château de Farges	Private		
Farges-en-Septaine	Château d'Augy	Private		
Farges-en-Septaine	Château de Bois-Bouzon	Private		
Faverdines	Maison forte de Chaudenay	Private		
Flavigny, Cher	Château de Bar-Bonnebûche	Private	Visitor accommodations	
Foëcy	Château de Foëcy	Private		
Foëcy	Château de Nourioux	Private		
Fussy	Château du bourg	Private		
Fussy	Château de Contremoret	Private		
Fussy	Château de Feularde	Private		
Garigny	Château de Doys	Private		
Garigny	Château de Vauvrille	Private		
Genouilly, Cher	Château de la Maisonfort	Private		
Germigny-l'Exempt	Château Gaillard	Private		
Germigny-l'Exempt	Château-Renaud	Private	Open to visitors	
Givardon	Château d'Allardes	Private		
Graçay	Château de Coulon	Private		
Gron, Cher	Château	Private		
Gron, Cher	Château du Coupoy	Private		
Grossouvre	Château de Grossouvre	Private		
La Guerche-sur-l'Aubois	Manoir de Chezelles	Private		
La Guerche-sur-l'Aubois	Château du Gravier	Private		
La Guerche-sur-l'Aubois	Château de l'Hôtel de Ville	commune of la Guerche-sur-l'Aubois	Town hall	
La Guerche-sur-l'Aubois	Château de la Salle	Private		
Herry	Château de la Bourgeoisie	Private		
Herry	Château de Chalivoy	Private		
Herry	Château d'Herry	Private		
Humbligny	Château d'Humbligny	Private		
Ignol	Château de la Cartonnerie	Private		
Ineuil	Château du Pavillon	Private	Maternity center	
Ivoy-le-Pré	Château de la Cour	Private		
Ivoy-le-Pré	Château des Fontaines	Private		
Ivoy-le-Pré	Château d'Ivoy-le-Pré	Private	Visitor accommodations	
Ivoy-le-Pré	Château de Moison	Private	Visitor accommodations	
Ivoy-le-Pré	Château de la Retraite	Private		
Jalognes	Château de Pesselières	Private	Open to visitors	
Jars	Château de Jars	Private		
Jars	Château de Nancray	Private		
Jussy-Champagne	Château de Jussy	Private	Open to visitors	
Jussy-le-Chaudrier	Château des Bordes	Private		
Lantan	Château de la Chaume	Private	Visitor accommodations	
Lantan	Château de Singleton	Private		
Lazenay	Communs du Château de la Ferté (Indre)	Private		
Lazenay	Château de Lazenay	Private		
Léré, Cher	Château de Villattes	Private		
Levet, Cher	Château de Soulangy	Private		
Lignières, Cher	Château de Lignières, Cher	Private		
Lignières, Cher	Château du Plessis	Private		
Limeux, Cher	Château de Saragosse	Private		
Loye-sur-Arnon	Château de Drulon	Private		
Loye-sur-Arnon	Manoir des Girouettes	Private		
Lugny-Champagne	Château de Lugny	Private		
Lugny-Champagne	Château de Billeron	Private		
Lunery	Château de Champroy	Private		
Lunery	Château des Rimberts	Private		
Lunery	Château de Rosières	Private		
Lury-sur-Arnon	Château du Chaillou	Private		
Lury-sur-Arnon	Château de Coulange	Private		
Lury-sur-Arnon	Château de Ferrandeau	Private		
Lury-sur-Arnon	Château de Guérigny	Private		
Lury-sur-Arnon	Château du Petit-Chambord	Private		
Marçais	Château des Sizières	Private		
Marçais	Château de la Mothe	Private		
Mareuil-sur-Arnon	Château	Private		
Marmagne, Cher	Château de Beauvoir	Private		
Marmagne, Cher	Château	Private		
Marseilles-lès-Aubigny	Château d'Aubigny	Private		
Marseilles-lès-Aubigny	Château Vert	Private	Visitor accommodations	
Massay	Château de la Motte d'Hyors	Private		
Massay	Château de Gy	Private		
Massay	Château du Ponthereau	Private	Visitor accommodations	
Mehun-sur-Yèvre	Château de Mehun-sur-Yèvre	commune of Mehun-sur-Yèvre	Open to visitors	
Meillant	Château de Meillant	Private	Open to visitors	
Menetou-Couture	Château de Menetou-Couture	Private	Open to visitors	
Menetou-Râtel	Château de Couët	Private		
Menetou-Salon	Château de Menetou-Salon	Private	Open to visitors	
Ménétréol-sous-Sancerre		Private		
Ménétréol-sur-Sauldre	Châteaux de la Faye	Private	Visitor accommodations	
Ménétréol-sur-Sauldre	Châteaux de Landeroyne	Private		
Ménétréol-sur-Sauldre	Châteaux de Simouët	Private		
Méreau	Château d'Autry	Private		
Méreau	Château le Briou d'Autry	Private	Visitor accommodations	
Méreau	Château de Chevilly	Private		
Méreau	Château de Madrolle	Private		
Méreau	Château des Murs	Private		
Méry-ès-Bois	Château des Patineaux	Private		
Méry-ès-Bois	Château des Tureaux	Private		
Méry-sur-Cher	Château de la Bruère	Private		
Méry-sur-Cher	Château de la Forêt	Private		
Méry-sur-Cher	Château de Méry-sur-Cher	Private		
Montlouis	Maison de Varennes	Private	Visitor accommodations	
Montlouis	Château de Villiers	Private		
Montigny, Cher	Château de la Charnaye	Private		
Morlac	Château du Grand Lomoy	Private		
Mornay-Berry	Maison forte de Mornay	Private	Open to visitors	
Mornay-sur-Allier	Château de Bel Air	Private		
Morogues	Château de Loye			
Morogues	Château de Maupas (Morogues)	Private	Open to visitors	
Morthomiers	Château de Prunay	Private		
Moulins-sur-Yèvre	Château de Chou	Private		
Moulins-sur-Yèvre	Château de Maubranche	Private	Open to visitors	
Nançay	Château des Aubiers	Private		
Nançay	Château du Bas Boulay	Private		
Nançay	Château du Haut Boulay	Private		
Nançay	Château de Loince	Private		
Nançay	Château de Nançay	Private	Open to visitors	
Nançay	Château des Varennes	Private		
Nançay	Château de Vieux Nancay	Private		
Nançay	Château de Voisine	Private		
Nérondes	Château de Verrières	Private		
Nérondes	Château du Briou	Private		
Neuilly-en-Dun	Château les Héraults	Private		
Neuilly-en-Dun	Château de Laumoy	Private		
Neuilly-en-Dun	Château de Liénesse	Private		
Neuilly-en-Sancerre	Château de La Croix	Private		
Neuilly-en-Sancerre	Château vieux	Private		
Neuvy-sur-Barangeon	Château de Saint-Hubert	Private		
Neuvy-sur-Barangeon	Château du Chalet de la Croix	Private	Visitor accommodations	
Neuvy-sur-Barangeon	Château de Jeu	Private		
Neuvy-sur-Barangeon	Château de la Petite Chabotière	Private		
Neuvy-le-Barrois	Château de Neuvy-le-Barrois	Private		
Neuvy-le-Barrois	Château de Pée	Private		
Neuvy-Deux-Clochers	Ensemble castral de Vèvre	commune of Neuvy-Deux-Clochers	Open to visitors	
Nohant-en-Goût	Château de Puy Verday	Private		
Nohant-en-Goût	Château du Préau	Private		
Nohant-en-Graçay	Château du Chêne	Private	Visitor accommodations	
Nohant-en-Graçay	Château de Longchamps	Private	Events	
Le Noyer, Cher	Château de Boucard	Private		
Nozières, Cher	Château de la Férolle	Private		
Oizon	Château des Cherriers	Private		
Oizon	Château de l'Oizenotte	Private		
Oizon	Château de Ragis	Private		
Oizon	Château de La Verrerie, Cher	Private	Open to visitors	
Orcenais	Château de la Grange	Private		
Osmery	Château des Bergeries	Private		
Osmery	Château de Deffens	Private		
Osmery	Château du Domaine	Private		
Osmoy, Cher	Château de Boisjardin	Private		
Ourouer-les-Bourdelins	Château de Chalivoy-la-Noix	Private	Visitor accommodations	
Ourouer-les-Bourdelins	Château d'Ourouer	Private		
Parassy	Château de Parassy	Private		
La Perche	Château de Beuvron	Private		
La Perche	Château d'Igny	Private	Visitor accommodations	
Pigny	Château de Boisbriou	Private	Visitor accommodations	
Pigny	Manoir de Pigny	Private		
Pigny	Château au nord de Pigny	Private		
Plou	Château de Castelnau	Private		
Plou	Château de Font Moreau	Private		
Poisieux	Château de Mazières	Private		
Le Pondy	Château du Pondy	Private		
Précy	Château du Blaudy	Private	Retirement home	
Presly	Château des Beaudeaux	Private		
Presly	Château des Brandes	Private		
Presly	Château de la Devinière	Private		
Presly	Château de Fonsbelle	Private		
Presly	Château de Mauzé	Private		
Presly	Château de Préfonds	Private		
Presly	Château des Prés	Private		
Presly	Château du Reuilly	Private		
Presly	Château des Rhodons	Private		
Presly	Château de Sommerère	Private		
Presly	Château de la Planche	Private		
Preuilly, Cher	Château des Thureaux	Private		
Préveranges	Château du Boueix	Private		
Préveranges	Château de la Preugne	Private		
Primelles	Château de la Motte Turlin	Private		
Quantilly	Château de Champgrand	Private		
Quantilly	Château de Quantilly	Private		
Quincy, Cher	Château de Quincy	Private		
Rezay	Château de Beaulieu	Private		
Rians, Cher	Château de Séry	Private		
Sagonne	Château de la Motte Beraud	Private	Open to visitors	
Sagonne	Château de Sagonne	Private	Open to visitors	
Saint-Amand-Montrond	Château de la Férolle	Private		
Saint-Amand-Montrond	Château de Montrond (Saint-Amand-Montrond)	commune of Saint-Amand-Montrond	Open to visitors	
Saint-Ambroix, Cher	Château de La Foye	Private		
Saint-Ambroix, Cher	Château de Neuville	Private		
Saint-Ambroix, Cher	Château des Peluyes	Private		
Saint-Baudel	Château de Colombe	Private		
Saint-Bouize	Château de Lagrange-Montalivet	Private		
Saint-Bouize	Château des Roches	Private		
Saint-Céols	Château de Saint Céols	Private		
Saint-Christophe-le-Chaudry	Château de la Forêt Grailly	Private		
Saint-Denis-de-Palin	Château de Villaine	Private		
Saint-Doulchard	Château de Varye	commune of Saint-Doulchard	Cultural center	
Saint-Éloy-de-Gy	Château de Chapelutte	Private		
Saint-Éloy-de-Gy	Château de Dame	Private		
Saint-Éloy-de-Gy	Château de L'Epinière	Private		
Saint-Éloy-de-Gy	Château du Montet	Private		
Saint-Éloy-de-Gy	Château du Perron	Private		
Saint-Éloy-de-Gy	Château du Vernay	Private		
Saint-Florent-sur-Cher	Château du Châtelier	Private	Medical school	
Saint-Florent-sur-Cher	Château de la Forest	Private		
Saint-Florent-sur-Cher	Château de Saint-Florent-sur-Cher	commune of Saint-Florent-sur-Cher	Town hall	
Saint-Georges-de-Poisieux	Château des Epourneaux	Private		
Saint-Georges-de-Poisieux	Château de Poisieux	Private		
Saint-Georges-sur-Moulon	Château de Saint-Georges	Private	Visitor accommodations	
Saint-Georges-sur-la-Prée	Château de Rozay	Private		
Saint-Germain-du-Puy	Château de Villemenard	Private	Events	
Saint-Hilaire-de-Court	Château de la Beuvrière	Private	Events	
Saint-Hilaire-de-Court	Château de la Chaponnière	Private		
Saint-Hilaire-en-Lignières	Château du Plaix	Private	Open to visitors	
Saint-Jeanvrin	Château du Petit Besse	Private		
Saint-Jeanvrin	Château de Saint-Jeanvrin	Private		
Saint-Just, Cher	Château de Bois Vert	Private		
Saint-Just, Cher	Château de Chambon	Private		
Saint-Laurent, Cher	Château de Mamets	Private		
Saint-Laurent, Cher	Château de l'Ormoy	Private		
Saint-Léger-le-Petit	Château de Saint-Léger	Private		
Saint-Loup-des-Chaumes	Château de Pregiraud	Private	Visitor accommodations	
Saint-Loup-des-Chaumes	Château de Rousson	Private		
Saint-Maur, Cher	Château du Grand-Besse	Private		
Saint-Michel-de-Volangis	Château	Private		
Saint-Michel-de-Volangis	Château de Turly	Private		
Saint-Palais, Cher	Château des Archevêques	Private		
Saint-Pierre-les-Bois	Château de Bagneux	Private		
Saint-Pierre-les-Bois	Château du Carroir	Private		
Saint-Pierre-les-Bois	Château de la Ronde	Private		
Saint-Pierre-les-Étieux	Château de Saint Pierre	Private	Visitor accommodations	
Saint-Priest-la-Marche	Château de la Courcelle	Private		
Saint-Vitte	Château de Souligny	Private		
Sainte-Gemme-en-Sancerrois	Château de Nozay	Private	Winery	
Sainte-Montaine	Château des Cheneaux	Private		
Sainte-Montaine	Château des Rousseaux	Private		
Sainte-Montaine	Château de la Talle	Private		
Sainte-Solange	Château de la Jonchère	Private		
Sainte-Solange	Château de Mazières	Private	Visitor accommodations	
Sainte-Solange	Château de Villecomte	Private	Visitor accommodations	
Sainte-Thorette	Château de Careil	Private		
Sancergues	Château d'Augy	Pierre Lôo hospital in Charité-sur-Loire	Psycho-Social Rehabilitation Center	
Sancergues	Château de Sarré	Private		
Sancerre	Château de l’Étang	Private		
Sancerre	Château de Sancerre	Private	Open to visitors	
Sancoins	Donjon de Jouy	Private	Open to visitors	
Santranges	Château	Private		
Santranges	Château du Vernet	Private		
Saulzais-le-Potier	Château de la Lande	Private		
Saulzais-le-Potier	Château des Mazières	Private		
Sens-Beaujeu	Château de Beaujeu, Cher	Private	Events	
Serruelles	Château de Lambussay	Private		
Soye-en-Septaine	Château de Soye	Private		
Le Subdray	Château du Sollier	Private		
Subligny, Cher	Château de la Boulaye	Private		
Sury-en-Vaux	Château de Sury-en-Vaux	Private		
Tendron	Château de Fontenay	Private	Visitor accommodations	
Thaumiers	Château de la Forêt	Private		
Thauvenay	Château de Thauvenay	Private	Winery	
Thénioux	Château de la Brosse	Private	Visitor accommodations	
Touchay	Château de l'Isle-sur-Arnon	Private		
Torteron	Château de Milly	Private		
Trouy	Château du Grand Lac	Private		
Trouy	Château Rozé	commune of Trouy	Town hall	
Vailly-sur-Sauldre	Château des Roches	Private		
Vailly-sur-Sauldre	Château de Vailly-sur-Sauldre	Private		
Vailly-sur-Sauldre	Château de la Thumb	Private		
Vallenay	Château de Bigny	Private		
Vallenay	Château de Preuil	Private	Visitor accommodations	
Vallenay	Château de Vallenay	Private		
Vasselay	Château des Bertins	Private		
Vasselay	Château de la Brosse	Private		
Vasselay	Château de Puyvallée	Private		
Veaugues	Château des Porteaux	Private		
Venesmes	Château d'Aigue-Morte	Private		
Venesmes	Château des Vaslins	Private		
Vereaux	Château du Pavillon	Private		
Verneuil, Cher	Château de Torchefoulon	Private		
Vesdun	Château de la Cour	Private		
Vesdun	Château de Frappon	Private		
Vesdun	Château de la Rouhanne	Private		
Vierzon	Château de Chaillot	Private		
Vierzon	Château de Fay	Private		
Vierzon	Manoir de la Gaillardière	Private		
Vierzon	Château de la Noue	Vierzon Hospital		
Vierzon	Château de Vierzon	commune of Vierzon		
Vignoux-sous-les-Aix	Château de Bois Rogneux	Private		
Vignoux-sur-Barangeon	Château de Blosset	Private		
Vignoux-sur-Barangeon	Château de Villemenard	Private		
Villabon	Château de Savoye	Private		
Villegenon	Château de la Croslaie	Private		
Villegenon	Château de Villegenon	Private		
Villeneuve-sur-Cher	Château Les Breux	Private		
Villeneuve-sur-Cher	Château de Galifard	Private		
Villeneuve-sur-Cher	Château de Moulin Neuf	Private		
Villeneuve-sur-Cher	Château de Villeneuve	Private		
Villequiers	Château du Colombier	Private		
Villequiers	Château de Villequiers	Private		
Vinon	Château de Vaufreland	Private		
Vinon	Château de Vinon	Private		
Vorly	Château de Bois-Sire-Amé	Private		
Vorly	Château de Mangoux	Private		
Vornay	Château de Soupize	Private		
Vouzeron	Château de Vouzeron	Private		

== See also ==
- List of châteaux in Centre-Val de Loire
- List of châteaux in France
- List of castles in France
