= Canton of La Chapelle-d'Angillon =

Coordinates: 47°21′51″N 2°26′2″E

La Chapelle-d'Angillon
- Former canton
- Interactive map of La Chapelle-d'Angillon
- Country: France
- Region: Centre-Val de Loire
- Department: Cher
- No. of communes: {{{nbcomm}}}
- Disbanded: 2015
- Area: 338.92 km^{2} (130.86 sq mi)
- Population (2012): 2,573
  - Density: 7.592/km^{2} (19.66/sq mi)

The Canton of La Chapelle-d'Angillon is a canton situated in the Cher département and in the Centre region of France. It was disbanded following the French canton reorganisation which came into effect in March 2015. It consisted of 5 communes, which joined the canton of Aubigny-sur-Nère in 2015. It had 2,573 inhabitants (2012).

== Geography ==
An area of forestry and farming in the valley of the river Sauldre, in the northeastern part of the arrondissement of Vierzon, centred on the town of La Chapelle-d'Angillon. The altitude varies from 137m at Presly to 355m at Ivoy-le-Pré, with an average altitude of 233m.

The canton comprised 5 communes:

- La Chapelle-d'Angillon
- Ennordres
- Ivoy-le-Pré
- Méry-ès-Bois
- Presly

== Population ==
Historical population Canton of La Chapelle-d'Angillon
Year	1962	1968	1975	1982	1990	1999
Pop.	2,939	3,314	2,916	3,162	2,599	2,617
±%	—	+12.8%	−12.0%	+8.4%	−17.8%	+0.7%
From the year 1962 on: No double counting – residents of multiple communes (e.g. students and military personnel) are counted only once. Source: INSEE

== See also ==
- Arrondissements of the Cher department
- Cantons of the Cher department
- Communes of the Cher department
