= Canton of Argent-sur-Sauldre =

Coordinates: 47°33′27″N 2°26′37″E

Argent-sur-Sauldre
- Former canton
- Interactive map of Argent-sur-Sauldre
- Country: France
- Region: Centre-Val de Loire
- Department: Cher
- No. of communes: {{{nbcomm}}}
- Disbanded: 2015
- Area: 298.11 km^{2} (115.10 sq mi)
- Population (2012): 5,018
  - Density: 16.83/km^{2} (43.60/sq mi)

The Canton of Argent-sur-Sauldre is a former canton situated in the Cher département and in the Centre region of France. It was disbanded following the French canton reorganisation which came into effect in March 2015. It consisted of 4 communes, which joined the canton of Aubigny-sur-Nère in 2015. It had 5,018 inhabitants (2012).

== Composition ==
The canton comprised 4 communes:

- Argent-sur-Sauldre
- Blancafort
- Brinon-sur-Sauldre
- Clémont

== Population ==
Historical population Canton of Argent-sur-Sauldre
Year	1962	1968	1975	1982	1990	1999
Pop.	5,330	5,623	5,631	5,606	5,254	5,228
±%	—	+5.5%	+0.1%	−0.4%	−6.3%	−0.5%
From the year 1962 on: No double counting – residents of multiple communes (e.g. students and military personnel) are counted only once. Source: INSEE

== See also ==
- Arrondissements of the Cher department
- Cantons of the Cher department
- Communes of the Cher department
