= Nicolas Leblanc =

French chemist and surgeon (1742–1806)

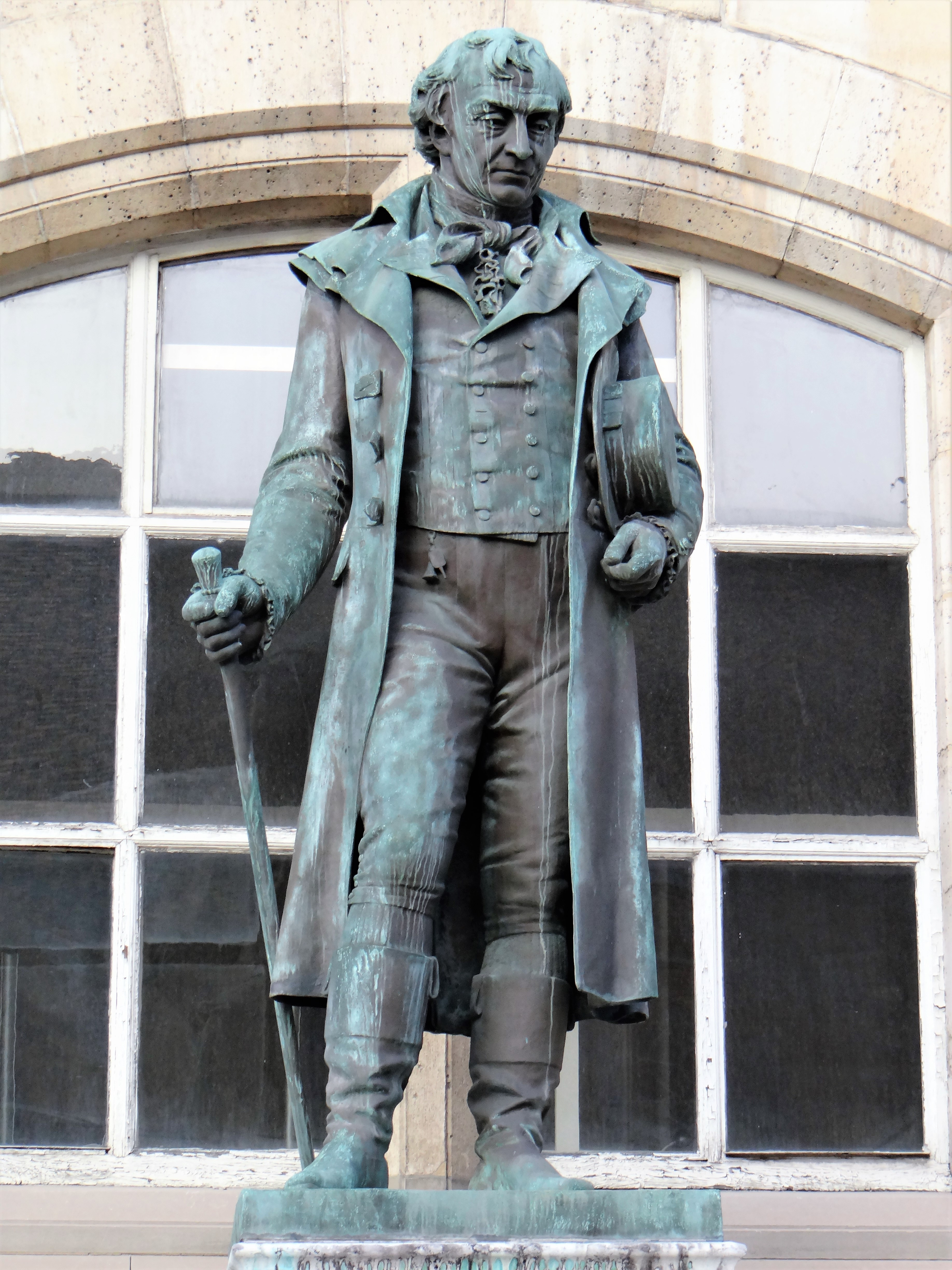
- Nicolas Leblanc chemist & physician
- Born: December 6, 1742; Ivoy-le-Pré, France
- Died: January 16, 1806 (aged 63); Paris, France
- Known for: soda common salt
- Scientific career
- Fields: chemistry physics

Nicolas Leblanc (French pronunciation: [nikɔla ləblɑ̃]; December 6, 1742 – January 16, 1806) was a French chemist and surgeon who discovered how to manufacture soda ash from common salt.

== Earlier days ==
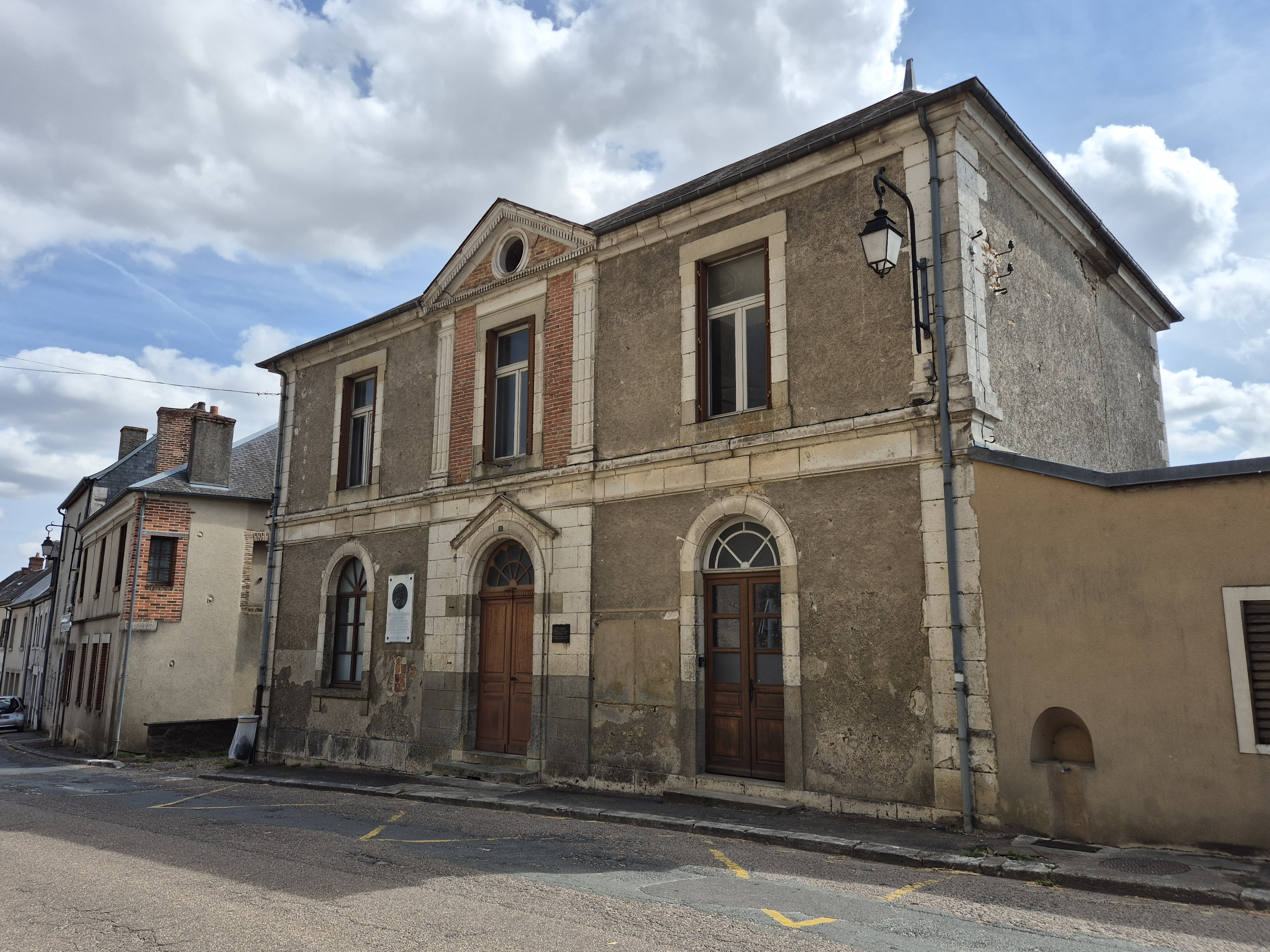
Birthhouse

Leblanc was born in Ivoy le Pré, Cher, France on 6 December 1742. His father, a minor official at an iron works, died in 1751. Leblanc was sent to Bourges to live with Dr. Bien, a close family friend. Under the influence of his guardian, Leblanc developed an interest in medicine. When Bien died in 1759, Leblanc enrolled at the École de Chirurgie (College of Surgeons) in Paris to study medicine.

Graduating with a master's degree in surgery, Leblanc opened a medical practice. He married in 1776, and the couple's first child followed three years later. Unable to provide adequately for his family on the medical fees he obtained from his patients, Leblanc in 1780 accepted a position as the private physician to the household of the Louis Philip II, Duke of Orléans.

== The Leblanc process ==
In 1775, the French Academy of Sciences offered a prize for a process whereby soda ash could be produced from salt. The French Academy wanted to promote the production of much-needed sodium carbonate from inexpensive sodium chloride.

By 1791, Nicolas Leblanc had succeeded in producing sodium carbonate from salt by a 2-step process. In the first step, sodium chloride is mixed with concentrated sulfuric acid at temperatures of 800–900 °C; hydrogen chloride gas is evolved, leaving solid sodium sulfate. In the second step, the sodium sulfate is crushed, mixed with charcoal and limestone and again heated in a furnace.

The prize was awarded to Nicolas Leblanc for a process which used sea salt and sulfuric acid as the raw materials. Later a plant (of his own) was in operation producing 320 tons of soda ash per year. The process, however, is now obsolete and is superseded by the Solvay process.

== Final days ==
Two years later the plant was confiscated by the French revolutionary government, which refused to pay him the prize money he had earned ten years earlier.

In 1802 Napoleon returned the plant (but not the prize) to him, but by then Leblanc could not afford to run it. He committed suicide by a gunshot to the head in 1806.

== Legacy ==
William Losh visited Paris to study Leblanc's process. In 1807, Losh, Wilson and Bell opened the first alkali works in England that used the Leblanc process, at Walker, Newcastle upon Tyne.

== Sources ==
- Novelguide

== Bibliography ==
- "Chemist Projects: Chloralkali". A Crisis in the Soap and Glass Industries.
- "Profile of Nicolas Leblanc". Biography of Nicolas Leblanc.
- Chisholm, Hugh, ed. (1911). "Le Blanc, Nicolas" . Encyclopædia Britannica. Vol. 16 (11th ed.). Cambridge University Press. pp. 350–351.
