= Théophile Moreux =

French astronomer and meteorologist

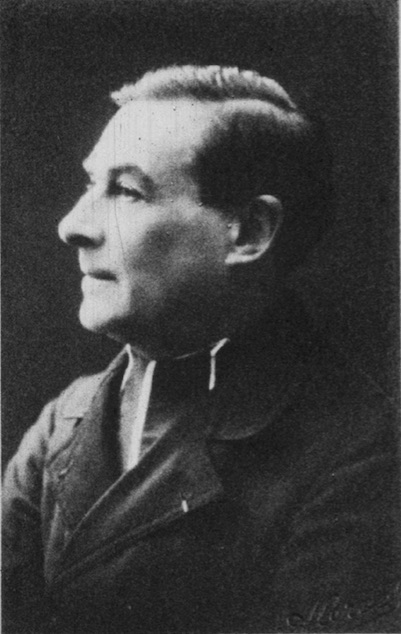
1928 photograph of Théophile Moreux

Théophile Moreux (20 November 1867 – 13 July 1954) was a French astronomer and meteorologist.

== Life ==
Moreux was born at Argent-sur-Sauldre, Cher on 20 November 1867. He initiated the Bourges Observatory at the seminary St Célestin at Bourges, where he was a professor of science and mathematics. He observed surface features of the Moon and Mars. He published star maps and investigated the possibility of life on other planets and moons. He was critical of Percival Lowell's theory of intelligent life on Mars. During 1922 he published a review of astronomical theories and techniques (La Revue Du Ciel). Moreux died at Bourges on 13 July 1954.

The Moreux crater on Mars was named in his honor.

== Works ==
- Théophile Moreux (1926). Astronomy to-day. E. P. Dutton and company.
