= Rère =

River in France

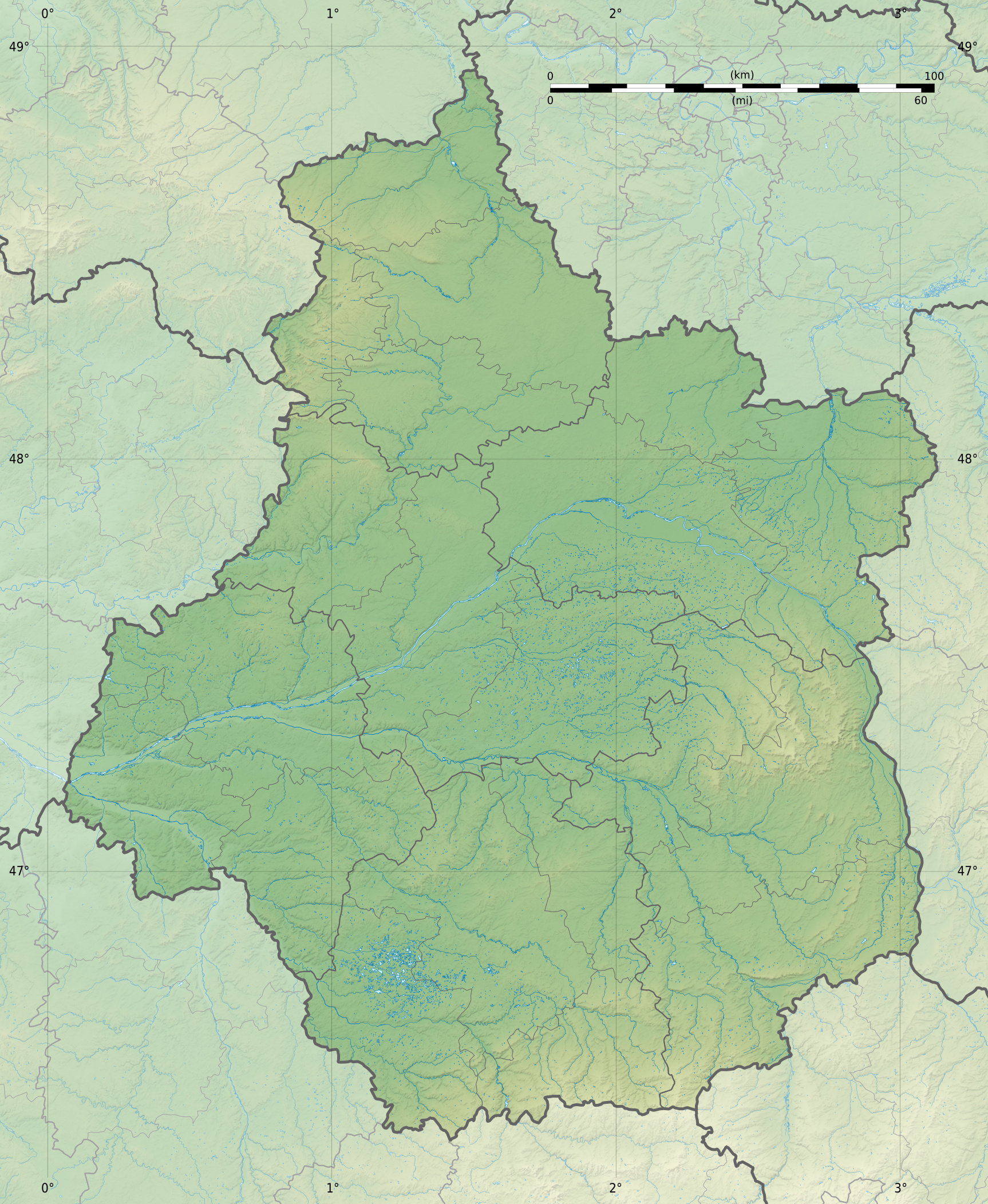
- Location within France Location within Centre-Val de Loire

Location
- Country: France

Physical characteristics
- Source
  - location: Presly
  - coordinates: 47°22′32″N 02°22′24″E
  - elevation: 207 m (679 ft)
- Mouth
  - location: Sauldre
  - coordinates: 47°21′34″N 01°49′41″E
  - elevation: 85 m (279 ft)
- Length: 53.4 km (33.2 mi)

Basin features
- Progression: Sauldre→ Cher→ Loire→ Atlantic Ocean

The Rère (French pronunciation: [ʁɛʁ]) is a 53.4-kilometre (33.2 mi) long river in the Cher and Loir-et-Cher departments in central France. Its source is at Presly. It flows generally west. It is a left tributary of the Sauldre, into which it flows at Villeherviers.

== Departments and communes along its course ==
This list is ordered from source to mouth:

- Cher: Presly, Ménétréol-sur-Sauldre, Nançay,
- Loir-et-Cher: Theillay, La Ferté-Imbault, Châtres-sur-Cher, Selles-Saint-Denis, Langon, Villeherviers,
