= Communauté de communes Sauldre et Sologne =

Federation of municipalities in France

Sauldre et Sologne
- Communauté de communes
- Country: France
- Region: Centre-Val de Loire
- Department: Cher
- No. of communes: {{{nbcomm}}}
- Established: 29 December 2005

Government
  - President (2020–2026): Laurence Renier
- Area: 970.8 km^{2} (374.8 sq mi)
- Population (2018): 14,597
  - Density: 15.04/km^{2} (38.94/sq mi)

The communauté de communes Sauldre et Sologne was created on December 29, 2005 and is located in the Cher département of the Centre-Val de Loire region of France. In January 2021 Nançay left the communauté de communes Vierzon-Sologne-Berry and joined Sauldre et Sologne. Its area is 970.8 km^{2}, and its population was 14,597 in 2018.

== Composition ==
The communauté de communes consists of the following 14 communes:

1. Argent-sur-Sauldre
2. Aubigny-sur-Nère
3. Blancafort
4. Brinon-sur-Sauldre
5. La Chapelle-d'Angillon
6. Clémont
7. Ennordres
8. Ivoy-le-Pré
9. Ménétréol-sur-Sauldre
10. Méry-ès-Bois
11. Nançay
12. Oizon
13. Presly
14. Sainte-Montaine
