= Saint-Laurent, Cher =

Saint-Laurent
- Commune
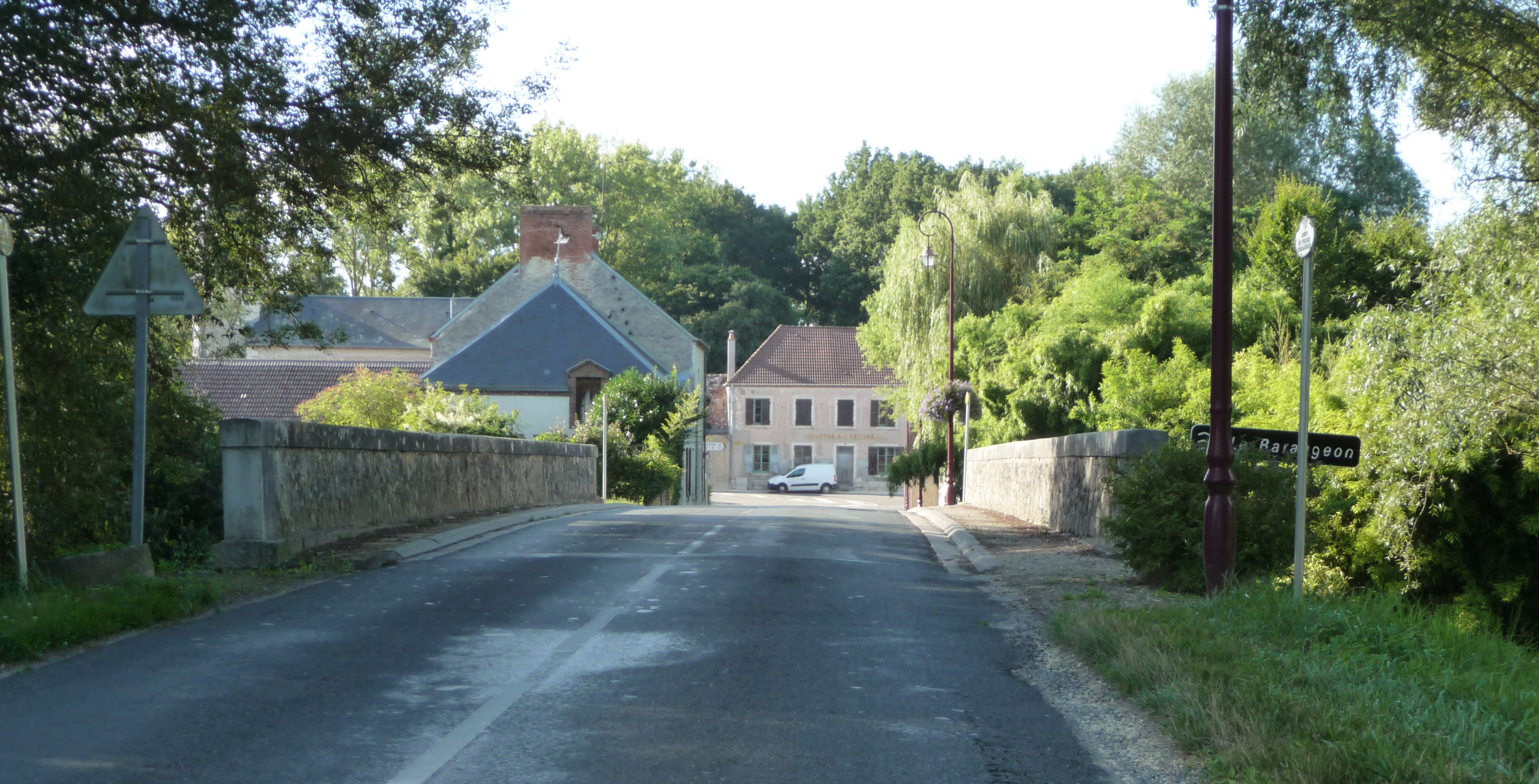
- The road into Saint-Laurent

- Coat of arms
- Location of Saint-Laurent
- Location within France Location within Centre-Val de Loire
- Coordinates: 47°13′33″N 2°12′10″E
- Country: France
- Region: Centre-Val de Loire
- Department: Cher
- Arrondissement: Vierzon
- Canton: Saint-Martin-d'Auxigny
- Intercommunality: CC Vierzon-Sologne-Berry

Government
  - Mayor (2020–2026): Fabien Mathieu
- Area^{1}: 38.72 km^{2} (14.95 sq mi)
- Elevation: 115 m (377 ft)
- Highest elevation: 188 m (617 ft)
- Lowest elevation: 109 m (358 ft)
- Population (2023): 511
  - Density: 13.2/km^{2} (34.2/sq mi)
- Time zone: UTC+01:00 (CET)
  - Summer (DST): UTC+02:00 (CEST)
- INSEE/Postal code: 18219 /18330
- ^{1} French Land Register data, which excludes lakes, ponds, glaciers > 1 km^{2} (0.386 sq mi or 247 acres) and river estuaries.

Saint-Laurent (French pronunciation: [sɛ̃ loʁɑ̃]) is a commune in the Cher department in central France.

== Population ==
Historical population
Year	Pop.	±% p.a.
1968	231	—
1975	210	−1.35%
1982	253	+2.70%
1990	354	+4.29%
1999	352	−0.06%
2007	393	+1.39%
2012	455	+2.97%
2017	502	+1.99%
2023	511	+0.30%
Source: INSEE

== See also ==
- Communes of the Cher department
