= Sainte-Gemme-en-Sancerrois =

- Commune
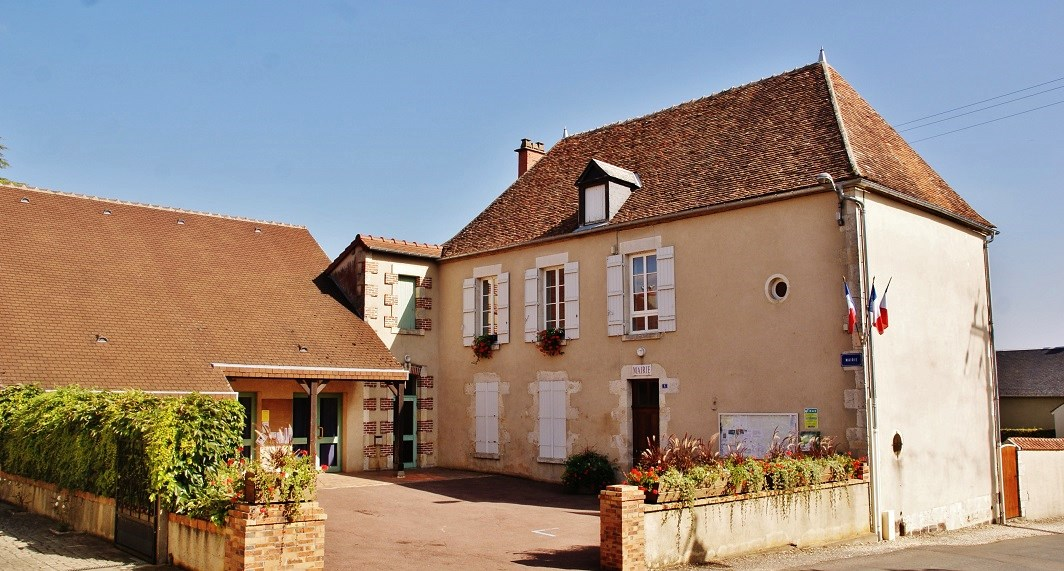
- The town hall in Sainte-Gemme-en-Sancerrois
- Location of Sainte-Gemme-en-Sancerrois
- Location within France Location within Centre-Val de Loire
- Coordinates: 47°23′41″N 2°49′02″E
- Country: France
- Region: Centre-Val de Loire
- Department: Cher
- Arrondissement: Bourges
- Canton: Sancerre
- Intercommunality: CC Pays Fort Sancerrois Val de Loire

Government
  - Mayor (2020–2026): Gaëlle Lefebvre
- Area^{1}: 14.84 km^{2} (5.73 sq mi)
- Elevation: 270 m (890 ft)
- Highest elevation: 303 m (994 ft)
- Lowest elevation: 174 m (571 ft)
- Population (2023): 400
  - Density: 27/km^{2} (70/sq mi)
- Time zone: UTC+01:00 (CET)
  - Summer (DST): UTC+02:00 (CEST)
- INSEE/Postal code: 18208 /18240
- ^{1} French Land Register data, which excludes lakes, ponds, glaciers > 1 km^{2} (0.386 sq mi or 247 acres) and river estuaries.

Sainte-Gemme-en-Sancerrois is a commune in the Cher department in central France.

== Population ==
Historical population
Year	Pop.	±% p.a.
1968	401	—
1975	337	−2.45%
1982	361	+0.99%
1990	400	+1.29%
1999	416	+0.44%
2007	382	−1.06%
2012	413	+1.57%
2017	427	+0.67%
2023	400	−1.08%
Source: INSEE

== See also ==
- Communes of the Cher department
