= Oizon =

- Commune
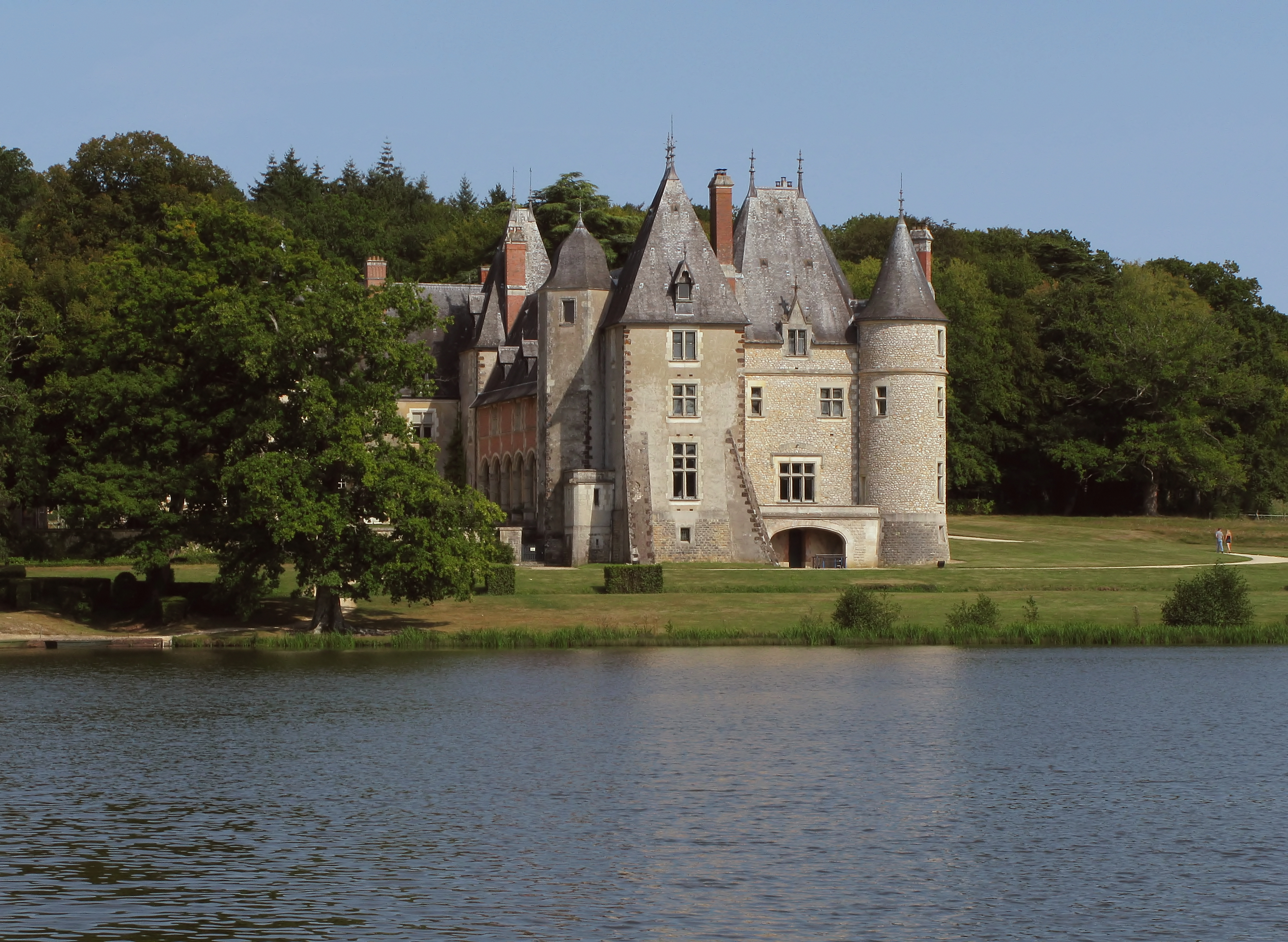
- The Château of La Verrerie
- Location of Oizon
- Location within France Location within Centre-Val de Loire
- Coordinates: 47°28′30″N 2°30′58″E
- Country: France
- Region: Centre-Val de Loire
- Department: Cher
- Arrondissement: Vierzon
- Canton: Aubigny-sur-Nère
- Intercommunality: Sauldre et Sologne

Government
  - Mayor (2024–2026): Marc Gourdou
- Area^{1}: 62.03 km^{2} (23.95 sq mi)
- Elevation: 250 m (820 ft)
- Highest elevation: 326 m (1,070 ft)
- Lowest elevation: 184 m (604 ft)
- Population (2023): 664
  - Density: 10.7/km^{2} (27.7/sq mi)
- Time zone: UTC+01:00 (CET)
  - Summer (DST): UTC+02:00 (CEST)
- INSEE/Postal code: 18170 /18700
- ^{1} French Land Register data, which excludes lakes, ponds, glaciers > 1 km^{2} (0.386 sq mi or 247 acres) and river estuaries.

Oizon (French pronunciation: [wazɔ̃]) is a commune in the Cher department in the Centre-Val de Loire region of France.

== Geography ==
An area of streams, lakes, forestry and farming comprising the village and several hamlets situated some 26 miles (42 km) north of Bourges at the junction of the D923, D39, D213 roads and also on the D7, D89 and D21 roads. The rivers Nère and Oizenotte flow through the commune.

== Population ==
Historical population
Year	Pop.	±% p.a.
1968	701	—
1975	660	−0.86%
1982	725	+1.35%
1990	776	+0.85%
1999	752	−0.35%
2007	730	−0.37%
2012	706	−0.67%
2017	675	−0.89%
2023	664	−0.27%
Source: INSEE

== Sights ==
- The church of St. Martial, dating from the thirteenth century.
- Château de la Verrerie (Cher)
- A watermill.

== See also ==
- Communes of the Cher department
