= Charentonnay =

- Commune
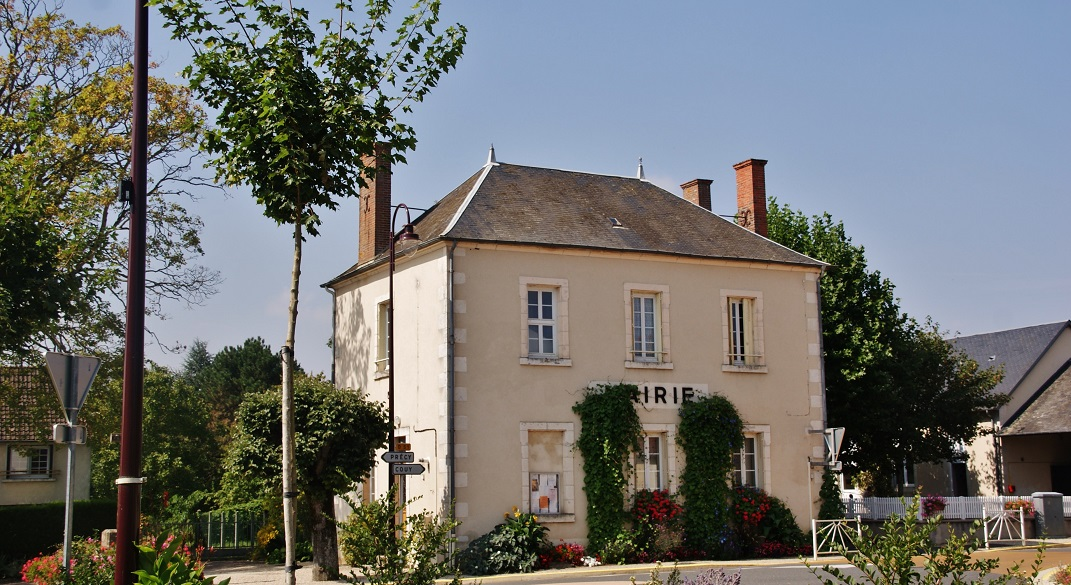
- The town hall in Charentonnay
- Location of Charentonnay
- Location within France Location within Centre-Val de Loire
- Coordinates: 47°08′47″N 2°52′29″E
- Country: France
- Region: Centre-Val de Loire
- Department: Cher
- Arrondissement: Bourges
- Canton: Avord

Government
  - Mayor (2020–2026): Thierry Duprez
- Area^{1}: 21.85 km^{2} (8.44 sq mi)
- Highest elevation: 227 m (745 ft)
- Lowest elevation: 173 m (568 ft)
- Population (2023): 282
  - Density: 12.9/km^{2} (33.4/sq mi)
- Time zone: UTC+01:00 (CET)
  - Summer (DST): UTC+02:00 (CEST)
- INSEE/Postal code: 18053 /18140
- ^{1} French Land Register data, which excludes lakes, ponds, glaciers > 1 km^{2} (0.386 sq mi or 247 acres) and river estuaries.

Charentonnay (French pronunciation: [ʃaʁɑ̃tɔnɛ]) is a commune in the Cher department in the Centre-Val de Loire region of France.

== Geography ==
A farming village with three hamlets situated some 22 miles (35 km) east of Bourges at the junction of the N151 with the D51, D25 and D72 roads. The commune lies on the pilgrimage route known as the Way of St. James.

== Population ==
Historical population
Year	Pop.	±% p.a.
1968	381	—
1975	313	−2.77%
1982	317	+0.18%
1990	329	+0.47%
1999	314	−0.52%
2007	331	+0.66%
2012	310	−1.30%
2017	289	−1.39%
2023	282	−0.41%
Source: INSEE

== Sights ==
- The church of St. Pierre, dating from the fourteenth century.
- A fifteenth century chateau.

== See also ==
- Communes of the Cher department
