= Beffes =

- Commune
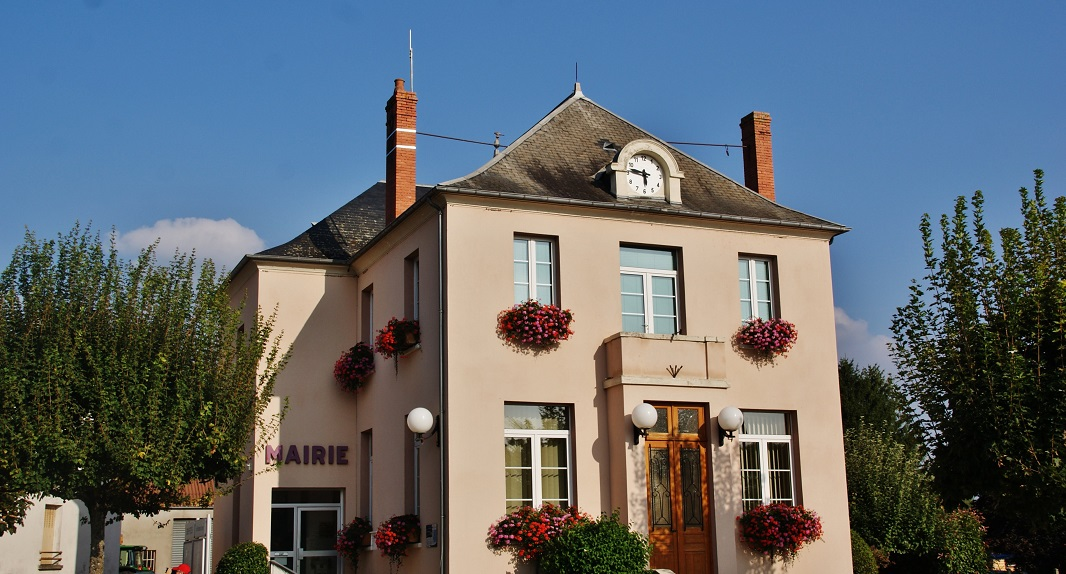
- The town hall in Beffes
- Location of Beffes
- Location within France Location within Centre-Val de Loire
- Coordinates: 47°05′37″N 3°00′30″E
- Country: France
- Region: Centre-Val de Loire
- Department: Cher
- Arrondissement: Bourges
- Canton: Avord

Government
  - Mayor (2020–2026): Olivier Michel Le Cam
- Area^{1}: 11.83 km^{2} (4.57 sq mi)
- Elevation: 166 m (545 ft)
- Highest elevation: 196 m (643 ft)
- Lowest elevation: 153 m (502 ft)
- Population (2023): 602
  - Density: 50.9/km^{2} (132/sq mi)
- Time zone: UTC+01:00 (CET)
  - Summer (DST): UTC+02:00 (CEST)
- INSEE/Postal code: 18025 /18320
- ^{1} French Land Register data, which excludes lakes, ponds, glaciers > 1 km^{2} (0.386 sq mi or 247 acres) and river estuaries.

Beffes (French pronunciation: [bɛf]) is a commune in the Cher department in the Centre-Val de Loire region of France by the banks of the river Loire, about 27 miles (43 km) east of Bourges. The canal latéral à la Loire flows through the centre of the commune.

== Population ==
Historical population
Year	Pop.	±% p.a.
1968	637	—
1975	689	+1.13%
1982	662	−0.57%
1990	644	−0.34%
1999	672	+0.47%
2007	692	+0.37%
2012	684	−0.23%
2017	641	−1.29%
2023	602	−1.04%
Source: INSEE

== See also ==
- Communes of the Cher department
