= Nançay =

- Commune
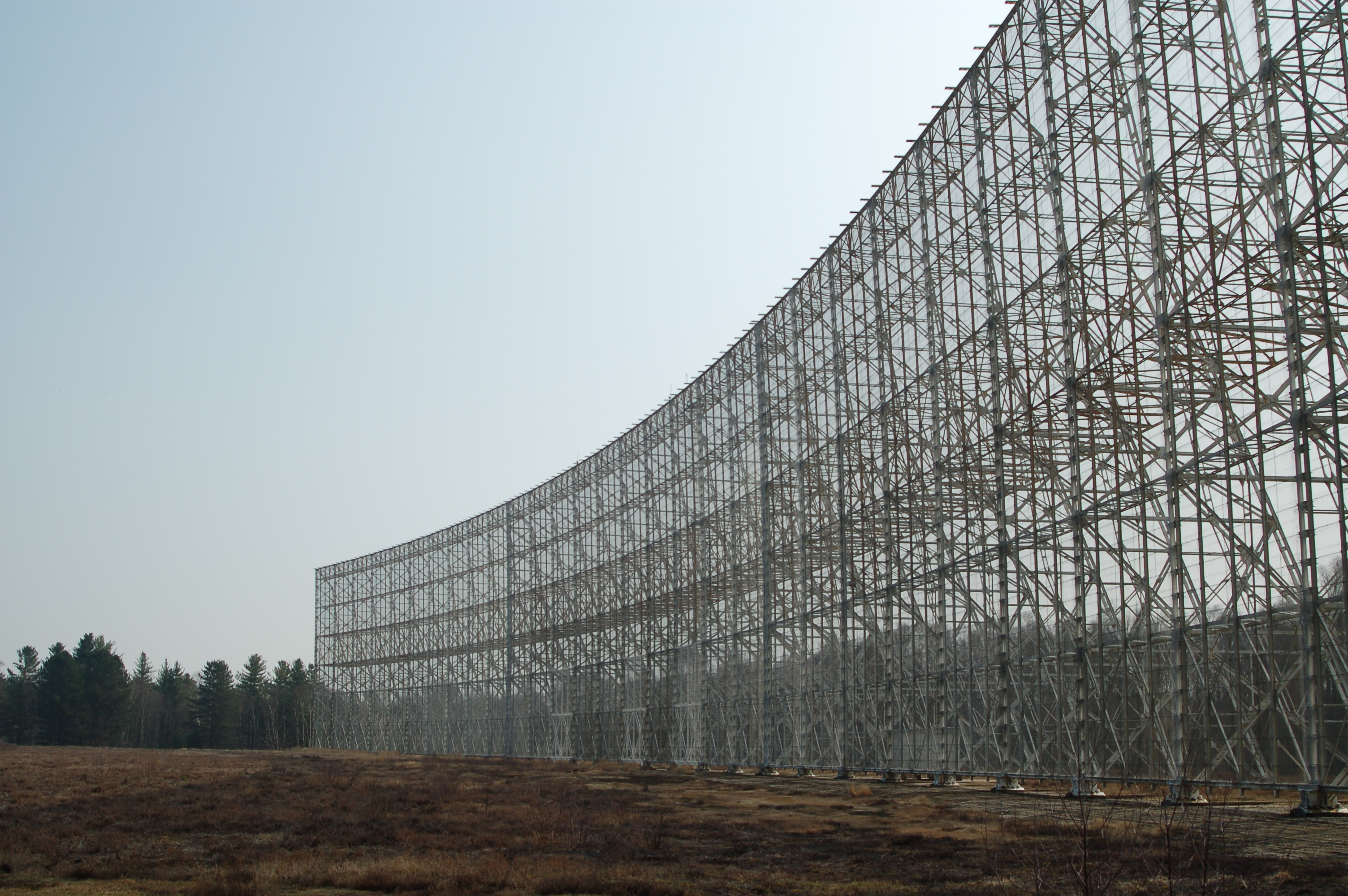
- Radio telescope
- Location of Nançay
- Location within France Location within Centre-Val de Loire
- Coordinates: 47°21′02″N 2°11′43″E
- Country: France
- Region: Centre-Val de Loire
- Department: Cher
- Arrondissement: Vierzon
- Canton: Aubigny-sur-Nère
- Intercommunality: CC Sauldre et Sologne

Government
  - Mayor (2020–2026): Alain Urbain
- Area^{1}: 106.33 km^{2} (41.05 sq mi)
- Elevation: 125 m (410 ft)
- Highest elevation: 163 m (535 ft)
- Lowest elevation: 112 m (367 ft)
- Population (2023): 748
  - Density: 7.03/km^{2} (18.2/sq mi)
- Time zone: UTC+01:00 (CET)
  - Summer (DST): UTC+02:00 (CEST)
- INSEE/Postal code: 18159 /18330
- ^{1} French Land Register data, which excludes lakes, ponds, glaciers > 1 km^{2} (0.386 sq mi or 247 acres) and river estuaries.

Nançay (French pronunciation: [nɑ̃sɛ]) is a commune in the Cher department in central France.

== Geography ==
The village is located south of the Sologne and northeast of Vierzon. The Rère flows southwest through the middle of the commune.

== History ==
Its name comes from Nanciacos and first appeared in 1010 (Acts of the Abbot Engilbert). The territory belonged successively to the County of Sancerre and the area of La Chatre. Joan of Arc stayed there, leaving her name to the spring maiden. Its castle dates from the fifteenth century, and was rebuilt during the Renaissance.

== Population ==
Historical population
Year	Pop.	±% p.a.
1968	753	—
1975	698	−1.08%
1982	748	+0.99%
1990	784	+0.59%
1999	738	−0.67%
2007	855	+1.86%
2012	879	+0.56%
2017	832	−1.09%
2023	748	−1.76%
Source: INSEE

== Sights ==
- The Nançay Radio Observatory, 3 km (1.9 mi) north of the town. The site was chosen in 1953 by the École Normale Supérieure because of its size, its relative proximity to Paris and the lack of industrial base that can generate noise. Inaugurated by Charles de Gaulle in 1965. The 32 metres (105 ft) by 5 metres (16 ft) diameter decametric network (144 branches in 10 000 m²).
- The Pôle des Étoiles offers tours of the Radioastronomy facility, planetarium shows and self-guided tours of its astronomy exhibits. It also includes educational facilities.
- Private Château built on a foundations of the fifteenth-century castle, rebuilt in the Renaissance and then in 1848.
- Église Saint-Laurian, built in 1624, rebuilt in the nineteenth century after it was destroyed by fire.
- Capazza Gallery of contemporary art, an historical monument created in 1975 by Gerard and Sophie Capazza.

== Gastronomy ==
- A shortbread biscuit was created in 1953, after an error in following a recipe by Jacques and Albert Fleurier.

== Personalities ==
- The 18th-century French historian and political writer Louis-Gabriel Du Buat-Nançay (1732–1787) died in Nançay
- Alain-Fournier lived in and described the village in his novel Le Grand Meaulnes.

== See also ==
- Communes of the Cher department
