= Vignoux-sur-Barangeon =

- Commune
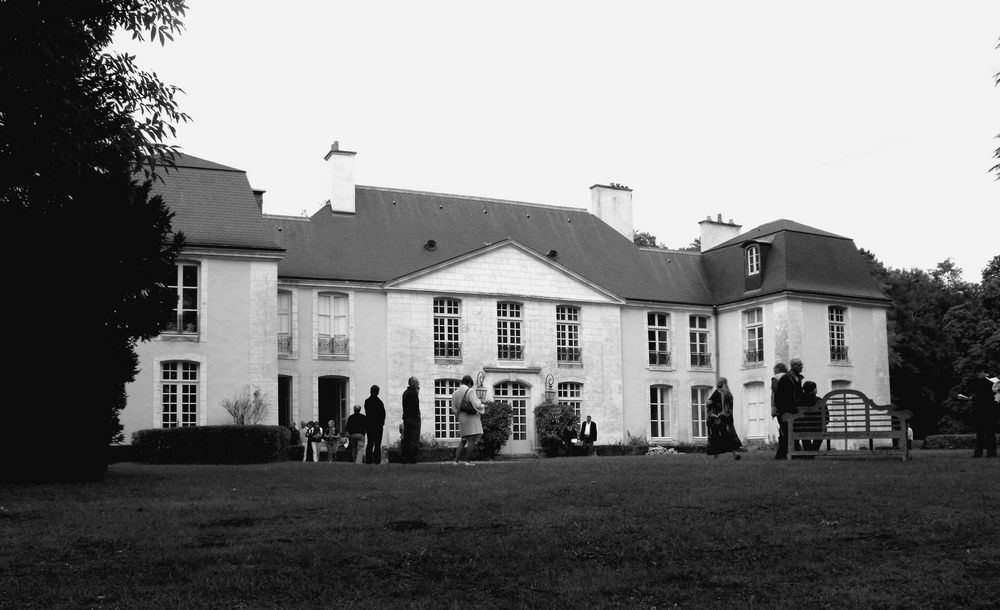
- The Chateau of Blosset

- Coat of arms
- Location of Vignoux-sur-Barangeon
- Location within France Location within Centre-Val de Loire
- Coordinates: 47°12′09″N 2°10′21″E
- Country: France
- Region: Centre-Val de Loire
- Department: Cher
- Arrondissement: Vierzon
- Canton: Saint-Martin-d'Auxigny
- Intercommunality: CC Vierzon-Sologne-Berry

Government
  - Mayor (2020–2026): Philippe Bulteau
- Area^{1}: 24.87 km^{2} (9.60 sq mi)
- Elevation: 112 m (367 ft)
- Highest elevation: 176 m (577 ft)
- Lowest elevation: 102 m (335 ft)
- Population (2023): 2,026
  - Density: 81.46/km^{2} (211.0/sq mi)
- Time zone: UTC+01:00 (CET)
  - Summer (DST): UTC+02:00 (CEST)
- INSEE/Postal code: 18281 /18500
- ^{1} French Land Register data, which excludes lakes, ponds, glaciers > 1 km^{2} (0.386 sq mi or 247 acres) and river estuaries.

Vignoux-sur-Barangeon (French pronunciation: [viɲu syʁ baʁɑ̃ʒɔ̃]) is a commune in the Cher department in central France.

== Population ==
Historical population
Year	Pop.	±% p.a.
1968	1,042	—
1975	1,106	+0.86%
1982	1,503	+4.48%
1990	1,844	+2.59%
1999	1,885	+0.24%
2007	2,042	+1.01%
2012	2,144	+0.98%
2017	2,119	−0.23%
2023	2,026	−0.75%
Source: INSEE

== See also ==
- Communes of the Cher department
