= Presly =

- Commune
- Location of Presly
- Location within France Location within Centre-Val de Loire
- Coordinates: 47°23′20″N 2°21′32″E
- Country: France
- Region: Centre-Val de Loire
- Department: Cher
- Arrondissement: Vierzon
- Canton: Aubigny-sur-Nère
- Intercommunality: Sauldre et Sologne

Government
  - Mayor (2020–2026): Nicolas Moreau
- Area^{1}: 74.63 km^{2} (28.81 sq mi)
- Elevation: 213 m (699 ft)
- Highest elevation: 238 m (781 ft)
- Lowest elevation: 137 m (449 ft)
- Population (2023): 207
  - Density: 2.77/km^{2} (7.18/sq mi)
- Time zone: UTC+01:00 (CET)
  - Summer (DST): UTC+02:00 (CEST)
- INSEE/Postal code: 18185 /18380
- ^{1} French Land Register data, which excludes lakes, ponds, glaciers > 1 km^{2} (0.386 sq mi or 247 acres) and river estuaries.

Presly (French pronunciation: [pʁɛli]) is a commune in the Cher department in the Centre-Val de Loire region of France.

== Geography ==
A large area of streams, lakes, forestry and farming comprising the village and several hamlets situated some 22 miles (35 km) north of Bourges at the junction of the D12, D58 and the D30 roads.

The river Rère has its source near the hamlet of Sommerère in the southeastern part of the commune. It flows northwest through the middle of the commune, enters the territory of Ménétréol-sur-Sauldre and flows back southwest in the northwestern part of Presly.

== Population ==
Historical population
Year	Pop.	±% p.a.
1968	371	—
1975	301	−2.94%
1982	247	−2.79%
1990	204	−2.36%
1999	228	+1.24%
2007	251	+1.21%
2012	241	−0.81%
2017	248	+0.57%
2023	207	−2.97%
Source: INSEE

== Sights ==
- The church of St. Caprais, dating from the thirteenth century.
- The seventeenth-century chateau La Planche.

== See also ==
- Communes of the Cher department
