= Canton of Aubigny-sur-Nère =

Coordinates: 47°29′22″N 2°26′24″E

Aubigny-sur-Nère
- Canton
- Interactive map of Aubigny-sur-Nère
- Country: France
- Region: Centre-Val de Loire
- Department: Cher
- No. of communes: {{{nbcomm}}}
- Area: 1,038.13 km^{2} (400.82 sq mi)
- Population (2023): 15,357
  - Density: 14.793/km^{2} (38.314/sq mi)
- INSEE code: 18 01

The Canton of Aubigny-sur-Nère is a canton situated in the Cher département and in the Centre-Val de Loire region of France.

== Geography ==
An area of forestry and farming in the valley of the river Nère, in the northeastern part of the arrondissement of Vierzon, centred on the town of Aubigny-sur-Nère. The altitude varies from 131m at Ménétréol-sur-Sauldre to 326m at Oizon, with an average altitude of 191m.

== Composition ==
At the French canton reorganisation which came into effect in March 2015, the canton was expanded from 4 to 15 communes:

- Argent-sur-Sauldre
- Aubigny-sur-Nère
- Blancafort
- Brinon-sur-Sauldre
- La Chapelle-d'Angillon
- Clémont
- Ennordres
- Ivoy-le-Pré
- Ménétréol-sur-Sauldre
- Méry-ès-Bois
- Nançay
- Neuvy-sur-Barangeon
- Oizon
- Presly
- Sainte-Montaine

== Population ==
Historical population
Year	Pop.	±% p.a.
2013	16,352	—
2018	15,711	−0.80%
Source: INSEE

== See also ==
- Arrondissements of the Cher department
- Cantons of the Cher department
- Communes of the Cher department
