= Santranges =

- Commune
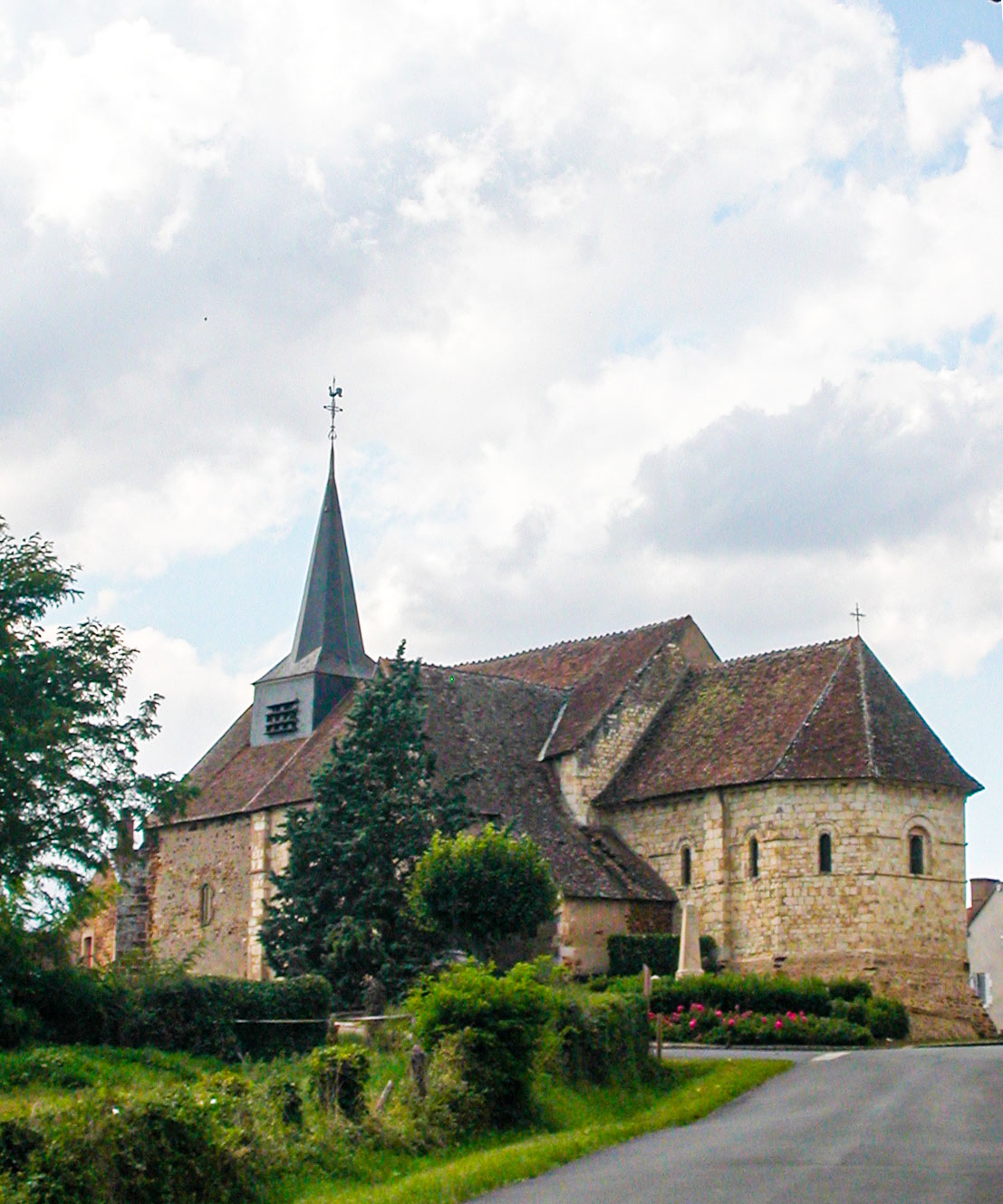
- The church in Santranges

- Coat of arms
- Location of Santranges
- Location within France Location within Centre-Val de Loire
- Coordinates: 47°29′56″N 2°46′22″E
- Country: France
- Region: Centre-Val de Loire
- Department: Cher
- Arrondissement: Bourges
- Canton: Sancerre
- Intercommunality: CC Pays Fort Sancerrois Val de Loire

Government
  - Mayor (2020–2026): Anne Péronnet
- Area^{1}: 24.31 km^{2} (9.39 sq mi)
- Elevation: 205 m (673 ft)
- Highest elevation: 269 m (883 ft)
- Lowest elevation: 174 m (571 ft)
- Population (2023): 440
  - Density: 18/km^{2} (47/sq mi)
- Time zone: UTC+01:00 (CET)
  - Summer (DST): UTC+02:00 (CEST)
- INSEE/Postal code: 18243 /18240
- ^{1} French Land Register data, which excludes lakes, ponds, glaciers > 1 km^{2} (0.386 sq mi or 247 acres) and river estuaries.

Santranges (French pronunciation: [sɑ̃tʁɑ̃ʒ]) is a commune in the Cher department in the Centre-Val de Loire region of France.

== Geography ==
A large farming area comprising the village and several hamlets situated in the valleys of the rivers Avenelle and Notre-Heure, about 32 miles (51 km) northeast of Bourges, at the junction of the D926, D82 and the D54 roads. The commune borders the department of Loiret.

== Population ==
Historical population
Year	Pop.	±% p.a.
1968	514	—
1975	472	−1.21%
1982	420	−1.65%
1990	390	−0.92%
1999	369	−0.61%
2007	428	+1.87%
2012	417	−0.52%
2017	410	−0.34%
2023	440	+1.18%
Source: INSEE

== Sights ==
- The church of Notre-Dame, dating from the twelfth century.

== See also ==
- Communes of the Cher department
