= Sainte-Montaine =

- Commune
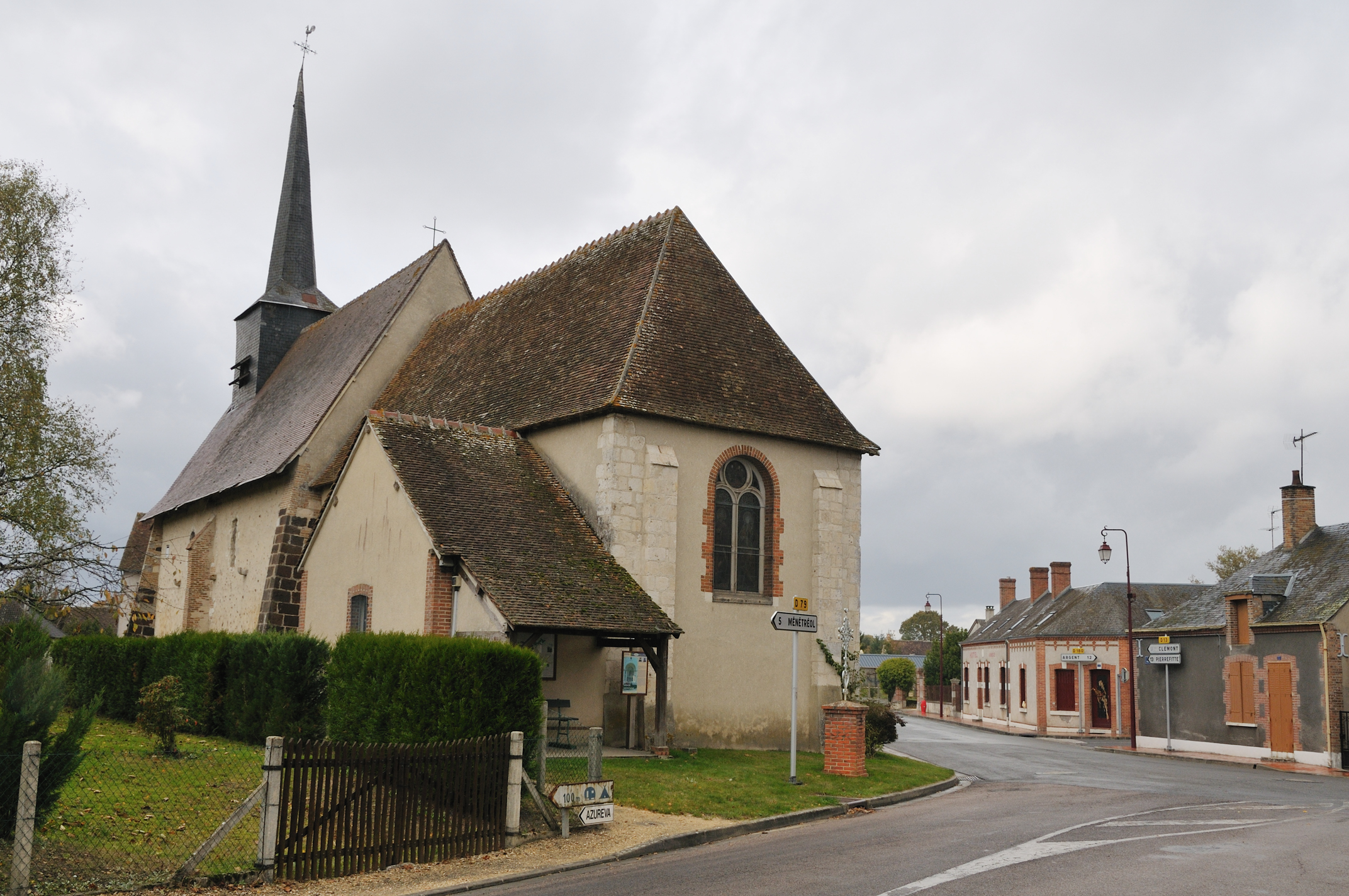
- The church in Sainte-Montaine
- Location of Sainte-Montaine
- Location within France Location within Centre-Val de Loire
- Coordinates: 47°29′28″N 2°19′15″E
- Country: France
- Region: Centre-Val de Loire
- Department: Cher
- Arrondissement: Vierzon
- Canton: Aubigny-sur-Nère
- Intercommunality: Sauldre et Sologne

Government
  - Mayor (2020–2026): Jean-Yves Debarre
- Area^{1}: 53.79 km^{2} (20.77 sq mi)
- Elevation: 167 m (548 ft)
- Highest elevation: 183 m (600 ft)
- Lowest elevation: 133 m (436 ft)
- Population (2023): 166
  - Density: 3.09/km^{2} (7.99/sq mi)
- Time zone: UTC+01:00 (CET)
  - Summer (DST): UTC+02:00 (CEST)
- INSEE/Postal code: 18227 /18700
- ^{1} French Land Register data, which excludes lakes, ponds, glaciers > 1 km^{2} (0.386 sq mi or 247 acres) and river estuaries.

Sainte-Montaine (French pronunciation: [sɛ̃t mɔ̃tɛn]) is a commune in the Cher department in the Centre-Val de Loire region of France.

== Geography ==
An area of streams, lakes, forestry and farming comprising a small village and two hamlets situated some 28 miles (45 km) north of Bourges at the junction of the D79, D180 and D13 roads. The small river Boute-Vive rises in the commune.

== Population ==
Historical population
Year	Pop.	±% p.a.
1968	253	—
1975	226	−1.60%
1982	233	+0.44%
1990	206	−1.53%
1999	170	−2.11%
2007	220	+3.28%
2012	184	−3.51%
2017	181	−0.33%
2023	166	−1.43%
Source: INSEE

== Personalities ==
- Marguerite Audoux (1863- 1937), French novelist, lived here in her youth.

== Sights ==
- The church, dating from the fifteenth century.
- The feudal motte.
- The chapel of Belle Fontaine.

== See also ==
- Communes of the Cher department
