= Ennordres =

- Commune
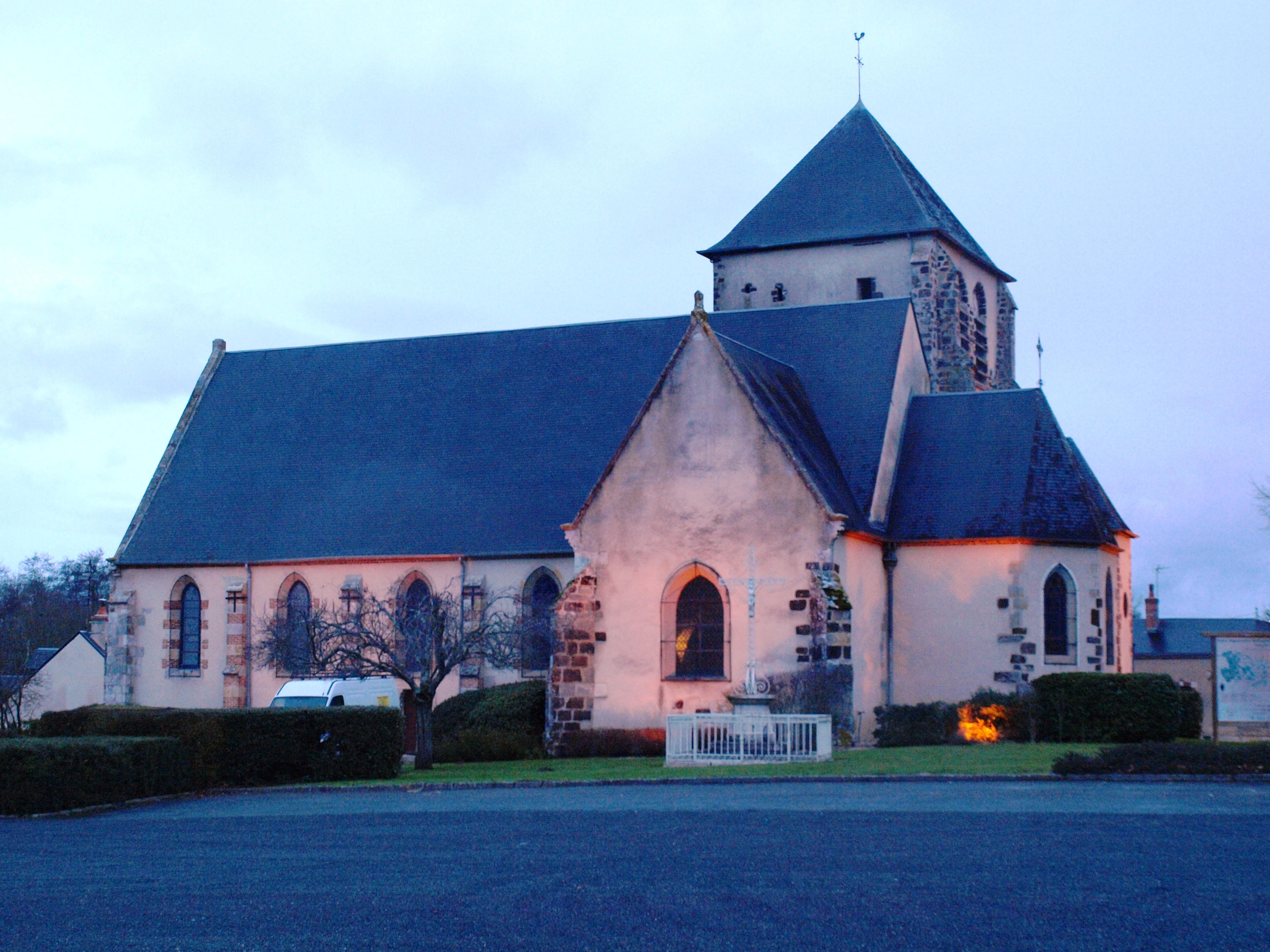
- The church in Ennordres
- Location of Ennordres
- Location within France Location within Centre-Val de Loire
- Coordinates: 47°25′51″N 2°23′03″E
- Country: France
- Region: Centre-Val de Loire
- Department: Cher
- Arrondissement: Vierzon
- Canton: Aubigny-sur-Nère
- Intercommunality: Sauldre et Sologne

Government
  - Mayor (2020–2026): Hugues Duboin
- Area^{1}: 63.79 km^{2} (24.63 sq mi)
- Elevation: 185 m (607 ft)
- Highest elevation: 293 m (961 ft)
- Lowest elevation: 154 m (505 ft)
- Population (2023): 204
  - Density: 3.20/km^{2} (8.28/sq mi)
- Time zone: UTC+01:00 (CET)
  - Summer (DST): UTC+02:00 (CEST)
- INSEE/Postal code: 18088 /18380
- ^{1} French Land Register data, which excludes lakes, ponds, glaciers > 1 km^{2} (0.386 sq mi or 247 acres) and river estuaries.

Ennordres is a commune in the Cher department in the Centre-Val de Loire region of France.

== Geography ==
Ennordres is made up of a rural village and associated small hamlets located among forests and farms in the valley of the Petite Sauldre river, approximately 23 miles (37 km) north of Bourges at the junction of the D171, D30 and D181 roads and on the D940 road.

== Population ==
Historical population
Year	Pop.	±% p.a.
1968	396	—
1975	307	−3.57%
1982	589	+9.76%
1990	242	−10.52%
1999	249	+0.32%
2007	223	−1.37%
2012	216	−0.64%
2017	210	−0.56%
2023	204	−0.48%
Source: INSEE

== See also ==
- Communes of the Cher department
