= Méry-ès-Bois =

- Commune
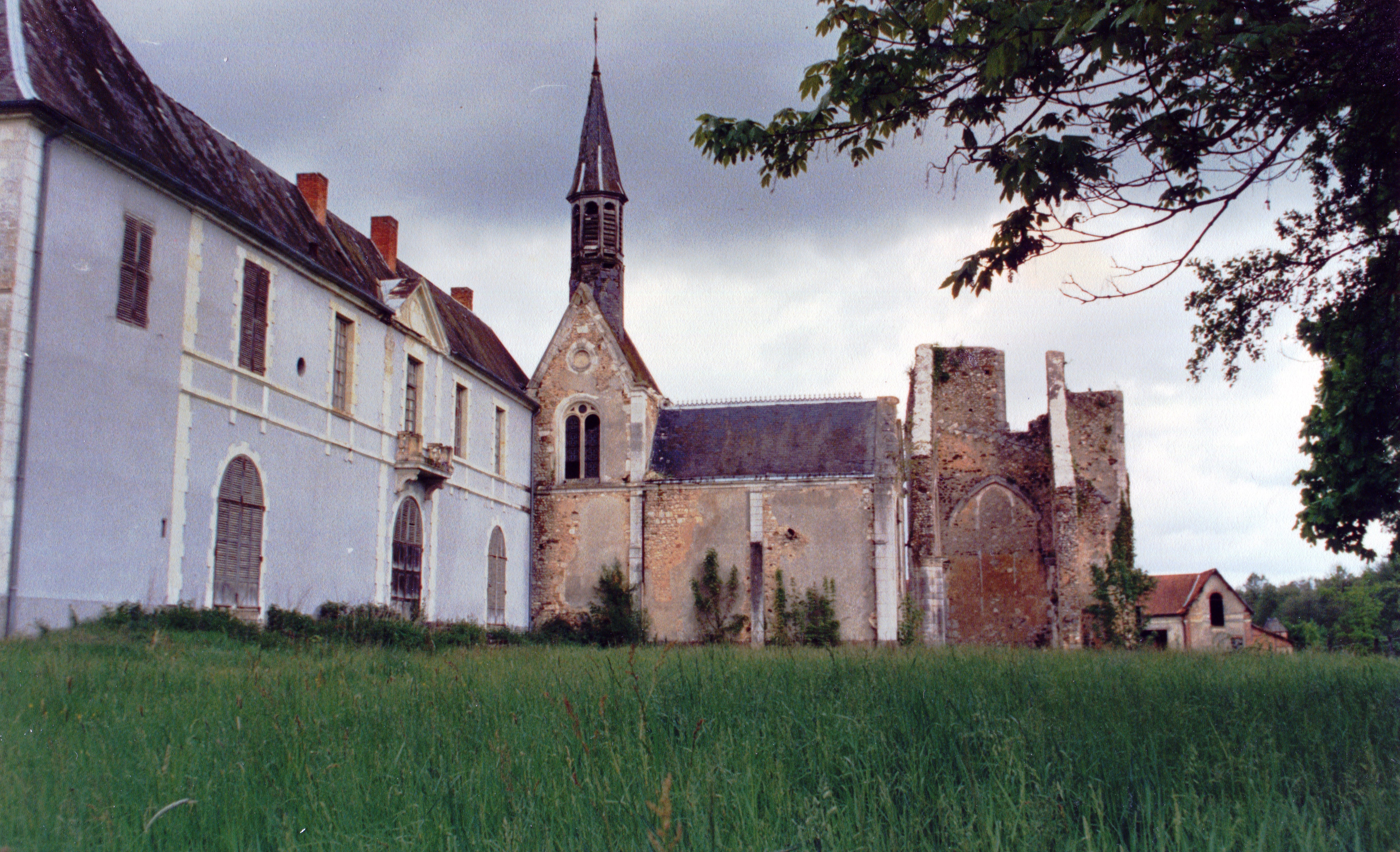
- The Abbey of Loroy, in Méry-ès-Bois, in 1987
- Location of Méry-ès-Bois
- Location within France Location within Centre-Val de Loire
- Coordinates: 47°19′31″N 2°21′46″E
- Country: France
- Region: Centre-Val de Loire
- Department: Cher
- Arrondissement: Vierzon
- Canton: Aubigny-sur-Nère
- Intercommunality: Sauldre et Sologne

Government
  - Mayor (2020–2026): Frédéric Bouteille
- Area^{1}: 91.59 km^{2} (35.36 sq mi)
- Elevation: 250 m (820 ft)
- Highest elevation: 293 m (961 ft)
- Lowest elevation: 171 m (561 ft)
- Population (2023): 533
  - Density: 5.82/km^{2} (15.1/sq mi)
- Time zone: UTC+01:00 (CET)
  - Summer (DST): UTC+02:00 (CEST)
- INSEE/Postal code: 18149 /18380
- ^{1} French Land Register data, which excludes lakes, ponds, glaciers > 1 km^{2} (0.386 sq mi or 247 acres) and river estuaries.

Méry-ès-Bois (French pronunciation: [meʁi ɛs bwa]) is a commune in the Cher department in the Centre-Val de Loire region of France.

== Geography ==
A large area of streams, lakes, forestry and farming comprising the village and several hamlets situated some 16 miles (26 km) north of Bourges at the junction of the D22, D58 and the D168 roads and also on the D926 and D940. Two rivers have their source here, the Mocquart and the Guette and the Barangeon river flows through the middle of the commune.

== Population ==
Historical population
Year	Pop.	±% p.a.
1968	778	—
1975	708	−1.34%
1982	637	−1.50%
1990	659	+0.43%
1999	616	−0.75%
2007	606	−0.20%
2012	590	−0.53%
2017	577	−0.44%
2023	533	−1.31%
Source: INSEE

== Sights ==
- The church of St. Firmin, dating from the eleventh century.
- The thirteenth-century abbey of Loroy.

== See also ==
- Communes of the Cher department
