= Blancafort, Cher =

Blancafort
- Commune
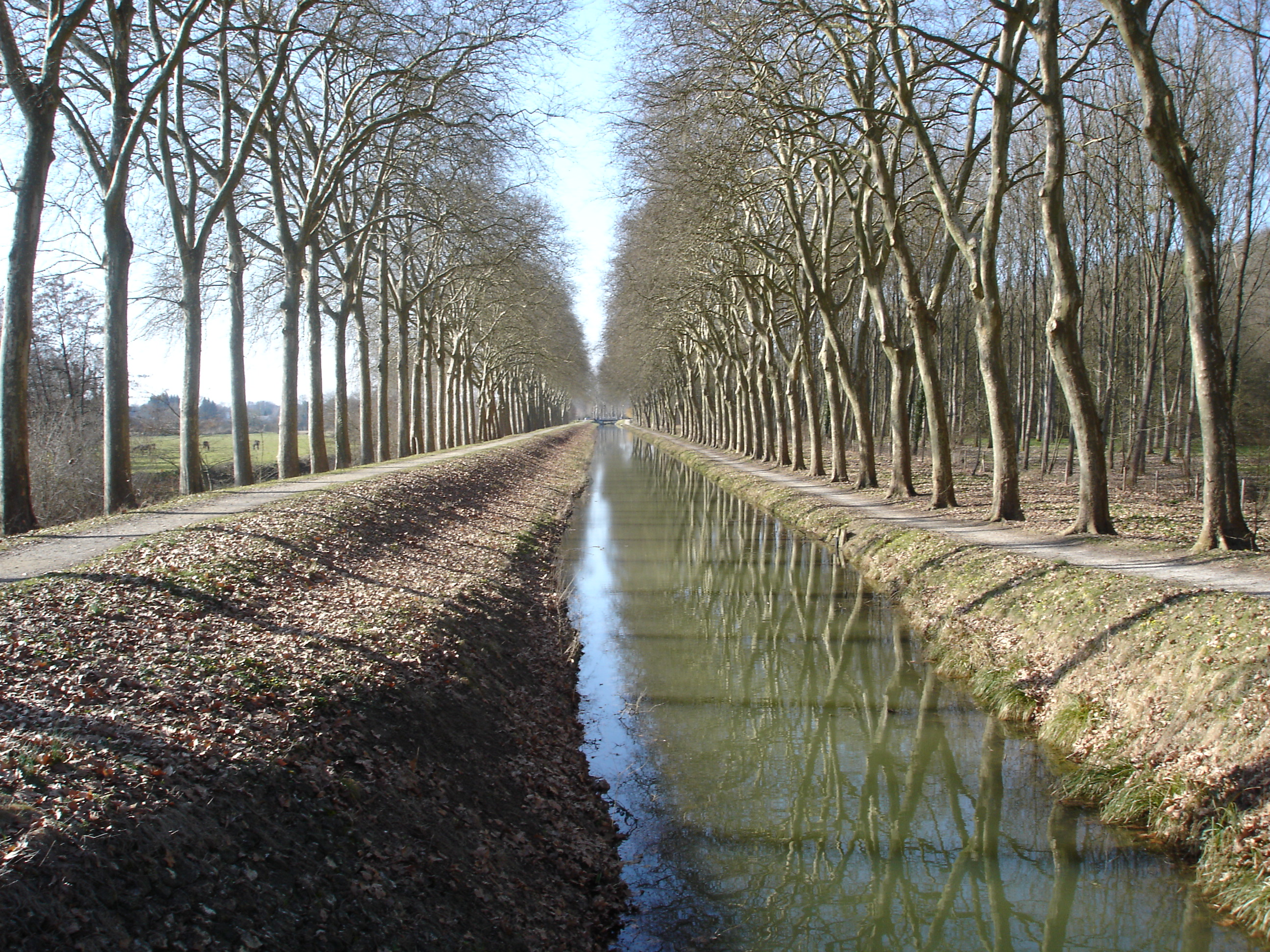
- The Sauldre canal in Blancafort

- Coat of arms
- Location of Blancafort
- Location within France Location within Centre-Val de Loire
- Coordinates: 47°32′00″N 2°31′53″E
- Country: France
- Region: Centre-Val de Loire
- Department: Cher
- Arrondissement: Vierzon
- Canton: Aubigny-sur-Nère
- Intercommunality: CC Sauldre et Sologne

Government
  - Mayor (2020–2026): Pascal Margerin
- Area^{1}: 64.35 km^{2} (24.85 sq mi)
- Elevation: 175 m (574 ft)
- Highest elevation: 261 m (856 ft)
- Lowest elevation: 162 m (531 ft)
- Population (2023): 998
  - Density: 15.5/km^{2} (40.2/sq mi)
- Time zone: UTC+01:00 (CET)
  - Summer (DST): UTC+02:00 (CEST)
- INSEE/Postal code: 18030 /18410
- ^{1} French Land Register data, which excludes lakes, ponds, glaciers > 1 km^{2} (0.386 sq mi or 247 acres) and river estuaries.

Blancafort (French pronunciation: [blɑ̃kafɔʁ]) is a commune in the Cher department in the Centre-Val de Loire region of France.

== Geography ==
A forestry and farming village situated in the valley of the river Sauldre, some 33 miles (53 km) north of Bourges at the junction of the D8, D30 and the D39 roads. The commune has a border with the department of Loiret. A canal was built here in the nineteenth century to ease drainage and provide transport links. The canal de Sauldre was last used commercially in the 1920s.

== Population ==
Historical population
Year	Pop.	±% p.a.
1968	1,007	—
1975	936	−1.04%
1982	1,070	+1.93%
1990	991	−0.95%
1999	995	+0.04%
2007	1,127	+1.57%
2012	1,142	+0.26%
2017	1,038	−1.89%
2023	998	−0.65%
Source: INSEE

== Sights ==
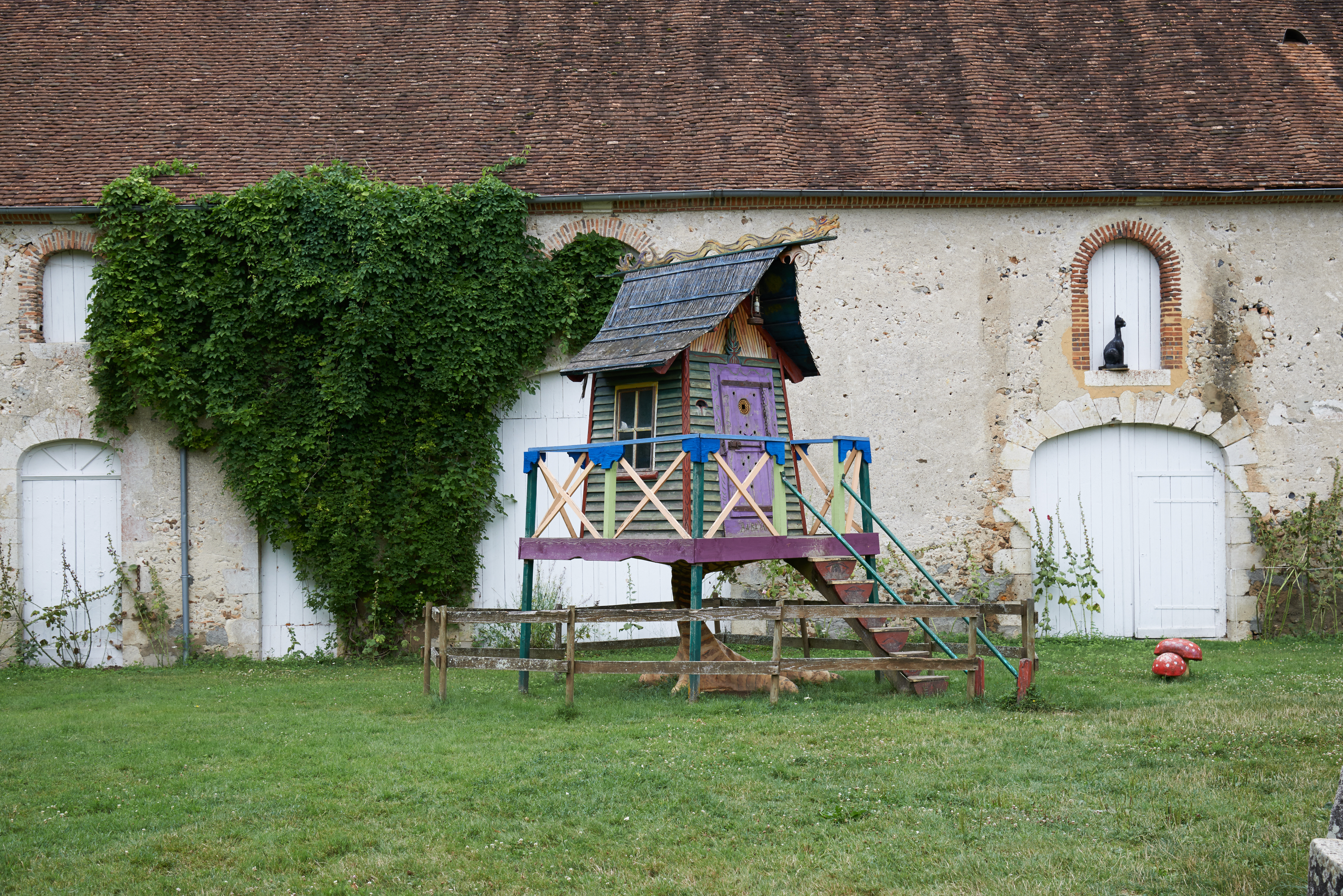
Museum of witchcraft

- The church of St. Andre, dating from the eleventh century.
- The twelfth-century chapel.
- The fifteenth-century chateau of Blancafort.
- The twelfth-century chateau de l'Hospital-du-Fresne.
- A museum of witchcraft.
- A public washhouse.

== See also ==
- Communes of the Cher department
