= Ivoy-le-Pré =

- Commune
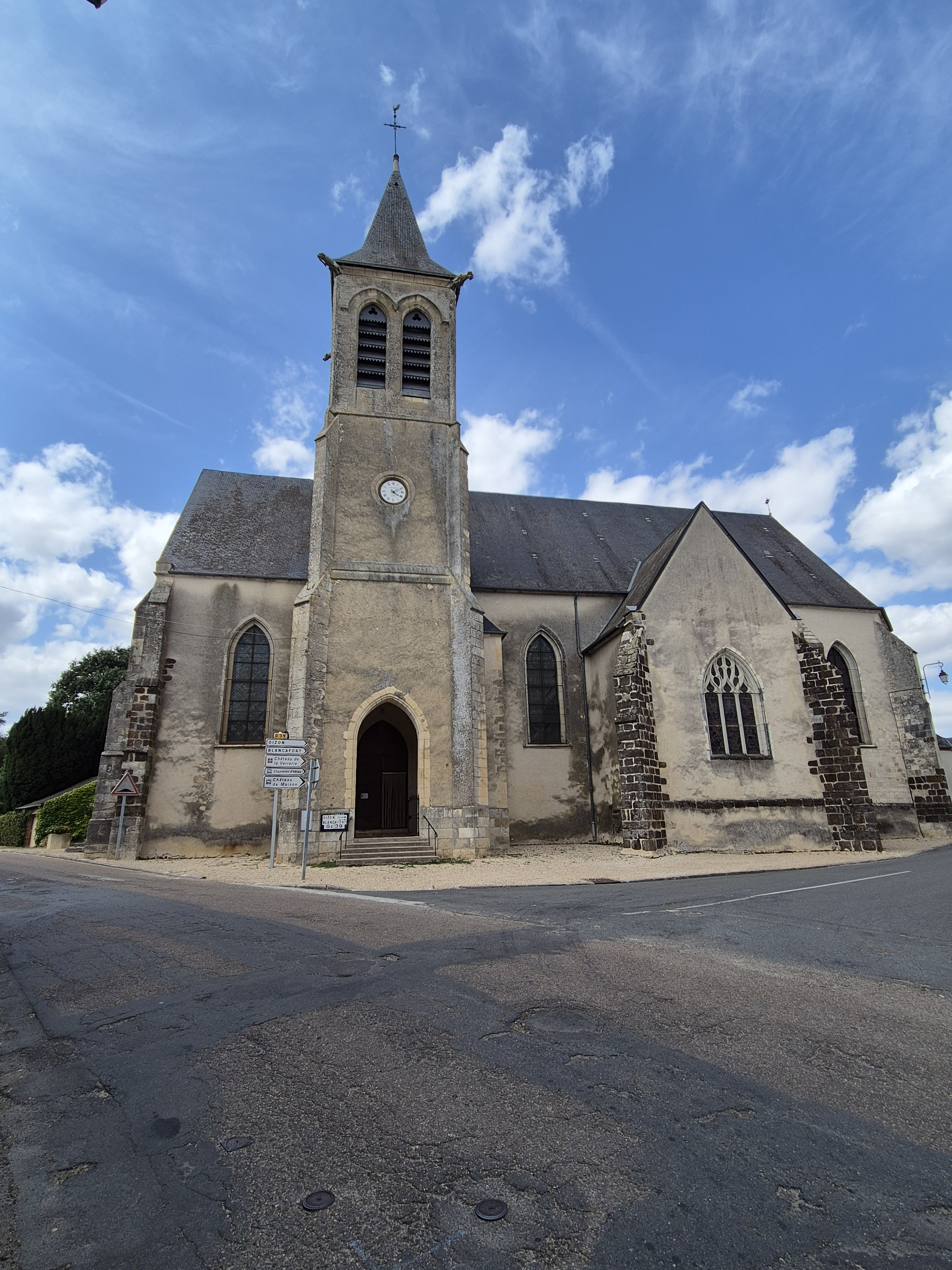
- Church

- Coat of arms
- Location of Ivoy-le-Pré
- Location within France Location within Centre-Val de Loire
- Coordinates: 47°20′45″N 2°29′16″E
- Country: France
- Region: Centre-Val de Loire
- Department: Cher
- Arrondissement: Vierzon
- Canton: Aubigny-sur-Nère
- Intercommunality: Sauldre et Sologne

Government
  - Mayor (2020–2026): David Dallois
- Area^{1}: 98.74 km^{2} (38.12 sq mi)
- Elevation: 270 m (890 ft)
- Highest elevation: 355 m (1,165 ft)
- Lowest elevation: 191 m (627 ft)
- Population (2023): 771
  - Density: 7.81/km^{2} (20.2/sq mi)
- Time zone: UTC+01:00 (CET)
  - Summer (DST): UTC+02:00 (CEST)
- INSEE/Postal code: 18115 /18380
- ^{1} French Land Register data, which excludes lakes, ponds, glaciers > 1 km^{2} (0.386 sq mi or 247 acres) and river estuaries.

Ivoy-le-Pré (French pronunciation: [ivwa lə pʁe]) is a commune in the Cher department in the Centre-Val de Loire region of France.

== Geography ==
An area of lakes, forestry and farming comprising the village and several hamlets situated in the valley of the petite Sauldre river, about 16 miles (26 km) north of Bourges at the junction of the D55, D12 and the D39 roads and on the D926.

== Population ==
Historical population
Year	Pop.	±% p.a.
1968	1,042	—
1975	856	−2.77%
1982	933	+1.24%
1990	807	−1.80%
1999	857	+0.67%
2007	864	+0.10%
2012	863	−0.02%
2017	803	−1.43%
2023	771	−0.68%
Source: INSEE

== Sights ==
- The church of St. Aignan, dating from the thirteenth century.
- The château d’Ivoy, dating from the seventeenth century.
- A disused watermill.

== Personalities ==
- Nicolas Leblanc, chemist, was born here on 6 December 1742.
- Félix Millet, born here in 1844, was the inventor of an early motorbike, the motocyclette.
- Rémy Chauvin, biologist and entomologist lived here at the château in the 1990s.

== See also ==
- Communes of the Cher department
