= Ménétréol-sur-Sauldre =

- Commune
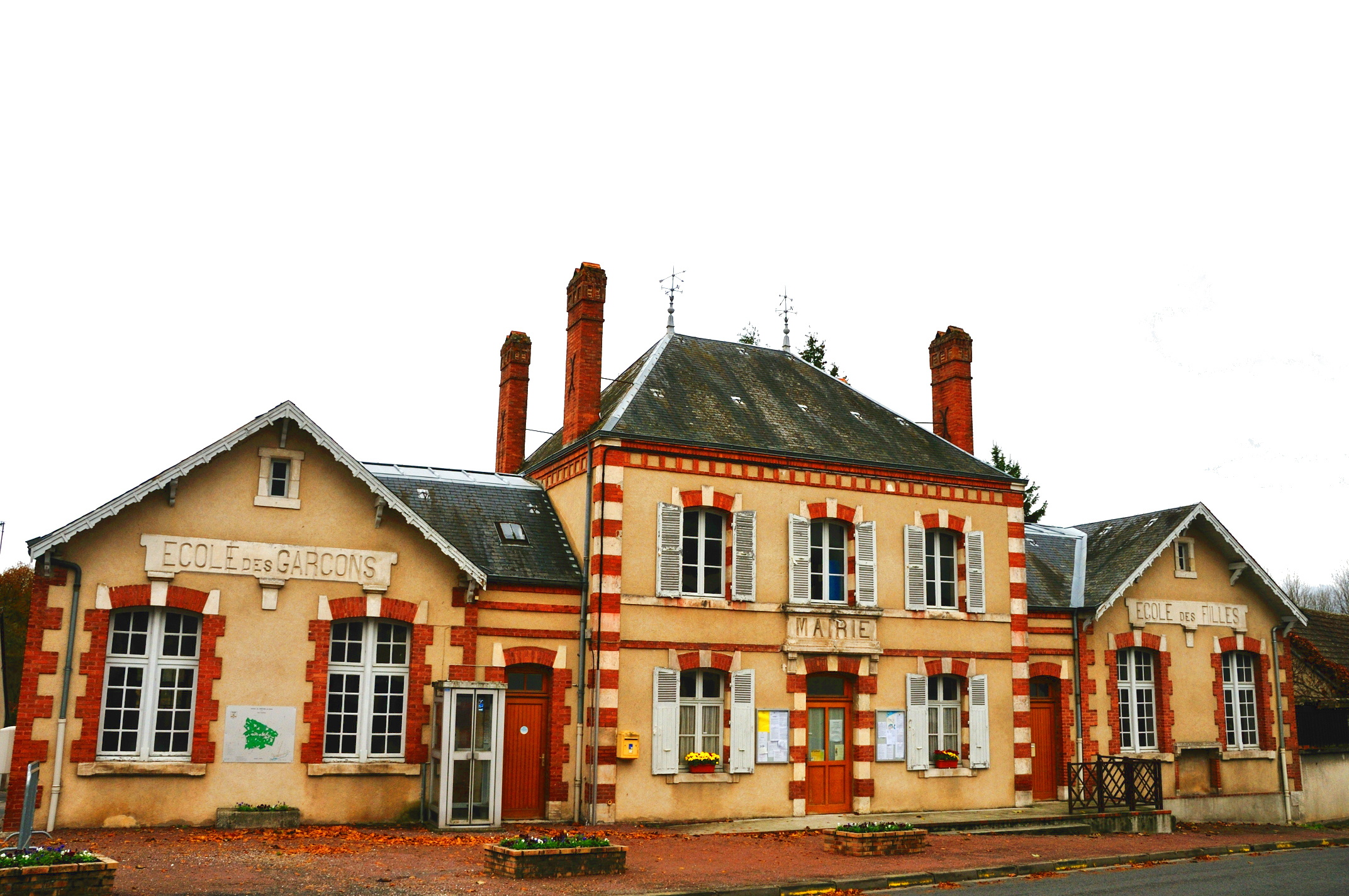
- Town hall and school
- Location of Ménétréol-sur-Sauldre
- Location within France Location within Centre-Val de Loire
- Coordinates: 47°26′56″N 2°18′31″E
- Country: France
- Region: Centre-Val de Loire
- Department: Cher
- Arrondissement: Vierzon
- Canton: Aubigny-sur-Nère
- Intercommunality: Sauldre et Sologne

Government
  - Mayor (2020–2026): Bernardino Addiego
- Area^{1}: 50.08 km^{2} (19.34 sq mi)
- Elevation: 152 m (499 ft)
- Highest elevation: 183 m (600 ft)
- Lowest elevation: 131 m (430 ft)
- Population (2023): 202
  - Density: 4.03/km^{2} (10.4/sq mi)
- Time zone: UTC+01:00 (CET)
  - Summer (DST): UTC+02:00 (CEST)
- INSEE/Postal code: 18147 /18700
- ^{1} French Land Register data, which excludes lakes, ponds, glaciers > 1 km^{2} (0.386 sq mi or 247 acres) and river estuaries.

Ménétréol-sur-Sauldre (French pronunciation: [menetʁeɔl syʁ soldʁ], literally Ménétréol on Sauldre) is a commune in the Cher department in the Centre-Val de Loire region of France.

== Geography ==
An area of lakes, forestry and farming comprising the village and a hamlet situated in the valley of the petite Sauldre river, some 16 miles (26 km) north of Bourges at the junction of the D924, D12 and the D79 roads.

The Petite Sauldre flows westward through the middle of the commune; the village lies on its right bank. The Rère flows northwestward, then southwestward, through the heavily-wooded southern part of the commune.

== Population ==
Historical population
Year	Pop.	±% p.a.
1968	256	—
1975	250	−0.34%
1982	223	−1.62%
1990	229	+0.33%
1999	271	+1.89%
2007	251	−0.95%
2012	239	−0.98%
2017	212	−2.37%
2023	202	−0.80%
Source: INSEE

== Sights ==
- The church of St. Martin, dating from the nineteenth century.
- The remains of the castle of la Faye, dating from the thirteenth century.

== See also ==
- Communes of the Cher department
