= Brinon-sur-Sauldre =

- Commune
- Coat of arms
- Location of Brinon-sur-Sauldre
- Location within France Location within Centre-Val de Loire
- Coordinates: 47°33′56″N 2°15′21″E
- Country: France
- Region: Centre-Val de Loire
- Department: Cher
- Arrondissement: Vierzon
- Canton: Aubigny-sur-Nère
- Intercommunality: Sauldre et Sologne

Government
  - Mayor (2020–2026): Lionel Pointard
- Area^{1}: 116.3 km^{2} (44.9 sq mi)
- Elevation: 138 m (453 ft)
- Highest elevation: 162 m (531 ft)
- Lowest elevation: 118 m (387 ft)
- Population (2023): 971
  - Density: 8.35/km^{2} (21.6/sq mi)
- Time zone: UTC+01:00 (CET)
  - Summer (DST): UTC+02:00 (CEST)
- INSEE/Postal code: 18037 /18410
- ^{1} French Land Register data, which excludes lakes, ponds, glaciers > 1 km^{2} (0.386 sq mi or 247 acres) and river estuaries.

Brinon-sur-Sauldre (French pronunciation: [bʁinɔ̃ syʁ soldʁ], literally Brinon on Sauldre) is a commune in the Cher department in the Centre-Val de Loire region of France.

== Geography ==
A village of lakes, forestry and farming situated in the valley of the river Sauldre, some 31 miles (50 km) north of Bourges at the junction of the D234, D77 and the D923 roads. The commune has the Beuvron river forming its northern border with the department of Loir-et-Cher.

== Population ==
Historical population
Year	Pop.	±% p.a.
1968	1,332	—
1975	1,293	−0.42%
1982	1,249	−0.49%
1990	1,107	−1.50%
1999	1,089	−0.18%
2007	1,042	−0.55%
2012	1,006	−0.70%
2017	982	−0.48%
2023	971	−0.19%
Source: INSEE

== Sights ==
- The church of St. Barthélemy, dating from the eleventh century.
- Traces of a thirteenth-century castle at Launay.

== See also ==
- Communes of the Cher department
