= La Chapelle-d'Angillon =

- Commune
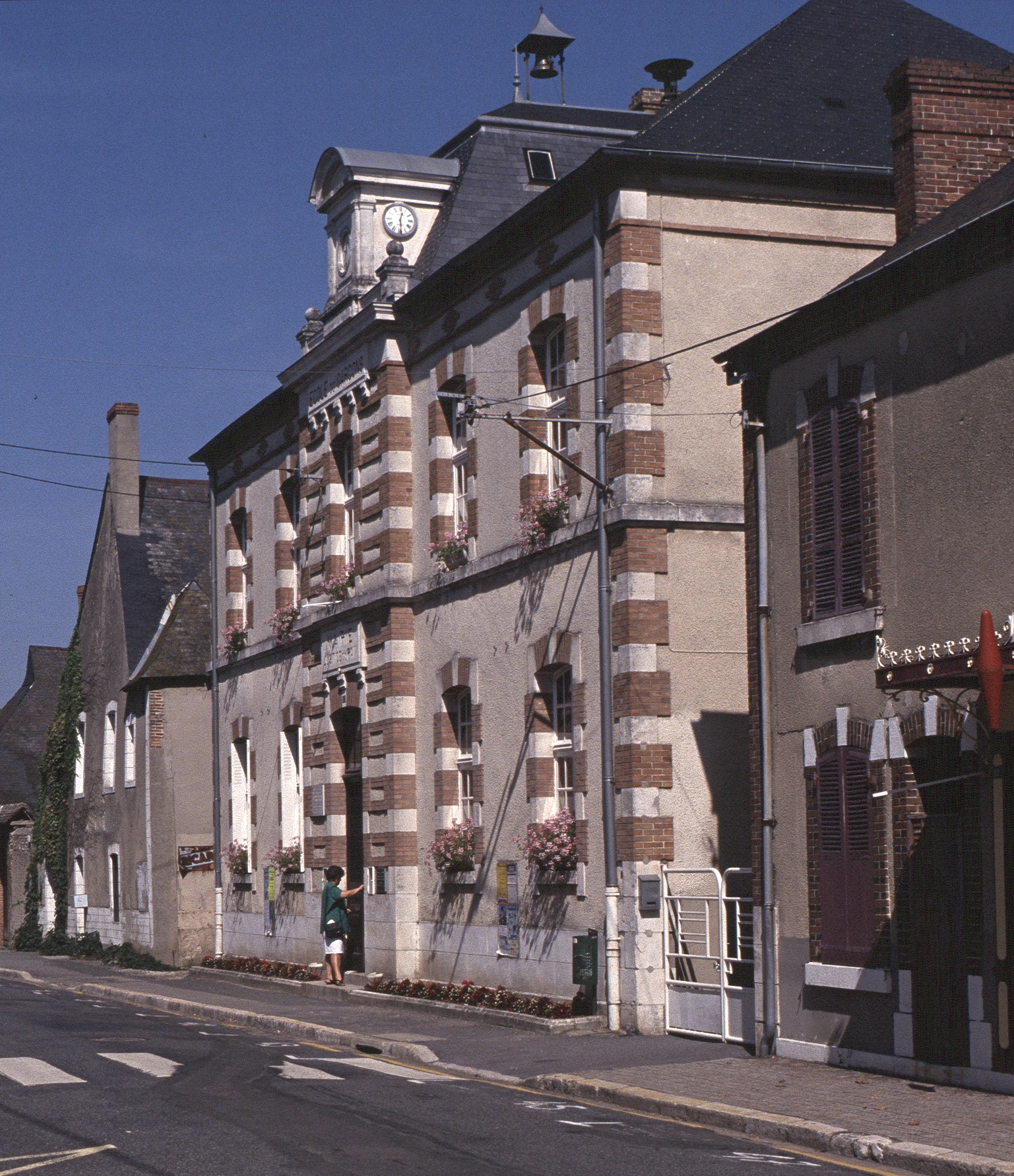
- The town hall and school in La Chapelle-d'Angillon

- Coat of arms
- Location of La Chapelle-d'Angillon
- Location within France Location within Centre-Val de Loire
- Coordinates: 47°21′51″N 2°26′02″E
- Country: France
- Region: Centre-Val de Loire
- Department: Cher
- Arrondissement: Vierzon
- Canton: Aubigny-sur-Nère
- Intercommunality: Sauldre et Sologne

Government
  - Mayor (2020–2026): Joël Coulon
- Area^{1}: 10.17 km^{2} (3.93 sq mi)
- Elevation: 192 m (630 ft)
- Highest elevation: 283 m (928 ft)
- Lowest elevation: 183 m (600 ft)
- Population (2023): 606
  - Density: 59.6/km^{2} (154/sq mi)
- Time zone: UTC+01:00 (CET)
  - Summer (DST): UTC+02:00 (CEST)
- INSEE/Postal code: 18047 /18380
- ^{1} French Land Register data, which excludes lakes, ponds, glaciers > 1 km^{2} (0.386 sq mi or 247 acres) and river estuaries.

La Chapelle-d'Angillon (French pronunciation: [la ʃapɛl dɑ̃ʒilɔ̃]) is a commune in the Cher department in the Centre-Val de Loire region of France.

== Geography ==
A village of lakes, forestry and farming situated in the valley of the river Sauldre, some 20 miles (32 km) north of Bourges at the junction of the D12, D940 and the D926 roads.

== Population ==
Historical population
Year	Pop.	±% p.a.
1968	727	—
1975	744	+0.33%
1982	756	+0.23%
1990	687	−1.19%
1999	667	−0.33%
2007	655	−0.23%
2012	663	+0.24%
2017	629	−1.05%
2023	606	−0.62%
Source: INSEE

== Personalities ==
- Alain-Fournier (Henri Alban-Fournier), writer, was born here on 3 October 1886.

== Sights ==
- The church, dating from the fifteenth century.
- The chateau of Béthune, with parts dating from the twelfth century.
- A museum, in the chateau, dedicated to Alain-Fournier.

== The city in the art ==
Realization of a sculpture by French artist from Albens Jean-Louis Berthod, in 2014. The board is a tribute to the book of Alain-Fournier, "Meaulnes the Great", but also to the missing persons of the Great War. Insite the board, we can admirate the "Chateau of La Chapelle-d'Angillon".

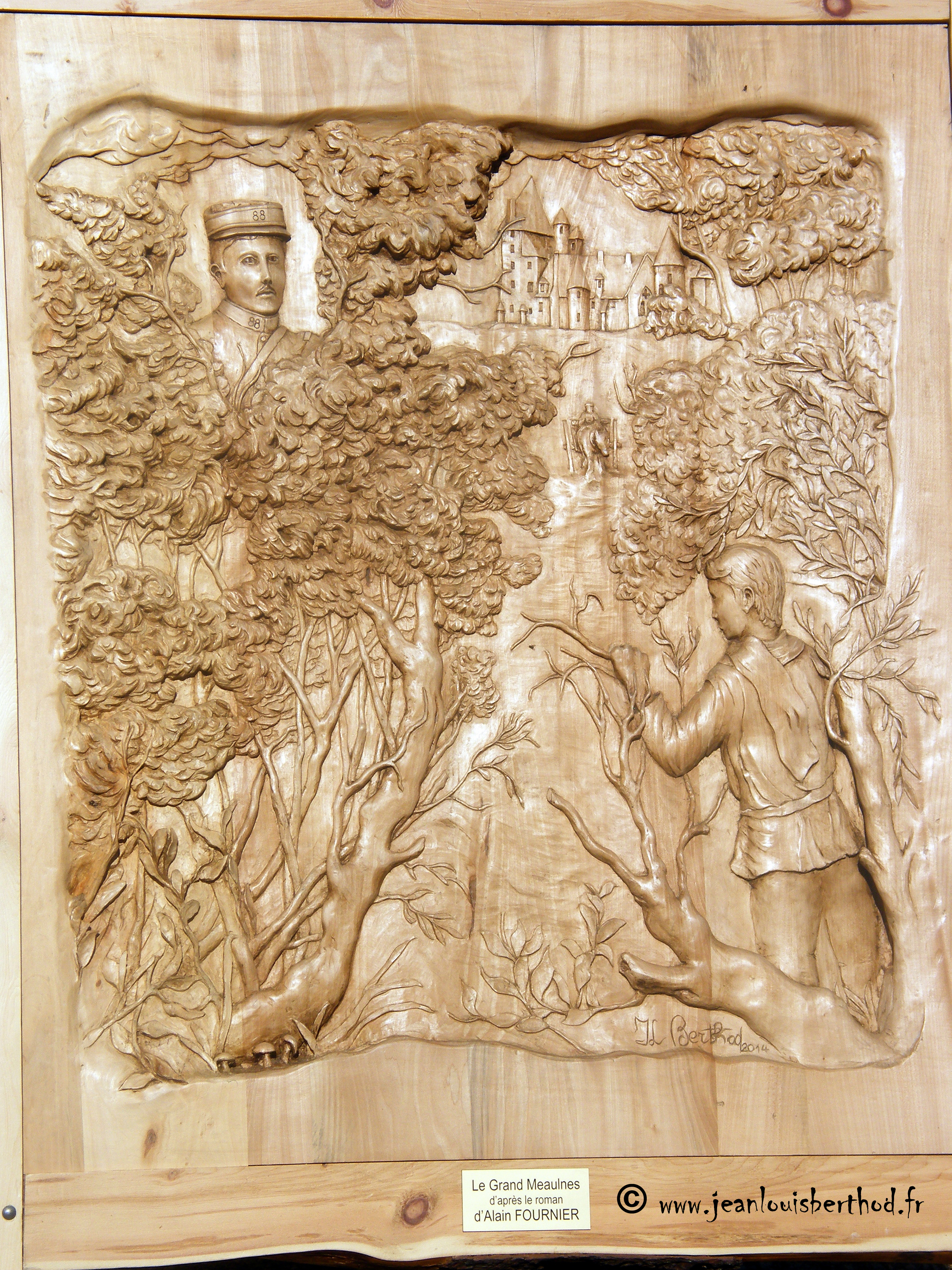
Sculpture "Le Grand Meaulnes"/"Meaulnes the Great" of Jean-Louis Berthod from Albens, France, realized in 2014

== See also ==
- Communes of the Cher department
