= Clémont =

- Commune
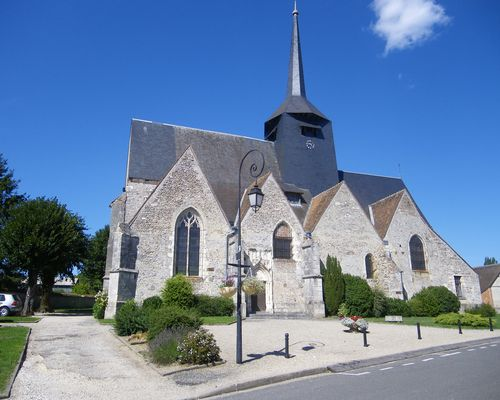
- The church in Clémont

- Coat of arms
- Location of Clémont
- Location within France Location within Centre-Val de Loire
- Coordinates: 47°34′08″N 2°18′29″E
- Country: France
- Region: Centre-Val de Loire
- Department: Cher
- Arrondissement: Vierzon
- Canton: Aubigny-sur-Nère
- Intercommunality: Sauldre et Sologne

Government
  - Mayor (2020–2026): Dominique Turpin
- Area^{1}: 50.11 km^{2} (19.35 sq mi)
- Elevation: 130 m (430 ft)
- Highest elevation: 168 m (551 ft)
- Lowest elevation: 134 m (440 ft)
- Population (2023): 687
  - Density: 13.7/km^{2} (35.5/sq mi)
- Time zone: UTC+01:00 (CET)
  - Summer (DST): UTC+02:00 (CEST)
- INSEE/Postal code: 18067 /18410
- ^{1} French Land Register data, which excludes lakes, ponds, glaciers > 1 km^{2} (0.386 sq mi or 247 acres) and river estuaries.

Clémont (French pronunciation: [klemɔ̃]) is a commune in the Cher department in the Centre-Val de Loire region of France.

== Geography ==
A village of lakes, forestry and farming situated in the valley of the river Sauldre, some 35 miles (56 km) north of Bourges at the junction of the D7, D79 and the D923 roads. The commune borders the department of Loiret.

== Population ==
Historical population
Year	Pop.	±% p.a.
1968	670	—
1975	665	−0.11%
1982	600	−1.46%
1990	631	+0.63%
1999	642	+0.19%
2007	665	+0.44%
2012	714	+1.43%
2017	719	+0.14%
2023	687	−0.76%
Source: INSEE

== Sights ==
- The church of St. Etienne, dating from the nineteenth century.
- The chateau of Lauroy, dating from the seventeenth century.

== See also ==
- Communes of the Cher department
