= Argent-sur-Sauldre =

- Commune
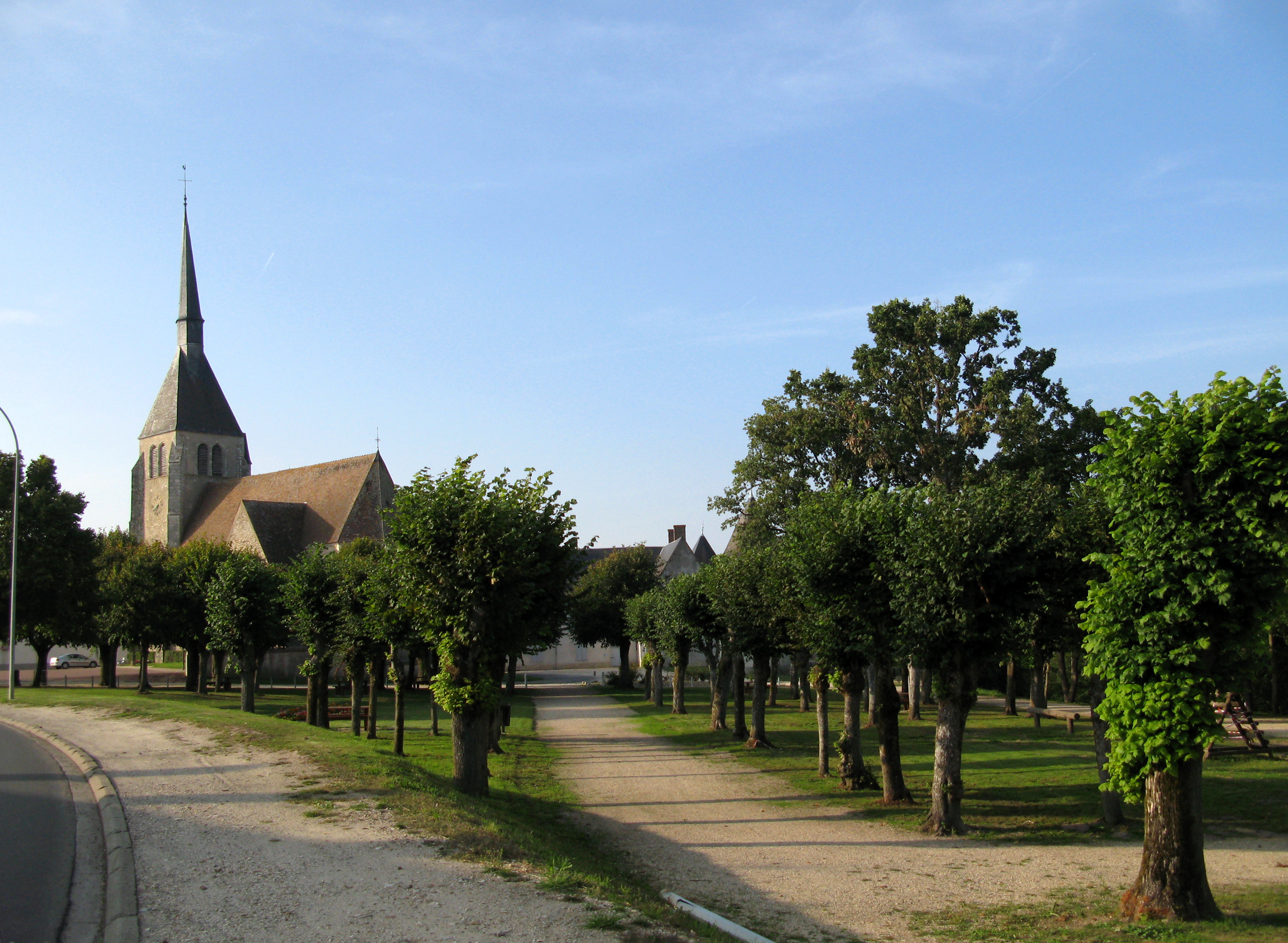
- The church seen from the D940 road

- Coat of arms
- Location of Argent-sur-Sauldre
- Location within France Location within Centre-Val de Loire
- Coordinates: 47°33′27″N 2°26′37″E
- Country: France
- Region: Centre-Val de Loire
- Department: Cher
- Arrondissement: Vierzon
- Canton: Aubigny-sur-Nère
- Intercommunality: Sauldre et Sologne

Government
  - Mayor (2023–2026): Anne Cassier
- Area^{1}: 67.35 km^{2} (26.00 sq mi)
- Elevation: 176 m (577 ft)
- Highest elevation: 210 m (690 ft)
- Lowest elevation: 144 m (472 ft)
- Population (2023): 2,023
  - Density: 30.04/km^{2} (77.80/sq mi)
- Time zone: UTC+01:00 (CET)
  - Summer (DST): UTC+02:00 (CEST)
- INSEE/Postal code: 18011 /18410
- ^{1} French Land Register data, which excludes lakes, ponds, glaciers > 1 km^{2} (0.386 sq mi or 247 acres) and river estuaries.

Argent-sur-Sauldre (French pronunciation: [aʁʒɑ̃ syʁ soldʁ], literally Argent on Sauldre) is a commune in the Cher department in the Centre-Val de Loire region of France in the valley of the river Sauldre, about 35 miles (56 km) north of Bourges on the border with the département of Loiret.

== Population ==
Historical population
Year	Pop.	±% p.a.
1968	2,614	—
1975	2,737	+0.66%
1982	2,687	−0.26%
1990	2,525	−0.77%
1999	2,502	−0.10%
2007	2,254	−1.30%
2012	2,156	−0.89%
2017	2,102	−0.51%
2023	2,023	−0.64%
Source: INSEE

== Place of interest ==
- The 15th-century château of Saint-Maur, rebuilt between 1776 and 1778 by architect Victor Louis.

== Notable people ==
- Théophile Moreux, astronomer, was born here on 20 November 1867.

== See also ==
- Communes of the Cher department
