= Arrondissements of the Cher department =

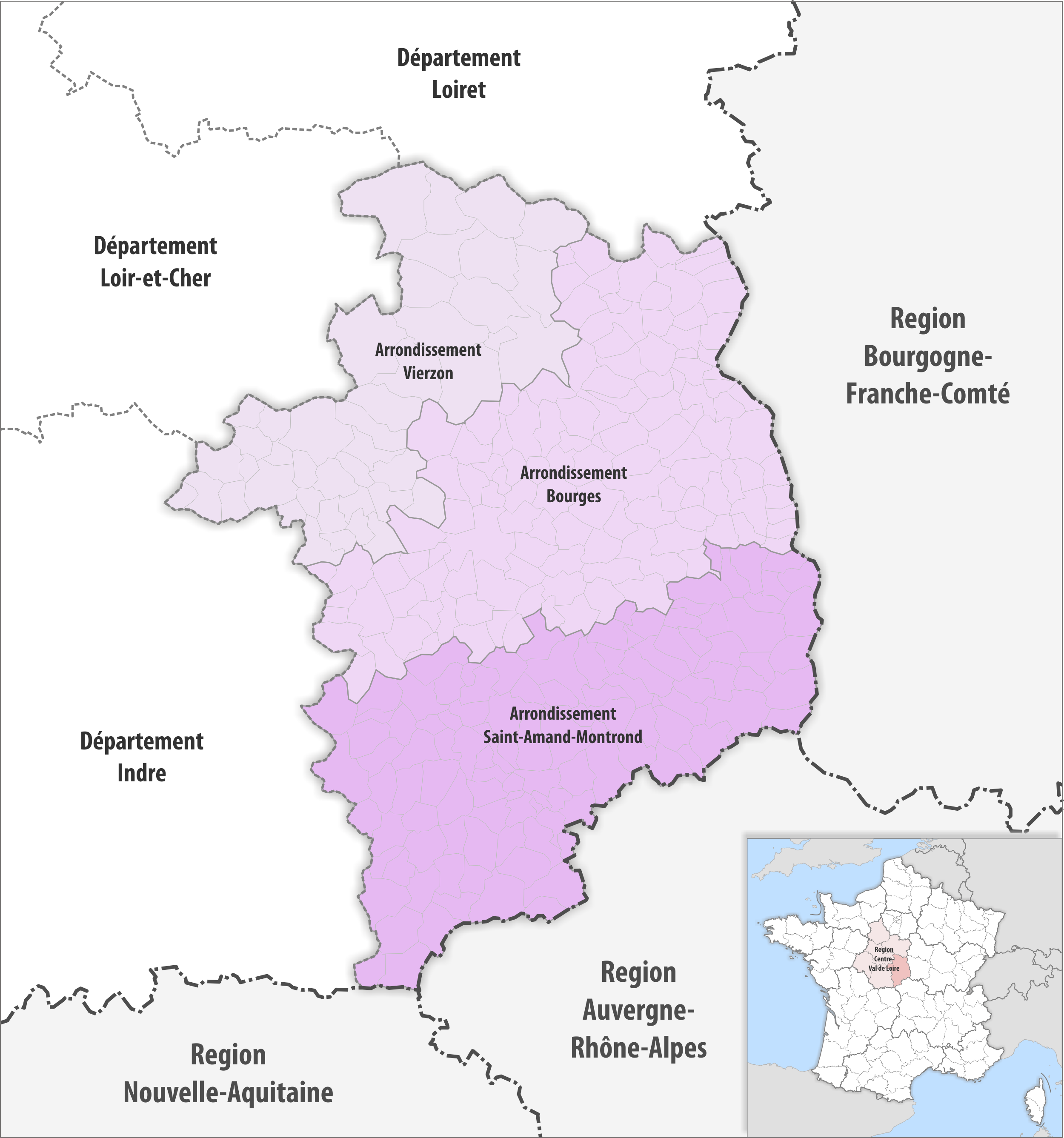
Map of arrondissements of the Cher department.

The 3 arrondissements of the Cher department are:

1. Arrondissement of Bourges, (prefecture of the Cher department: Bourges) with 128 communes. The population of the arrondissement was 170,322 in 2021.
2. Arrondissement of Saint-Amand-Montrond, (subprefecture: Saint-Amand-Montrond) with 115 communes. The population of the arrondissement was 61,114 in 2021.
3. Arrondissement of Vierzon, (subprefecture: Vierzon) with 43 communes. The population of the arrondissement was 68,137 in 2021.

== History ==
In 1800 the arrondissements of Bourges, Saint-Amand-Montrond and Sancerre were established. The arrondissement of Sancerre was disbanded in 1926. The arrondissement of Vierzon was created in 1984.
