= Canton of Les Aix-d'Angillon =

Coordinates: 47°11′56″N 2°34′21″E

Les Aix-d'Angillon
- Former canton
- Interactive map of Les Aix-d'Angillon
- Country: France
- Region: Centre-Val de Loire
- Department: Cher
- No. of communes: {{{nbcomm}}}
- Disbanded: 2015
- Area: 269.86 km^{2} (104.19 sq mi)
- Population (2012): 12,633
  - Density: 46.813/km^{2} (121.25/sq mi)

The Canton of Les Aix-d'Angillon is a former canton in the Cher département and in the Centre region of France. It was disbanded following the French canton reorganisation which came into effect in March 2015. It consisted of 12 communes, which joined the canton of Saint-Germain-du-Puy in 2015. It had 12,633 inhabitants (2012).

== Geography ==
A farming area in the arrondissement of Bourges. centred on the town of Les Aix-d'Angillon. The altitude varies from 126 metres (413 ft) at Saint-Germain-du-Puy to 427 metres (1,401 ft) at Morogues, averaging 182 metres (597 ft).

The canton comprised 12 communes:

- Les Aix-d'Angillon
- Aubinges
- Azy
- Brécy
- Morogues
- Parassy
- Rians
- Saint-Céols
- Saint-Germain-du-Puy
- Saint-Michel-de-Volangis
- Sainte-Solange
- Soulangis

== Population ==
Historical population Canton of Les Aix-d'Angillon
Year	1962	1968	1975	1982	1990	1999
Pop.	5,788	7,096	10,248	11,672	12,565	12,466
±%	—	+22.6%	+44.4%	+13.9%	+7.7%	−0.8%
From the year 1962 on: No double counting – residents of multiple communes (e.g. students and military personnel) are counted only once. Source: INSEE

== See also ==
- Arrondissements of the Cher department
- Cantons of the Cher department
- Communes of the Cher department
