= Communauté de communes des Hautes Terres en Haut Berry =

Hautes Terres en Haut Berry
- Former communauté de communes
- Country: France
- Region: Centre-Val de Loire
- Department: Cher
- No. of communes: {{{nbcomm}}}
- Established: 2003
- Disbanded: 2017
- Area: 203.42 km^{2} (78.54 sq mi)
- Population (1999): 4,277
  - Density: 21.03/km^{2} (54.46/sq mi)

The communauté de communes des Hautes Terres en Haut Berry was located in the Cher département of the Centre-Val de Loire region of France. It was created in January 2003. It was merged into the new Communauté de communes Terres du Haut Berry in January 2017.

== Member communes ==
It comprised the following 10 communes:

1. Achères
2. Aubinges
3. La Chapelotte
4. Henrichemont
5. Humbligny
6. Montigny
7. Morogues
8. Neuilly-en-Sancerre
9. Neuvy-Deux-Clochers
10. Saint-Céols
