= Communauté de communes des Terroirs d'Angillon =

Terroirs d'Angillon
- Former communauté de communes
- Country: France
- Region: Centre-Val de Loire
- Department: Cher
- No. of communes: {{{nbcomm}}}
- Established: 2001
- Disbanded: 2017
- Area: 201.30 km^{2} (77.72 sq mi)
- Population (1999): 6,939
  - Density: 34.47/km^{2} (89.28/sq mi)

The communauté de communes des Terroirs d’Angillon was created on December 29, 2000, and is located in the Cher département of the Centre-Val de Loire region of France. It was created in January 2001. It was merged into the new Communauté de communes Terres du Haut Berry in January 2017.

The Communauté de communes comprised the following communes:

1. Les Aix-d'Angillon
2. Azy
3. Brécy
4. Moulins-sur-Yèvre
5. Parassy
6. Rians
7. Sainte-Solange
8. Soulangis
