= Canton of Henrichemont =

Coordinates: 47°18′13″N 2°31′30″E

Henrichemont
- Former canton
- Interactive map of Henrichemont
- Country: France
- Region: Centre-Val de Loire
- Department: Cher
- No. of communes: {{{nbcomm}}}
- Disbanded: 2015
- Area: 158.58 km^{2} (61.23 sq mi)
- Population (2012): 3,465
  - Density: 21.85/km^{2} (56.59/sq mi)

The canton of Henrichemont was a canton situated in the Cher département and in the Centre region of France. It was disbanded following the French canton reorganisation which came into effect in March 2015. In 2012, it had 3,465 inhabitants.

== Geography ==
The canton encompassed a farming and forestry area in the arrondissement of Bourges, centered around the town of Henrichemont. The altitude varies from 191m in Montigny to 428m in Humbligny, with a mean altitude of 290m.

The canton comprised 7 communes:

- Achères
- La Chapelotte
- Henrichemont
- Humbligny
- Montigny
- Neuilly-en-Sancerre
- Neuvy-Deux-Clochers

== Population ==
Historical population Canton of Henrichemont
Year	1962	1968	1975	1982	1990	1999
Pop.	3,433	3,961	3,656	3,519	3,408	3,411
±%	—	+15.4%	−7.7%	−3.7%	−3.2%	+0.1%
From the year 1962 on: No double counting – residents of multiple communes (e.g. students and military personnel) are counted only once. Source: INSEE

== See also ==
- Arrondissements of the Cher department
- Cantons of the Cher department
- Communes of the Cher department
