= Colin (river) =

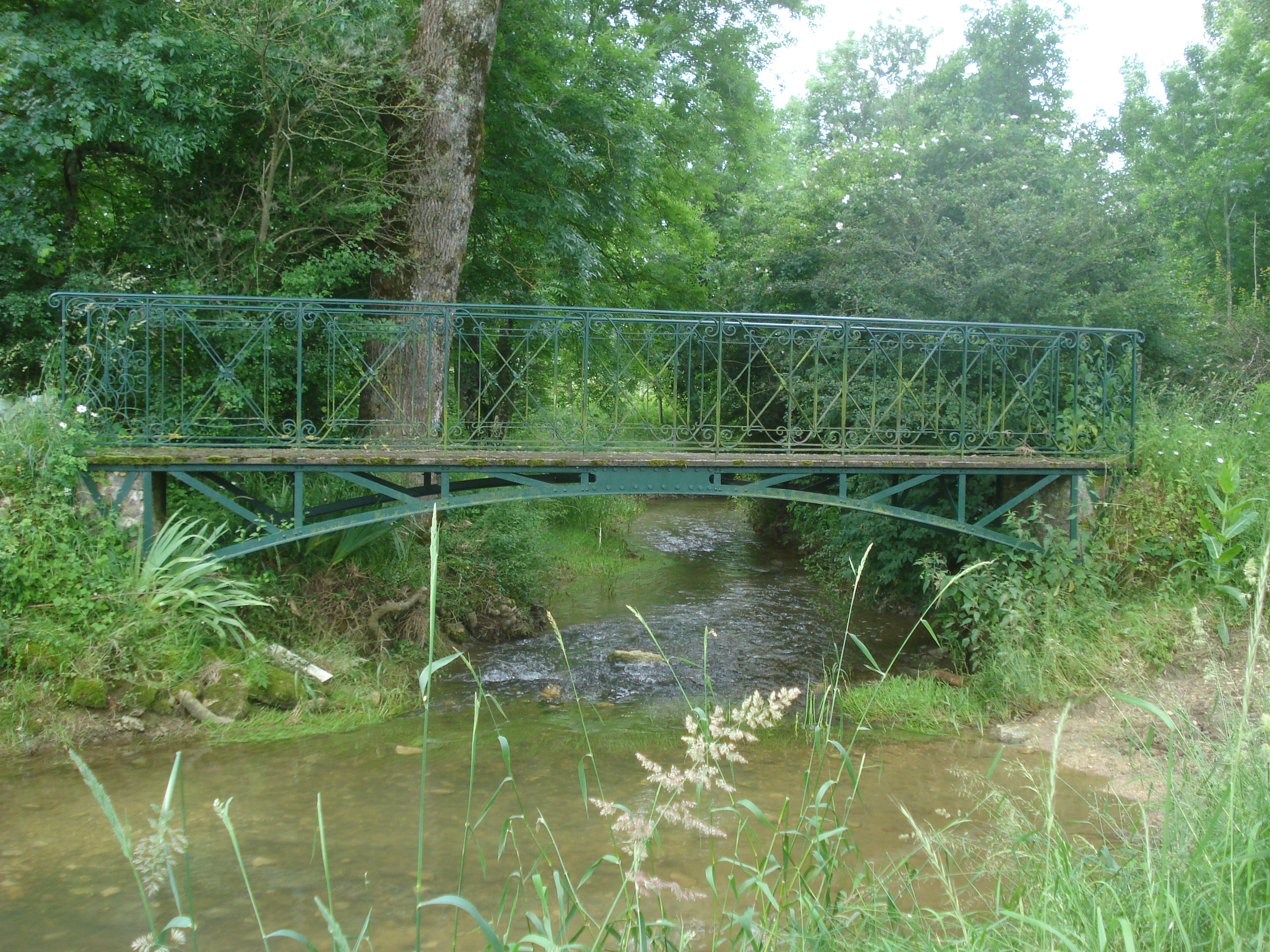
- River at Sainte-Solange

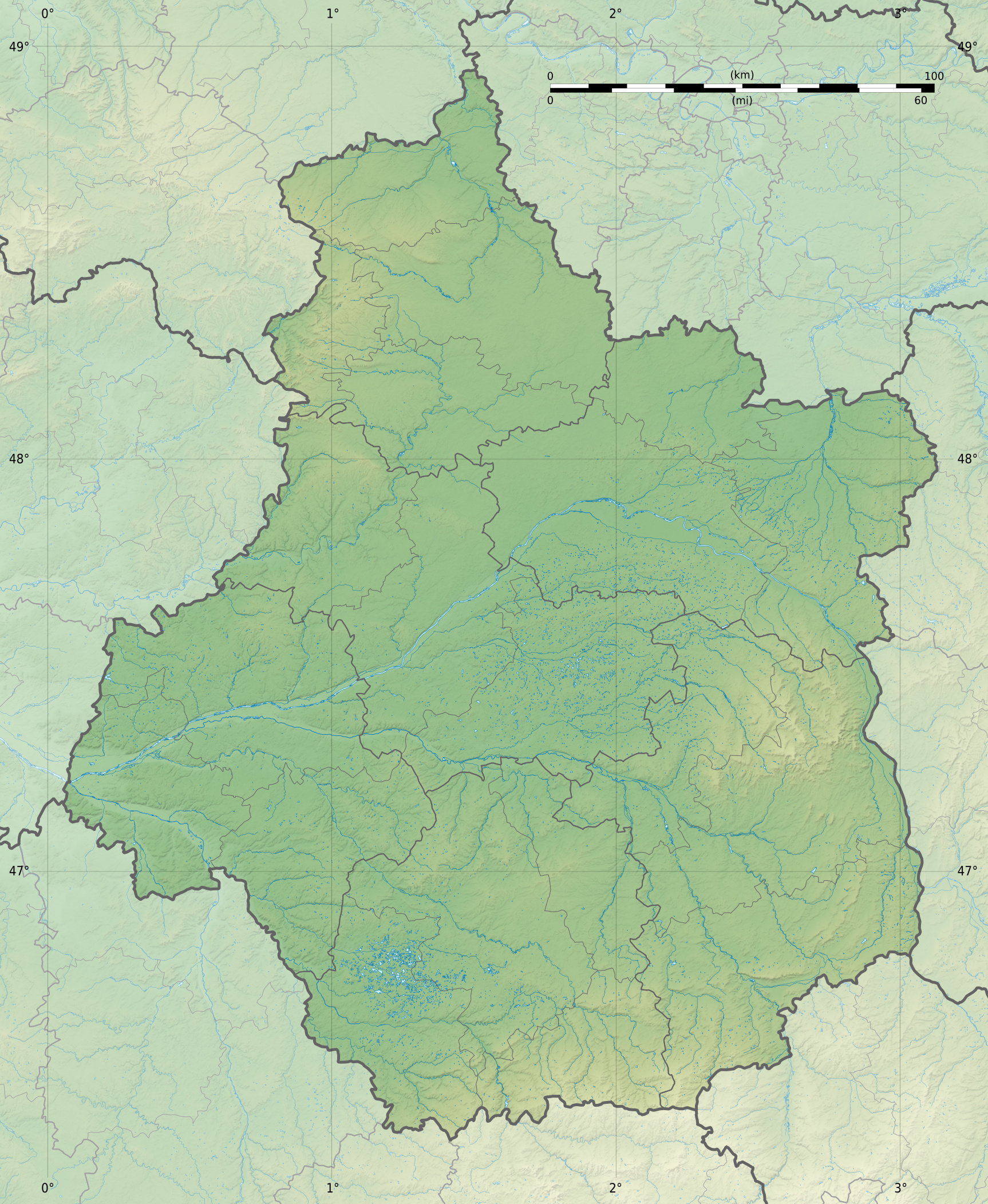
- Location within France Location within Centre-Val de Loire

Location
- Country: France

Physical characteristics
- Source
  - location: Humbligny
- Mouth
  - location: Yèvre
  - coordinates: 47.0925°N 2.4696°E
- Length: 29.1 km (18.1 mi)

Basin features
- Progression: Yèvre→ Cher→ Loire→ Atlantic Ocean

The Colin (French pronunciation: [kɔlɛ̃]) is a 29.1 km (18.1 mi) long river in the department of Cher in central France. It is a tributary of the Yèvre, its waters eventually reaching the sea through the river Loire.

== Geography ==
The river's source is at Humbligny, where it drains La Motte d'Humbligny, the highest point in the Sancerrois region. It runs through Les Aix-d'Angillon and Sainte-Solange and joins the Yèvre at Saint-Germain-du-Puy.

== Communes ==
Humbligny, Morogues, Aubinges, Les Aix-d'Angillon, Sainte-Solange, Saint-Germain-du-Puy,
