= Faisselle =

French cheese

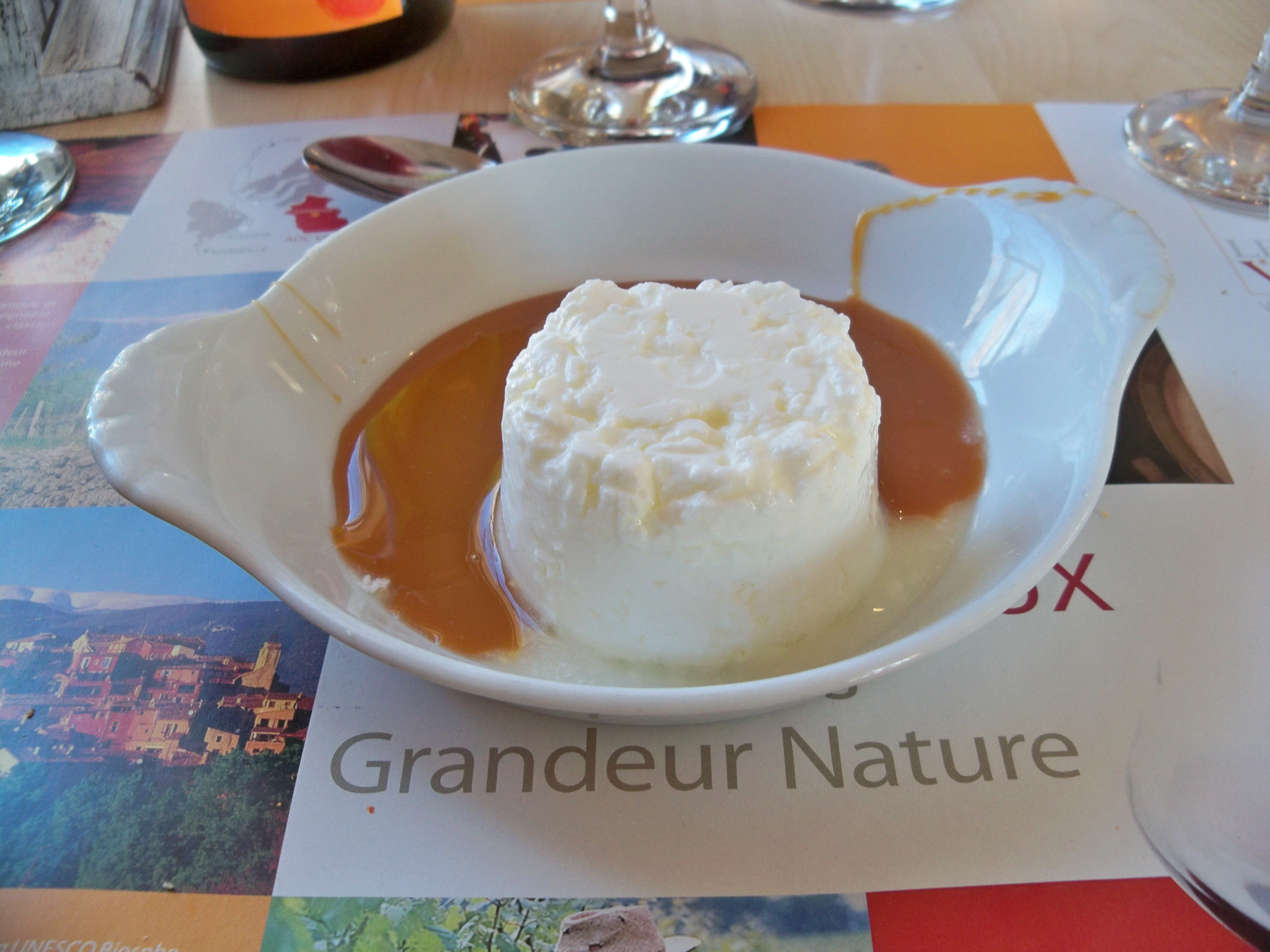
- Faisselle with confiture de lait
- Country of origin: France
- Region: Rians, Berry
- Source of milk: Cows; Goats; Sheep
- Pasteurized: Not traditionally
- Texture: Very soft
- Fat content: 6%
- Weight: 500 g (18 oz) to 1 kg (2.2 lb)

Faisselle (French pronunciation: [fɛsɛl]) is a non-protected French cheese made of raw milk from cows, goats, or sheep. The name comes from the mold in which the cheese is strained: faisselle.

== Production ==
Faisselle is traditionally produced in the centre of France, but because its name is not protected, it can be produced anywhere else in the country. The cheese produced elsewhere uses pasteurized milk to make it appealing to a wider customer base.

== Composition ==
The cheese is traditionally made from raw milk from cows, goats, or sheep, and is between 500 g (18 oz) and 1 kg (2.2 lb) on average.

== Consumption ==
Faisselle is often eaten as a sweet dessert, served with sugar or honey. In the region around Lyon, it is also served as a savoury starter or appetizer, with chives and shallots (called Cervelle de canut). It is used as an ingredient in a number of dessert dishes, including cakes and tarts.

== See also ==
- List of French cheeses
- Clabber
- Cottage cheese
- Curd
- Farmer cheese
- Fromage blanc
- Leben
- Quark
- Queso blanco
