= Maximilien de Béthune, Duke of Sully =

17th-century French soldier and politician

Prince of Sully Maximilien de Béthune GMA
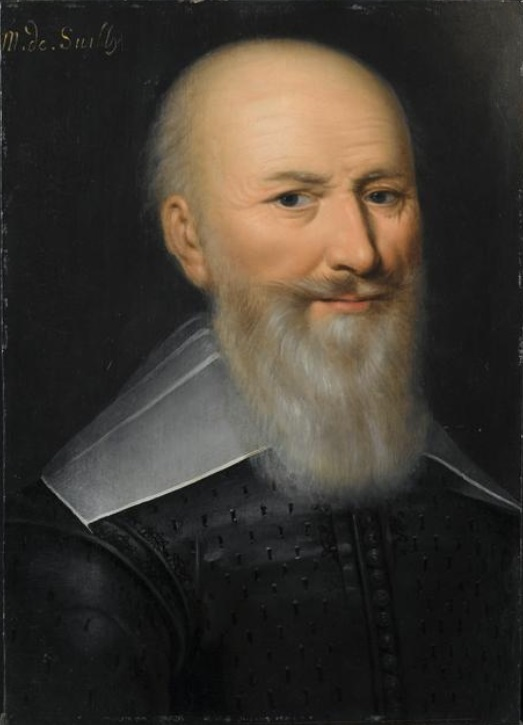
- Maximilien de Béthune in 1630

Chief Minister of France
- In office 2 August 1589 – 29 January 1611
- Monarchs: Henry IV; Louis XIII
- Succeeded by: Nicolas de Neufville

Superintendent of Finances
- In office 1600 – 26 January 1611
- Monarchs: Henry IV; Louis XIII
- Preceded by: Henry I of Montmorency (first of a council)
- Succeeded by: Pierre Jeannin (first of a council)

Personal details
- Born: 13 December 1560 Rosny-sur-Seine, France
- Died: 22 December 1641 (aged 81) Villebon, France
- Spouses: Anne de Courtenay (m. 1583; died 1589) Rachel de Cochefilet (m. 1592; died 1641)
- Children: Maximilien; François; Marguerite; Louise
- Parent(s): François de Béthune and Charlotte Dauvet

Military service
- Allegiance: Kingdom of France
- Branch/service: Royal Army
- Years of service: 1576–1598
- Rank: Marshal of France
- Battles/wars: French Wars of Religion (1562–1598): Battle of Coutras; Battle of Arques; Battle of Ivry; Siege of Amiens; Franco-Savoyard War (1600–1601): Rohan Wars (1621–1629): Surrender of Montauban; Siege of La Rochelle

Maximilien de Béthune Sully, 1st Prince of Sully, Marquis of Rosny and Nogent, Count of Muret and Villebon, Viscount of Meaux (13 December 1560 – 22 December 1641) was a French nobleman, soldier, statesman, and counselor of King Henry IV of France. Historians emphasize Sully's role in building a strong, centralized administrative system in France using coercion and highly effective new administrative techniques. While not all of his policies were original, he used them well to revitalize France after the European wars of religion. Most, however, were repealed by later monarchs who preferred absolute power. Historians have also studied his Neostoicism and his ideas about virtue, prudence, and discipline.

== Biography ==
=== Early years ===
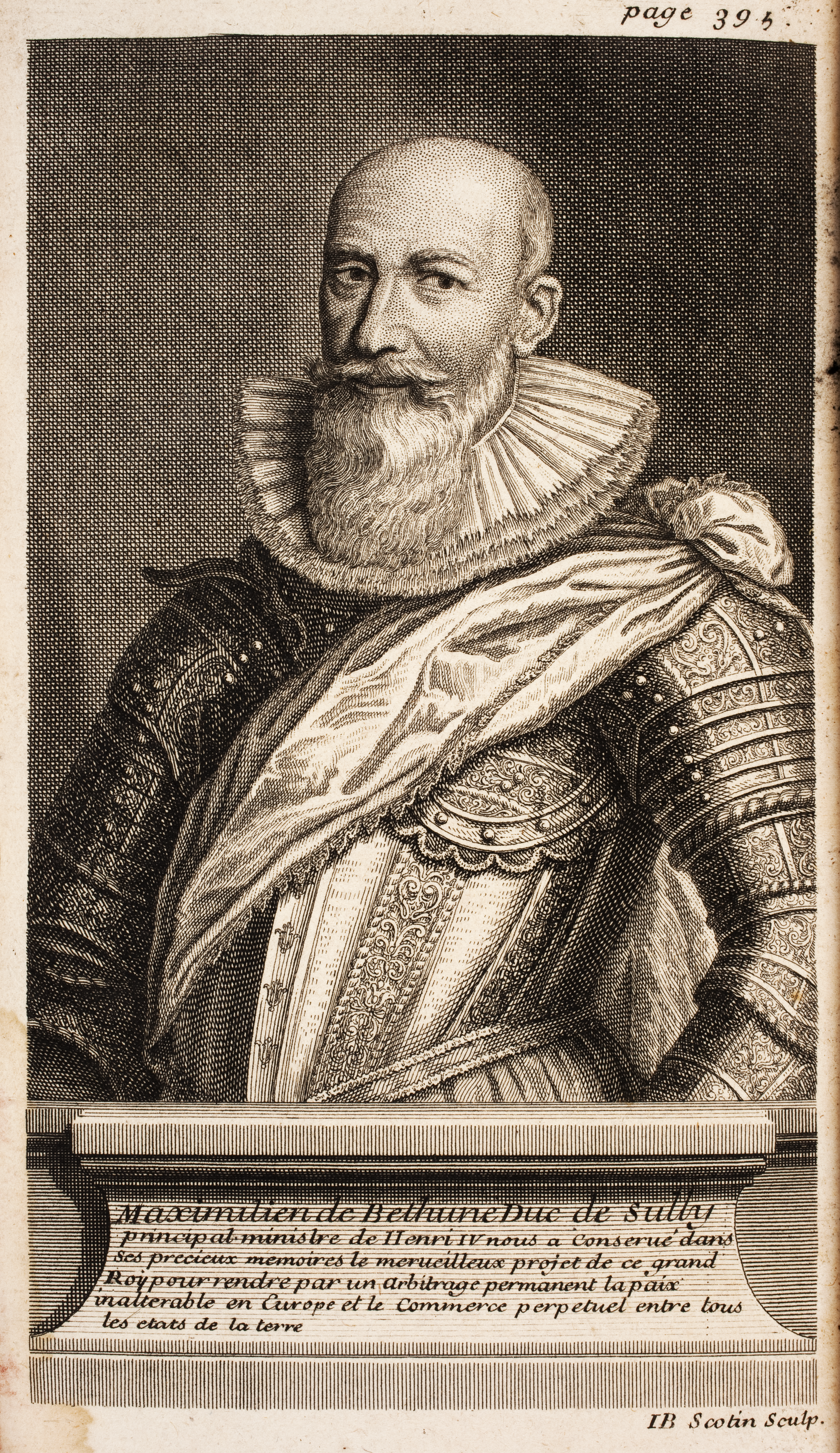
Maximilien de Béthune

He was born at the Château de Rosny near Mantes-la-Jolie into a branch of the House of Béthune a noble family originating in Artois, and was brought up in the Reformed faith, a Huguenot. In 1571, at the age of eleven, Maximilien was presented to Henry of Navarre and remained permanently attached to the future king of France. The young Baron of Rosny was taken to Paris by his patron and was studying at the Collège de Bourgogne at the time of the St Bartholomew's Day Massacre, from which he escaped by discreetly carrying a Catholic book of hours under his arm. He studied mathematics and history at the court of Henry of Navarre.

=== A warrior with Henry ===
On the renewed outbreak of civil war in 1575, he enlisted in the Protestant army. In 1576 he accompanied the Duke of Anjou, younger brother of king Henri III, on an expedition into the Netherlands in order to regain the former Rosny estates, but being unsuccessful he attached himself for a time to the Prince of Orange. Later, rejoining Henry of Navarre in Guyenne, he displayed bravery in the field and particular ability as a military engineer. In 1583 he acted as Henry's special agent in Paris, and during a respite in the Wars of Religion he married an heiress who died five years later.

On the renewal of civil war, Rosny again joined Henry of Navarre, and at the battle of Ivry (1590) he was seriously wounded. He counselled Henry IV's conversion to Catholicism (made official on 25 July 1593) but steadfastly refused to become a Catholic himself. Once Henry IV of France's succession to the throne was secured (c. 1594), the faithful and trusted Rosny received his reward in the shape of numerous estates and dignities.

=== Sully in power ===
From 1596, when he was added to Henry's finance commission, Rosny introduced some order into France's economic affairs. Acting as sole Superintendent of Finances at the end of 1601, he authorized the free exportation of grain and wine, reduced legal interest, established a special court to try cases of speculation, forbade provincial governors to raise money on their own authority, and otherwise removed many abuses of tax collecting. Rosny abolished several offices, and by his honest, rigorous conduct of the country's finances, he was able to save an average of a million livres a year between 1600 and 1610.

His achievements were not solely financial. In 1599, he was appointed grand commissioner of highways and public works, superintendent of fortifications and grand master of artillery; in 1602, governor of Nantes and of Jargeau, captain-general of the Queen's gens d'armes and governor of the Bastille; in 1604, he was governor of Poitou; and in 1606, made first duke of Sully and a pair de France, ranking next to princes of the blood. He declined the office of constable of France because he would not become a Catholic.

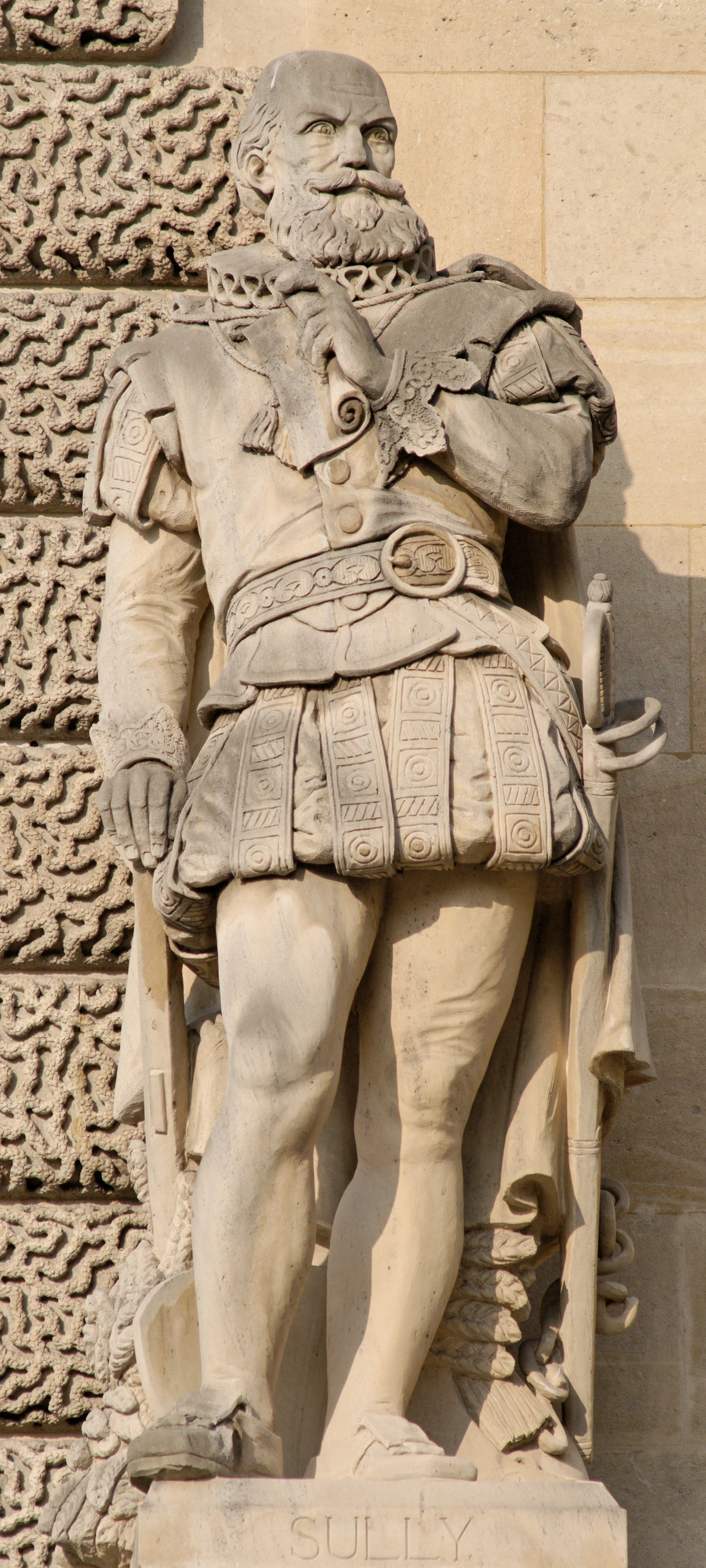
Statue of Sully at the Palais du Louvre, Paris

Sully encouraged agriculture, urged the free circulation of produce, promoted stock-raising, forbade the destruction of the forests, drained swamps, built roads and bridges, planned a vast system of canals and actually began the Canal de Briare. He strengthened the French military establishment; under his direction, the construction of a great line of defences on the frontiers began. Abroad, Sully opposed the king's colonial policy as inconsistent with French interests, in opposition to men like Samuel Champlain who urged greater colonial efforts in Canada and elsewhere. Neither did Sully show much favor toward industrial pursuits but, on the urgent solicitation of the king, he established a few silk factories. He fought together with Henry IV in Savoy (1600–1601) and negotiated the treaty of peace in 1602. In 1603, he represented Henry at the court of James I of England, and arranged gifts of jewellery for influential courtiers. Throughout the reign of Henry IV, he helped the king to put down insurrections of the nobles, whether Catholic or Protestant. It was Sully, too, who arranged the marriage between Henry IV and Marie de' Medici.

=== Fall from power and last years ===
The political role of Sully effectively ended with the assassination of Henry IV on 14 May 1610. The king was on his way to visit Sully, who lay ill in the Arsenal; his purpose was to make final preparations for imminent military intervention in the disputed succession to Jülich-Cleves-Berg after the death of Duke John William. The intervention on behalf of a Calvinist candidate would have brought the king in conflict with the Catholic Habsburg dynasty.

After the death of Henry IV Sully published, in the deceased king's name, his ‘Grand Design’, a plan to stop the religious wars. His starting point was that the three churches (Catholic, Lutheran and Calvinist) were there to stay. He planned an international organization, consisting of a Europe of 15 more or less equally strong powers, incidentally dissolving the Habsburg empire and thus making France Europe's strongest state. A balance of power mechanism and a permanent assembly of ambassadors should prevent wars in Europe. Military power would only be needed towards the Muslim Ottoman Empire.

Although a member of the Queen's council of regency, his colleagues were not inclined to put up with his domineering leadership, and after a stormy debate he resigned as superintendent of finances on 26 January 1611, retiring into private life.

The queen mother gave him 300,000 livres for his long services and confirmed him in possession of his estates. He attended the meeting of the Estates-General in 1614, and on the whole was in sympathy with the policy and government of Richelieu. He disavowed the Blockade of La Rochelle, in 1621, but in the following year was briefly arrested.

The baton of marshal of France was conferred on him on 18 September 1634. The last years of his life were spent chiefly at Villebon, Rosny and his château of Sully. He died at Villebon at the age of 81.

== Family ==
By his first wife, Anne de Courtenay (1564–1589), daughter of François, Lord of Bontin, he had one son, Maximilien, Marquess of Rosny (1587–1634), who led a life of dissipation and debauchery. By his second wife, Rachel de Cochefilet (1566–1659), the widow of François Hurault, Lord of Chateaupers, whom he married in 1592 and who turned Protestant to please him, he had nine children, of whom six died young. Their son François (1598–1678) was created first Duke of Orval. The elder daughter Marguerite (1595–1660) in 1605, married Henri, Duke of Rohan, while the younger Louise in 1620 married Alexandre de Lévis, Marquess of Mirepoix.

His brother, Philippe de Béthune, was sent as ambassador to James VI of Scotland in May 1599. He was given a good welcome and invited to Falkland Palace. He went on a progress with James VI to Inchmurrin and Hamilton Palace, after the king had written to the Laird of Wemyss for the loan of his best hackney horse and saddle.

== Accomplishments ==
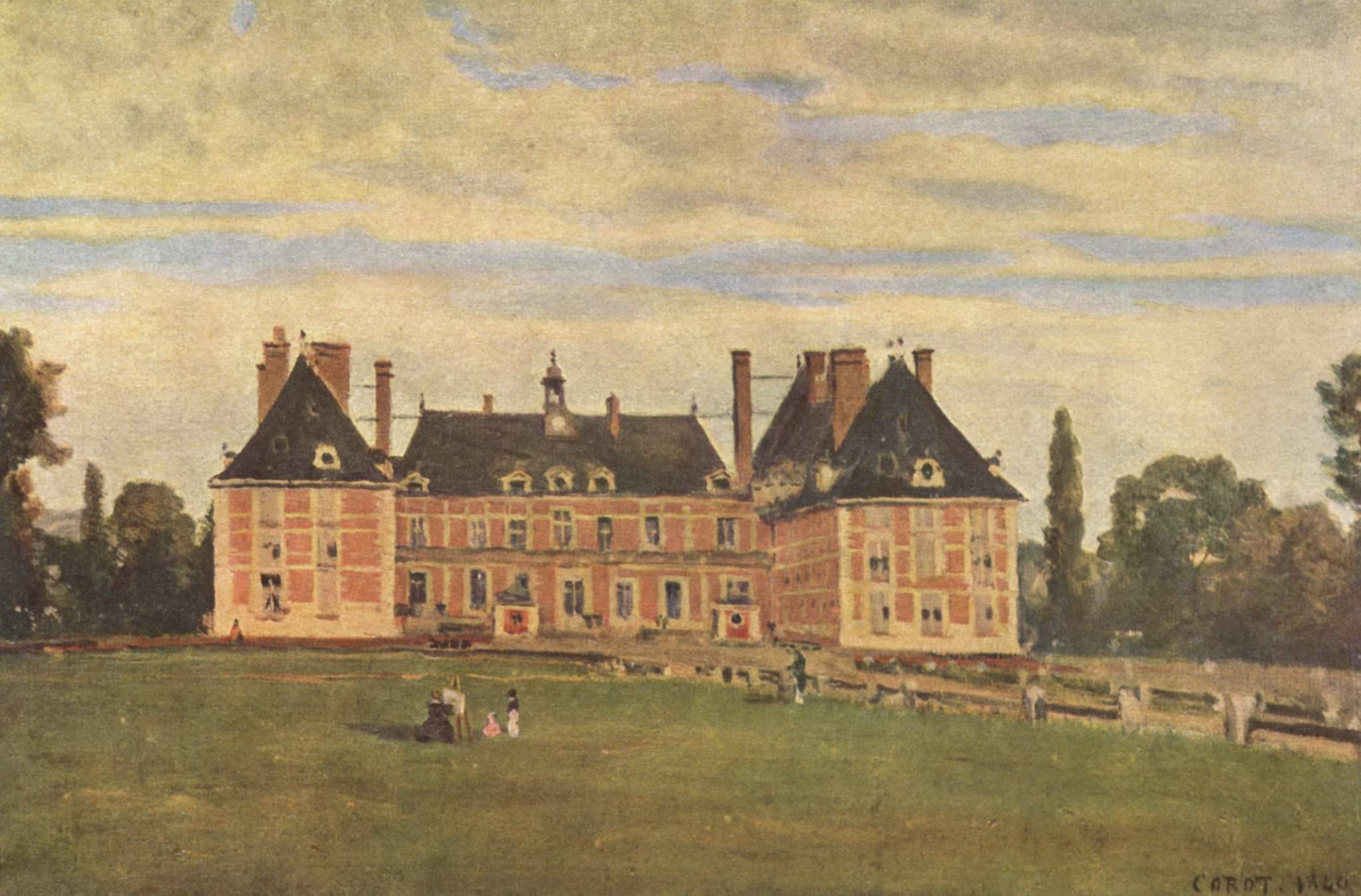
Château de Rosny-sur-Seine, the stately home built by Duc de Sully

Sully was unpopular because he was a favorite and was seen as selfish, obstinate, and rude. He was hated by most Catholics because he was a Protestant, and by most Protestants because he was faithful to the king. He amassed a large personal fortune, and his jealousy of other ministers and favorites was extravagant. Nevertheless, he was a businessman, inexorable in punishing malversation and dishonesty on the part of others, and opposed to court expenditures that was the bane of almost all European monarchies in his day. He was gifted with executive ability, with confidence and resolution, with fondness for work, and above all with deep devotion to his master. He was trusted by Henry IV and proved himself an able assistant of the king in dispelling the chaos into which the religious and civil wars had plunged France. After Henry IV, Sully was a driving force behind the transformation in France between 1598 and 1610, in which agriculture and commerce benefitted, and peace and internal order were reestablished.

== Titles ==
During his life, Sully inherited or acquired the following titles:

- Duke of Sully
- Peer of France
- Marshal of France
- Sovereign Prince of Henrichemont and Boisbelle
- Marquess of Rosny
- Marquess of Nogent-le-Béthune
- Count of Muret
- Count of Villebon
- Viscount of Meaux
- Viscount of Champrond
- Baron of Conti
- Baron of Caussade
- Baron of Montricoux
- Baron of Montigny
- Baron of Breteuil
- Baron of Francastel
- Lord of La Falaise
- Lord of Las
- Lord of Vitray
- Lord of Lalleubellouis
- Lord of various other places

== Works ==
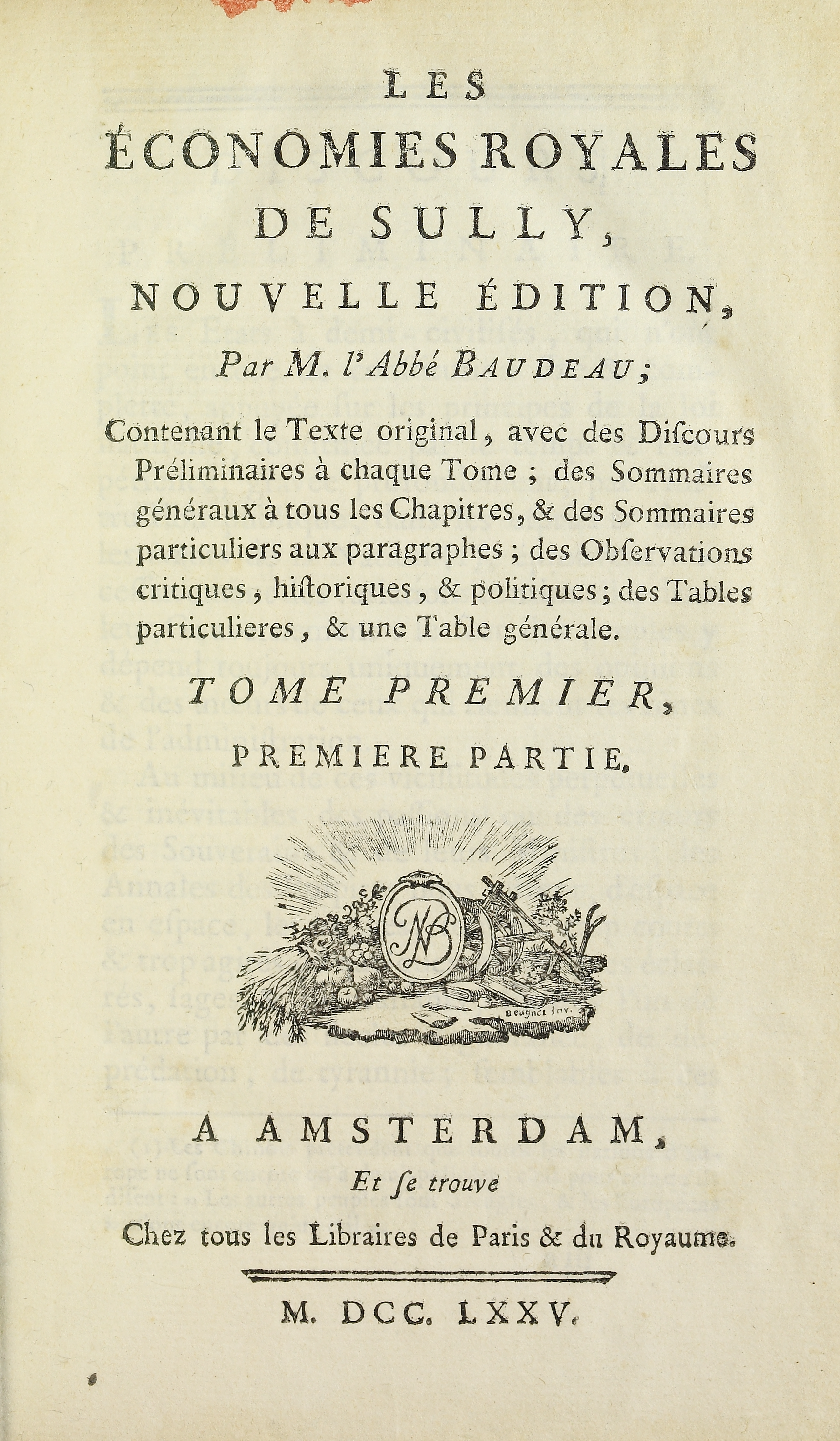
Les économies royales, 1775 edition

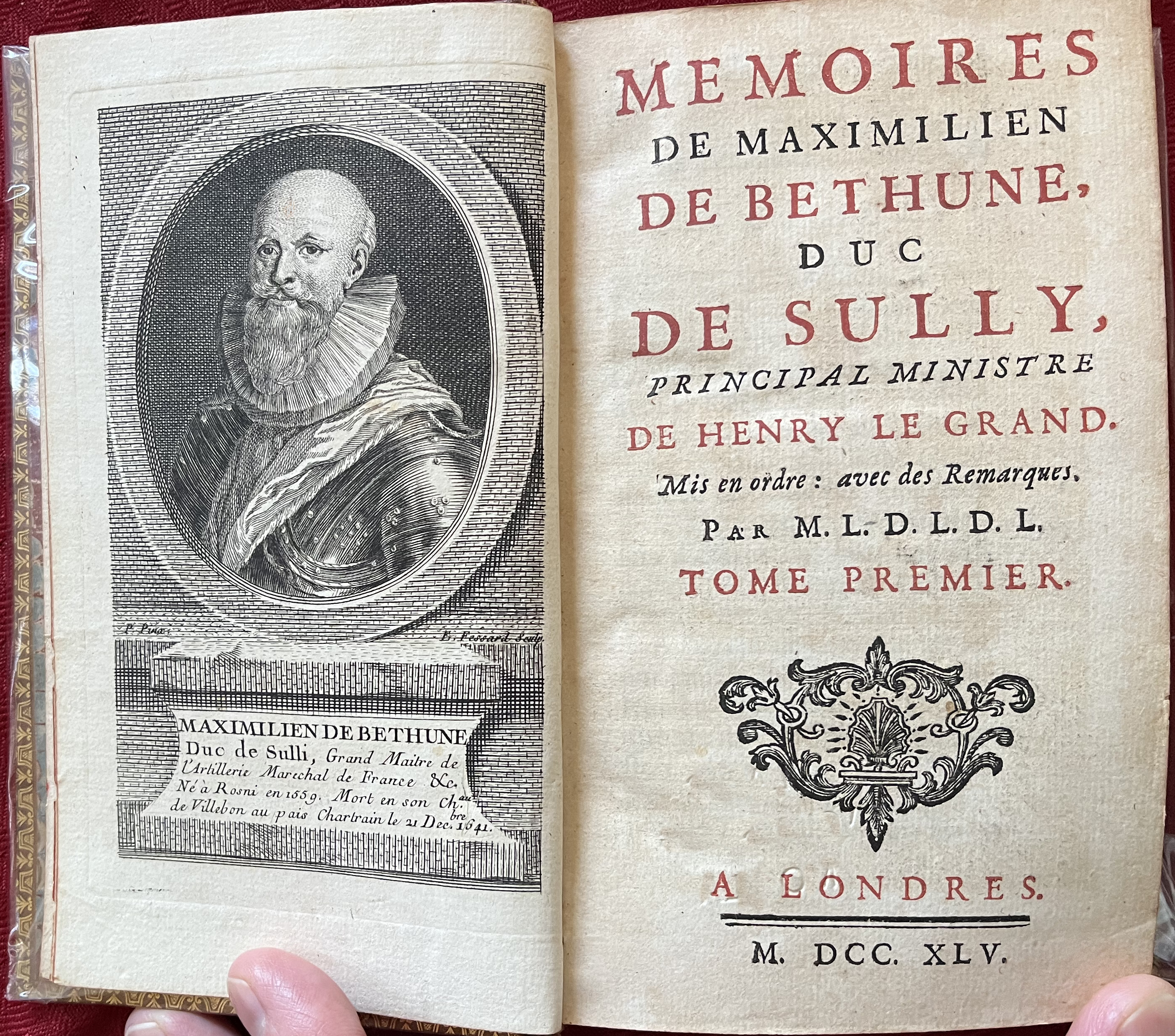
Memoires de Maximilien de Bethune, Duc de Sully

Sully left a collection of memoirs (Mémoires), otherwise known as the Économies royales, 1638 written in the second person. They are very valuable sources for the history of their time and as an autobiography, in spite of their containing many fictions, such as a mission undertaken by Sully to Queen Elizabeth I of England in 1601. One his most famous works was perhaps the idea of a Europe composed of 15 roughly equal states, under the direction of a "Very Christian Council of Europe", charged with resolving differences and disposing of a common army. This famous "Grand Design", a utopian plan for a Christian republic, is often cited as one of the first grand plans and ancestors for the European Union. Two folio volumes of the memoirs were splendidly printed, nominally at Amsterdam, but really under Sully's own eye, at his château of Sully in 1638; two other volumes appeared posthumously in Paris in 1662.

- Les économies royales. Amsterdam: sn. 1638.
  - Les économies royales. Vol. 1. Amsterdam: sn. 1775.
  - Les économies royales. Vol. 2. Amsterdam: sn. 1775.

For a partial modern edition, see David Buisseret and Bernard Barbiche, "Les Oeconomies royales de Sully," 4 vols., Paris 1970–2019

== Legacy ==
- The Pavillon Sully (Pavillon de l'Horloge) of the Palais du Louvre is named in honor of the Duc de Sully.
- The Ormeau Sully, an ancient field elm Ulmus minor, reputedly planted by Sully, survives (2016) in the village of Villesequelande near Carcassonne.
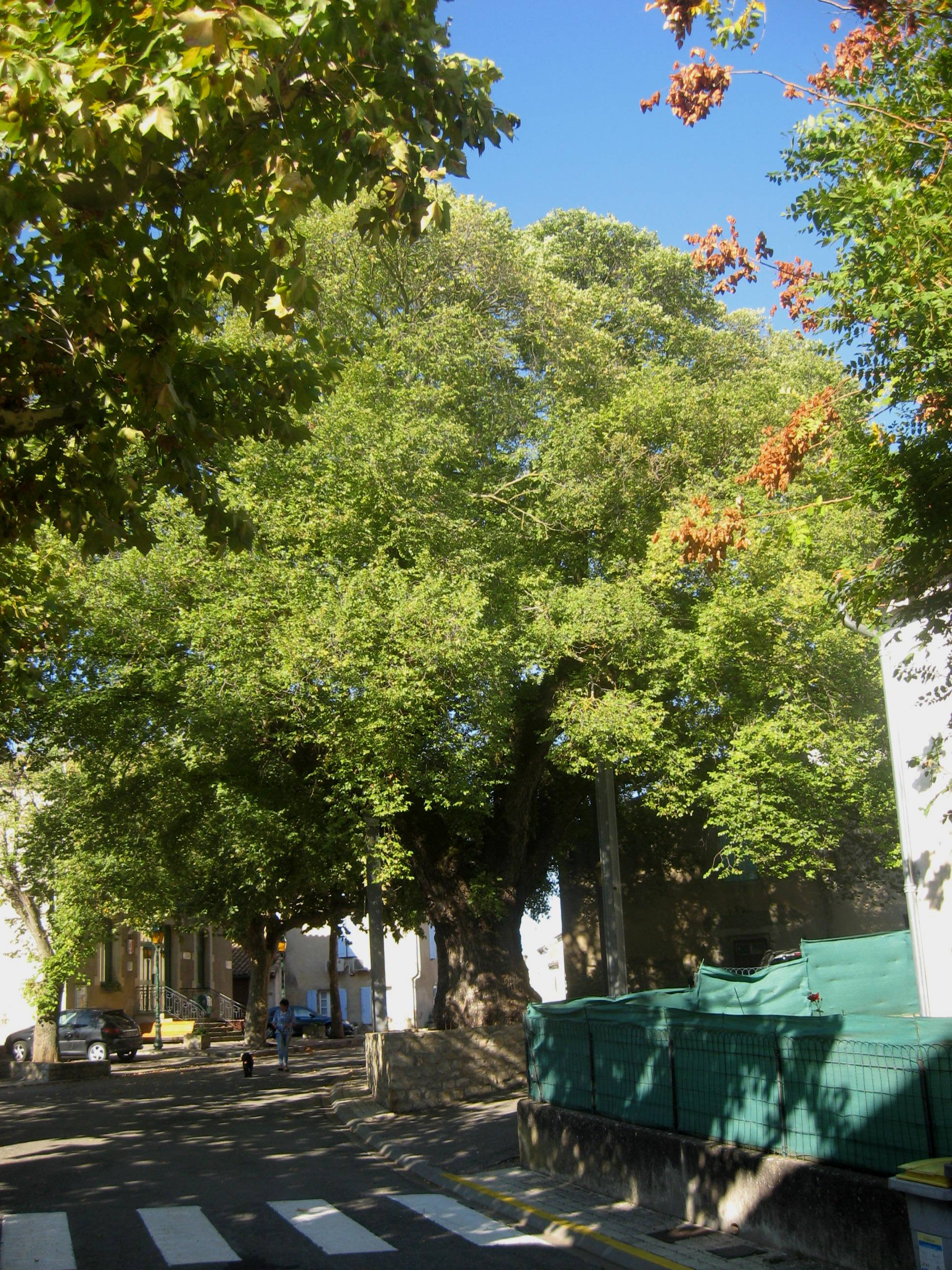
  Ormeau Sully, Villesequelande
- In the independent principality of Boisbelle, which he acquired in 1605, he started construction of a capital at Henrichemont.
- Many buildings at Paris, including the Place Royale, the Hopital Saint-Louis and the Arsenal

== Sources ==
His ancestry is traced at length and his career more briefly, reproducing original documents, in the monumental Histoire généalogique de la Maison de Béthune by the historian André Duchesne (Paris, 1639).

== Portraits in fiction ==
- In the 1938 Die Vollendung des Königs Henri Quatre book by Heinrich Mann
- Sully is the chief protagonist of the 1893 romance From the Memoirs of a Minister of France by Stanley Weyman.

Preceded by (none)	Informal Chief Minister to the French Monarch; 1596–1610	Succeeded by Concino Concini
