= Cervelle de canut =

French cheese spread

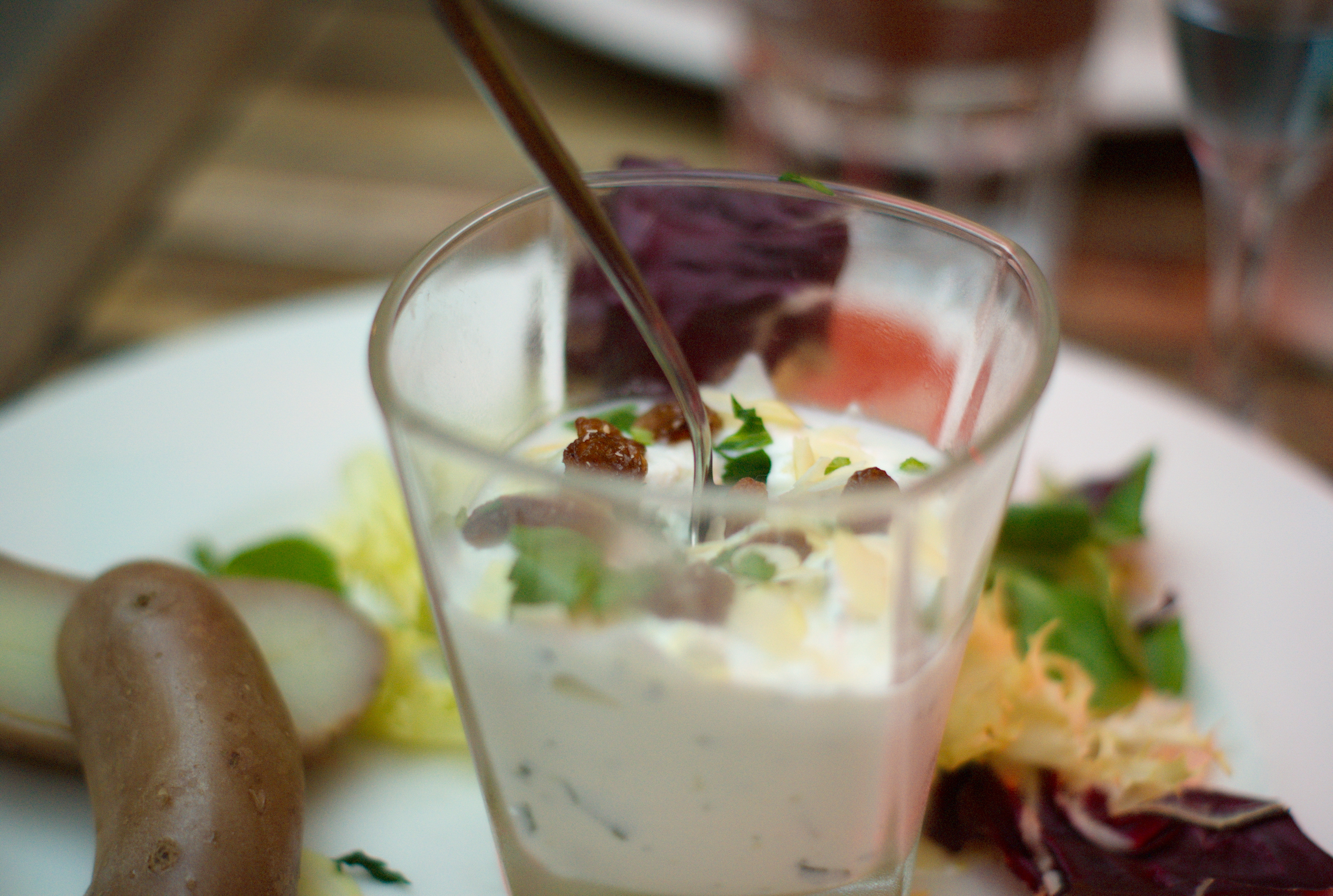
- Type: Spread
- Place of origin: France
- Region or state: Lyon
- Main ingredients: Fromage frais, herbs, shallots, salt, pepper, olive oil, vinegar

Cervelle de canut (French pronunciation: [sɛʁvɛl də kany]) is a cheese spread or dip that is a specialty of Lyon, France.

The dish is a base of fromage blanc, seasoned with chopped herbs, shallots, salt, pepper, olive oil and vinegar. Its name literally means "silk worker's brain", after the canuts, the silk workers of 19th-century Lyon. Its name is thought to reflect the low opinion Lyon's affluent had of the weavers.

== See also ==
- List of spreads
- Lyonnaise cuisine
