= Communauté de communes Terres du Haut Berry =

Federation of municipalities in France

Terres du Haut Berry
- Communauté de communes
- Interactive map of Terres du Haut Berry
- Coordinates: 47°12′N 02°34′E
- Country: France
- Region: Centre-Val de Loire
- Department: Cher
- No. of communes: {{{nbcomm}}}
- Established: 2017
- Area: 685.3 km^{2} (264.6 sq mi)
- Population (2018): 26,017
  - Density: 37.96/km^{2} (98.33/sq mi)
- Website: terresduhautberry.fr

The Communauté de communes Terres du Haut Berry is a communauté de communes, an intercommunal structure, in the Cher department, in the Centre-Val de Loire region, central France. It was created in January 2017 by the merger of the former communautés de communes Terres Vives, Hautes Terres en Haut Berry, and Terroirs d'Angillon. Its area is 685.3 km^{2}, and its population was 26,017 in 2018. Its seat is in Les Aix-d'Angillon.

== Communes ==
The communauté de communes consists of the following 30 communes:

1. Achères
2. Les Aix-d'Angillon
3. Allogny
4. Allouis
5. Aubinges
6. Azy
7. Brécy
8. La Chapelotte
9. Fussy
10. Henrichemont
11. Humbligny
12. Menetou-Salon
13. Montigny
14. Morogues
15. Moulins-sur-Yèvre
16. Neuilly-en-Sancerre
17. Neuvy-Deux-Clochers
18. Parassy
19. Pigny
20. Quantilly
21. Rians
22. Saint-Céols
23. Saint-Éloy-de-Gy
24. Sainte-Solange
25. Saint-Georges-sur-Moulon
26. Saint-Martin-d'Auxigny
27. Saint-Palais
28. Soulangis
29. Vasselay
30. Vignoux-sous-les-Aix
