= Henrichemont =

- Commune
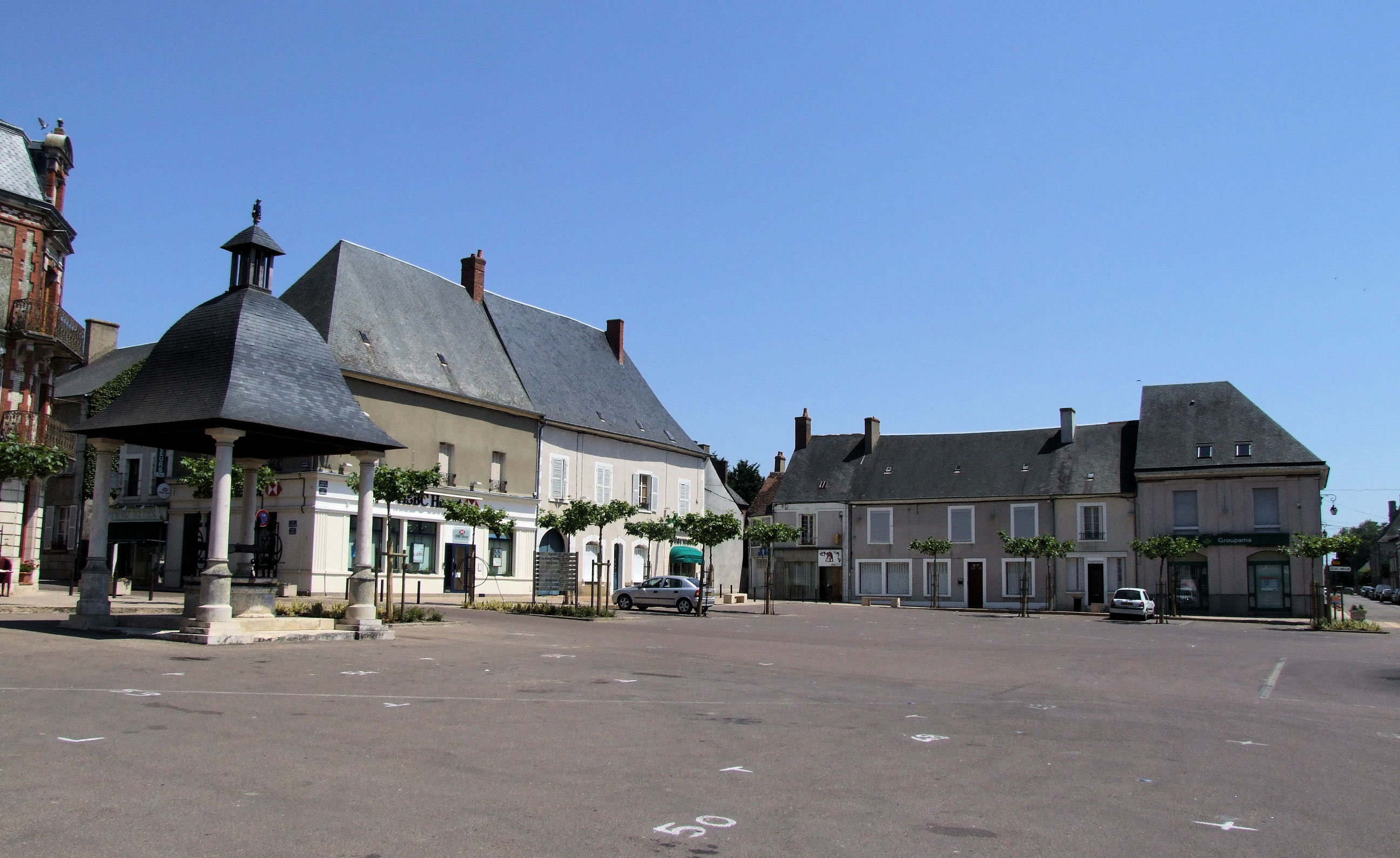
- The main square in Henrichemont

- Coat of arms
- Location of Henrichemont
- Location within France Location within Centre-Val de Loire
- Coordinates: 47°18′13″N 2°31′30″E
- Country: France
- Region: Centre-Val de Loire
- Department: Cher
- Arrondissement: Bourges
- Canton: Saint-Germain-du-Puy
- Intercommunality: CC Terres du Haut Berry

Government
  - Mayor (2020–2026): Gilles Bureau
- Area^{1}: 25.27 km^{2} (9.76 sq mi)
- Elevation: 285 m (935 ft)
- Highest elevation: 390 m (1,280 ft)
- Lowest elevation: 217 m (712 ft)
- Population (2023): 1,721
  - Density: 68.10/km^{2} (176.4/sq mi)
- Time zone: UTC+01:00 (CET)
  - Summer (DST): UTC+02:00 (CEST)
- INSEE/Postal code: 18109 /18250
- ^{1} French Land Register data, which excludes lakes, ponds, glaciers > 1 km^{2} (0.386 sq mi or 247 acres) and river estuaries.

Henrichemont (French pronunciation: [ɑ̃ʁiʃmɔ̃]), formerly known as Boisbelle, is a commune in the Cher department in the Centre-Val de Loire region of France. The village was created and named in honour of Henri IV in 1609 by Maximilien de Béthune, Duke of Sully to be the capital of the principality of Boisbelle and possibly a refuge for the protestants of the region. The principality approximated to the territories of the former canton of Henrichemont. The hamlet of La Borne is home to a restored tradition of stoneware pottery, attracting world-renowned artists and writers to stay there. The village is one of the most popular small tourist attractions in France.

It is on the banks of the river Vernon, some 16 miles (26 km) northeast of Bourges.

== Population ==
Historical population
Year	Pop.	±% p.a.
1968	1,973	—
1975	1,894	−0.58%
1982	1,826	−0.52%
1990	1,845	+0.13%
1999	1,829	−0.10%
2007	1,806	−0.16%
2012	1,797	−0.10%
2017	1,760	−0.42%
2023	1,721	−0.37%
Source: INSEE

== See also ==
- Communes of the Cher department
