= Saint-Michel-de-Volangis =

- Commune
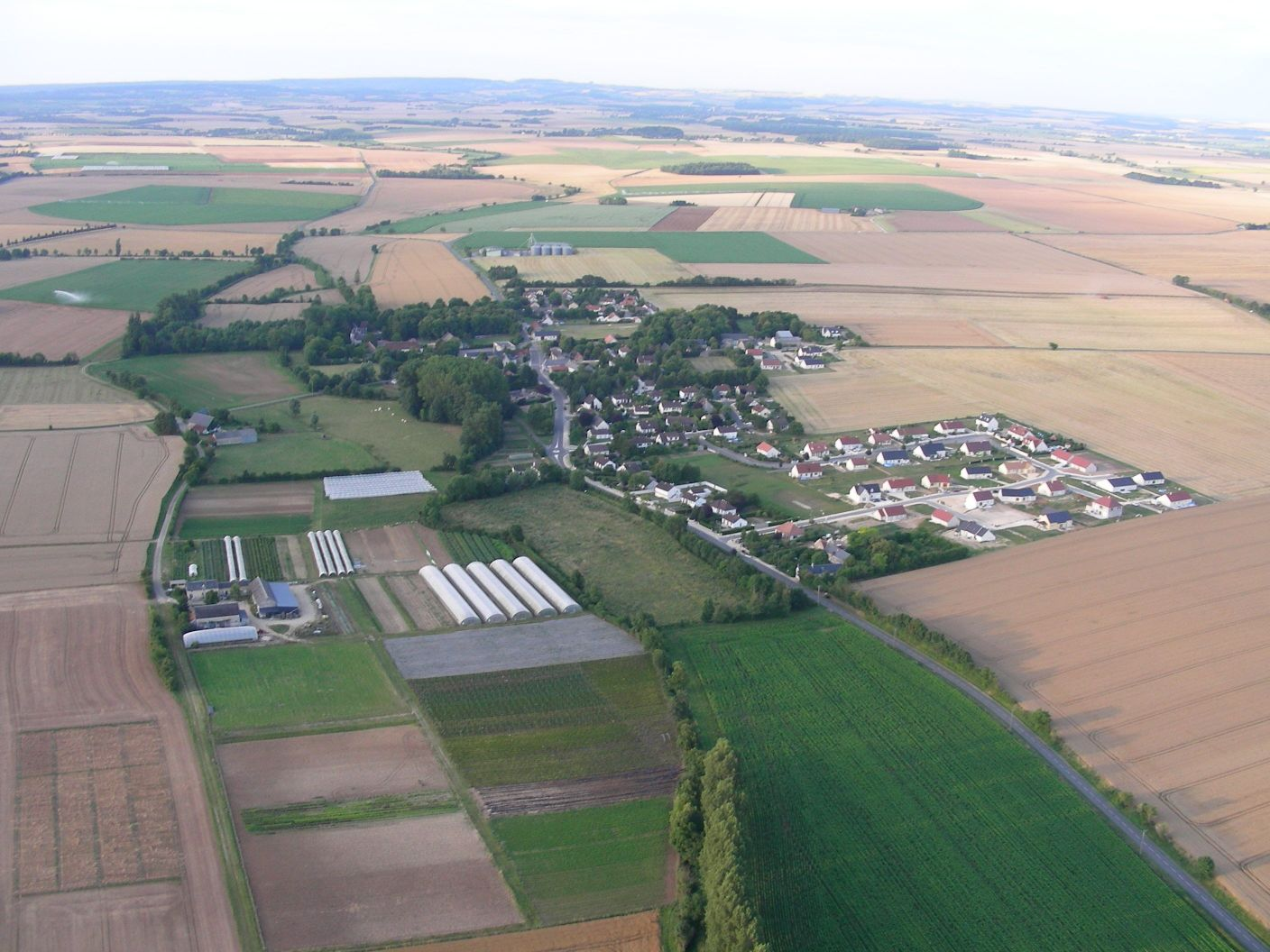
- A general view of Saint-Michel-de-Volangis
- Location of Saint-Michel-de-Volangis
- Location within France Location within Centre-Val de Loire
- Coordinates: 47°08′55″N 2°29′21″E
- Country: France
- Region: Centre-Val de Loire
- Department: Cher
- Arrondissement: Bourges
- Canton: Saint-Germain-du-Puy
- Intercommunality: CA Bourges Plus

Government
  - Mayor (2020–2026): Denis Poyet
- Area^{1}: 17.42 km^{2} (6.73 sq mi)
- Highest elevation: 172 m (564 ft)
- Lowest elevation: 137 m (449 ft)
- Population (2023): 474
  - Density: 27.2/km^{2} (70.5/sq mi)
- Time zone: UTC+01:00 (CET)
  - Summer (DST): UTC+02:00 (CEST)
- INSEE/Postal code: 18226 /18390
- ^{1} French Land Register data, which excludes lakes, ponds, glaciers > 1 km^{2} (0.386 sq mi or 247 acres) and river estuaries.

Saint-Michel-de-Volangis (French pronunciation: [sɛ̃ miʃɛl də vɔlɑ̃ʒi]) is a commune in the Cher department in the Centre-Val de Loire region of France.

== Geography ==
A farming area comprising the village and a couple of hamlets situated by the banks of the Langis river, some 6 miles (9.7 km) northeast of Bourges at the junction of the D955 with the D33 and the D186 roads.

== Population ==
Historical population
Year	Pop.	±% p.a.
1968	176	—
1975	169	−0.58%
1982	261	+6.41%
1990	334	+3.13%
1999	331	−0.10%
2007	439	+3.59%
2012	473	+1.50%
2017	468	−0.21%
2023	474	+0.21%
Source: INSEE

== Sights ==
- The church of St. Michel, dating from the twelfth century.
- The chateau of Turly, built in the fifteenth century.

== See also ==
- Communes of the Cher department
