= Canton of Saint-Germain-du-Puy =

Coordinates: 47.10°N 2.48°E

The canton of Saint-Germain-du-Puy is an administrative division of the Cher department, in central France. It was created at the French canton reorganisation which came into effect in March 2015. Its seat is in Saint-Germain-du-Puy.

It consists of the following communes:

1. Les Aix-d'Angillon
2. Aubinges
3. Azy
4. Brécy
5. La Chapelotte
6. Henrichemont
7. Humbligny
8. Montigny
9. Morogues
10. Neuilly-en-Sancerre
11. Neuvy-Deux-Clochers
12. Parassy
13. Rians
14. Saint-Céols
15. Saint-Germain-du-Puy
16. Saint-Michel-de-Volangis
17. Sainte-Solange
18. Soulangis
