= Fromage blanc =

Type of creamy soft fresh cheese

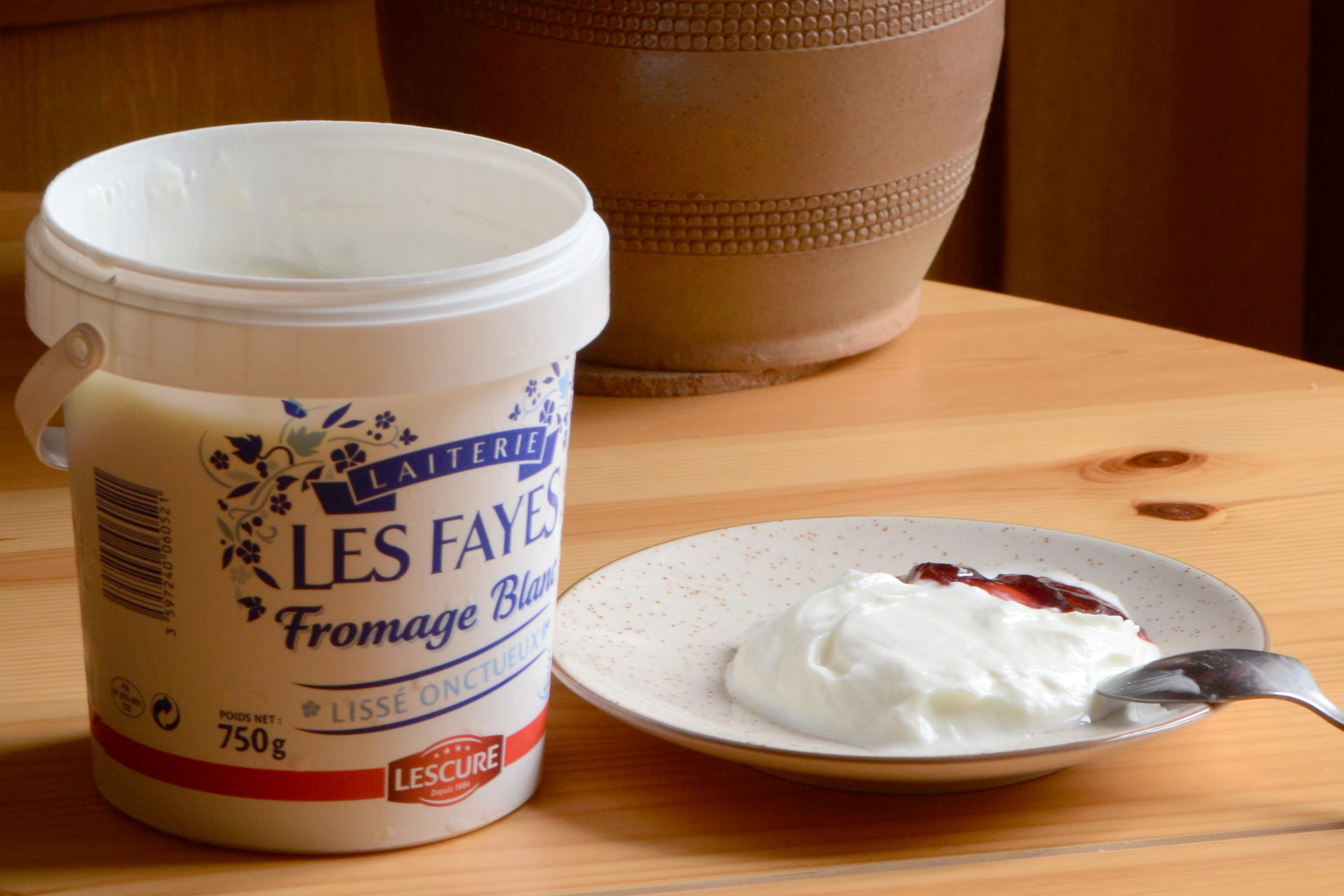
- Fromage blanc served on a plate with jam, with its container
- Alternative names: maquée, fromage frais
- Place of origin: France; Belgium
- Main ingredients: whole or skimmed milk, cream

Fromage blanc (UK: /ˌfrɒmɑːʒ ˈblɒ̃/; French pronunciation: [fʁɔmaʒ blɑ̃]; also known as maquée) and fromage frais are acid-coagulated fresh cheeses originating from the north of France and southern Belgium. The name "fromage blanc" means "white cheese" in French. Fromage blanc is closely related to fromage frais ("fresh cheese") with the only difference being that, according to French legislation, fromage frais must contain live cultures when sold, whereas with fromage blanc, fermentation has been halted.

Fromage blanc and fromage frais are similar in appearance to yogurt, with a mild taste and a smooth, homogenous mouthfeel similar to that of other fresh cheeses such as quark and cottage cheese. It can be served either as a dessert, spread on bread, usually over or under jam, or used in savoury dishes. In many Western countries, fromage blanc and/or fromage frais are frequently sold in supermarkets alongside yogurts. In countries such as the United Kingdom, fromage frais in particular (which was introduced to the UK market during the 1980s) is often sold sweetened with sugar and mixed with a fruit flavouring, being frequently marketed as a dessert for children.

== See also ==
- List of French cheeses
- Faisselle
