= La Chapelotte =

- Commune
- Location of La Chapelotte
- Location within France Location within Centre-Val de Loire
- Coordinates: 47°21′11″N 2°35′29″E
- Country: France
- Region: Centre-Val de Loire
- Department: Cher
- Arrondissement: Bourges
- Canton: Saint-Germain-du-Puy
- Intercommunality: CC Terres du Haut Berry

Government
  - Mayor (2020–2026): Thierry Doucet
- Area^{1}: 28.5 km^{2} (11.0 sq mi)
- Elevation: 315 m (1,033 ft)
- Highest elevation: 383 m (1,257 ft)
- Lowest elevation: 258 m (846 ft)
- Population (2023): 132
  - Density: 4.63/km^{2} (12.0/sq mi)
- Time zone: UTC+01:00 (CET)
  - Summer (DST): UTC+02:00 (CEST)
- INSEE/Postal code: 18051 /18250
- ^{1} French Land Register data, which excludes lakes, ponds, glaciers > 1 km^{2} (0.386 sq mi or 247 acres) and river estuaries.

La Chapelotte (French pronunciation: [la ʃaplɔt]) is a commune in the Cher department in the Centre-Val de Loire region of France.

== Geography ==
A forestry and farming village situated by the banks of the river Vernon, some 22 miles (35 km) northeast of Bourges, at the junction of the D7, D11 and the D231 roads.

== Population ==
Historical population
Year	Pop.	±% p.a.
1968	240	—
1975	204	−2.29%
1982	180	−1.77%
1990	167	−0.93%
1999	181	+0.90%
2007	181	+0.00%
2012	177	−0.45%
2017	151	−3.13%
2023	132	−2.22%
Source: INSEE

== Sights ==
- The church of Notre-Dame, dating from the twentieth century.
- Two watermills.

== See also ==
- Communes of the Cher department
