= Montigny, Cher =

Montigny
- Commune
- Location of Montigny
- Location within France Location within Centre-Val de Loire
- Coordinates: 47°15′05″N 2°40′52″E
- Country: France
- Region: Centre-Val de Loire
- Department: Cher
- Arrondissement: Bourges
- Canton: Saint-Germain-du-Puy
- Intercommunality: CC Terres du Haut Berry

Government
  - Mayor (2022–2026): Jean-Loup Van der Beken
- Area^{1}: 28.65 km^{2} (11.06 sq mi)
- Elevation: 222 m (728 ft)
- Highest elevation: 353 m (1,158 ft)
- Lowest elevation: 191 m (627 ft)
- Population (2023): 316
  - Density: 11.0/km^{2} (28.6/sq mi)
- Time zone: UTC+01:00 (CET)
  - Summer (DST): UTC+02:00 (CEST)
- INSEE/Postal code: 18151 /18250
- ^{1} French Land Register data, which excludes lakes, ponds, glaciers > 1 km^{2} (0.386 sq mi or 247 acres) and river estuaries.

Montigny (French pronunciation: [mɔ̃tiɲi]) is a commune in the Cher department in the Centre-Val de Loire region of France about 15 miles (24 km) northeast of Bourges.

== Population ==
Historical population
Year	Pop.	±% p.a.
1968	489	—
1975	432	−1.75%
1982	422	−0.33%
1990	375	−1.47%
1999	373	−0.06%
2007	342	−1.08%
2012	387	+2.50%
2017	387	+0.00%
2023	316	−3.32%
Source: INSEE

== See also ==
- Communes of the Cher department
