= Soulangis =

- Commune
- Location of Soulangis
- Location within France Location within Centre-Val de Loire
- Coordinates: 47°11′15″N 2°31′06″E
- Country: France
- Region: Centre-Val de Loire
- Department: Cher
- Arrondissement: Bourges
- Canton: Saint-Germain-du-Puy
- Intercommunality: CC Terres du Haut Berry

Government
  - Mayor (2020–2026): Camille De Paul
- Area^{1}: 13.76 km^{2} (5.31 sq mi)
- Elevation: 185 m (607 ft)
- Highest elevation: 198 m (650 ft)
- Lowest elevation: 151 m (495 ft)
- Population (2023): 454
  - Density: 33.0/km^{2} (85.5/sq mi)
- Time zone: UTC+01:00 (CET)
  - Summer (DST): UTC+02:00 (CEST)
- INSEE/Postal code: 18253 /18220
- ^{1} French Land Register data, which excludes lakes, ponds, glaciers > 1 km^{2} (0.386 sq mi or 247 acres) and river estuaries.

Soulangis (French pronunciation: [sulɑ̃ʒi]) is a commune in the Cher department in the Centre-Val de Loire region of France.

== Information ==
=== Geography ===
A farming area comprising the village and a couple of hamlets situated by the banks of the river Langis, about 9 miles (14 km) northeast of Bourges, at the junction of the D33 with the D56 road.

=== Population ===
Historical population
Year	Pop.	±% p.a.
1968	296	—
1975	298	+0.10%
1982	391	+3.96%
1990	422	+0.96%
1999	444	+0.57%
2007	423	−0.60%
2012	466	+1.96%
2017	497	+1.30%
2023	454	−1.50%
Source: INSEE

=== Sights ===
- The church of St. Martin, dating from the twelfth century.
- A feudal motte.
- The sixteenth-century chateau.

== See also ==
- Communes of the Cher department
