= Saint-Céols =

- Commune
- Location of Saint-Céols
- Location within France Location within Centre-Val de Loire
- Coordinates: 47°13′22″N 2°37′50″E
- Country: France
- Region: Centre-Val de Loire
- Department: Cher
- Arrondissement: Bourges
- Canton: Saint-Germain-du-Puy
- Intercommunality: CC Terres du Haut Berry

Government
  - Mayor (2020–2026): Cédric Fischer
- Area^{1}: 3.34 km^{2} (1.29 sq mi)
- Elevation: 208 m (682 ft)
- Highest elevation: 278 m (912 ft)
- Lowest elevation: 194 m (636 ft)
- Population (2023): 16
  - Density: 4.8/km^{2} (12/sq mi)
- Time zone: UTC+01:00 (CET)
  - Summer (DST): UTC+02:00 (CEST)
- INSEE/Postal code: 18202 /18220
- ^{1} French Land Register data, which excludes lakes, ponds, glaciers > 1 km^{2} (0.386 sq mi or 247 acres) and river estuaries.

Saint-Céols is a commune in the Cher department in the Centre-Val de Loire region of France.

== Geography ==
A tiny farming village situated some 14 miles (23 km) northeast of Bourges, near the junction of the D955 with the D154 and D59 roads.

== Population ==
Historical population
| Year | Pop. | ±% p.a. |
|---|---|---|
| 1968 | 42 | — |
| 1975 | 27 | −6.12% |
| 1982 | 22 | −2.88% |
| 1990 | 25 | +1.61% |
| 1999 | 32 | +2.78% |
| 2007 | 17 | −7.60% |
| 2012 | 18 | +1.15% |
| 2017 | 14 | −4.90% |
| 2023 | 16 | +2.25% |
Source: INSEE

== Sights ==
- The church of St. Céols, dating from the thirteenth century.
- The sixteenth-century chateau, with two dovecotes.

== See also ==
- Communes of the Cher department
