= Rians, Cher =

Rians
- Commune
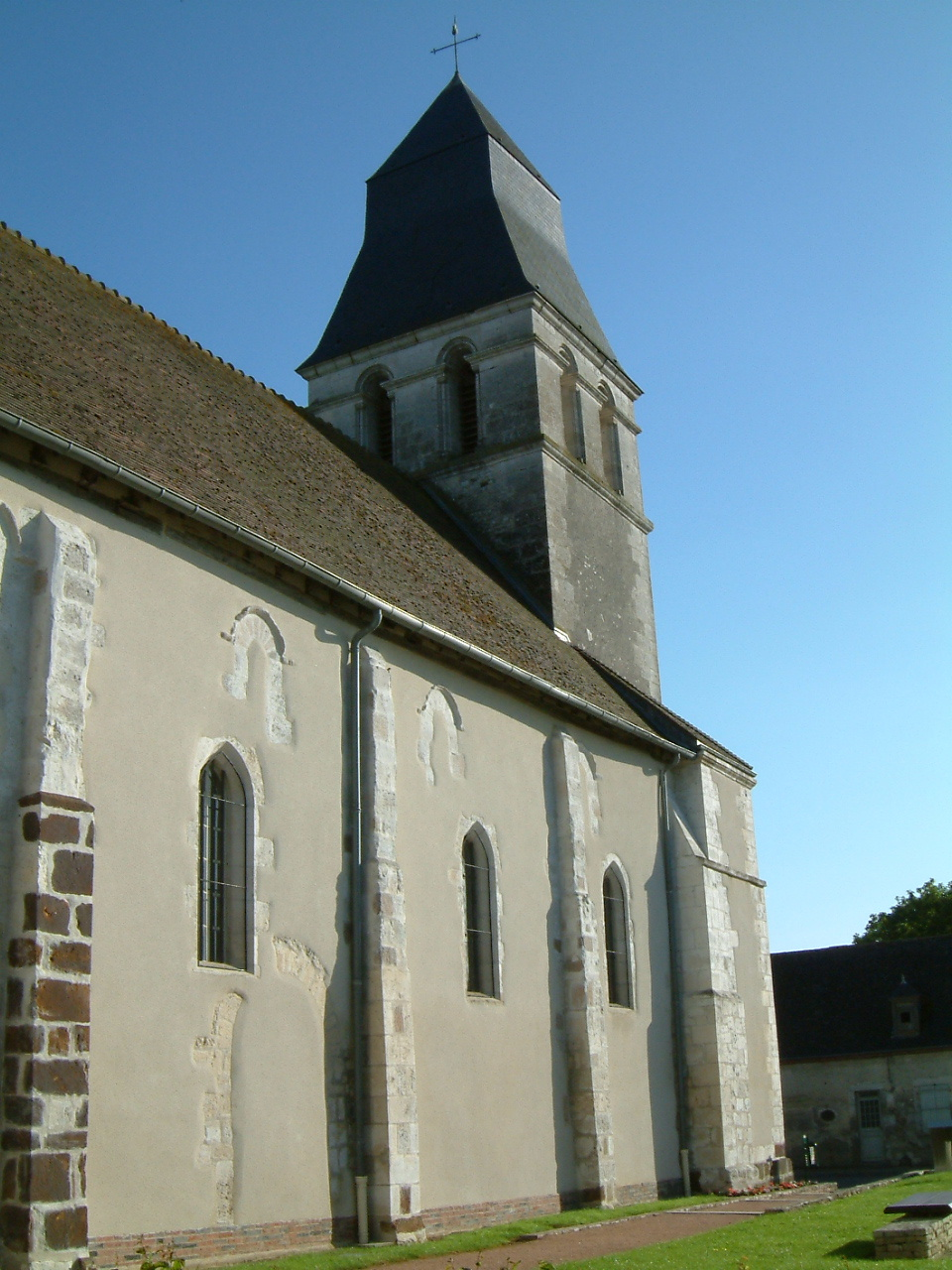
- The church of Saint-Christophe, in Rians
- Location of Rians
- Location within France Location within Centre-Val de Loire
- Coordinates: 47°11′10″N 2°36′54″E
- Country: France
- Region: Centre-Val de Loire
- Department: Cher
- Arrondissement: Bourges
- Canton: Saint-Germain-du-Puy
- Intercommunality: CC Terres du Haut Berry

Government
  - Mayor (2020–2026): Christophe Drunat
- Area^{1}: 32.41 km^{2} (12.51 sq mi)
- Elevation: 180 m (590 ft)
- Highest elevation: 256 m (840 ft)
- Lowest elevation: 155 m (509 ft)
- Population (2023): 950
  - Density: 29/km^{2} (76/sq mi)
- Time zone: UTC+01:00 (CET)
  - Summer (DST): UTC+02:00 (CEST)
- INSEE/Postal code: 18194 /18220
- ^{1} French Land Register data, which excludes lakes, ponds, glaciers > 1 km^{2} (0.386 sq mi or 247 acres) and river estuaries.

Rians (French pronunciation: [ʁjɑ̃]) is a commune in the Cher department in the Centre-Val de Loire region of France.

== Geography ==
An area of farming and some associated light industry comprising the village and two hamlets situated on the banks of the small river Quatier, about 12 miles (19 km) northeast of Bourges, at the junction of the D12, D24 and the D154 roads. An unusual kind of fresh (unpasteurised) cheese, Faisselle Rians, is produced here.

== Population ==
Historical population
Year	Pop.	±% p.a.
1968	667	—
1975	731	+1.32%
1982	836	+1.94%
1990	984	+2.06%
1999	1,017	+0.37%
2007	1,047	+0.36%
2012	1,019	−0.54%
2017	973	−0.92%
2023	950	−0.40%
Source: INSEE

== Sights ==
- The church of St. Christophe, dating from the twelfth century.
- The fifteenth-century chateau of Sery.
- The two watermills of Malvette and Ecorce.

== See also ==
- Communes of the Cher department
