= Humbligny =

- Commune
- Location of Humbligny
- Location within France Location within Centre-Val de Loire
- Coordinates: 47°15′17″N 2°39′45″E
- Country: France
- Region: Centre-Val de Loire
- Department: Cher
- Arrondissement: Bourges
- Canton: Saint-Germain-du-Puy
- Intercommunality: CC Terres du Haut Berry

Government
  - Mayor (2020–2026): Cécile Bory
- Area^{1}: 20.86 km^{2} (8.05 sq mi)
- Elevation: 434 m (1,424 ft)
- Highest elevation: 428 m (1,404 ft)
- Lowest elevation: 227 m (745 ft)
- Population (2023): 175
  - Density: 8.39/km^{2} (21.7/sq mi)
- Time zone: UTC+01:00 (CET)
  - Summer (DST): UTC+02:00 (CEST)
- INSEE/Postal code: 18111 /18250
- ^{1} French Land Register data, which excludes lakes, ponds, glaciers > 1 km^{2} (0.386 sq mi or 247 acres) and river estuaries.

Humbligny (French pronunciation: [œ̃bliɲi]) is a commune in the Cher department in the Centre-Val de Loire region of France.

== Geography ==
A forestry and farming village situated some 15 miles (24 km) northeast of Bourges, at the junction of the D955 and the D44 roads. The village is the highest point in the northern part of the department and the source of two rivers, the Sauldre and Colin.

== Population ==
Historical population
Year	Pop.	±% p.a.
1968	268	—
1975	239	−1.62%
1982	221	−1.11%
1990	189	−1.94%
1999	180	−0.54%
2007	187	+0.48%
2012	180	−0.76%
2017	190	+1.09%
2023	175	−1.36%
Source: INSEE

== Sights ==
- The church of St. Martin, dating from the thirteenth century.
- Houses dating from the 15th and 16th centuries.
- A feudal motte.

== See also ==
- Communes of the Cher department
