= Achères, Cher =

Achères
- Commune
- Coat of arms
- Location of Achères
- Location within France Location within Centre-Val de Loire
- Coordinates: 47°16′44″N 2°26′58″E
- Country: France
- Region: Centre-Val de Loire
- Department: Cher
- Arrondissement: Bourges
- Canton: Saint-Martin-d'Auxigny
- Intercommunality: Terres du Haut Berry

Government
  - Mayor (2020–2026): André Jouanin
- Area^{1}: 12.75 km^{2} (4.92 sq mi)
- Elevation: 231 m (758 ft)
- Highest elevation: 317 m (1,040 ft)
- Lowest elevation: 211 m (692 ft)
- Population (2023): 326
  - Density: 25.6/km^{2} (66.2/sq mi)
- Time zone: UTC+01:00 (CET)
  - Summer (DST): UTC+02:00 (CEST)
- INSEE/Postal code: 18001 /18250
- ^{1} French Land Register data, which excludes lakes, ponds, glaciers > 1 km^{2} (0.386 sq mi or 247 acres) and river estuaries.

Achères (French pronunciation: [aʃɛʁ]) is a commune in the Cher department in the Centre-Val de Loire region of France about 14 miles (23 km) north of Bourges.

== Population ==
Historical population
Year	Pop.	±% p.a.
1968	265	—
1975	227	−2.19%
1982	273	+2.67%
1990	335	+2.59%
1999	354	+0.61%
2007	352	−0.07%
2012	378	+1.44%
2017	380	+0.11%
2023	326	−2.52%
Source: INSEE

== See also ==
- Communes of the Cher department
