= Azy, Cher =

Azy
- Commune
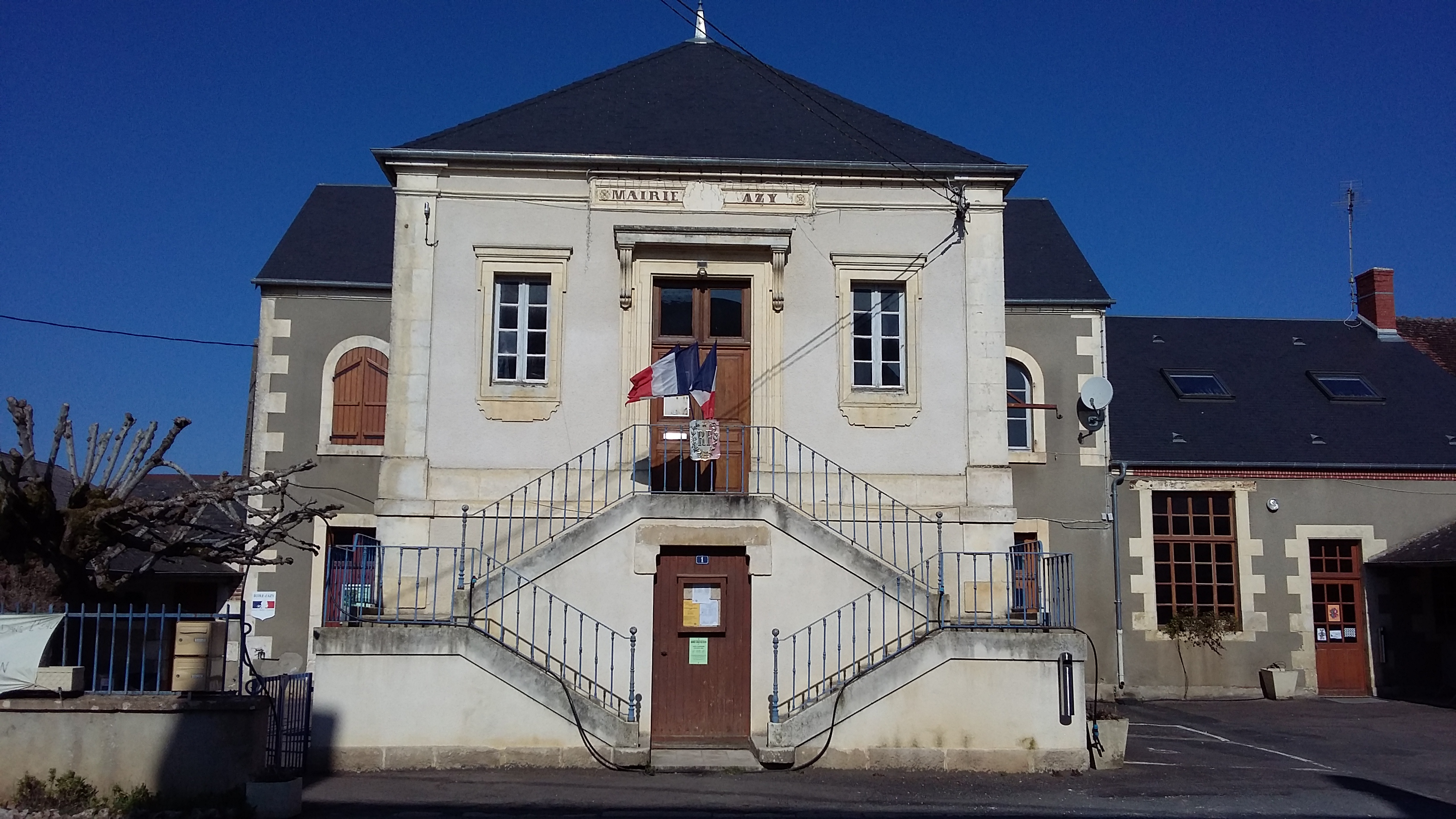
- Town hall

- Coat of arms
- Location of Azy
- Location within France Location within Centre-Val de Loire
- Coordinates: 47°11′02″N 2°42′30″E
- Country: France
- Region: Centre-Val de Loire
- Department: Cher
- Arrondissement: Bourges
- Canton: Saint-Germain-du-Puy
- Intercommunality: Terres du Haut Berry

Government
  - Mayor (2020–2026): Jean-Noël Guillaumin
- Area^{1}: 27.62 km^{2} (10.66 sq mi)
- Elevation: 205 m (673 ft)
- Highest elevation: 241 m (791 ft)
- Lowest elevation: 179 m (587 ft)
- Population (2023): 450
  - Density: 16/km^{2} (42/sq mi)
- Time zone: UTC+01:00 (CET)
  - Summer (DST): UTC+02:00 (CEST)
- INSEE/Postal code: 18019 /18220
- ^{1} French Land Register data, which excludes lakes, ponds, glaciers > 1 km^{2} (0.386 sq mi or 247 acres) and river estuaries.

Azy (French pronunciation: [azi]) is a commune in the Cher department in the Centre-Val de Loire region of France, by the banks of the river Fromion, about 13 miles (21 km) northeast of Bourges.

== Population ==
Historical population
Year	Pop.	±% p.a.
1968	587	—
1975	532	−1.40%
1982	479	−1.49%
1990	413	−1.84%
1999	439	+0.68%
2007	474	+0.96%
2012	489	+0.63%
2017	445	−1.87%
2023	450	+0.19%
Source: INSEE

== See also ==
- Communes of the Cher department
