= Parassy =

- Commune
- Coat of arms
- Location of Parassy
- Location within France Location within Centre-Val de Loire
- Coordinates: 47°14′02″N 2°32′54″E
- Country: France
- Region: Centre-Val de Loire
- Department: Cher
- Arrondissement: Bourges
- Canton: Saint-Germain-du-Puy
- Intercommunality: CC Terres du Haut Berry

Government
  - Mayor (2020–2026): Nicole Pinson
- Area^{1}: 26.02 km^{2} (10.05 sq mi)
- Elevation: 263 m (863 ft)
- Highest elevation: 348 m (1,142 ft)
- Lowest elevation: 173 m (568 ft)
- Population (2023): 415
  - Density: 15.9/km^{2} (41.3/sq mi)
- Time zone: UTC+01:00 (CET)
  - Summer (DST): UTC+02:00 (CEST)
- INSEE/Postal code: 18176 /18220
- ^{1} French Land Register data, which excludes lakes, ponds, glaciers > 1 km^{2} (0.386 sq mi or 247 acres) and river estuaries.

Parassy (French pronunciation: [paʁasi]) is a commune in the Cher department in the Centre-Val de Loire region of France.

== Geography ==
A winegrowing, farming and forestry area comprising a small village and a few hamlets situated some 13 miles (21 km) northeast of Bourges, at the junction of the D12 with the D33 and the D25 roads. The grapes grown here are used for Ménétou-Salon AOC wine.

== Population ==
Historical population
Year	Pop.	±% p.a.
1968	346	—
1975	293	−2.35%
1982	346	+2.40%
1990	458	+3.57%
1999	423	−0.88%
2007	407	−0.48%
2012	417	+0.49%
2017	414	−0.14%
2023	415	+0.04%
Source: INSEE

== Sights ==
- A nineteenth-century chateau.
- Holy Trinity church, dating from the twelfth century.

== See also ==
- Communes of the Cher department
