= Neuvy-Deux-Clochers =

- Commune
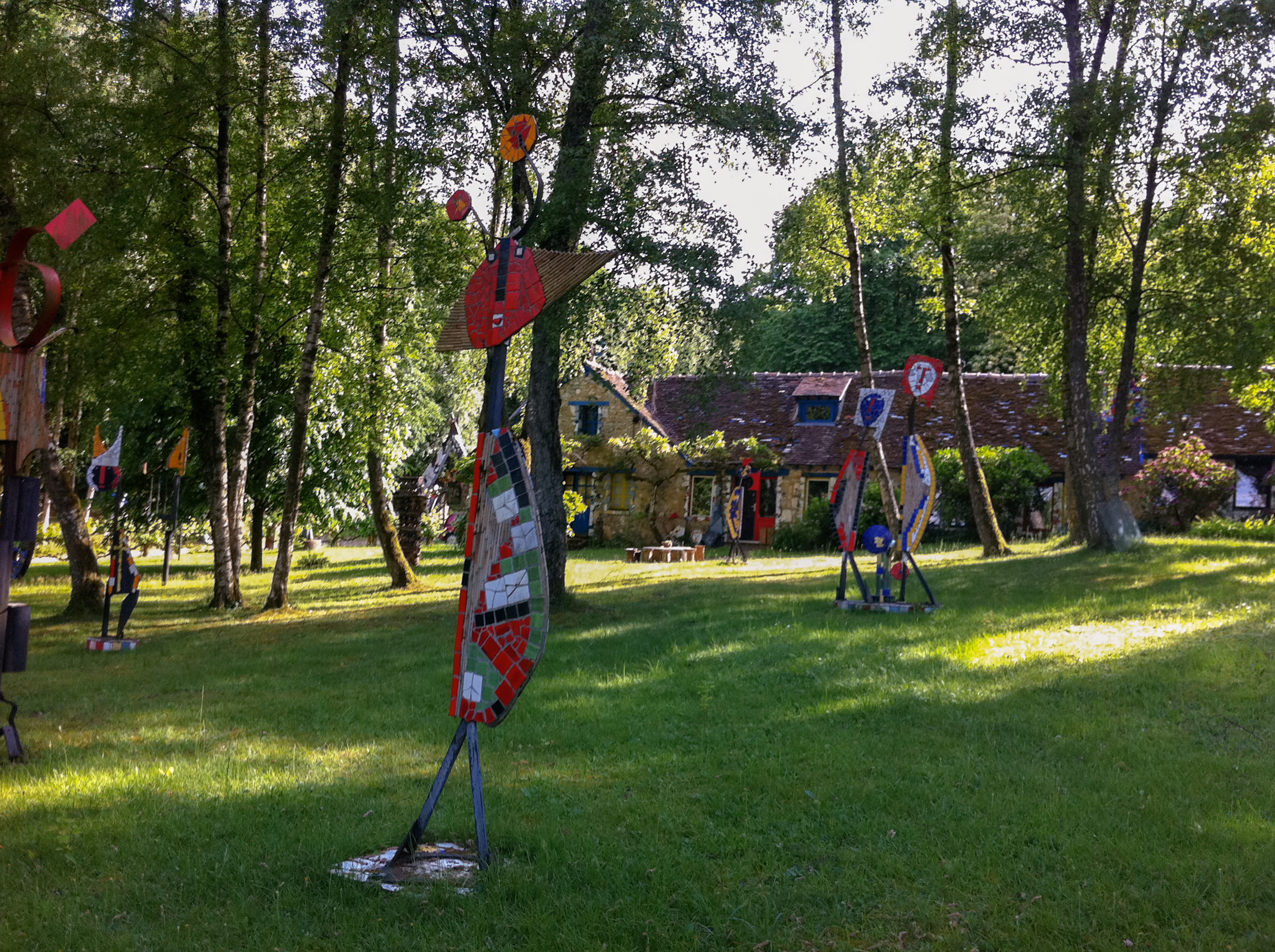
- The house of Jean Linard

- Coat of arms
- Location of Neuvy-Deux-Clochers
- Location within France Location within Centre-Val de Loire
- Coordinates: 47°16′44″N 2°42′00″E
- Country: France
- Region: Centre-Val de Loire
- Department: Cher
- Arrondissement: Bourges
- Canton: Saint-Germain-du-Puy
- Intercommunality: CC Terres du Haut Berry

Government
  - Mayor (2020–2026): Isabelle Legeret
- Area^{1}: 16.5 km^{2} (6.4 sq mi)
- Elevation: 260 m (850 ft)
- Highest elevation: 414 m (1,358 ft)
- Lowest elevation: 242 m (794 ft)
- Population (2023): 247
  - Density: 15.0/km^{2} (38.8/sq mi)
- Time zone: UTC+01:00 (CET)
  - Summer (DST): UTC+02:00 (CEST)
- INSEE/Postal code: 18163 /18250
- ^{1} French Land Register data, which excludes lakes, ponds, glaciers > 1 km^{2} (0.386 sq mi or 247 acres) and river estuaries.

Neuvy-Deux-Clochers (French pronunciation: [nøvi dø klɔʃe]) is a commune in the Cher department in the Centre-Val de Loire region of France.

== Geography ==
A farming area comprising the village and a couple of hamlets, situated some 20 miles (32 km) northeast of Bourges, at the junction of the D49 with the D74 and D196 roads.

== Population ==
Historical population
Year	Pop.	±% p.a.
1968	422	—
1975	384	−1.34%
1982	345	−1.52%
1990	305	−1.53%
1999	282	−0.87%
2007	303	+0.90%
2012	305	+0.13%
2017	280	−1.70%
2023	247	−2.07%
Source: INSEE

== Sights ==
- The church of St. Jean-Baptiste, dating from the twelfth century.
- The tower of the 12th-century Vèvre castle at the hamlet of La Tour.

== See also ==
- Communes of the Cher department
