= Neuilly-en-Sancerre =

- Commune
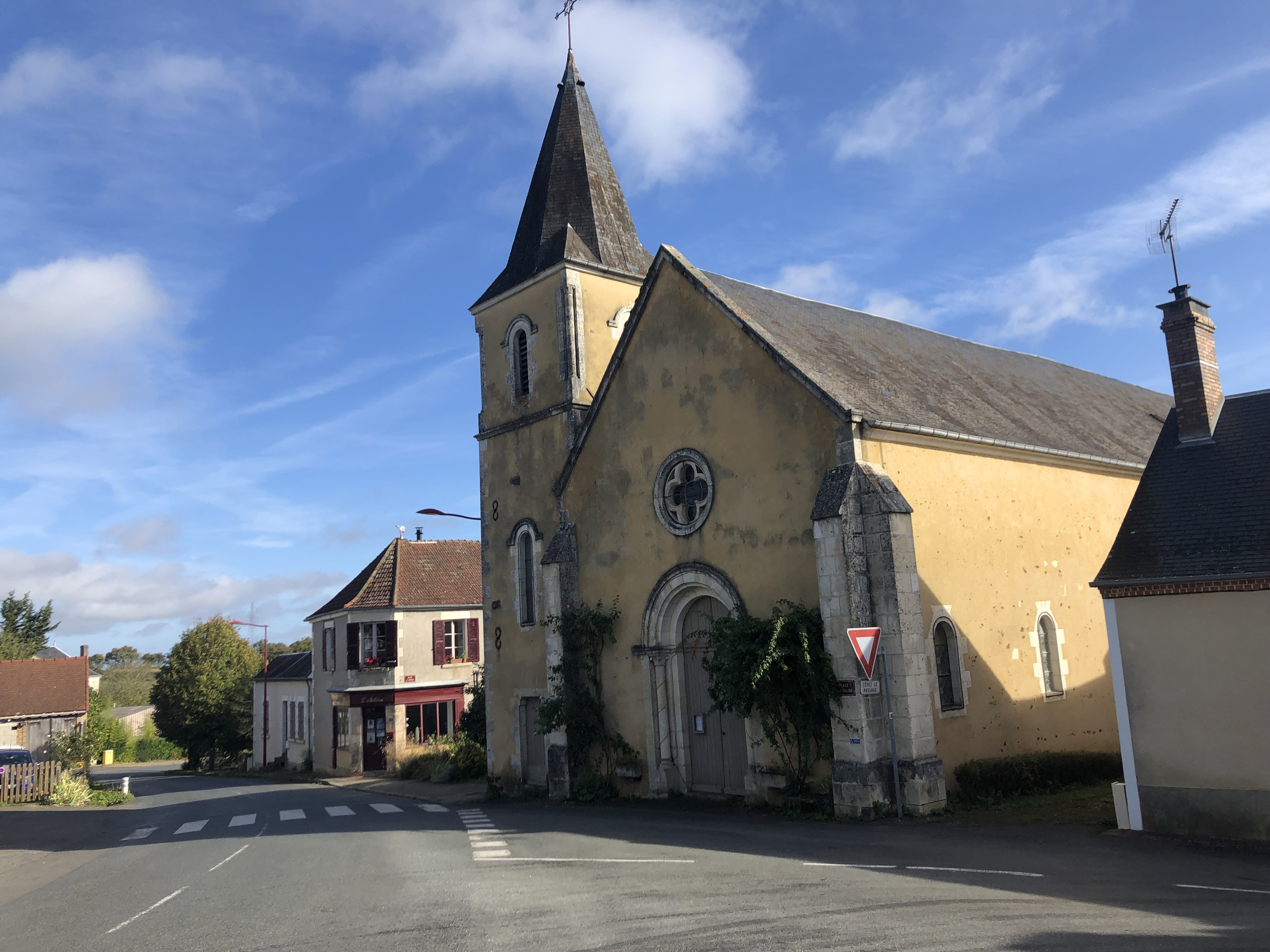
- Church
- Location of Neuilly-en-Sancerre
- Location within France Location within Centre-Val de Loire
- Coordinates: 47°18′13″N 2°41′16″E
- Country: France
- Region: Centre-Val de Loire
- Department: Cher
- Arrondissement: Bourges
- Canton: Saint-Germain-du-Puy
- Intercommunality: CC Terres du Haut Berry

Government
  - Mayor (2020–2026): Isabelle Crochet
- Area^{1}: 26.05 km^{2} (10.06 sq mi)
- Elevation: 280 m (920 ft)
- Highest elevation: 422 m (1,385 ft)
- Lowest elevation: 238 m (781 ft)
- Population (2023): 244
  - Density: 9.37/km^{2} (24.3/sq mi)
- Time zone: UTC+01:00 (CET)
  - Summer (DST): UTC+02:00 (CEST)
- INSEE/Postal code: 18162 /18250
- ^{1} French Land Register data, which excludes lakes, ponds, glaciers > 1 km^{2} (0.386 sq mi or 247 acres) and river estuaries.

Neuilly-en-Sancerre (French pronunciation: [nøji ɑ̃ sɑ̃sɛʁ]) is a commune in the Cher department in the Centre-Val de Loire region of France.

== Geography ==
An area of forestry and farming comprising the village and a couple of hamlets, situated by the banks of the Sauldre river some 21 miles (34 km) northeast of Bourges, at the junction of the D22 with the D74 and D196 roads.

== Population ==
Historical population
Year	Pop.	±% p.a.
1968	304	—
1975	276	−1.37%
1982	252	−1.29%
1990	192	−3.34%
1999	212	+1.11%
2007	231	+1.08%
2012	241	+0.85%
2017	253	+0.98%
2023	244	−0.60%
Source: INSEE

== Sights ==
- The church of St. Martial, dating from the twelfth century.
- The remains of the donjon of a feudal castle.

== See also ==
- Communes of the Cher department
