= Brécy, Cher =

Brécy
- Commune
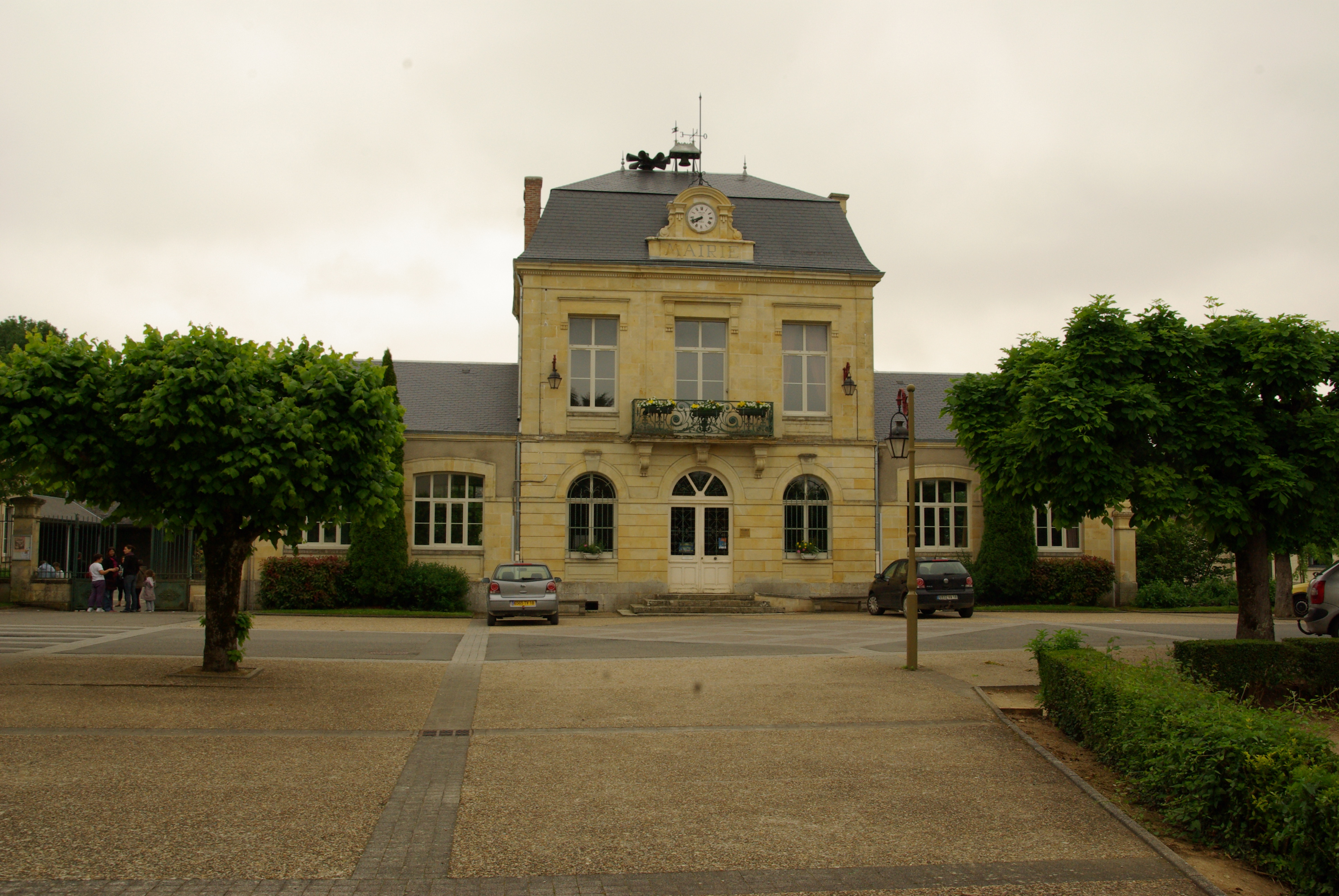
- Town hall

- Coat of arms
- Location of Brécy
- Location within France Location within Centre-Val de Loire
- Coordinates: 47°07′30″N 2°37′13″E
- Country: France
- Region: Centre-Val de Loire
- Department: Cher
- Arrondissement: Bourges
- Canton: Saint-Germain-du-Puy
- Intercommunality: CC Terres du Haut Berry

Government
  - Mayor (2020–2026): Christian Ferrand
- Area^{1}: 39.63 km^{2} (15.30 sq mi)
- Highest elevation: 229 m (751 ft)
- Lowest elevation: 149 m (489 ft)
- Population (2023): 927
  - Density: 23.4/km^{2} (60.6/sq mi)
- Time zone: UTC+01:00 (CET)
  - Summer (DST): UTC+02:00 (CEST)
- INSEE/Postal code: 18035 /18220
- ^{1} French Land Register data, which excludes lakes, ponds, glaciers > 1 km^{2} (0.386 sq mi or 247 acres) and river estuaries.

Brécy (French pronunciation: [bʁesi]) is a commune in the Cher department in the Centre-Val de Loire region of France.

== Geography ==
An area of forestry and farming comprising the village and five hamlets situated by the banks of the Tripande river, some 10 miles (16 km) east of Bourges at the junction of the D151 with the D12 and D52 roads. The commune lies on the pilgrimage route known as the Way of St. James.

== Population ==
Historical population
Year	Pop.	±% p.a.
1968	555	—
1975	488	−1.82%
1982	503	+0.43%
1990	692	+4.07%
1999	706	+0.22%
2007	770	+1.09%
2012	868	+2.42%
2017	1,013	+3.14%
2023	927	−1.47%
Source: INSEE

== Sights ==
- The church of St. Germain, dating from the twelfth century.
- The twelfth century chapel at Francheville, originally a Knights Templar commandry.
- Several ancient buildings at the hamlets of Guilly and Francheville.

== See also ==
- Communes of the Cher department
