= Saint-Germain-du-Puy =

- Commune
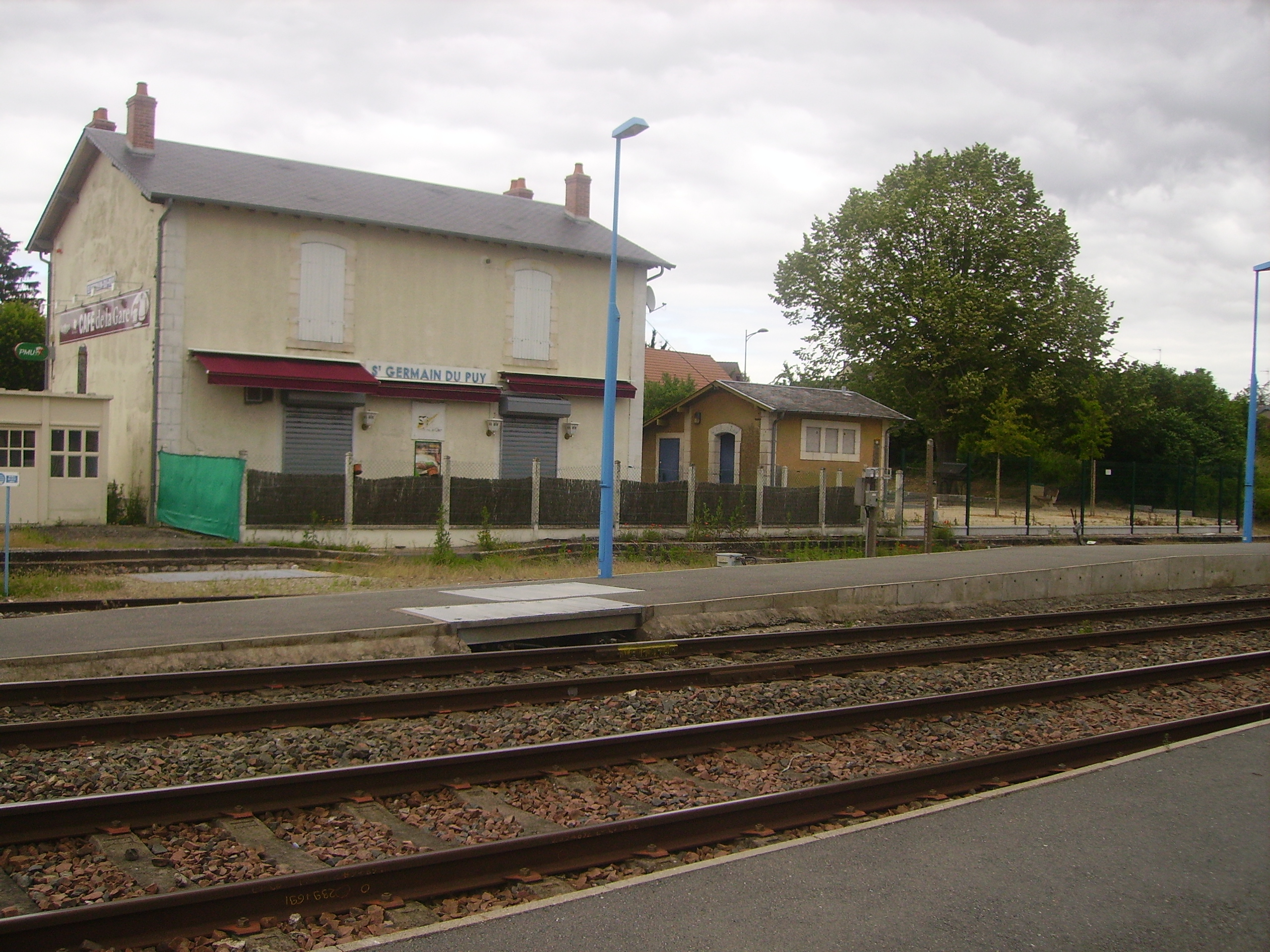
- Saint-Germain-du-Puy railway station
- Location of Saint-Germain-du-Puy
- Location within France Location within Centre-Val de Loire
- Coordinates: 47°06′00″N 2°28′55″E
- Country: France
- Region: Centre-Val de Loire
- Department: Cher
- Arrondissement: Bourges
- Canton: Saint-Germain-du-Puy
- Intercommunality: CA Bourges Plus

Government
  - Mayor (2020–2026): Marie-Christine Baudouin
- Area^{1}: 21.63 km^{2} (8.35 sq mi)
- Highest elevation: 174 m (571 ft)
- Lowest elevation: 126 m (413 ft)
- Population (2023): 4,779
  - Density: 220.9/km^{2} (572.2/sq mi)
- Time zone: UTC+01:00 (CET)
  - Summer (DST): UTC+02:00 (CEST)
- INSEE/Postal code: 18213 /18390
- ^{1} French Land Register data, which excludes lakes, ponds, glaciers > 1 km^{2} (0.386 sq mi or 247 acres) and river estuaries.

Saint-Germain-du-Puy (French pronunciation: [sɛ̃ ʒɛʁmɛ̃ dy pɥi]) is a commune in the Cher department in the Centre-Val de Loire region of France.

== Geography ==
An area of both farming and light industry comprising a small suburban town and several hamlets situated on the banks of the rivers Colin and Yèvre, immediately east of Bourges at the junction of the N151 with the N142, D955 and D151 roads.

== Population ==
Historical population
Year	Pop.	±% p.a.
1968	1,814	—
1975	4,262	+12.98%
1982	4,997	+2.30%
1990	5,085	+0.22%
1999	5,007	−0.17%
2007	4,846	−0.41%
2012	5,029	+0.74%
2017	5,085	+0.22%
2023	4,779	−1.03%
Source: INSEE

== Sights ==
- The church of St. Germain, dating from the twentieth century.
- The château de Villemenard, built in the sixteenth century, now a farm.
- The two 16th-century watermills.
- The remains of a Roman aqueduct.

== See also ==
- Communes of the Cher department
