= Les Aix-d'Angillon =

- Commune
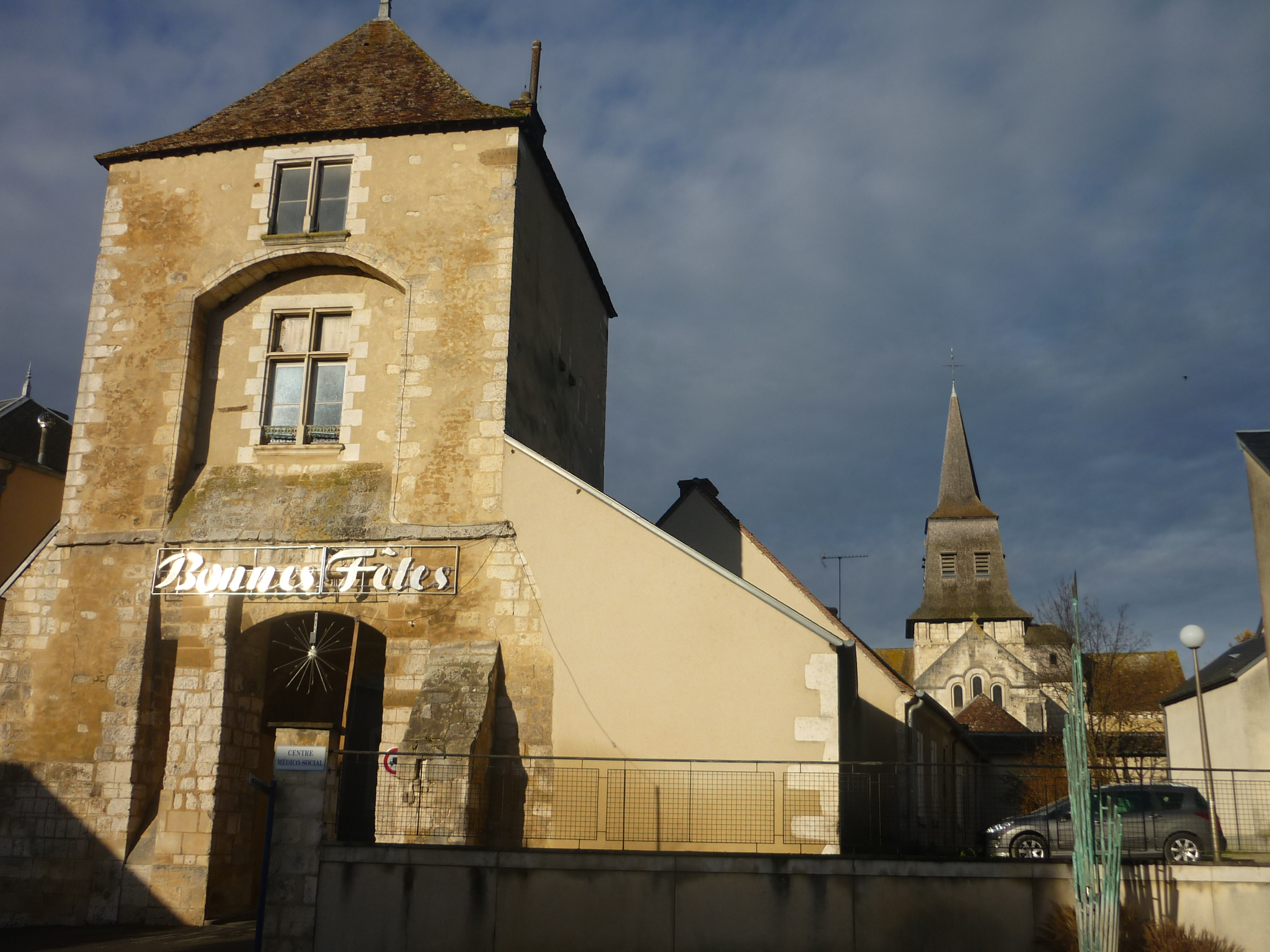
- Collegiate Church of St-Germain and another building, in Les Aix-d'Angillon

- Coat of arms
- Location of Les Aix-d'Angillon
- Location within France Location within Centre-Val de Loire
- Coordinates: 47°11′56″N 2°34′21″E
- Country: France
- Region: Centre-Val de Loire
- Department: Cher
- Arrondissement: Bourges
- Canton: Saint-Germain-du-Puy
- Intercommunality: CC Terres du Haut Berry

Government
  - Mayor (2020–2026): Christelle Petit
- Area^{1}: 14.68 km^{2} (5.67 sq mi)
- Elevation: 82 m (269 ft)
- Highest elevation: 211 m (692 ft)
- Lowest elevation: 163 m (535 ft)
- Population (2023): 1,877
  - Density: 127.9/km^{2} (331.2/sq mi)
- Time zone: UTC+01:00 (CET)
  - Summer (DST): UTC+02:00 (CEST)
- INSEE/Postal code: 18003 /18220
- ^{1} French Land Register data, which excludes lakes, ponds, glaciers > 1 km^{2} (0.386 sq mi or 247 acres) and river estuaries.

Les Aix-d’Angillon (French pronunciation: [le.z‿ɛks dɑ̃ʒijɔ̃]) is a commune in the Cher department in the Centre-Val de Loire region of France.

== Geography ==
A small farming town, with a little associated light industry, situated some 11 miles (18 km) northeast of Bourges, at the junction of the D955, D25, D12 and the D46 roads. The small rivers Colin and Quatier flow southward through the commune.

== Population ==
Historical population
Year	Pop.	±% p.a.
1968	1,246	—
1975	1,945	+6.57%
1982	2,146	+1.41%
1990	2,160	+0.08%
1999	2,006	−0.82%
2007	1,927	−0.50%
2012	1,917	−0.10%
2017	1,916	−0.01%
2023	1,877	−0.34%
Source: INSEE

== Sights ==
- A sixteenth century hospice.
- The church of Notre-Dame, dating from the twelfth century.
- The church of St. Germain de Valentigny.
- Traces of the feudal castle.

== See also ==
- Communes of the Cher department
