= Morogues =

- Commune
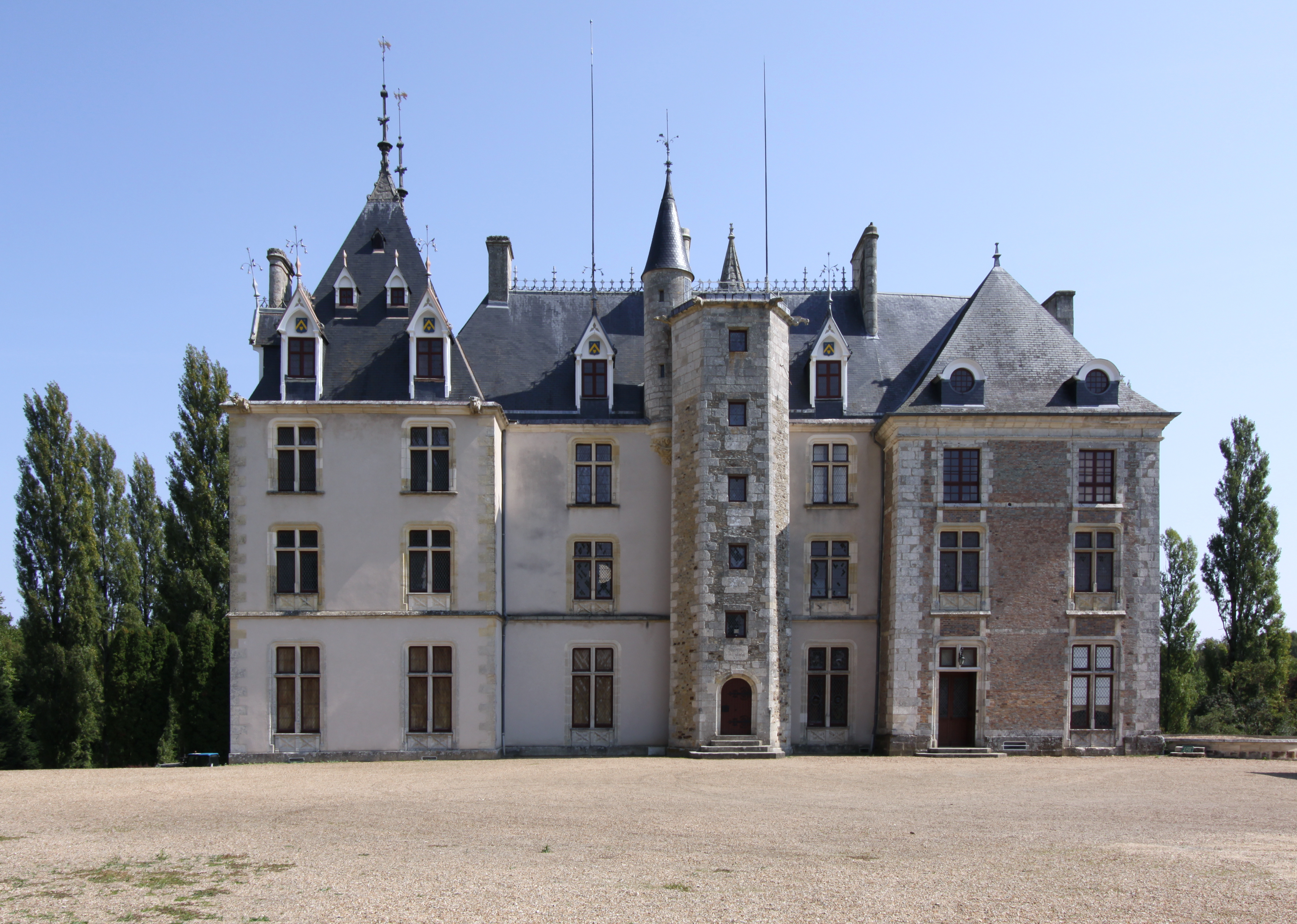
- The Château of Maupas
- Location of Morogues
- Location within France Location within Centre-Val de Loire
- Coordinates: 47°14′30″N 2°35′55″E
- Country: France
- Region: Centre-Val de Loire
- Department: Cher
- Arrondissement: Bourges
- Canton: Saint-Germain-du-Puy
- Intercommunality: CC Terres du Haut Berry

Government
  - Mayor (2020–2026): Gérard Clavier
- Area^{1}: 30.53 km^{2} (11.79 sq mi)
- Elevation: 210 m (690 ft)
- Highest elevation: 427 m (1,401 ft)
- Lowest elevation: 200 m (660 ft)
- Population (2023): 424
  - Density: 13.9/km^{2} (36.0/sq mi)
- Time zone: UTC+01:00 (CET)
  - Summer (DST): UTC+02:00 (CEST)
- INSEE/Postal code: 18156 /18220
- ^{1} French Land Register data, which excludes lakes, ponds, glaciers > 1 km^{2} (0.386 sq mi or 247 acres) and river estuaries.

Morogues (French pronunciation: [mɔʁɔɡ]) is a commune in the Cher department in the Centre-Val de Loire region of France.

== Geography ==
An area of forestry, vineyards and farming, comprising the village and a couple of hamlets situated some 15 miles (24 km) northeast of Bourges, at the junction of the D185 with the D59 and D212 roads.

== Population ==
Historical population
| Year | Pop. | ±% p.a. |
|---|---|---|
| 1968 | 492 | — |
| 1975 | 397 | −3.02% |
| 1982 | 376 | −0.77% |
| 1990 | 456 | +2.44% |
| 1999 | 424 | −0.81% |
| 2007 | 468 | +1.24% |
| 2012 | 415 | −2.38% |
| 2017 | 438 | +1.08% |
| 2023 | 424 | −0.54% |
Source: INSEE

== Sights ==
- The church of St. Symphorien, dating from the twelfth century.
- The fifteenth-century chateau of Maupas.
- A watermill, the “Moulin Quenouille”.

== See also ==
- Communes of the Cher department
