= Sainte-Solange =

- Commune
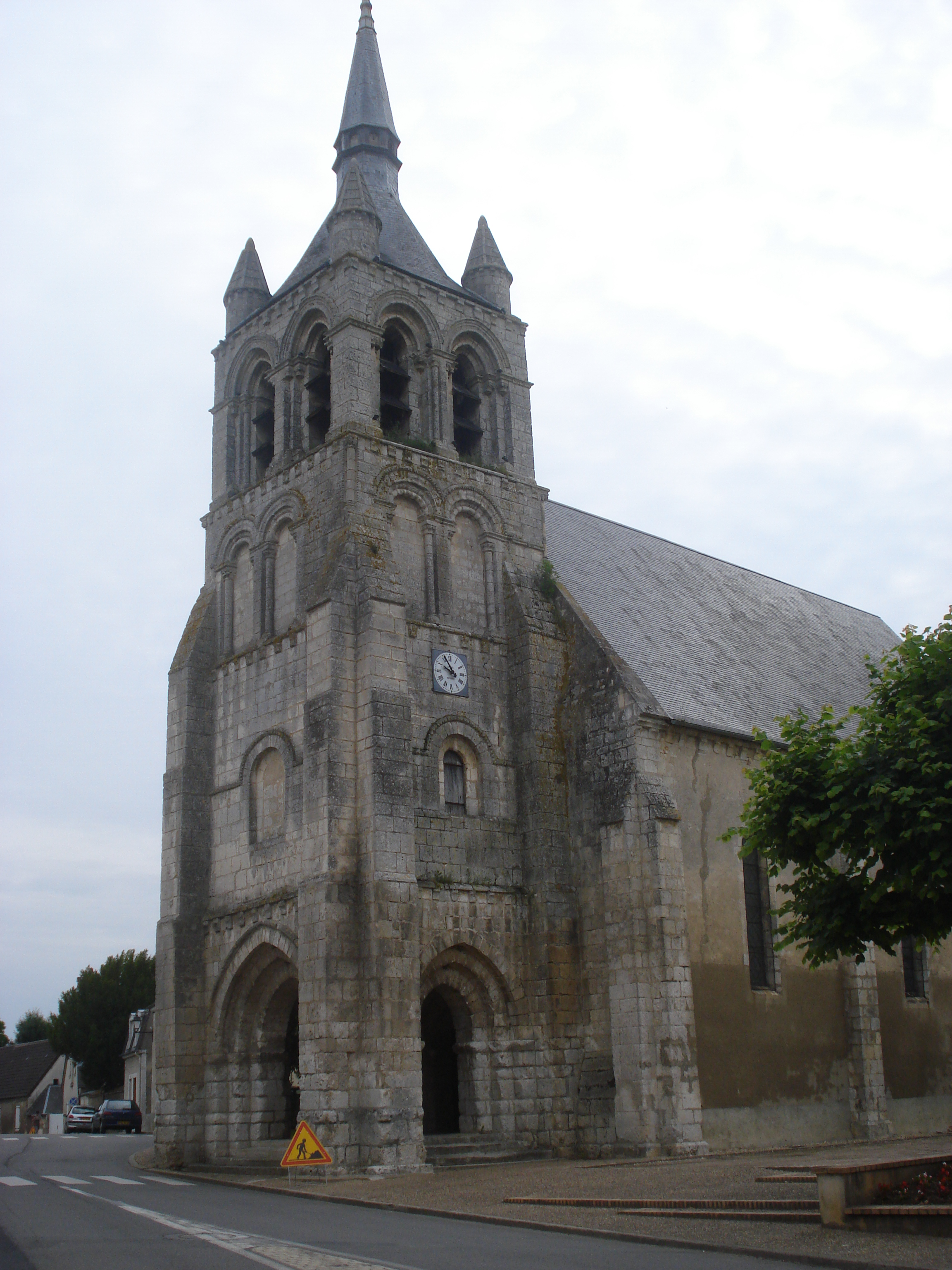
- The church in Sainte-Solange
- Location of Sainte-Solange
- Location within France Location within Centre-Val de Loire
- Coordinates: 47°08′14″N 2°33′02″E
- Country: France
- Region: Centre-Val de Loire
- Department: Cher
- Arrondissement: Bourges
- Canton: Saint-Germain-du-Puy
- Intercommunality: CC Terres du Haut Berry

Government
  - Mayor (2020–2026): Ghislaine de Bengy-Puyvallée
- Area^{1}: 31.85 km^{2} (12.30 sq mi)
- Elevation: 162 m (531 ft)
- Highest elevation: 179 m (587 ft)
- Lowest elevation: 142 m (466 ft)
- Population (2023): 1,111
  - Density: 34.88/km^{2} (90.34/sq mi)
- Time zone: UTC+01:00 (CET)
  - Summer (DST): UTC+02:00 (CEST)
- INSEE/Postal code: 18235 /18220
- ^{1} French Land Register data, which excludes lakes, ponds, glaciers > 1 km^{2} (0.386 sq mi or 247 acres) and river estuaries.

Sainte-Solange (French pronunciation: [sɛ̃t sɔlɑ̃ʒ]) is a commune in the Cher department in central France.

== Population ==
Historical population
Year	Pop.	±% p.a.
1968	594	—
1975	846	+5.18%
1982	1,089	+3.67%
1990	1,257	+1.81%
1999	1,304	+0.41%
2007	1,204	−0.99%
2012	1,186	−0.30%
2017	1,135	−0.88%
2023	1,111	−0.36%
Source: INSEE

== See also ==
- Communes of the Cher department
