= Aubinges =

- Commune
- Location of Aubinges
- Location within France Location within Centre-Val de Loire
- Coordinates: 47°13′23″N 2°34′59″E
- Country: France
- Region: Centre-Val de Loire
- Department: Cher
- Arrondissement: Bourges
- Canton: Saint-Germain-du-Puy
- Intercommunality: CC Terres Haut Berry

Government
  - Mayor (2020–2026): Pascale Rouzier
- Area^{1}: 10.97 km^{2} (4.24 sq mi)
- Elevation: 200 m (660 ft)
- Highest elevation: 262 m (860 ft)
- Lowest elevation: 184 m (604 ft)
- Population (2023): 401
  - Density: 36.6/km^{2} (94.7/sq mi)
- Time zone: UTC+01:00 (CET)
  - Summer (DST): UTC+02:00 (CEST)
- INSEE/Postal code: 18016 /18220
- ^{1} French Land Register data, which excludes lakes, ponds, glaciers > 1 km^{2} (0.386 sq mi or 247 acres) and river estuaries.

Aubinges (French pronunciation: [obɛ̃ʒ]) is a commune in the Cher department in the Centre-Val de Loire region of France.

== Geography ==
A farming area comprising the village and three hamlets is situated by the banks of the river Colin, some 14 miles (23 km) northeast of Bourges, near the junction of the D133 with the D12 and the D46 roads.

== Population ==
Historical population
| Year | Pop. | ±% p.a. |
|---|---|---|
| 1968 | 281 | — |
| 1975 | 260 | −1.10% |
| 1982 | 226 | −1.98% |
| 1990 | 279 | +2.67% |
| 1999 | 333 | +1.99% |
| 2007 | 370 | +1.33% |
| 2012 | 336 | −1.91% |
| 2017 | 394 | +3.24% |
| 2023 | 401 | +0.29% |
Source: INSEE
