= Canton of Vailly-sur-Sauldre =

Coordinates: 47°27′31″N 2°39′4″E

Vailly-sur-Sauldre
- Former canton
- Interactive map of Vailly-sur-Sauldre
- Country: France
- Region: Centre-Val de Loire
- Department: Cher
- No. of communes: {{{nbcomm}}}
- Disbanded: 2015
- Area: 241.27 km^{2} (93.15 sq mi)
- Population (2012): 3,409
  - Density: 14.13/km^{2} (36.59/sq mi)

The Canton of Vailly-sur-Sauldre is a former canton situated in the Cher département and in the Centre region of France. It was disbanded following the French canton reorganisation which came into effect in March 2015. It consisted of 11 communes, which joined the canton of Sancerre in 2015. It had 3,409 inhabitants (2012).

== Geography ==
A farming area in the valley of the river Loire, in the northeastern part of the arrondissement of Bourges centred on the town of Vailly-sur-Sauldre. The altitude varies from 175m at Concressault to 374m at Le Noyer, with an average altitude of 274m.

The canton comprised 11 communes:

- Assigny
- Barlieu
- Concressault
- Dampierre-en-Crot
- Jars
- Le Noyer
- Subligny
- Sury-ès-Bois
- Thou
- Vailly-sur-Sauldre
- Villegenon

== Population ==
Historical population Canton of Vailly-sur-Sauldre
Year	1962	1968	1975	1982	1990	1999
Pop.	4,064	4,628	4,067	3,880	3,763	3,498
±%	—	+13.9%	−12.1%	−4.6%	−3.0%	−7.0%
From the year 1962 on: No double counting – residents of multiple communes (e.g. students and military personnel) are counted only once. Source: INSEE

== See also ==
- Arrondissements of the Cher department
- Cantons of the Cher department
- Communes of the Cher department
