= Communauté de communes Cœur du Pays Fort =

Cœur du Pays Fort
- Former communauté de communes
- Country: France
- Region: Centre-Val de Loire
- Department: Cher
- No. of communes: {{{nbcomm}}}
- Established: 2003
- Disbanded: 2017
- Area: 241.27 km^{2} (93.15 sq mi)
- Population (1999): 3,630
  - Density: 15.0/km^{2} (39.0/sq mi)

The communauté de communes Cœur du Pays Fort was created on December 4, 2002, and was located in the Cher département of the Centre-Val de Loire region of France. It was created in January 2003. It was merged into the new Communauté de communes Pays Fort Sancerrois Val de Loire in January 2017.

The Communauté de communes comprised the following communes:

1. Assigny
2. Barlieu
3. Concressault
4. Dampierre-en-Crot
5. Jars
6. Le Noyer
7. Subligny
8. Sury-ès-Bois
9. Thou
10. Vailly-sur-Sauldre
11. Villegenon
