= Sancerre =

- Commune
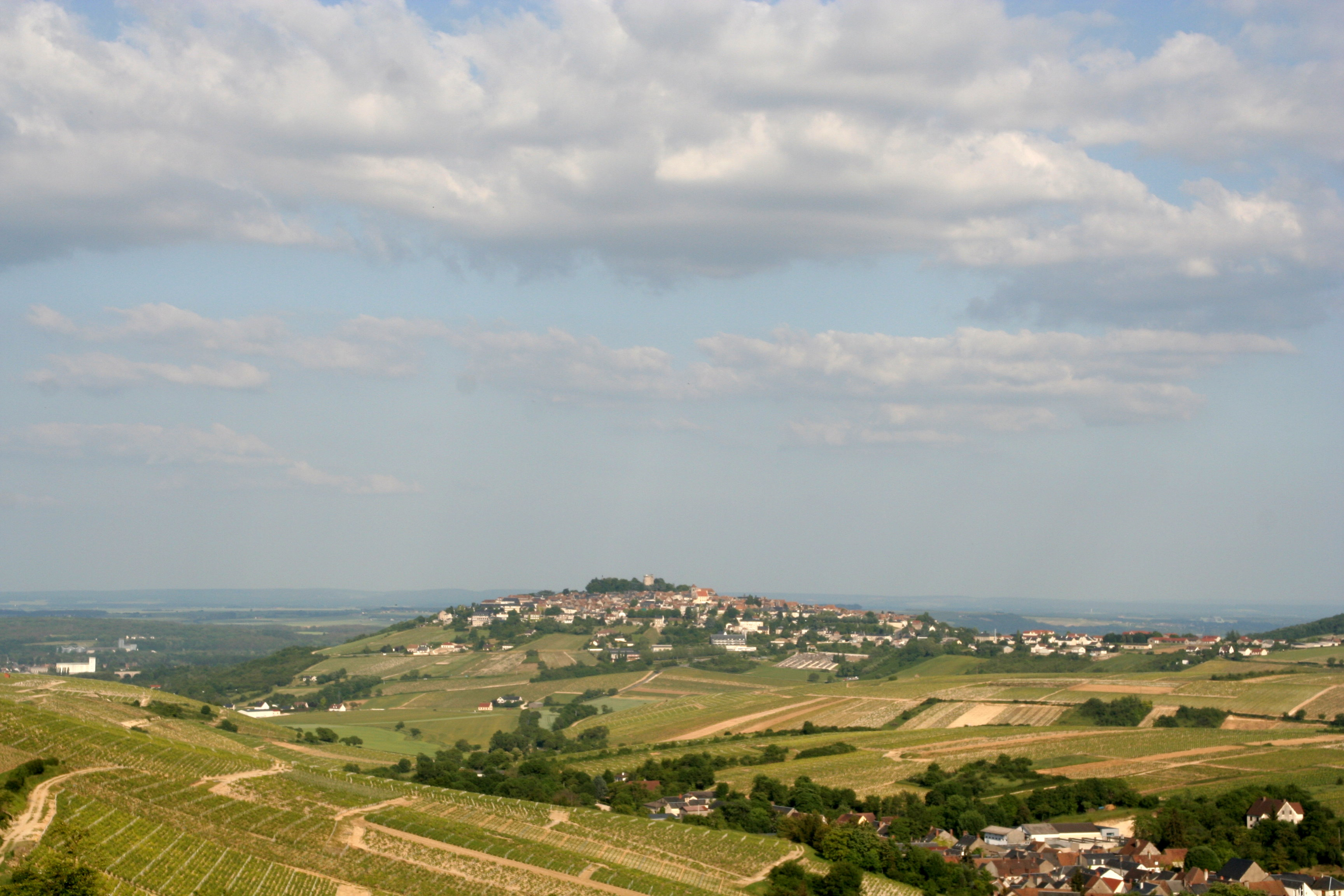
- A general view of Sancerre

- Coat of arms
- Location of Sancerre
- Location within France Location within Centre-Val de Loire
- Coordinates: 47°19′55″N 2°50′24″E
- Country: France
- Region: Centre-Val de Loire
- Department: Cher
- Arrondissement: Bourges
- Canton: Sancerre
- Intercommunality: CC Pays Fort Sancerrois Val de Loire

Government
  - Mayor (2020–2026): Laurent Pabiot
- Area^{1}: 16.27 km^{2} (6.28 sq mi)
- Elevation: 310 m (1,020 ft)
- Highest elevation: 366 m (1,201 ft)
- Lowest elevation: 146 m (479 ft)
- Population (2023): 1,269
  - Density: 78.00/km^{2} (202.0/sq mi)
- Demonym: Sancerrois·e
- Time zone: UTC+01:00 (CET)
  - Summer (DST): UTC+02:00 (CEST)
- INSEE/Postal code: 18241 /18300
- ^{1} French Land Register data, which excludes lakes, ponds, glaciers > 1 km^{2} (0.386 sq mi or 247 acres) and river estuaries.

Sancerre (French pronunciation: [sɑ̃sɛʁ]) is a medieval hilltop town and commune in the department of Cher, Centre-Val de Loire, France, overlooking the river Loire. It is a member of Les Plus Beaux Villages de France (The Most Beautiful Villages of France) Association, noted for its wine and for inventing Crottin de Chavignol Cheese.

== History ==
Located in the area of Gaul settled by the powerful Celtic (Gaule Celtique) tribe, the Bituriges, or the "Kings of the World", and after their defeat at Bourges (Avaricum), part of Roman Aquitania. Some evidence points to the existence of an early hillside Roman temple dedicated to Julius Caesar; located on the Roman road (Gordaine) from Bourges to the river town of Gordona (Castle-Gordon), now Saint Thibault and Saint Satur. Name possibly derived from "Sacred to Caesar" and later Christianized to "Saint-Cere". During the Carolingian period there was a small village on the hillside, clustered around the Saint Romble Church. An Augustinian abbey was founded in Saint Satur in 1034. A natural fortress 312 meters in height, Sancerre is a former feudal possession of the counts of Champagne (1152) in the province of Berry. They built a chateau on the hill and ramparts to protect the city. The chateau had six towers including the Tower of the Strongholds (Tour des Fiefs) and the Tower of Saint George. In times of war, a fire was lit on the top of the Saint George tower that could be seen for 40 kilometres (25 mi) around. The Customs of Lorris (1155), a charter granted by Stephen I to the merchants of Sancerre was considered one of the most progressive in the Capetian kingdom. In 1184, the count of Sancerre led a band of rebels called the Brabançons against the king. They were defeated by the Confrères de la Paix, the Confraternity of Peace, a group charged with keeping order in the kingdom. In 1190, Stephen I was among the first feudal lords to abolish serfdom. The fortified city repelled the English forces twice during the Hundred Years' War but much of the surrounding area, including the Augustinian Abbey in Saint Satur and Saint Romble, were destroyed by the forces of Edward, the Black Prince. Sancerre was the seat of Joan of Arc's great comrade-in-arms, Jean V de Bueil.

Sancerre was also the site of the infamous siege of Sancerre (1572–1573) during the Wars of Religion where the Huguenot population held out for nearly eight months against the Catholic forces of the king. The siege was one of the last times in European history where slings (trebuchet), the "Arquebuses of Sancerre", were used in warfare. The siege was documented by a Protestant minister who survived the battle, Jean de Léry, in The Memorable History of the Siege of Sancerre. In 1621 much of the feudal chateau and city walls were destroyed by orders of the king to prevent further resistance. In 1637 the county was sold by Rene de Bueil to the prince of Condé, Henry II of Bourbon, the governor of Berry. The area suffered economically from the mass exodus of Protestant merchants, tradesmen and others during the 17th century, especially after the revocation of the Edict of Nantes (1685).

During the French Revolution, Sancerre was the site of a royalist rebellion led by Louis-Edmond de Phelippeaux – small "Vendee Sancerroise". Sancerre was designated the seat of government for the district during the First Republic, but in 1926 the sous-préfecture and other administrative services were transferred to Bourges. Count Jean-Pierre de Montalivet, of Chateau de Thauvenay, Minister of the Interior under Napoleon, was a large landowner in Sancerre during the 19th century.

Area transportation was improved by the construction of a suspension bridge at Saint Thibault (1834), the Lateral Canal of the Loire (1838) and later, the Bourges-Sancerre railroad line (1885). A mansion was built on the ruins of the original Chateau de Sancerre in 1874 by Mlle de Crussol d'Uzès in the style of Louis XII. In 1919, the mansion and part of the vineyards were purchased by Louis-Alexandre Marnier-Lapostolle, the liqueur manufacturer. During World War I, Sancerre was the site of a military hospital.

During World War II, Sancerre was a regional command center for the French Resistance. "Operation Spencer” in 1944 was to prevent the Germans from crossing the river Loire between Gien and Nevers and reinforcing troops in Brittany. The French Resistance and Free French Forces blew up the bridge at Sancerre and sabotaged communication, road, canal and railway lines. On 25 June 1944 German troops based in Cosne-sur-Loire set fire to the village of Thauvenay in reprisal for an ambush of the French Resistance, burning 23 houses, executing six men, a 7-year-old boy and taking eleven people hostage. Among the hostages was Paul de Lavenne de Choulot, comte de Chabaud la Tour, owner of Chateau de Thauvenay. Taken to Bourges, Paul de Choulot pleaded to Alfred Stanke, the "Franciscan of Bourges", a German monk and medical orderly who helped save hundreds during World War II, to spare the rest of the commune.

== Economy ==
Known principally for the production of red wine from the Pinot noir grape until the 20th century, the Sancerre area was devastated by phylloxera in the late 19th century. The vineyards were replanted in Sauvignon blanc (also see Sancerre (wine)). In 1936 Sancerre white was given AOC (INAO) status; reds were classified in 1959. The area now produces white, red and rose wine. The following communes fall inside the "Sancerre" and "Sancerre-Loire Valley" controlled label of origin area: Bannay, Bué, Crézancy-en-Sancerre, Menetou-Râtel, Ménétréol-sous-Sancerre, Montigny, Saint-Satur, Sainte-Gemme-en-Sancerrois, Sancerre, Sury-en-Vaux, Thauvenay, Veaugues, Verdigny et Vinon.

The area is also noted for its goat cheese. The nearby village of Chavignol, which gave its name to the cheese – Crottin de Chavignol – is located on the territory of the commune.

== Population ==
Historical population
Year	Pop.	±% p.a.
1968	2,461	—
1975	2,460	−0.01%
1982	2,139	−1.98%
1990	2,059	−0.48%
1999	1,799	−1.49%
2007	1,727	−0.51%
2012	1,541	−2.25%
2017	1,393	−2.00%
2023	1,269	−1.54%
Source: INSEE

== Sights ==
Of architectural significance: Belfry of St. Jean, a 16th-century bell tower built by the prosperous merchants of Sancerre; Tour des Fiefs (1390), the lone remaining tower of the feudal chateau; and the ruins of Saint Romble, a medieval church destroyed by the English.

Jacques Coeur house: 15th-century house owned at one time by Jacques Coeur, financier and royal adviser to King Charles VII.

Maison des Sancerre: Wine exposition located in 14th–16th-century house with tower.

Hotel de la Thaumassière: 17th-century house built by César Thaumassière, doctor of Henry II of Bourbon.

The city is a cobweb of twisted streets with many buildings surviving from the Middle Ages.

== International relations ==
Sancerre is twinned with

- Eccleshall in Staffordshire, England.

== Personalities ==
- Stephen I of Sancerre (Étienne I), Count of Sancerre (1133–1191) Crusader; died at the siege of Acre.
- Etienne II of Sancerre, Count of Sancerre (1252–1306) Grand Bouteiller of France
- Louis II de Sancerre, Count of Sancerre (died 26 August 1346) One of the few French nobles to penetrate the English front line at the Battle of Crécy. Killed in the battle.
- Louis de Sancerre, Marshal of France, Constable of France (1342–1402) Buried in Saint Denis Basilica near King Charles V.
- Stephen of Sancerre, Lord of Vailly (d. 1390 in Tunis) Died fighting the Moors under the command of Louis II de Bourbon, Duke of Bourbon (1337–1410).
- Jean V de Bueil, Admiral of France (1406–1477) The Plague of the English and author of Le Jouvencel.
- Jean de Léry, Protestant minister and author, History of a Voyage to the Land of Brazil, 1578 and The Memorable History of the Siege of Sancerre, 1574.
- Samuel Bernard, comte de Coubert (1651–1739) Protestant Financier
- Count Louis of Sancerre, companion of explorer Sieur de la Salle, 1682.
- Jean-Charles Perrinet d'Orval (1707–1782), pyrotechnician
- Étienne MacDonald, Duke of Taranto, Marshal of France (1765–1840) Napoleon made him Marshal of France on the battlefield at Wagram.
- Jean-Pierre Bachasson, comte de Montalivet (1766–1823) French statesman
- Louis Mairet, Commander of the Legion of Honor, Companion of the Order of Liberation (1916–1998) Parachutist with the Free French Squadron; destroyed the bridge at Sancerre in World War II.
- Béatrice Bulteau (1959–2024), equine artist

== See also ==
- Communes of the Cher department

== Sources ==
- Waite, Gary K (2015). Exile and Religious Identity, 1500–1800. Taylor & Francis.
