= Canton of Léré =

Coordinates: 47°28′15″N 2°52′26″E

Léré
- Former canton
- Interactive map of Léré
- Country: France
- Region: Centre-Val de Loire
- Department: Cher
- No. of communes: {{{nbcomm}}}
- Disbanded: 2015
- Area: 149.94 km^{2} (57.89 sq mi)
- Population (2012): 5,960
  - Density: 39.7/km^{2} (103/sq mi)

The Canton of Léré is a former canton situated in the Cher département and in the Centre region of France. It was disbanded following the French canton reorganisation which came into effect in March 2015. It consisted of 7 communes, which joined the canton of Sancerre in 2015. It had 5,960 inhabitants (2012).

== Geography ==
A farming and forestry area in the arrondissement of Bourges. centred on the town of Léré. The altitude varies from 132m at Sainte-Gemme-en-Sancerrois to 303m at Léré, with an average altitude of 200m.

The canton comprised 7 communes:

- Belleville-sur-Loire
- Boulleret
- Léré
- Sainte-Gemme-en-Sancerrois
- Santranges
- Savigny-en-Sancerre
- Sury-près-Léré

== Population ==
Historical population Canton of Léré
Year	1962	1968	1975	1982	1990	1999
Pop.	4,528	4,758	4,499	4,840	5,855	6,122
±%	—	+5.1%	−5.4%	+7.6%	+21.0%	+4.6%
From the year 1962 on: No double counting – residents of multiple communes (e.g. students and military personnel) are counted only once. Source: INSEE

== See also ==
- Arrondissements of the Cher department
- Cantons of the Cher department
- Communes of the Cher department
