= Arrondissement of Bourges =

Coordinates: 47.0844°N 2.3964°E

Bourges
- Arrondissement
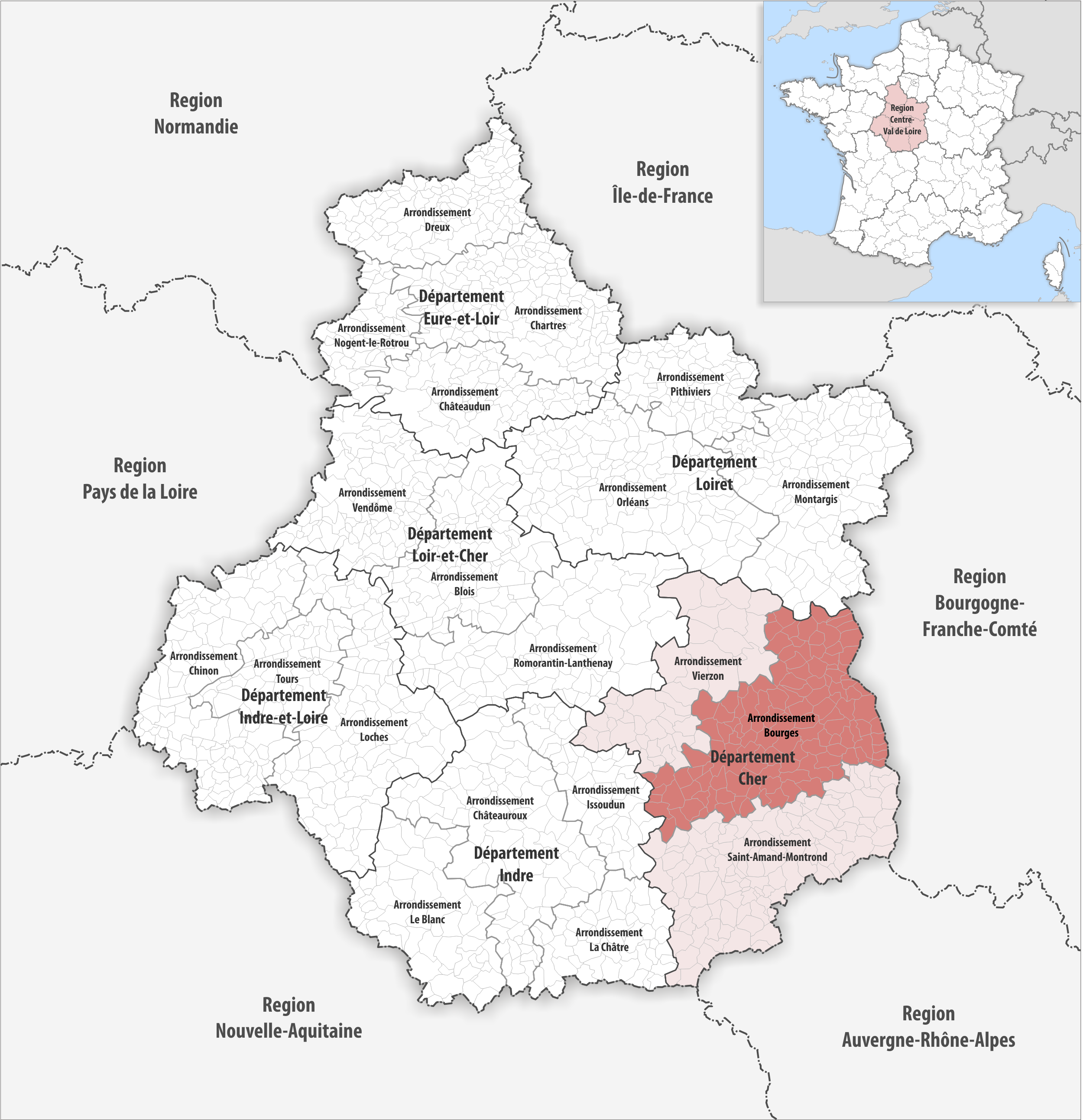
- Location within the region Centre-Val de Loire
- Country: France
- Region: Centre-Val de Loire
- Department: Cher
- No. of communes: {{{nbcomm}}}
- Area: 2,783.9 km^{2} (1,074.9 sq mi)
- Population (2023): 170,509
  - Density: 61.248/km^{2} (158.63/sq mi)
- INSEE code: 181

The arrondissement of Bourges is an arrondissement of France in the Cher department in the Centre-Val de Loire region. It has 128 communes. Its population is 170,322 (2021), and its area is 2,783.9 km^{2} (1,074.9 sq mi).

== Composition ==
The communes of the arrondissement of Bourges, and their INSEE codes, are:

1. Achères (18001)
2. Les Aix-d'Angillon (18003)
3. Allogny (18004)
4. Annoix (18006)
5. Arçay (18008)
6. Argenvières (18012)
7. Assigny (18014)
8. Aubinges (18016)
9. Avord (18018)
10. Azy (18019)
11. Bannay (18020)
12. Barlieu (18022)
13. Baugy (18023)
14. Beffes (18025)
15. Belleville-sur-Loire (18026)
16. Bengy-sur-Craon (18027)
17. Boulleret (18032)
18. Bourges (18033)
19. Brécy (18035)
20. Bué (18039)
21. La Chapelle-Montlinard (18049)
22. La Chapelle-Saint-Ursin (18050)
23. La Chapelotte (18051)
24. Charentonnay (18053)
25. Chârost (18055)
26. Chassy (18056)
27. Chaumoux-Marcilly (18061)
28. Civray (18066)
29. Concressault (18070)
30. Couargues (18074)
31. Couy (18077)
32. Crézancy-en-Sancerre (18079)
33. Crosses (18081)
34. Dampierre-en-Crot (18084)
35. Étréchy (18090)
36. Farges-en-Septaine (18092)
37. Feux (18094)
38. Fussy (18097)
39. Gardefort (18098)
40. Garigny (18099)
41. Groises (18104)
42. Gron (18105)
43. Henrichemont (18109)
44. Herry (18110)
45. Humbligny (18111)
46. Jalognes (18116)
47. Jars (18117)
48. Jussy-Champagne (18119)
49. Jussy-le-Chaudrier (18120)
50. Lapan (18122)
51. Léré (18125)
52. Levet (18126)
53. Lissay-Lochy (18129)
54. Lugny-Champagne (18132)
55. Lunery (18133)
56. Mareuil-sur-Arnon (18137)
57. Marmagne (18138)
58. Marseilles-lès-Aubigny (18139)
59. Menetou-Râtel (18144)
60. Menetou-Salon (18145)
61. Ménétréol-sous-Sancerre (18146)
62. Montigny (18151)
63. Morogues (18156)
64. Morthomiers (18157)
65. Moulins-sur-Yèvre (18158)
66. Neuilly-en-Sancerre (18162)
67. Neuvy-Deux-Clochers (18163)
68. Nohant-en-Goût (18166)
69. Le Noyer (18168)
70. Osmoy (18174)
71. Parassy (18176)
72. Pigny (18179)
73. Plaimpied-Givaudins (18180)
74. Plou (18181)
75. Poisieux (18182)
76. Précy (18184)
77. Primelles (18188)
78. Quantilly (18189)
79. Rians (18194)
80. Saint-Ambroix (18198)
81. Saint-Bouize (18200)
82. Saint-Caprais (18201)
83. Saint-Céols (18202)
84. Saint-Doulchard (18205)
85. Sainte-Gemme-en-Sancerrois (18208)
86. Saint-Éloy-de-Gy (18206)
87. Sainte-Solange (18235)
88. Saint-Florent-sur-Cher (18207)
89. Saint-Georges-sur-Moulon (18211)
90. Saint-Germain-du-Puy (18213)
91. Saint-Just (18218)
92. Saint-Léger-le-Petit (18220)
93. Saint-Martin-d'Auxigny (18223)
94. Saint-Martin-des-Champs (18224)
95. Saint-Michel-de-Volangis (18226)
96. Saint-Palais (18229)
97. Saint-Satur (18233)
98. Sancergues (18240)
99. Sancerre (18241)
100. Santranges (18243)
101. Saugy (18244)
102. Savigny-en-Sancerre (18246)
103. Savigny-en-Septaine (18247)
104. Senneçay (18248)
105. Sens-Beaujeu (18249)
106. Sévry (18251)
107. Soulangis (18253)
108. Soye-en-Septaine (18254)
109. Le Subdray (18255)
110. Subligny (18256)
111. Sury-en-Vaux (18258)
112. Sury-ès-Bois (18259)
113. Sury-près-Léré (18257)
114. Thauvenay (18262)
115. Thou (18264)
116. Trouy (18267)
117. Vailly-sur-Sauldre (18269)
118. Vasselay (18271)
119. Veaugues (18272)
120. Verdigny (18274)
121. Vignoux-sous-les-Aix (18280)
122. Villabon (18282)
123. Villegenon (18284)
124. Villeneuve-sur-Cher (18285)
125. Villequiers (18286)
126. Vinon (18287)
127. Vorly (18288)
128. Vornay (18289)

== History ==
The arrondissement of Bourges was created in 1800.

As a result of the reorganisation of the cantons of France which came into effect in 2015, the borders of the cantons are no longer related to the borders of the arrondissements. The cantons of the arrondissement of Bourges were, as of January 2015:

1. Les Aix-d'Angillon
2. Baugy
3. Bourges 1st Canton
4. Bourges 2nd Canton
5. Bourges 3rd Canton
6. Bourges 4th Canton
7. Bourges 5th Canton
8. Chârost
9. Henrichemont
10. Léré
11. Levet
12. Saint-Doulchard
13. Saint-Martin-d'Auxigny
14. Sancergues
15. Sancerre
16. Vailly-sur-Sauldre
