= Jalognes =

- Commune
- Coat of arms
- Location of Jalognes
- Location within France Location within Centre-Val de Loire
- Coordinates: 47°14′12″N 2°47′11″E
- Country: France
- Region: Centre-Val de Loire
- Department: Cher
- Arrondissement: Bourges
- Canton: Sancerre
- Intercommunality: CC Pays Fort Sancerrois Val de Loire

Government
  - Mayor (2020–2026): Patrick Léger
- Area^{1}: 28.09 km^{2} (10.85 sq mi)
- Elevation: 202 m (663 ft)
- Highest elevation: 239 m (784 ft)
- Lowest elevation: 172 m (564 ft)
- Population (2023): 264
  - Density: 9.40/km^{2} (24.3/sq mi)
- Time zone: UTC+01:00 (CET)
  - Summer (DST): UTC+02:00 (CEST)
- INSEE/Postal code: 18116 /18300
- ^{1} French Land Register data, which excludes lakes, ponds, glaciers > 1 km^{2} (0.386 sq mi or 247 acres) and river estuaries.

Jalognes (French pronunciation: [ʒalɔɲ]) is a commune in the Cher department in the Centre-Val de Loire region of France.

== Geography ==
Jalognes is in the river Bennelle about 23 miles (37 km) northeast of Bourges.

== Population ==
Historical population
Year	Pop.	±% p.a.
1968	423	—
1975	354	−2.51%
1982	295	−2.57%
1990	271	−1.06%
1999	285	+0.56%
2007	308	+0.97%
2012	285	−1.54%
2017	292	+0.49%
2023	264	−1.67%
Source: INSEE

== See also ==
- Communes of the Cher department
