= Feux =

- Commune
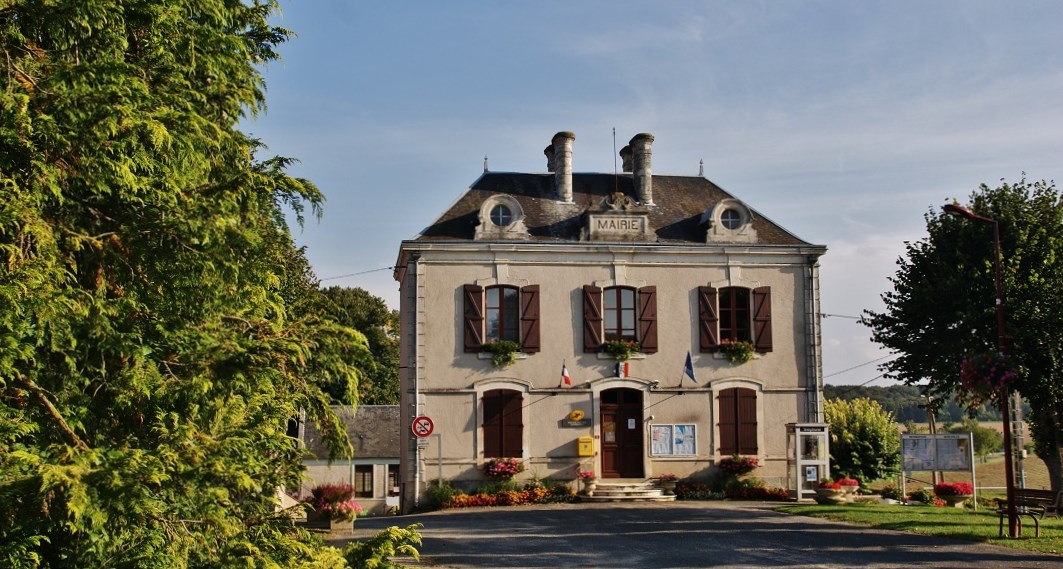
- The town hall in Feux
- Location of Feux
- Location within France Location within Centre-Val de Loire
- Coordinates: 47°13′52″N 2°51′31″E
- Country: France
- Region: Centre-Val de Loire
- Department: Cher
- Arrondissement: Bourges
- Canton: Sancerre
- Intercommunality: CC Pays Fort Sancerrois Val de Loire

Government
  - Mayor (2020–2026): Julien Barbeau
- Area^{1}: 27.46 km^{2} (10.60 sq mi)
- Elevation: 175 m (574 ft)
- Highest elevation: 215 m (705 ft)
- Lowest elevation: 152 m (499 ft)
- Population (2023): 317
  - Density: 11.5/km^{2} (29.9/sq mi)
- Time zone: UTC+01:00 (CET)
  - Summer (DST): UTC+02:00 (CEST)
- INSEE/Postal code: 18094 /18300
- ^{1} French Land Register data, which excludes lakes, ponds, glaciers > 1 km^{2} (0.386 sq mi or 247 acres) and river estuaries.

Feux (French pronunciation: [fø]) is a commune in the Cher department in the Centre-Val de Loire region of France.

== Geography ==
A farming area comprising the village and several hamlets situated by the banks of the Benelle river, some 25 miles (40 km) northeast of Bourges, at the junction of the D50, D52 and the D210 roads. The river Vauvise and its tributary, the Chantereine, form the eastern border of the commune.

== Population ==
Historical population
Year	Pop.	±% p.a.
1968	394	—
1975	367	−1.01%
1982	375	+0.31%
1990	393	+0.59%
1999	349	−1.31%
2007	343	−0.22%
2012	350	+0.40%
2017	343	−0.40%
2023	317	−1.31%
Source: INSEE

== Sights ==
- The church of St. Anne, dating from the nineteenth century.
- The fifteenth-century presbytery.
- A feudal motte at the Champ de l'Etang.
- Vestiges of a medieval castle, now incorporated in a farm, at Marnay.

== See also ==
- Communes of the Cher department
