= Béatrice Bulteau =

French equine artist

- Born: 1959; Sancerre, France
- Died: June 21, 2024 (aged 64–65)
- Known for: Painting, drawing, ceramics, graphic design, porcelain
- Notable work: Magical Horses (2003); Lusitano (2012); En Lusitanie (2014)
- Movement: Impressionism
- Awards: Equus Film Festival – Best Equestrian Art Film; 2014 'En Lusitanie'
- Website: beatricebulteau.com

Béatrice Bulteau (full name Béatrice Paule Jeanne Marie Bulteau) was an equine artist. She was born and grew up in Sancerre, Val de Loire, France, in 1959.

She began drawing horses at four years old, and later, on a trip to Ireland in 1976, delved into watercolours as a self-taught painter.

Her first art show was in Paris at 17 years old. She moved to Portugal in 1980, where she worked as an illustrator for the news at RTP (Rádio e Televisão de Portugal). At that same time, she began a series of studies of horses and movement.

From 1985 to 1995, she exhibited her work in 25 states of the USA, Japan, and Canada. Since then, her shows extended to South America, the Middle East, and most of Europe, which granted her worldwide recognition as a watercolourist and a specialist in impressionistic equine art.

In 1992, she began her work with ceramics and porcelain in Portugal, and also lithography in Paris, from which she would later transition to intaglio. In 1999, she extended her work to tapestry.

Two art books of her work have been published: Magical Horses, and Lusitano; both of which include poetry written by authors inspired by her work.

Since 2004, her work included digital hybrids, created from base drawings.

She delved into animation in 2010, through experiments with china ink drawings. Her short film En Lusitanie, featuring animated drawings and watercolours, was exhibited at the 2014 Equine Film Festival in New York City. It was her first contest submission, awarded with Best Artistic Film.

After an extended illness, Bulteau died on June 21, 2024.
