= Sancerre (wine) =

French wine from the Loire Valley

- Wine region
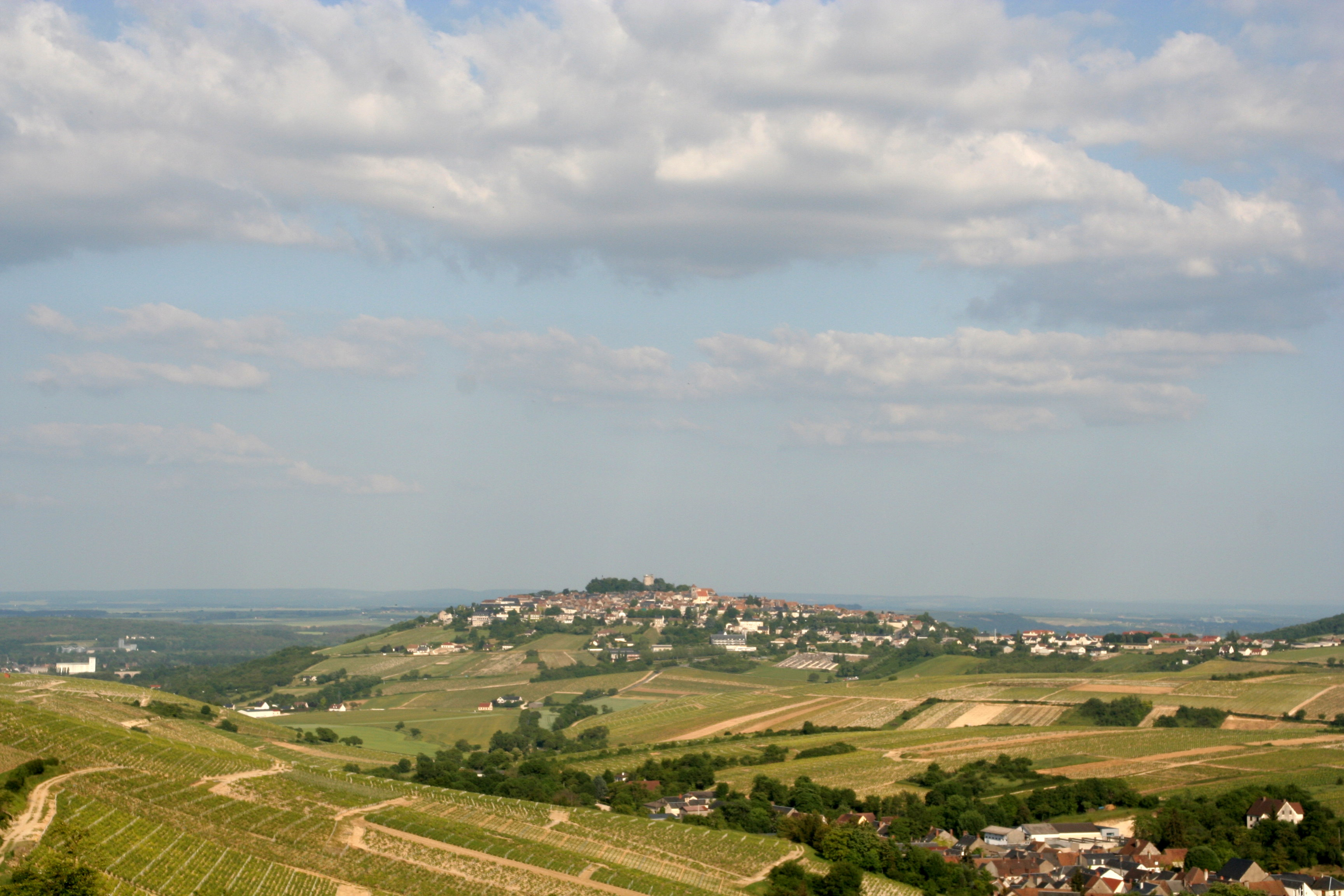
- Type: Appellation d'origine contrôlée
- Year established: 1936 (white), 1959 (red)
- Country: France
- Part of: Loire Valley
- Sub-regions: Ménétréol-sous-Sancerre, Chavignol, Bué
- Size of planted vineyards: 2,600 hectares (6,425 acres) (2006)
- Varietals produced: Sauvignon blanc, Pinot noir

Sancerre is a French wine Appellation d'origine contrôlée (AOC) for wine produced in the area of Sancerre in the eastern part of the Loire valley, southeast of Orléans.

Sancerre is highly regarded for white wine made from the Sauvignon blanc grape. However both Sancerre rouge and Sancerre rosé are made, representing approximately 20% and less than 1%, respectively, of Sancerre's total output. The basis for both the red and rosé is, as in nearby Burgundy and Champagne, the red grape Pinot noir.

White Sancerre was one of the original AOCs awarded in 1936, with the same area being designated for red wines on 23 January 1959. The AOC area has expanded fourfold over the years, most recently on 18 March 1998. The town of Sancerre lies on an outcrop of the chalk that runs from the White Cliffs of Dover down through the Champagne and Chablis. A series of small valleys cut through the chalk, each with their own soils and microclimate and terroir. In the east are the "flints" that make minerally, long-lived wines. Between the town and Verdigny the soil consists of marl and gravel – "les caillottes" – producing fruity, well balanced wines. And in the southwest, away from the river towards Menetou-Salon, the chalky "terres blanches" (white ground) produce weightier wines. Most – but not all – of the Sauvignon blancs are unoaked.

== History ==
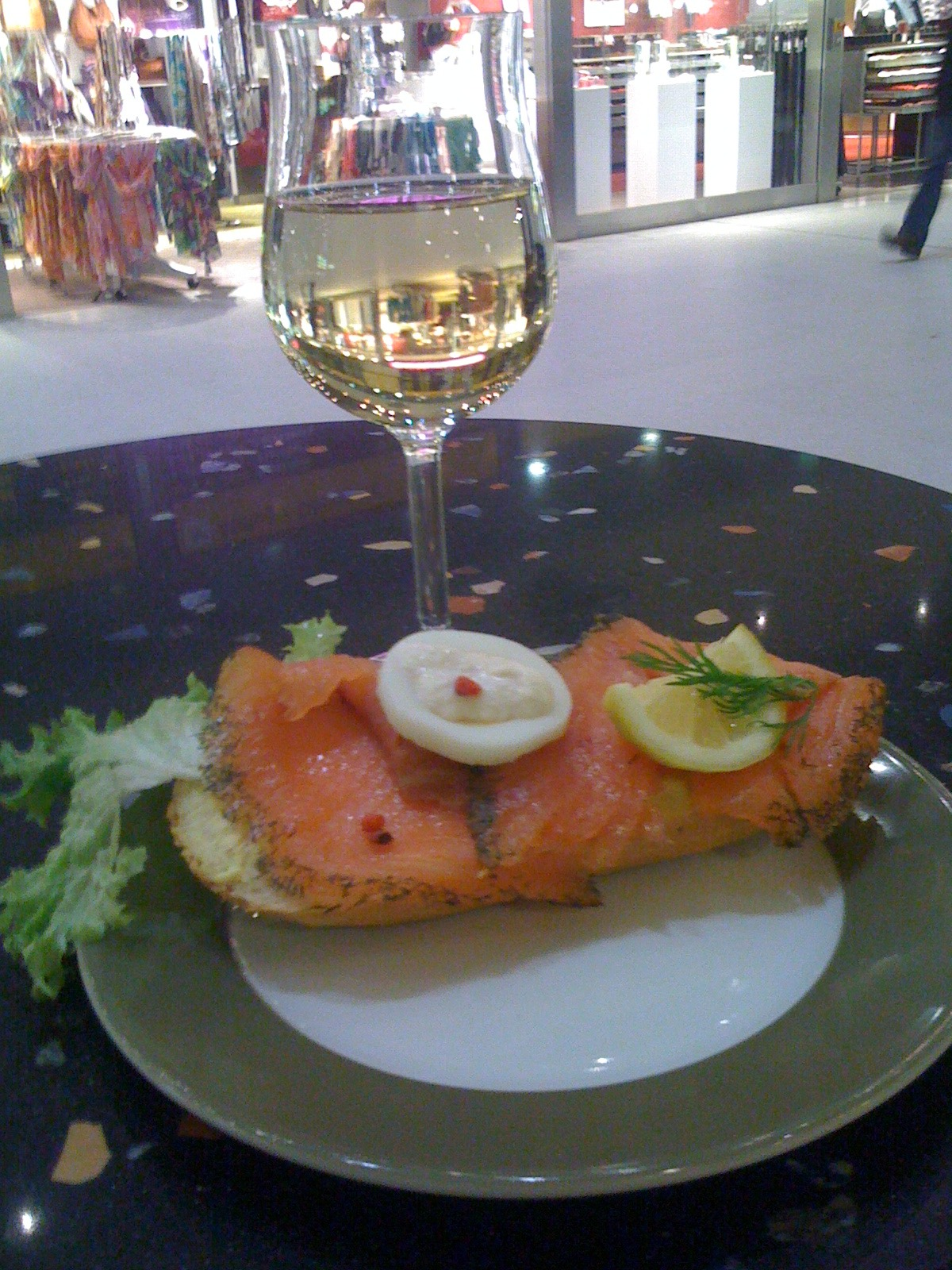
Sancerre's reputation for being a food friendly wine contributed to its popularity in the late 20th century as a popular wine on restaurant wine lists.

The area around Sancerre was likely first cultivated by the Romans, perhaps in the 1st century AD, though the exact date is unknown. The foundations of two separate Roman bridges across the Loire can be seen at the river village of St-Satur, the port for Sancerre, marking its ancient position along a major Roman route. The chalk hill outcrop was not only a distinctive landmark known in Roman times but it also fit the profile of terroir that was usually the first to be cultivated – it was near an important town and had easy access to a navigable river. Most importantly, however, the steep sloping hills could provide the grapes with enough direct sunlight and warmth to fully ripen while allowing cold air to flow off the slope and pool into the valleys below.

The region was historically linked to the Duchy of Burgundy, which may have played a role in the introduction of Pinot noir vines to this area. Sancerre's position as an administrative centre, and the large nearby cities of Orléans and Bourges (which was the capital of the powerful Duke of Berry) ensured healthy local markets for the Pinot Noir and Gamay wines traditional in the area. Demand further increased with the coming of the railway from Paris. In the late 19th century the phylloxera epidemic devastated the area wiping out the majority of the region's vines. While some Pinot noir vines were retained most of the Gamay was lost. They were replanted with Sauvignon Blanc, partly because it grafted better onto the American rootstocks. After World War II, the wines gained a reputation in the Paris bistro scene as an easy drinking white wine equivalent to Beaujolais. In the late 1970s and 1980s, a wave of quality consciousness helped elevate the reputation of Sancerre as an elegant and food friendly white wine that became a popular feature on restaurant lists across the globe.

== Climate and geography ==
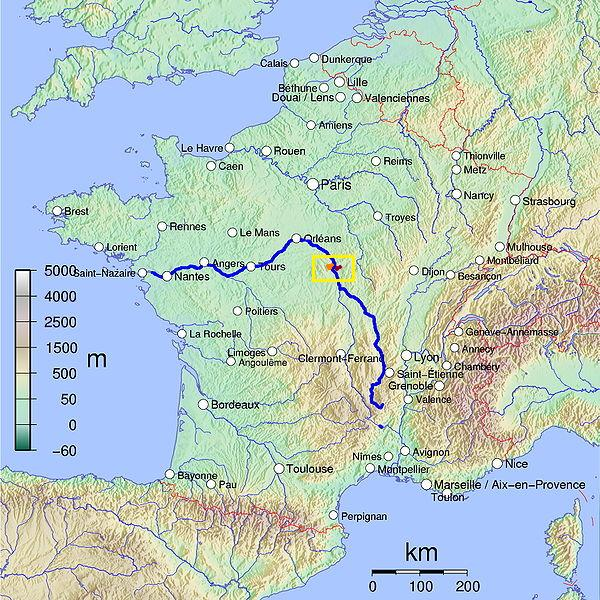
The distance between Sancerre (highlighted in pink within yellow box) and the Atlantic coast diminishes the maritime influence on the region and gives it more of a continental climate.

Sancerre is part of the "central vineyards" of the Loire Valley, so named not because they are in the center of the Loire but rather because they are nearly in the center of France. Together with neighboring Pouilly-Fumé, the region makes up the easternmost extension of the Loire Valley. The area is more than 300 miles (483 kilometers) from the Atlantic Coast and the Loire region of Muscadet, and is actually closer to the Champagne wine region than it is to the Middle Loire city of Tours and the Vouvray and Chinon AOCs. The distance from the Atlantic gives this region more of a continental climate than typical of the rest of the Loire with short, hot summers and long, cold winters that may extend the threat of frost damage into early spring.

The most dominating geographical influence of Sancerre is the nearby Loire river which flows northward past the city before it curves westward at Orleans and makes its path to the ocean. Located on the west bank of the river, Sancerre nearly faces the neighbouring wine region of Pouilly-Fumé on the east bank of the river just a few miles upstream towards the south. The region is located north of the city of Nevers and 22 miles (35 kilometers) northeast of Bourges, To the northeast, the Burgundian wine region of Chablis is only 60 miles (97 kilometers) away and shares the same out cropping of chalk soil that extends all the way to the White Cliffs of Dover in England.

Most vineyards planted on the hills around Sancerre are on south facing slopes at altitudes between 655 and 1,310 feet (200–400 meters). The soils around the area can be roughly classified into three categories. The far western reaches heading towards Menetou-Salon have "white" soils with clay and limestone. Around the village of Chavignol (considered a cru of Sancerre), the soil also includes some Kimmeridgian marl. Wines from these western reaches tend to have more body and power in their flavour profile. Heading closer to the city of Sancerre the soil picks up more gravel mixed with the limestone and tends to produce more light bodied wines with delicate aroma. The third classification of soil is found around the city of Sancerre itself which includes many deposits of flint (also known as silex) that add distinctive mineral components. These wines tend to be the most aromatic with the longest aging potential of Sancerres.

== Viticulture and winemaking ==
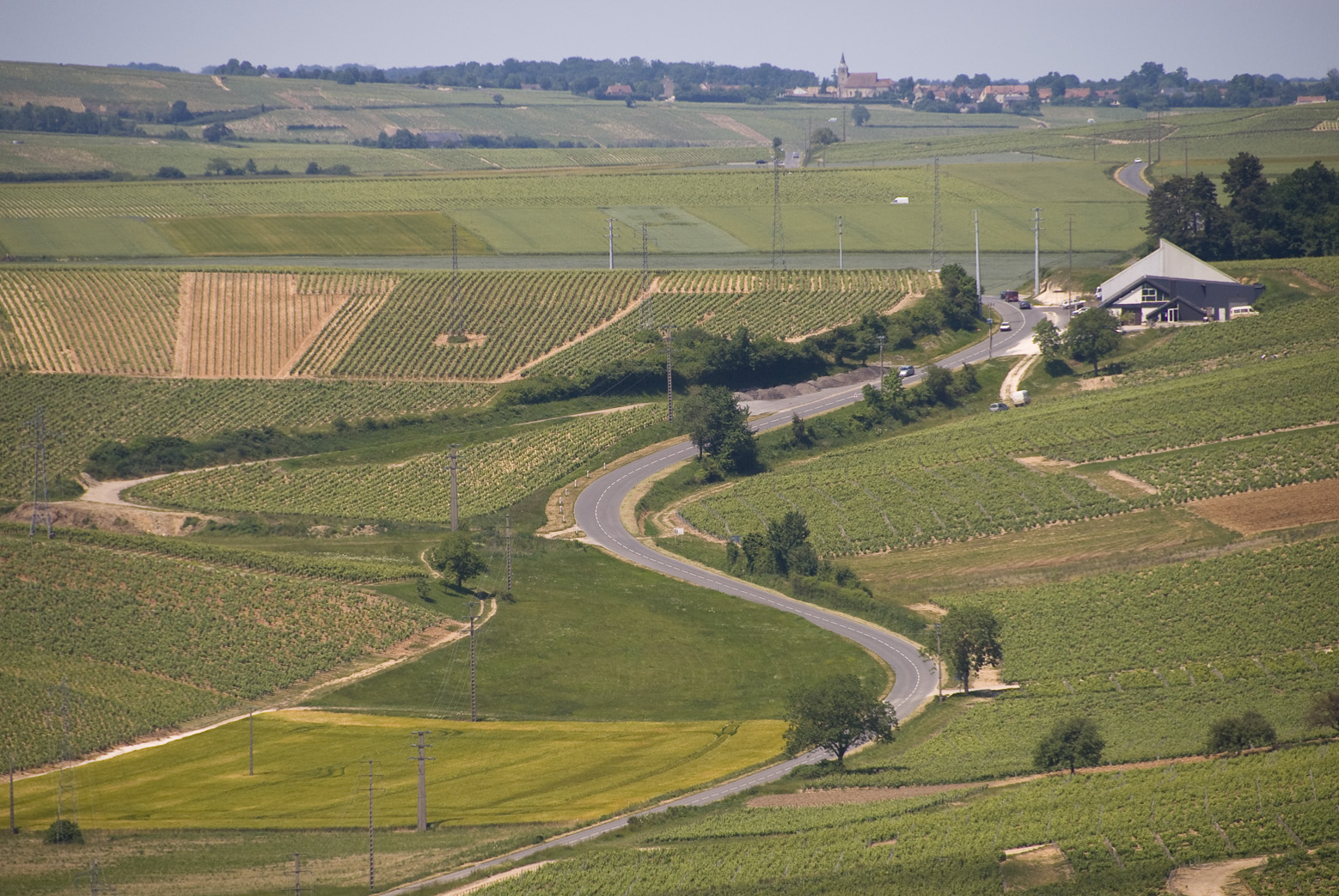
Sancerre includes both sloping vineyards and flatter terrain.

As a cool continental climate region, one of the main viticultural threats in Sancerre is springtime frost. Throughout most of the growing season, the nearby river Loire to the east and forest to the west help moderate temperatures. Vine growers in the area tend to utilize cordon or single Guyot vine training and tailor their canopy management techniques to whichever style of Sauvignon blanc they are looking to produce. Grassy, herbaceous styles of Sauvignon blanc are more prevalent with large, leafy canopies, while producers wishing to minimize these qualities may need wide, open canopies. In cooler vintages, the growers may need to take the additional measures of leaf plucking and de-budding in order to thin out the canopy and produce more concentrated grapes.

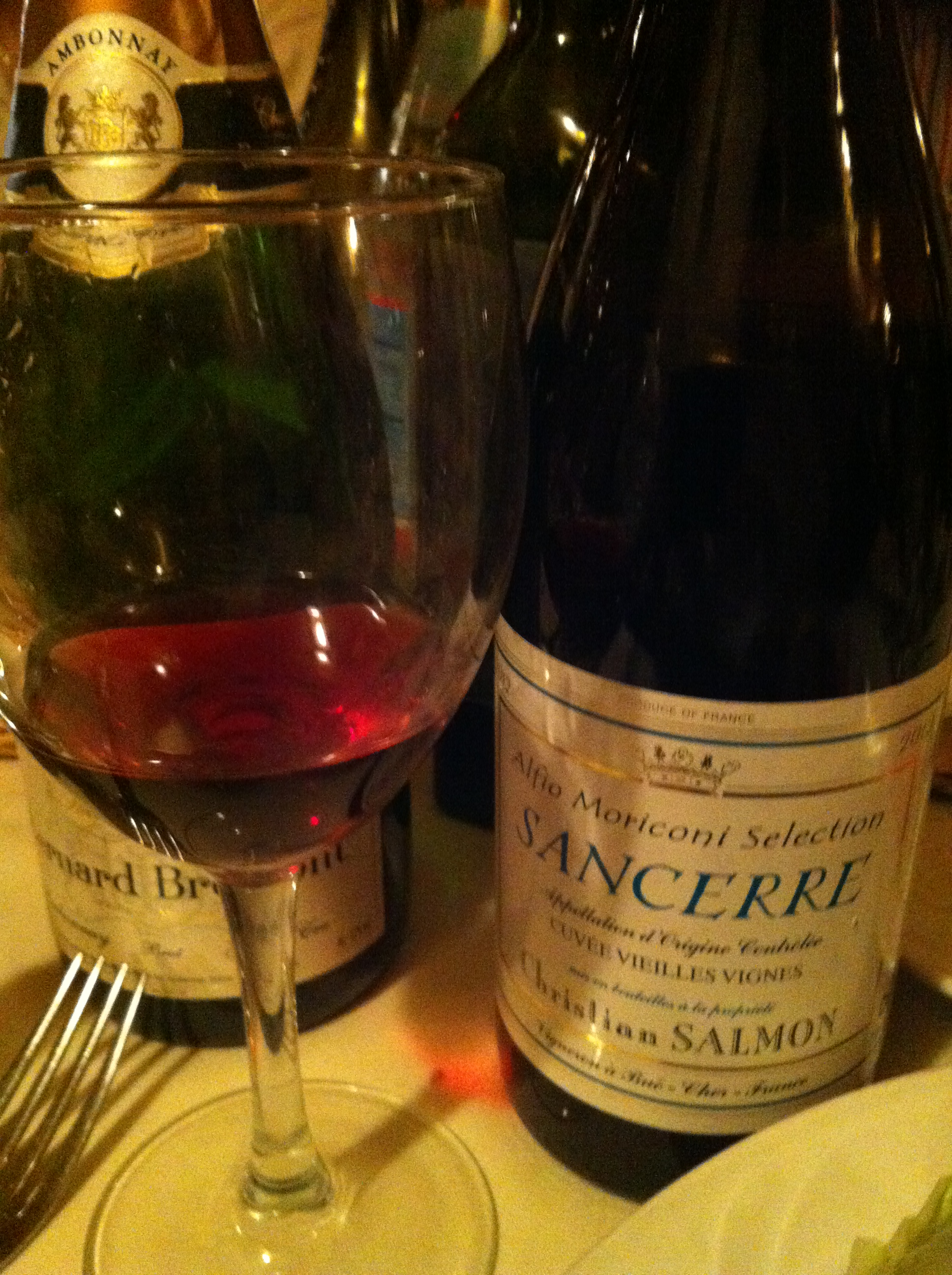
A Sancerre rouge made from Pinot noir.

The age of vine can also contribute to how much grassy character the resultant wine may have as well as how early the grapes are harvested. Many of the phenolic compounds and aroma compounds, such as pyrazine, that contribute to strong grassy flavours are found in the grape skins, eventually breaking down as it goes through its ripening process. Grapes that are harvested before they are physiologically ripe may have more overt grassy notes. How the harvest is conducted will depend on where the vineyards are located. As the steep slopes on which many Sancerre vineyards are planted make mechanical harvesting difficult, many vineyards are picked by hand. However, in the flatter vineyards located more towards the west of the appellation, mechanical harvesting is starting to become more prevalent.

The focus of Sancerre winemakers is usually to express the pure fruit flavours of Sauvignon blanc and the natural terroir of the region with very little adjustments taking place during winemaking. Most Sancerre is produced without malolactic fermentation and little oak influences. However, since the late 20th century more producers have begun experimenting with some degree of oak fermentation or aging. While most of the wines in this area are produced dry, in exceptionally warm and ripe years (such as 1989) some producers have made a late harvest wine. However, these are very rare.

== Wines ==
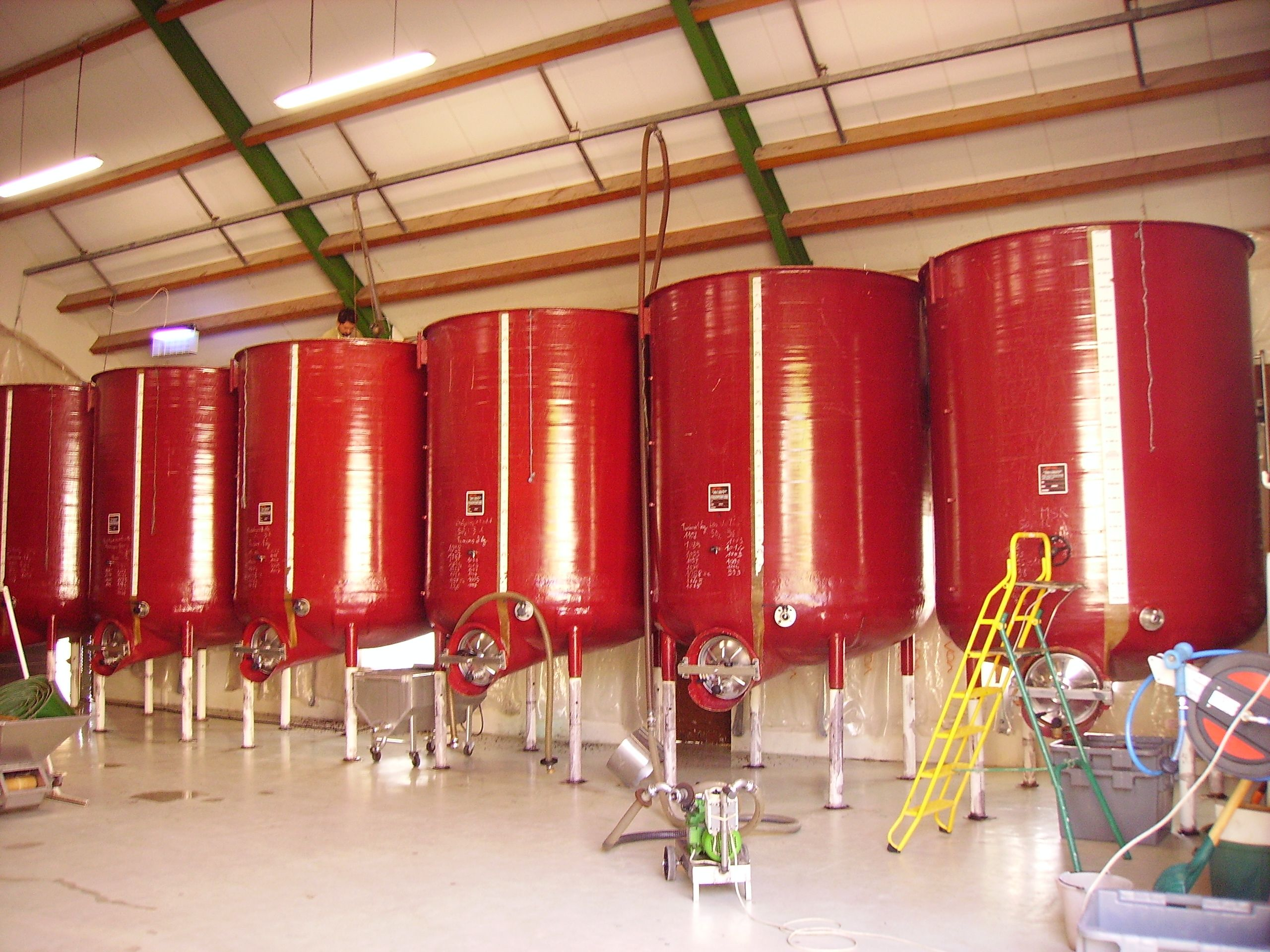
Sancerre wines often have very little interaction with oak, instead spending most of their fermentation and aging period in large stainless steel or fibreglass fermentation tanks, like this from a producer in the Sancerre village of Crézancy.

Wine expert Tom Stevenson describes the classic profile of Sancerre blanc as bone dry, highly aromatic with intense flavors of peaches and gooseberries. He describes Sancerre rouge as being light to medium bodied with floral aromas and delicate flavors. The Pinot noir based rosés are described as dry and light bodied with raspberry and strawberry notes. Other wine experts such as Jancis Robinson and Hugh Johnson note that in recent years overproduction has introduced a lot of variable quality with some Sancerre blancs producing flavor profiles that are not that much different from generic Sauvignon de Touraine from the Middle Loire, though this varies depending on the producer and overall quality of the vintage.

The styles of Sancerre will vary somewhat depending on what part of the wine region in which the grapes are produced. Around the village of Bué in the western reaches of the AOC, the soils tend to have more clay and produce more full bodied and rounded wines. The village of Chavignol, located to the northwest just outside Sancerre, has light soils that include a mix of limestone and gravel which produce more perfumed wines. Near Ménétréol-sous-Sancerre there is more flint deposits and the wines take on more mineral and steely notes. Within Sancerre the three villages of Bué, Chavignol and Ménétréol-sous-Sancerre (and sometimes Verdigny) have become so widely associated with distinctive and high quality wines that they are often referred to as "crus" even though Sancerre is not officially classified like parts of Bordeaux and Burgundy. Still, restaurants in Sancerre will often specify which wines on their wine list come from which of these three villages, while wine producers also try highlighting bottlings from these vineyards by including the village name on the wine label.

=== Comparisons to other Sauvignon blancs ===
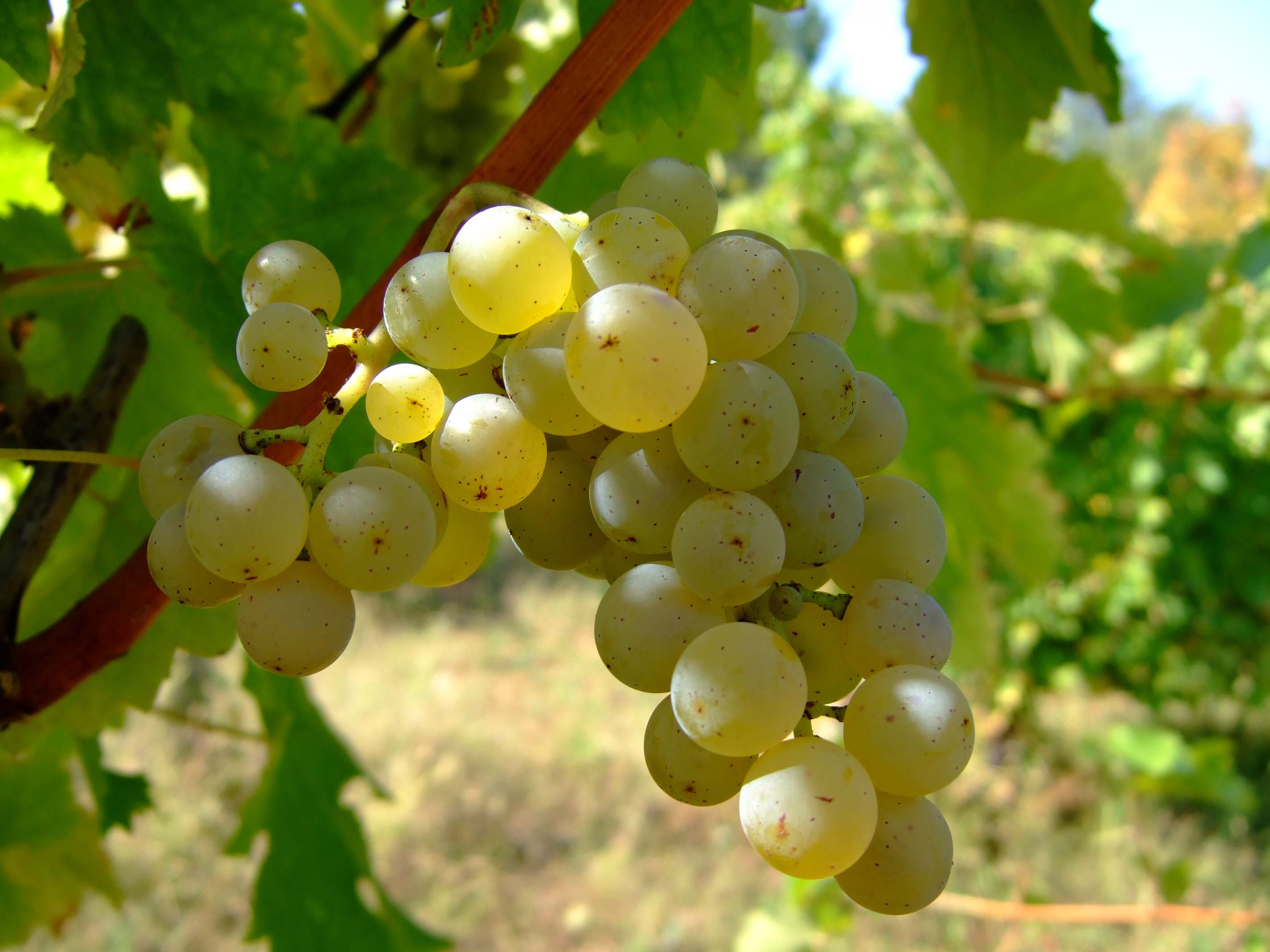
Sauvignon blanc grapes.

Sancerre is often compared to neighboring Pouilly-Fumé which also specializes in 100% Sauvignon blanc wines, and while there are some differences, wine experts like Robinson, Johnson and Karen MacNeil note that only very experienced tasters can distinguish the differences in a blind tasting. Broadly speaking, Sancerre tends to have a fuller body with more pronounced aromas, while Pouilly-Fumé wines are more perfumed. However, both wines have naturally high acidity and the potential to exhibit the minerally, flinty notes described as pierre à fusil or gunflint, as well as citrus and spicy notes.

Similarly Sancerre is compared to Sauvignon blancs produced around the globe. According to Master of wine Mary Ewing-Mulligan, Sancerre tends to be less herbaceous and grassy than Sauvignon blancs from New Zealand and the Alto-Adige and Friuli-Venezia Giulia region of Italy. Compared to Sauvignon blanc grown in Bordeaux, which are often blended with Semillon, Sancerre can be both more concentrated with more racy acidity. When contrasted with New World examples from California, Washington, Chile and South Africa, Sancerre tends to exhibit more assertive mineral flavours.

== Appellation details ==
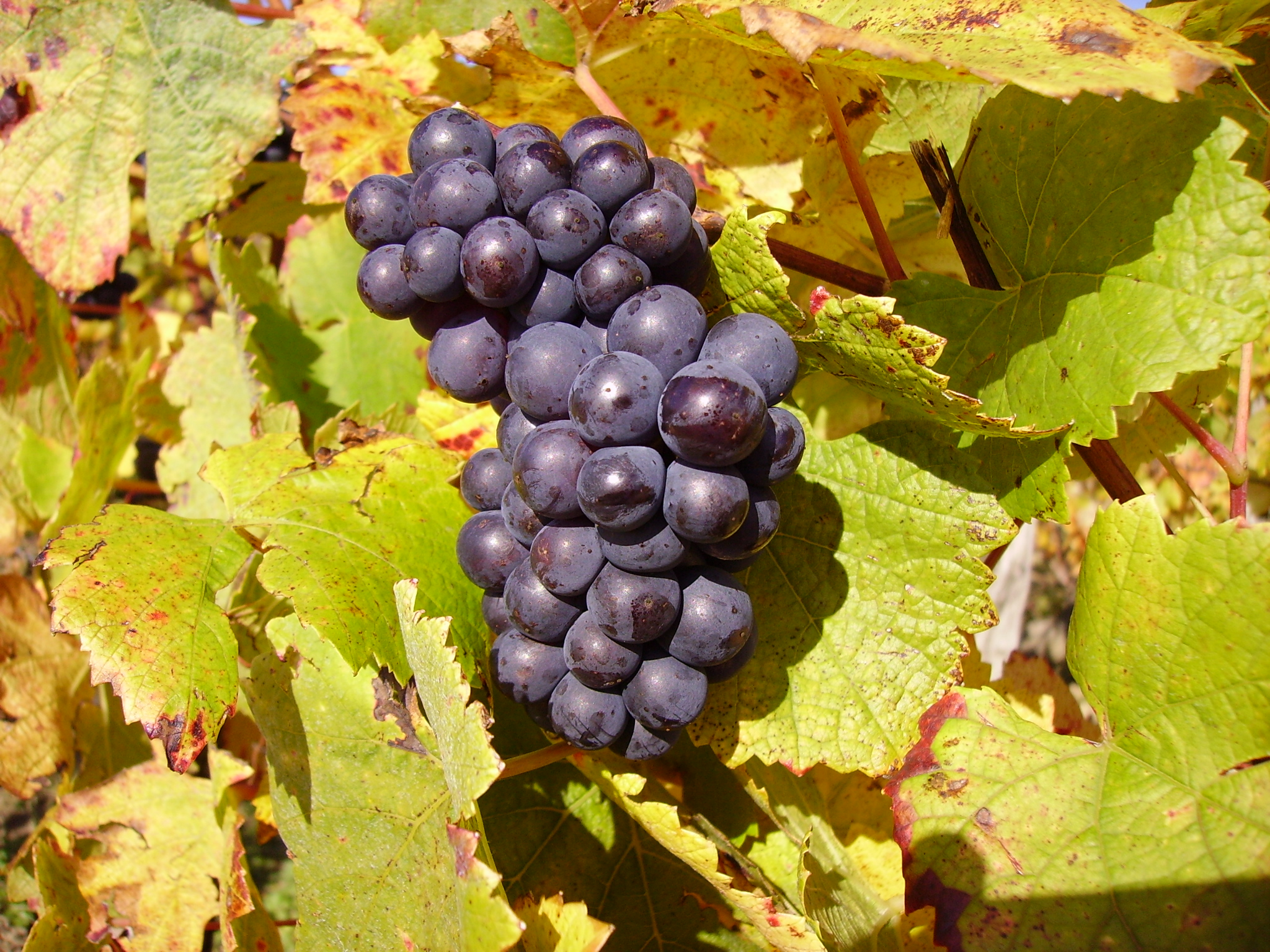
Pinot noir grapes growing near the village of Bué.

In 2006, the Sancerre AOC included 6,425 planted acres (2,600 ha). The AOC covers the communes of Bannay, Bué, Crézancy, Menetou-Râtel, Ménétréol, Montigny, Saint-Satur, Sainte-Gemme, Sancerre, Sury-en-Vaux, Thauvenay, Veaugues, Verdigny and Vinon. Within the appellation there are several highly regarded vineyards, such as the Clos de la Poussie, Chêne Marchand, and Le Grand Chemarin, but since the mid-1990s local regulations have prohibited producers from making vineyard designated wines in Sancerre. Some producers have attempted to get around this regulation by abbreviating the name of the vineyard as part of a cuvée designation such as Jean-Max Roger's bottling of Sancerre Cuvée GC from the Le Grand Chemarin vineyard.

According to AOC regulations, only Sauvignon blanc and Pinot noir are permitted as AOC classified Sancerre wine. While Sauvignon blanc represents the vast majority of the area's production, Pinot noir can account for anywhere from one-fifth to one-sixth of annual production depending on the vintage. The yields of Sancerre blanc are limited to a maximum of 60 hectoliters per hectare while Sancerre rouge and rose are restricted to maximum yields of 55 hl/ha. The minimum alcohol content of Sancerre blanc is 10.5% alcohol per volume while Sancerre rouge and rosé must maintain a minimum alcohol level of 10%. Wines made outside these AOC regulations must be declassified from AOC wines to vin de pays table wine such as Vin de Pays du Jardin de France.
