= Gardefort =

- Commune
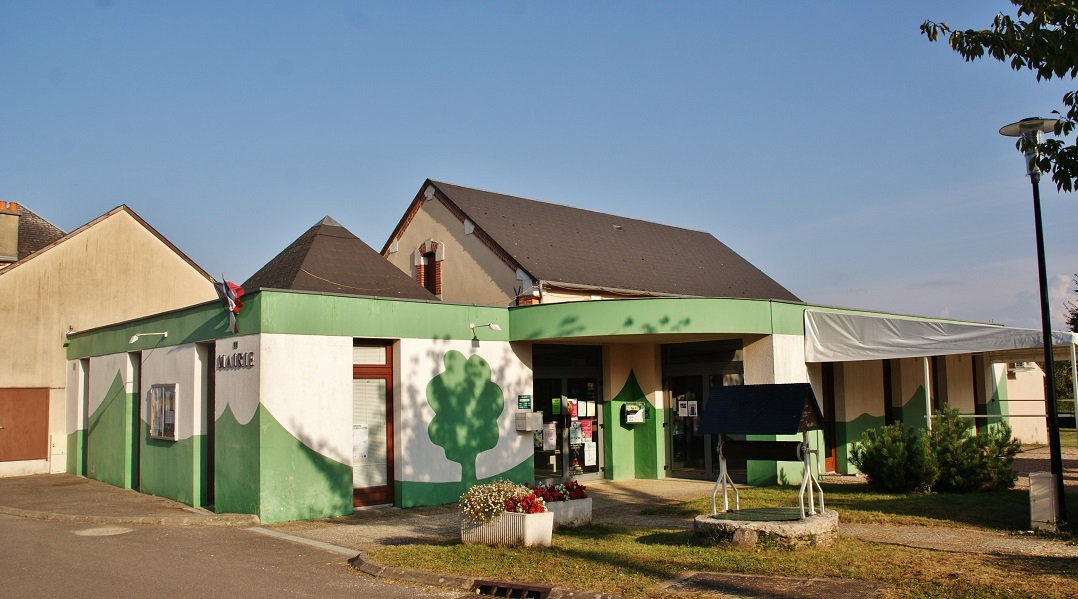
- The town hall in Gardefort

- Coat of arms
- Location of Gardefort
- Location within France Location within Centre-Val de Loire
- Coordinates: 47°16′11″N 2°49′48″E
- Country: France
- Region: Centre-Val de Loire
- Department: Cher
- Arrondissement: Bourges
- Canton: Sancerre
- Intercommunality: CC Pays Fort Sancerrois Val de Loire

Government
  - Mayor (2020–2026): Claude Fontaine
- Area^{1}: 8.44 km^{2} (3.26 sq mi)
- Elevation: 206 m (676 ft)
- Highest elevation: 236 m (774 ft)
- Lowest elevation: 175 m (574 ft)
- Population (2023): 127
  - Density: 15.0/km^{2} (39.0/sq mi)
- Time zone: UTC+01:00 (CET)
  - Summer (DST): UTC+02:00 (CEST)
- INSEE/Postal code: 18098 /18300
- ^{1} French Land Register data, which excludes lakes, ponds, glaciers > 1 km^{2} (0.386 sq mi or 247 acres) and river estuaries.

Gardefort (French pronunciation: [ɡaʁdəfɔʁ]) is a commune in the Cher department in the Centre-Val de Loire region of France.

== Geography ==
A farming area comprising a small village and a hamlet situated some 25 miles (40 km) northeast of Bourges, at the junction of the D50, D172 and the D10 roads.

== Population ==
Historical population
| Year | Pop. | ±% p.a. |
|---|---|---|
| 1968 | 132 | — |
| 1975 | 117 | −1.71% |
| 1982 | 112 | −0.62% |
| 1990 | 128 | +1.68% |
| 1999 | 107 | −1.97% |
| 2007 | 120 | +1.44% |
| 2012 | 143 | +3.57% |
| 2017 | 142 | −0.14% |
| 2023 | 127 | −1.84% |
Source: INSEE

== Sights ==
- The church of St. Martin, dating from the nineteenth century.
- Vestiges of a medieval fortification, the "Vieux Château".
- Another old château.

== See also ==
- Communes of the Cher department
