= Couargues =

- Commune
- Location of Couargues
- Location within France Location within Centre-Val de Loire
- Coordinates: 47°16′41″N 2°55′47″E
- Country: France
- Region: Centre-Val de Loire
- Department: Cher
- Arrondissement: Bourges
- Canton: Sancerre
- Intercommunality: CC Pays Fort Sancerrois Val de Loire

Government
  - Mayor (2020–2026): Jacqueline Boulay
- Area^{1}: 11.62 km^{2} (4.49 sq mi)
- Elevation: 178 m (584 ft)
- Highest elevation: 155 m (509 ft)
- Lowest elevation: 141 m (463 ft)
- Population (2023): 194
  - Density: 16.7/km^{2} (43.2/sq mi)
- Time zone: UTC+01:00 (CET)
  - Summer (DST): UTC+02:00 (CEST)
- INSEE/Postal code: 18074 /18300
- ^{1} French Land Register data, which excludes lakes, ponds, glaciers > 1 km^{2} (0.386 sq mi or 247 acres) and river estuaries.

Couargues (French pronunciation: [kwaʁɡ]) is a commune in the Cher department in the Centre-Val de Loire region of France.

== Geography ==
A farming area comprising five hamlets situated between the banks of the Loire and the canal parallel to the Loire, some 30 miles (48 km) northeast of Bourges at the junction of the D59 with the D206 and D259 roads.

== Population ==
Historical population
Year	Pop.	±% p.a.
1968	238	—
1975	224	−0.86%
1982	211	−0.85%
1990	207	−0.24%
1999	228	+1.08%
2007	218	−0.56%
2012	197	−2.01%
2017	205	+0.80%
2023	194	−0.91%
Source: INSEE

== Sights ==
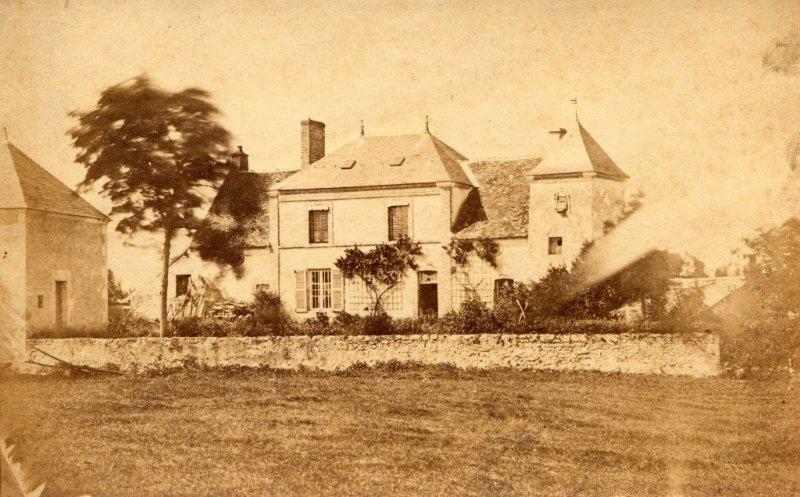
The presbytery

- The presbytery of St. Aignan, dating from the fifteenth century.
- Two watermills.

== See also ==
- Communes of the Cher department
