= Communauté de communes Pays Fort Sancerrois Val de Loire =

Federation of municipalities in France

Pays Fort Sancerrois Val de Loire
- Communauté de communes
- Interactive map of Pays Fort Sancerrois Val de Loire
- Coordinates: 47°20′N 02°50′E
- Country: France
- Region: Centre-Val de Loire
- Department: Cher
- No. of communes: {{{nbcomm}}}
- Established: 2017
- Area: 688.0 km^{2} (265.6 sq mi)
- Population (2018): 18,476
  - Density: 26.85/km^{2} (69.55/sq mi)
- Website: www.comcompsv.fr

The Communauté de communes Pays Fort Sancerrois Val de Loire is a communauté de communes, an intercommunal structure, in the Cher department, in the Centre-Val de Loire region, central France. It was created in January 2017 by the merger of the former communautés de communes Cœur du Pays Fort, Haut-Berry - Val de Loire and Sancerrois. Its area is 688.0 km^{2}, and its population was 18,476 in 2018. Its seat is in Sancerre.

== Communes ==
The communauté de communes consists of the following 36 communes:

1. Assigny
2. Bannay
3. Barlieu
4. Belleville-sur-Loire
5. Boulleret
6. Bué
7. Concressault
8. Couargues
9. Crézancy-en-Sancerre
10. Dampierre-en-Crot
11. Feux
12. Gardefort
13. Jalognes
14. Jars
15. Léré
16. Menetou-Râtel
17. Ménétréol-sous-Sancerre
18. Le Noyer
19. Saint-Bouize
20. Sainte-Gemme-en-Sancerrois
21. Saint-Satur
22. Sancerre
23. Santranges
24. Savigny-en-Sancerre
25. Sens-Beaujeu
26. Subligny
27. Sury-en-Vaux
28. Sury-ès-Bois
29. Sury-près-Léré
30. Thauvenay
31. Thou
32. Vailly-sur-Sauldre
33. Veaugues
34. Verdigny
35. Villegenon
36. Vinon
