= Sury-près-Léré =

- Commune
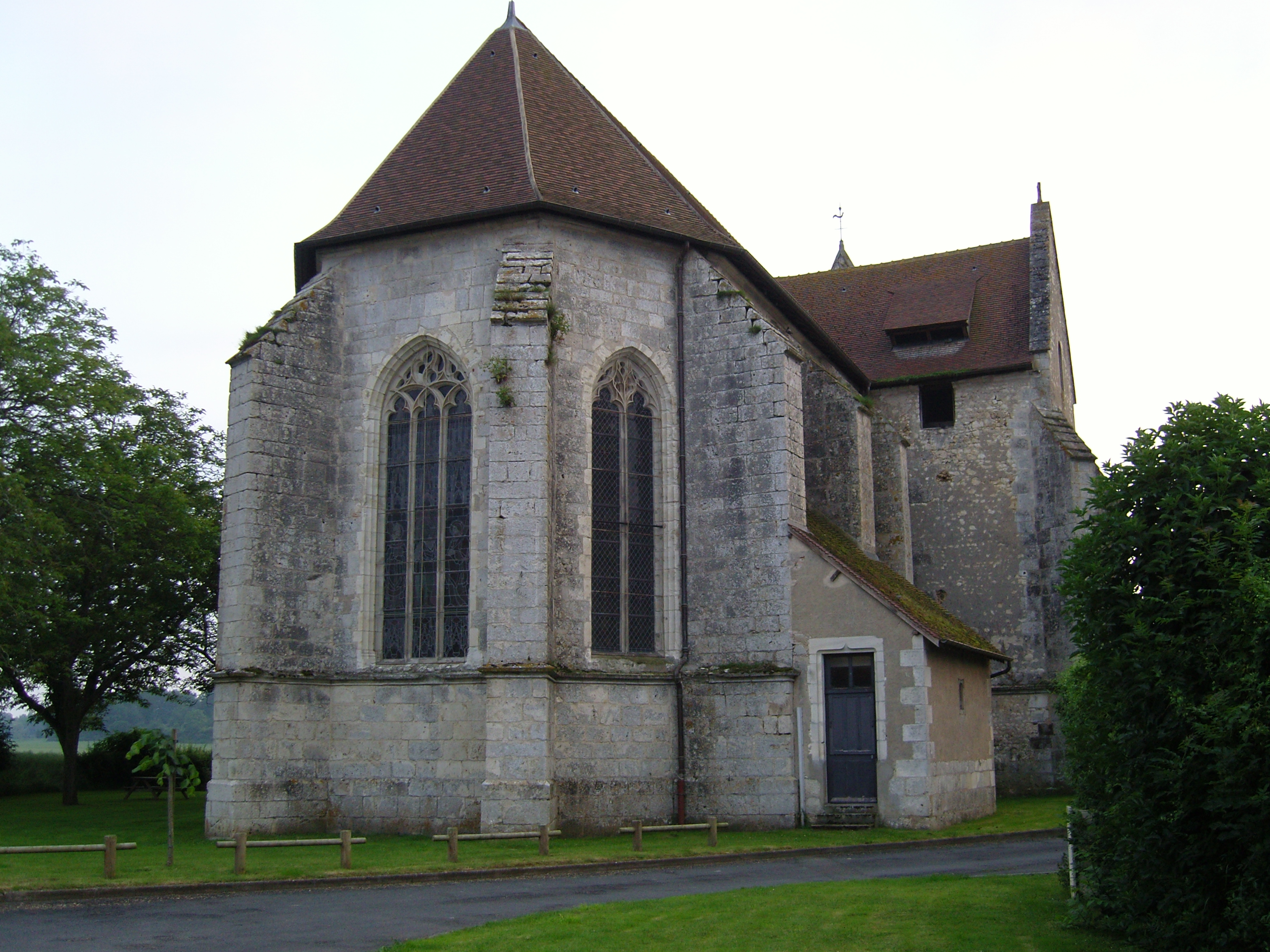
- The church in Sury-près-Léré

- Coat of arms
- Location of Sury-près-Léré
- Location within France Location within Centre-Val de Loire
- Coordinates: 47°29′02″N 2°52′05″E
- Country: France
- Region: Centre-Val de Loire
- Department: Cher
- Arrondissement: Bourges
- Canton: Sancerre
- Intercommunality: CC Pays Fort Sancerrois Val de Loire

Government
  - Mayor (2022–2026): Jean-Francois Castellano
- Area^{1}: 17.78 km^{2} (6.86 sq mi)
- Highest elevation: 238 m (781 ft)
- Lowest elevation: 132 m (433 ft)
- Population (2023): 649
  - Density: 36.5/km^{2} (94.5/sq mi)
- Time zone: UTC+01:00 (CET)
  - Summer (DST): UTC+02:00 (CEST)
- INSEE/Postal code: 18257 /18240
- ^{1} French Land Register data, which excludes lakes, ponds, glaciers > 1 km^{2} (0.386 sq mi or 247 acres) and river estuaries.

Sury-près-Léré (French pronunciation: [syʁi pʁɛ leʁe], literally Sury near Léré) is a commune in the Cher department in the Centre-Val de Loire region of France.

== Geography ==
A farming area comprising the village and several hamlets situated by the banks of the Loire lateral canal about 36 miles (58 km) northeast of Bourges at the junction of the D152 and the D751 roads. The river Loire forms the eastern boundary of the commune.

== Population ==
Historical population
Year	Pop.	±% p.a.
1968	331	—
1975	322	−0.39%
1982	378	+2.32%
1990	481	+3.06%
1999	509	+0.63%
2007	555	+1.09%
2012	543	−0.44%
2017	711	+5.54%
2023	649	−1.51%
Source: INSEE

== Sights ==
- The church of St.Jean-Baptiste, dating from the sixteenth century
- Two feudal mottes
- A watermill

== See also ==
- Communes of the Cher department
