= Veaugues =

- Commune
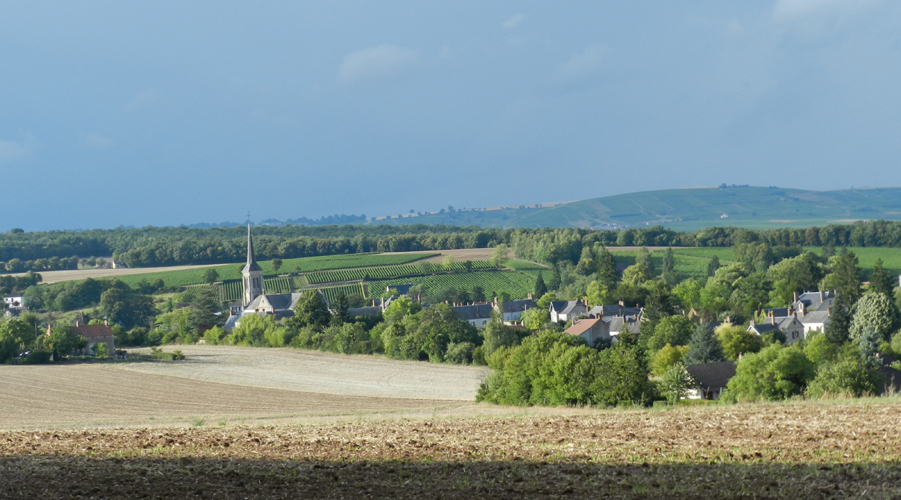
- A general view of Veaugues
- Location of Veaugues
- Location within France Location within Centre-Val de Loire
- Coordinates: 47°15′29″N 2°45′31″E
- Country: France
- Region: Centre-Val de Loire
- Department: Cher
- Arrondissement: Bourges
- Canton: Sancerre
- Intercommunality: CC Pays Fort Sancerrois Val de Loire

Government
  - Mayor (2020–2026): Jean-Yves Pelé
- Area^{1}: 27.92 km^{2} (10.78 sq mi)
- Highest elevation: 346 m (1,135 ft)
- Lowest elevation: 180 m (590 ft)
- Population (2023): 593
  - Density: 21.2/km^{2} (55.0/sq mi)
- Time zone: UTC+01:00 (CET)
  - Summer (DST): UTC+02:00 (CEST)
- INSEE/Postal code: 18272 /18300
- ^{1} French Land Register data, which excludes lakes, ponds, glaciers > 1 km^{2} (0.386 sq mi or 247 acres) and river estuaries.

Veaugues (French pronunciation: [voɡ]) is a commune in the Cher department in the Centre-Val de Loire region of France.

== Geography ==
An area of winegrowing, forestry and farming comprising the village and a couple of hamlets situated on the banks of the small Planche-Goddard river, about 24 miles (39 km) northeast of Bourges at the junction of the D86 with the D49, D59 and D955 roads. The commune is one of 14 that grow grapes for the production of Sancerre AOC wine.

== Population ==
Historical population
Year	Pop.	±% p.a.
1968	610	—
1975	631	+0.48%
1982	603	−0.65%
1990	564	−0.83%
1999	610	+0.87%
2007	660	+0.99%
2012	681	+0.63%
2017	633	−1.45%
2023	593	−1.08%
Source: INSEE

== Sights ==
- The church of St. Aignan, dating from the twelfth century.
- The feudal motte.
- A watermill.

== See also ==
- Communes of the Cher department
