= Cantons of Bourges =

Coordinates: 47°5′4″N 2°23′47″E

The Cantons of Bourges City are 4 cantons situated in the Cher département and in the Centre-Val de Loire region of France. Each canton covers a part of the commune of Bourges.

== Population ==
Name	Population (2019)	Cantonal Code
Canton of Bourges-1	17,838	1803
Canton of Bourges-2	15,206	1804
Canton of Bourges-3	14,442	1805
Canton of Bourges-4	17,055	1806

== See also ==
- Arrondissements of the Cher department
- Communes of the Cher department
