= Vinon =

- Commune
- Coat of arms
- Location of Vinon
- Location within France Location within Centre-Val de Loire
- Coordinates: 47°17′10″N 2°49′37″E
- Country: France
- Region: Centre-Val de Loire
- Department: Cher
- Arrondissement: Bourges
- Canton: Sancerre
- Intercommunality: CC Pays Fort Sancerrois Val de Loire

Government
  - Mayor (2020–2026): Marie-France Marix
- Area^{1}: 18.01 km^{2} (6.95 sq mi)
- Highest elevation: 326 m (1,070 ft)
- Lowest elevation: 158 m (518 ft)
- Population (2023): 302
  - Density: 16.8/km^{2} (43.4/sq mi)
- Time zone: UTC+01:00 (CET)
  - Summer (DST): UTC+02:00 (CEST)
- INSEE/Postal code: 18287 /18300
- ^{1} French Land Register data, which excludes lakes, ponds, glaciers > 1 km^{2} (0.386 sq mi or 247 acres) and river estuaries.

Vinon (French pronunciation: [vinɔ̃]) is a commune in the Cher department in the Centre-Val de Loire region of France.

== Geography ==
An area of winegrowing and farming comprising the village and several hamlets situated in the valley of the Planche-Godard river, about 25 miles (40 km) northeast of Bourges, at the junction of the D10 with the D85 and D59 roads. One of fourteen communes whose grapes go to produce Sancerre AOC wine.

== Population ==
Historical population
Year	Pop.	±% p.a.
1968	269	—
1975	260	−0.48%
1982	271	+0.59%
1990	313	+1.82%
1999	280	−1.23%
2007	267	−0.59%
2012	290	+1.67%
2017	297	+0.48%
2023	302	+0.28%
Source: INSEE

== Sights ==
- A church, dating from the fifteenth century.
- The sixteenth-century chateau of Vaufreland.
- A medieval washhouse.

== See also ==
- Communes of the Cher department
