= Savigny-en-Sancerre =

- Commune
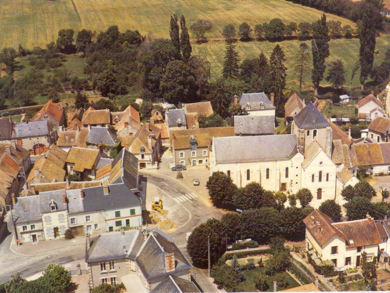
- An aerial view of the church, the town hall and the main shops

- Coat of arms
- Location of Savigny-en-Sancerre
- Location within France Location within Centre-Val de Loire
- Coordinates: 47°26′31″N 2°48′36″E
- Country: France
- Region: Centre-Val de Loire
- Department: Cher
- Arrondissement: Bourges
- Canton: Sancerre
- Intercommunality: CC Pays Fort Sancerrois Val de Loire

Government
  - Mayor (2020–2026): Thérèse Ruelle
- Area^{1}: 33.31 km^{2} (12.86 sq mi)
- Elevation: 226 m (741 ft)
- Highest elevation: 298 m (978 ft)
- Lowest elevation: 176 m (577 ft)
- Population (2023): 1,088
  - Density: 32.66/km^{2} (84.60/sq mi)
- Time zone: UTC+01:00 (CET)
  - Summer (DST): UTC+02:00 (CEST)
- INSEE/Postal code: 18246 /18240
- ^{1} French Land Register data, which excludes lakes, ponds, glaciers > 1 km^{2} (0.386 sq mi or 247 acres) and river estuaries.

Savigny-en-Sancerre (French pronunciation: [saviɲi ɑ̃ sɑ̃sɛʁ]) is a commune in the Cher department in the Centre-Val de Loire region of France.

== Geography ==
A farming area comprising a village and several hamlets situated about 31 miles (50 km) northeast of Bourges, at the junction of the D13 with the D54, D47 and the D152 roads. The commune is the source of many small rivers.

== Population ==
Historical population
Year	Pop.	±% p.a.
1968	895	—
1975	855	−0.65%
1982	891	+0.59%
1990	981	+1.21%
1999	1,023	+0.47%
2007	1,078	+0.66%
2012	1,053	−0.47%
2017	1,030	−0.44%
2023	1,088	+0.92%
Source: INSEE

== Sights ==
- The church of St. Symphorien, dating from the twelfth century.
- The fifteenth-century chapel in the cemetery.

== See also ==
- Communes of the Cher department
