= Verdigny =

- Commune
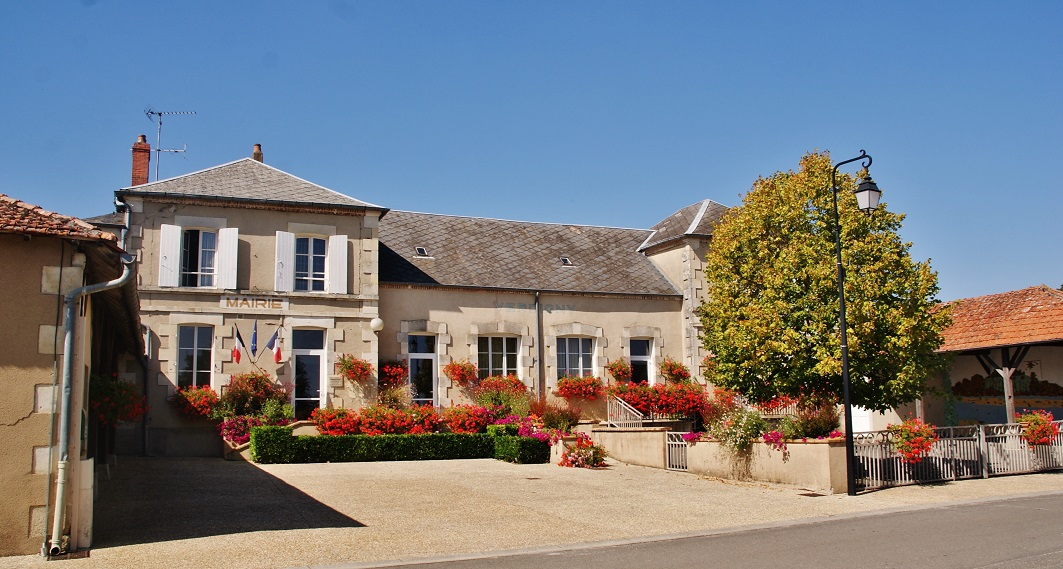
- Town hall
- Location of Verdigny
- Location within France Location within Centre-Val de Loire
- Coordinates: 47°20′52″N 2°48′32″E
- Country: France
- Region: Centre-Val de Loire
- Department: Cher
- Arrondissement: Bourges
- Canton: Sancerre
- Intercommunality: CC Pays Fort Sancerrois Val de Loire

Government
  - Mayor (2020–2026): Olivier Gaucheron
- Area^{1}: 4.99 km^{2} (1.93 sq mi)
- Elevation: 250 m (820 ft)
- Highest elevation: 342 m (1,122 ft)
- Lowest elevation: 181 m (594 ft)
- Population (2023): 313
  - Density: 62.7/km^{2} (162/sq mi)
- Time zone: UTC+01:00 (CET)
  - Summer (DST): UTC+02:00 (CEST)
- INSEE/Postal code: 18274 /18300
- ^{1} French Land Register data, which excludes lakes, ponds, glaciers > 1 km^{2} (0.386 sq mi or 247 acres) and river estuaries.

Verdigny (French pronunciation: [vɛʁdiɲi]) is a commune in the Cher department in the Centre-Val de Loire region of France.

== Geography ==
An area of winegrowing and farming comprising two villages and a couple of hamlets situated about 26 miles (42 km) northeast of Bourges at the junction of the D134 with the D134e road. The commune is one of 14 that grow grapes for the production of Sancerre AOC wine.

== Population ==
Historical population
Year	Pop.	±% p.a.
1968	323	—
1975	310	−0.59%
1982	303	−0.33%
1990	299	−0.17%
1999	271	−1.09%
2007	280	+0.41%
2012	302	+1.52%
2017	309	+0.46%
2023	313	+0.21%
Source: INSEE

== Sights ==
- The church dating from the nineteenth century.
- A watermill.

== See also ==
- Communes of the Cher department
