= Menetou-Râtel =

- Commune
- Location of Menetou-Râtel
- Location within France Location within Centre-Val de Loire
- Coordinates: 47°21′07″N 2°45′24″E
- Country: France
- Region: Centre-Val de Loire
- Department: Cher
- Arrondissement: Bourges
- Canton: Sancerre
- Intercommunality: CC Pays Fort Sancerrois Val de Loire

Government
  - Mayor (2022–2026): Corine Lelievre
- Area^{1}: 28.01 km^{2} (10.81 sq mi)
- Elevation: 311 m (1,020 ft)
- Highest elevation: 377 m (1,237 ft)
- Lowest elevation: 242 m (794 ft)
- Population (2023): 456
  - Density: 16.3/km^{2} (42.2/sq mi)
- Time zone: UTC+01:00 (CET)
  - Summer (DST): UTC+02:00 (CEST)
- INSEE/Postal code: 18144 /18300
- ^{1} French Land Register data, which excludes lakes, ponds, glaciers > 1 km^{2} (0.386 sq mi or 247 acres) and river estuaries.

Menetou-Râtel (French pronunciation: [mɛntu ʁatɛl]) is a commune in the Cher department in the Centre-Val de Loire region of France.

== Geography ==
A winegrowing and farming area comprising the village and several hamlets situated some 26 miles (42 km) northeast of Bourges, at the junction of the D85, D86 and the D923 roads. The commune is one of only a few that can grow grapes for Sancerre AOC wine.

== Population ==
Historical population
Year	Pop.	±% p.a.
1968	594	—
1975	526	−1.72%
1982	506	−0.55%
1990	483	−0.58%
1999	480	−0.07%
2007	489	+0.23%
2012	483	−0.25%
2017	484	+0.04%
2023	456	−0.99%
Source: INSEE

== Sights ==
- The church of St. Martin, dating from the twelfth century.
- The fourteenth-century priory of Notre-Dame.
- The chateau of Couet built in 1875.
- A watermill.

== See also ==
- Communes of the Cher department
