= Sury-en-Vaux =

- Commune
- Location of Sury-en-Vaux
- Location within France Location within Centre-Val de Loire
- Coordinates: 47°22′07″N 2°48′19″E
- Country: France
- Region: Centre-Val de Loire
- Department: Cher
- Arrondissement: Bourges
- Canton: Sancerre
- Intercommunality: CC Pays Fort Sancerrois Val de Loire

Government
  - Mayor (2020–2026): Valérie Chambon
- Area^{1}: 15.82 km^{2} (6.11 sq mi)
- Elevation: 180 m (590 ft)
- Highest elevation: 326 m (1,070 ft)
- Lowest elevation: 183 m (600 ft)
- Population (2023): 680
  - Density: 43/km^{2} (110/sq mi)
- Time zone: UTC+01:00 (CET)
  - Summer (DST): UTC+02:00 (CEST)
- INSEE/Postal code: 18258 /18300
- ^{1} French Land Register data, which excludes lakes, ponds, glaciers > 1 km^{2} (0.386 sq mi or 247 acres) and river estuaries.

Sury-en-Vaux (French pronunciation: [syʁi ɑ̃ vo]) is a commune in the Cher department in the Centre-Val de Loire region of France.

== Geography ==
An area of vineyards and farming comprising the village and several hamlets situated in the valley of the river Belaine, about 26 miles (42 km) northeast of Bourges, at the junction of the D86 with the D57 and D54 roads. It is one of the communes permitted to grow grapes for Sancerre AOC wine.

== Population ==
Historical population
Year	Pop.	±% p.a.
1968	714	—
1975	665	−1.01%
1982	673	+0.17%
1990	686	+0.24%
1999	721	+0.55%
2007	721	+0.00%
2012	712	−0.25%
2017	703	−0.25%
2023	680	−0.55%
Source: INSEE

== Sights ==
- The church of St. Etienne, dating from the nineteenth century.

== Personalities ==
The English poet, author and biographer Richard Aldington lived in Sury-en-Vaux from 1958 until his death in 1962. He is buried in the local cemetery.

== See also ==
- Communes of the Cher department
