= Subligny, Cher =

Subligny
- Commune
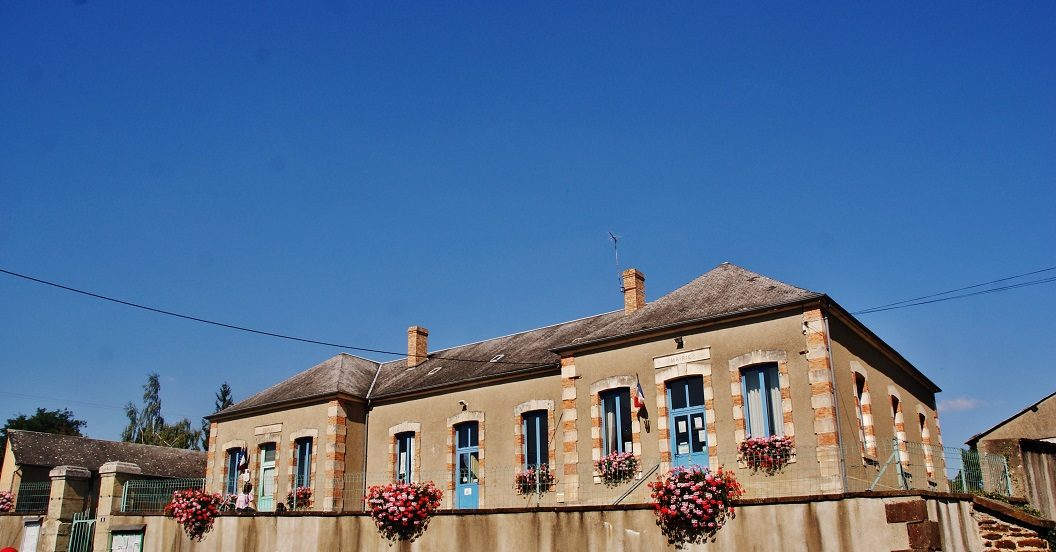
- Town hall

- Coat of arms
- Location of Subligny
- Location within France Location within Centre-Val de Loire
- Coordinates: 47°24′16″N 2°45′19″E
- Country: France
- Region: Centre-Val de Loire
- Department: Cher
- Arrondissement: Bourges
- Canton: Sancerre
- Intercommunality: CC Pays Fort Sancerrois Val de Loire

Government
  - Mayor (2020–2026): Régine Audry
- Area^{1}: 17.26 km^{2} (6.66 sq mi)
- Elevation: 220 m (720 ft)
- Highest elevation: 336 m (1,102 ft)
- Lowest elevation: 217 m (712 ft)
- Population (2023): 337
  - Density: 19.5/km^{2} (50.6/sq mi)
- Time zone: UTC+01:00 (CET)
  - Summer (DST): UTC+02:00 (CEST)
- INSEE/Postal code: 18256 /18260
- ^{1} French Land Register data, which excludes lakes, ponds, glaciers > 1 km^{2} (0.386 sq mi or 247 acres) and river estuaries.

Subligny (French pronunciation: [sybliɲi]) is a commune in the Cher department in the Centre-Val de Loire region of France.

== Geography ==
The commune occupies an area of forestry and farming comprising the village and a couple of hamlets situated in the valley of the River Salereine, about 26 miles (42 km) northeast of Bourges, at the junction of the D55 with the D57 and D152 roads.

== Population ==
Historical population
| Year | Pop. | ±% p.a. |
|---|---|---|
| 1968 | 405 | — |
| 1975 | 360 | −1.67% |
| 1982 | 348 | −0.48% |
| 1990 | 320 | −1.04% |
| 1999 | 303 | −0.60% |
| 2007 | 353 | +1.93% |
| 2012 | 335 | −1.04% |
| 2017 | 341 | +0.36% |
| 2023 | 337 | −0.20% |
Source: INSEE

== See also ==
- Communes of the Cher department
