= Dampierre-en-Crot =

- Commune
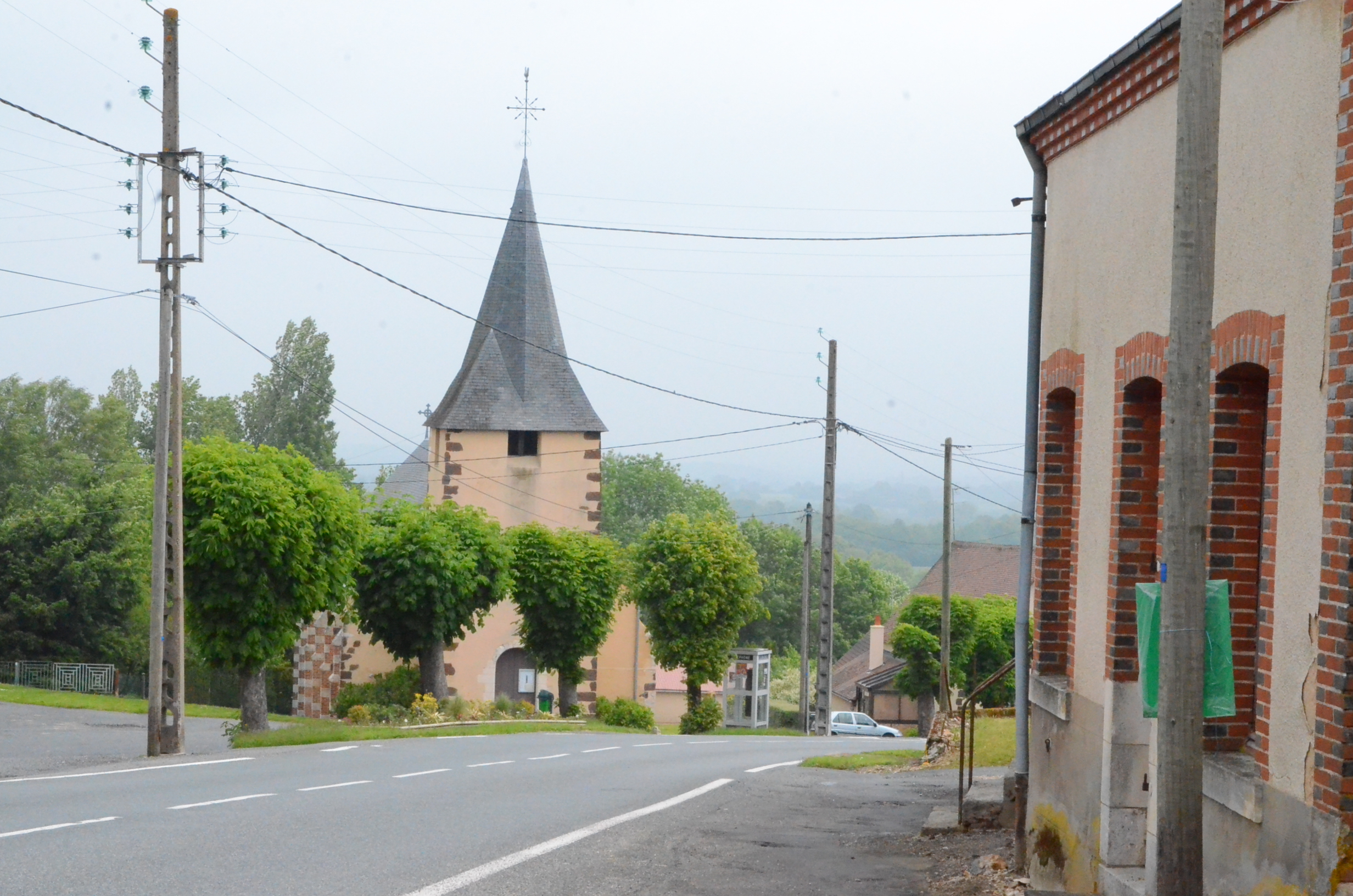
- The church in Dampierre-en-Crôt
- Location of Dampierre-en-Crot
- Location within France Location within Centre-Val de Loire
- Coordinates: 47°27′41″N 2°35′01″E
- Country: France
- Region: Centre-Val de Loire
- Department: Cher
- Arrondissement: Bourges
- Canton: Sancerre
- Intercommunality: CC Pays Fort Sancerrois Val de Loire

Government
  - Mayor (2020–2026): Bertrand Lejus
- Area^{1}: 22.05 km^{2} (8.51 sq mi)
- Elevation: 250 m (820 ft)
- Highest elevation: 321 m (1,053 ft)
- Lowest elevation: 186 m (610 ft)
- Population (2023): 205
  - Density: 9.30/km^{2} (24.1/sq mi)
- Time zone: UTC+01:00 (CET)
  - Summer (DST): UTC+02:00 (CEST)
- INSEE/Postal code: 18084 /18260
- ^{1} French Land Register data, which excludes lakes, ponds, glaciers > 1 km^{2} (0.386 sq mi or 247 acres) and river estuaries.

Dampierre-en-Crot (French pronunciation: [dɑ̃pjɛʁ ɑ̃ kʁo]) is a commune in the Cher department in the Centre-Val de Loire region of France.

== Geography ==
A small farming village situated by the banks of the Ionne river, some 28 miles (45 km) north of Bourges at the junction of the D923 and D95 roads.

== Population ==
Historical population
Year	Pop.	±% p.a.
1968	312	—
1975	262	−2.46%
1982	239	−1.30%
1990	266	+1.35%
1999	239	−1.18%
2007	221	−0.97%
2012	210	−1.02%
2017	204	−0.58%
2023	205	+0.08%
Source: INSEE

== Sights ==
- The church, dating from the 12th century.
- The restored late 17th-century auberge.
- Two old watermills.

== See also ==
- Communes of the Cher department
