= Concressault =

- Commune
- Coat of arms
- Location of Concressault
- Location within France Location within Centre-Val de Loire
- Coordinates: 47°29′24″N 2°34′37″E
- Country: France
- Region: Centre-Val de Loire
- Department: Cher
- Arrondissement: Bourges
- Canton: Sancerre
- Intercommunality: CC Pays Fort Sancerrois Val de Loire

Government
  - Mayor (2020–2026): Antoine Fleuriet
- Area^{1}: 7.45 km^{2} (2.88 sq mi)
- Elevation: 183 m (600 ft)
- Highest elevation: 272 m (892 ft)
- Lowest elevation: 175 m (574 ft)
- Population (2023): 192
  - Density: 25.8/km^{2} (66.7/sq mi)
- Time zone: UTC+01:00 (CET)
  - Summer (DST): UTC+02:00 (CEST)
- INSEE/Postal code: 18070 /18260
- ^{1} French Land Register data, which excludes lakes, ponds, glaciers > 1 km^{2} (0.386 sq mi or 247 acres) and river estuaries.

Concressault (French pronunciation: [kɔ̃kʁəso]) is a commune in the Cher department in the Centre-Val de Loire region of France by the banks of the Sauldre river, 27 miles (43 km) north of Bourges.

== Population ==
Historical population
Year	Pop.	±% p.a.
1968	261	—
1975	232	−1.67%
1982	216	−1.02%
1990	236	+1.11%
1999	214	−1.08%
2007	225	+0.63%
2012	218	−0.63%
2017	204	−1.32%
2023	192	−1.01%
Source: INSEE

== History ==
In the medieval period, Concressault was surrounded by fortifications and therefore had the status of city. The village developed around a castle built some distance from the older village of Dampierre-en-Crot. The new village ended up, at some point in the past, being more important than the first one.

=== The castle ===
In his manuscript on the Berry, Nicolas de Nicolay gave up a description of the castle as it was in 1567. According to him, he fortress got ruined by the English during the Hundred Years' War (1337–1453). A short time after the destruction it got rebuilt in a more solid form by the Duke Jean de Berry (1340–1416). The castle had an hexagonal shape, with 32 meters high and 12 meters thick walls made of hard rocks. Buildings were built out of colored bricks and covered by slate. The moats were 32 meters large and 4 meters deep.

Sir John Stewart of Darnley, a Scottish nobleman, was awarded the title of "Lord of Concressault" thanks to his participation to the Battle of Baugé. In March 1423, he also becomes the Lord of Aubigny-sur-Nère. Under the reign of Charles VII (1422–1462) the castle was besieged again by the English who were not able to take control of it. Chased by the French, they mistook a narrow pit for the Sauldre river, that they thought they could pass through a ford. Many of them sank and the pit got called "la fosse aux Anglais" (literally: the pit of the English).

== See also ==
- Communes of the Cher department
