= Thou, Cher =

Thou
- Commune
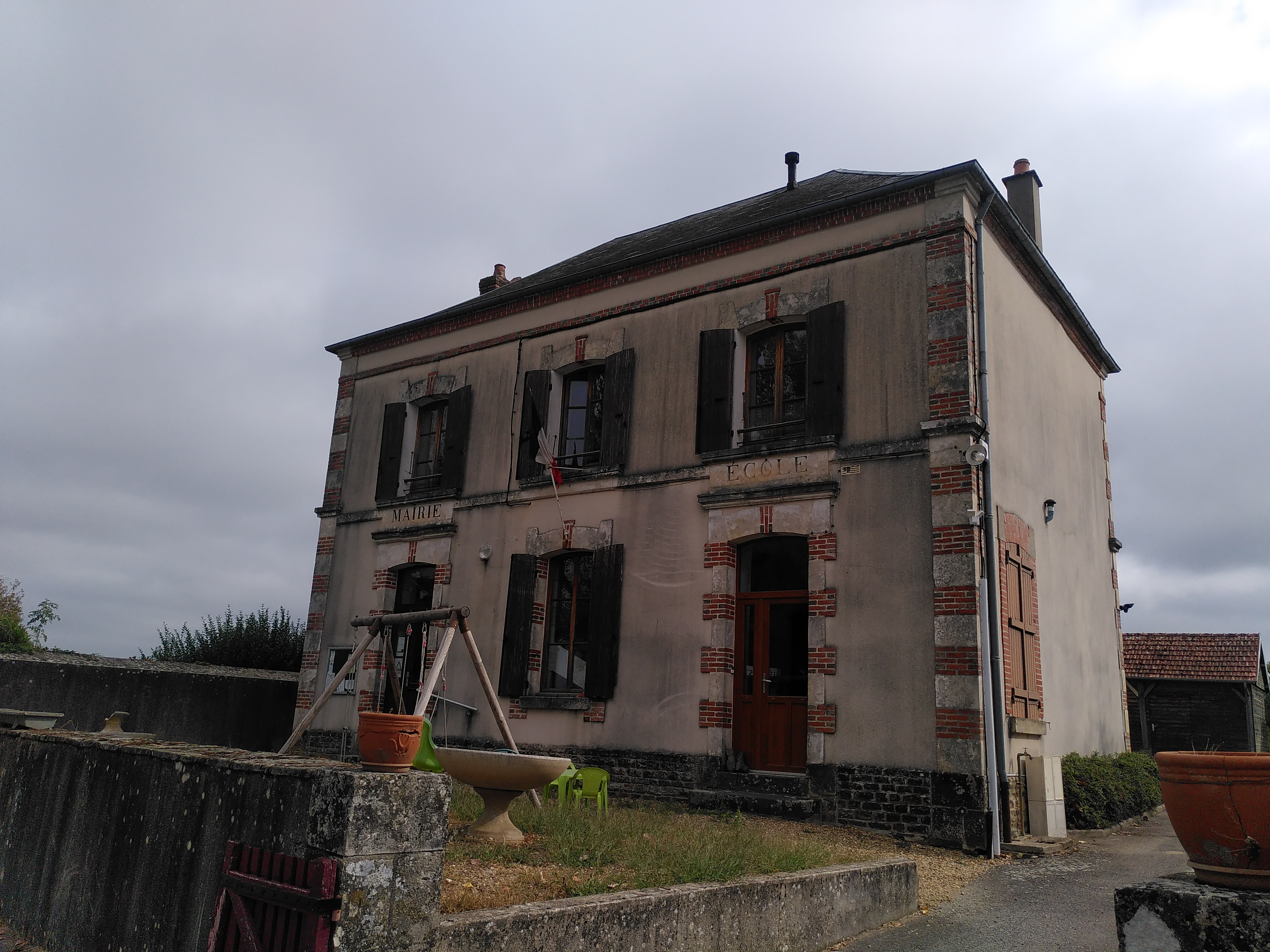
- Thou Town hall
- Location of Thou
- Location within France Location within Centre-Val de Loire
- Coordinates: 47°25′34″N 2°39′42″E
- Country: France
- Region: Centre-Val de Loire
- Department: Cher
- Arrondissement: Bourges
- Canton: Sancerre
- Intercommunality: CC Pays Fort Sancerrois Val de Loire

Government
  - Mayor (2020–2026): Oceane Bignon
- Area^{1}: 9.19 km^{2} (3.55 sq mi)
- Elevation: 245 m (804 ft)
- Highest elevation: 311 m (1,020 ft)
- Lowest elevation: 198 m (650 ft)
- Population (2023): 77
  - Density: 8.4/km^{2} (22/sq mi)
- Time zone: UTC+01:00 (CET)
  - Summer (DST): UTC+02:00 (CEST)
- INSEE/Postal code: 18264 /18260
- ^{1} French Land Register data, which excludes lakes, ponds, glaciers > 1 km^{2} (0.386 sq mi or 247 acres) and river estuaries.

Thou (French pronunciation: [tu]) is a commune in the Cher department in the Centre-Val de Loire region of France.

== Geography ==
A small farming village situated on the banks of both the Sauldre and Salereine rivers, about 26 miles (42 km) northeast of Bourges at the junction of the D96 with the D923 road.

== Population ==
Historical population
Year	Pop.	±% p.a.
1968	157	—
1975	133	−2.34%
1982	109	−2.80%
1990	74	−4.73%
1999	75	+0.15%
2007	78	+0.49%
2012	75	−0.78%
2017	76	+0.27%
2023	77	+0.22%
Source: INSEE

== Sights ==
- A church dating from the twentieth century.
- A fifteenth-century house.
- A watermill.

== See also ==
- Communes of the Cher department
