= Vailly-sur-Sauldre =

- Commune
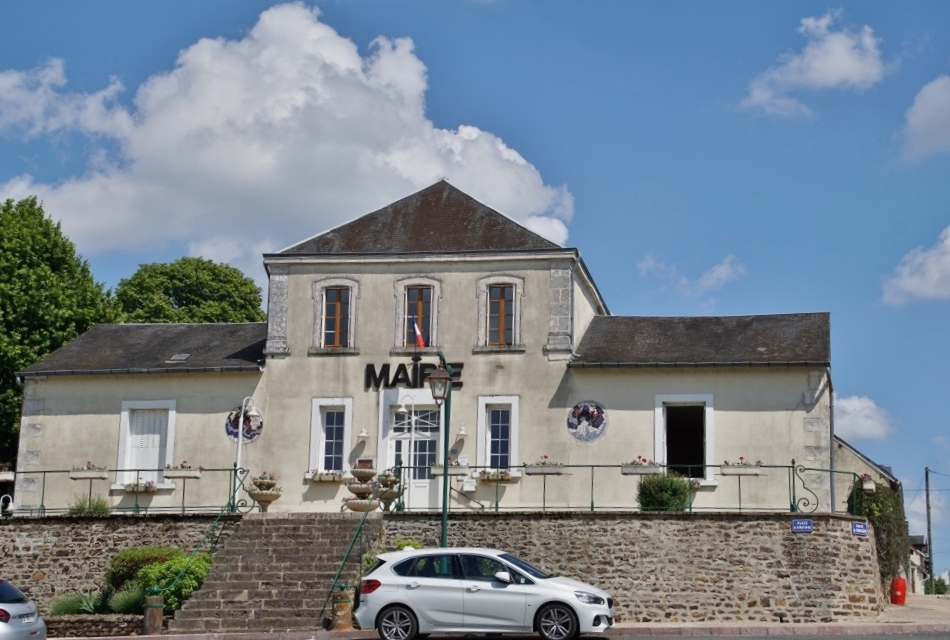
- Town hall

- Coat of arms
- Location of Vailly-sur-Sauldre
- Location within France Location within Centre-Val de Loire
- Coordinates: 47°27′31″N 2°39′04″E
- Country: France
- Region: Centre-Val de Loire
- Department: Cher
- Arrondissement: Bourges
- Canton: Sancerre
- Intercommunality: CC Pays Fort Sancerrois Val de Loire

Government
  - Mayor (2020–2026): Christelle Paye
- Area^{1}: 18.25 km^{2} (7.05 sq mi)
- Elevation: 198 m (650 ft)
- Highest elevation: 273 m (896 ft)
- Lowest elevation: 188 m (617 ft)
- Population (2023): 649
  - Density: 35.6/km^{2} (92.1/sq mi)
- Time zone: UTC+01:00 (CET)
  - Summer (DST): UTC+02:00 (CEST)
- INSEE/Postal code: 18269 /18260
- ^{1} French Land Register data, which excludes lakes, ponds, glaciers > 1 km^{2} (0.386 sq mi or 247 acres) and river estuaries.

Vailly-sur-Sauldre (French pronunciation: [vaji syʁ soldʁ], literally Vailly on Sauldre) is a commune in the Cher department in the Centre-Val de Loire region of France.

== Geography ==
A farming village situated on the banks of the Sauldre river, about 27 miles (43 km) northeast of Bourges at the junction of the D8 with the D923, D926 and D11 roads.

== Population ==
Historical population
Year	Pop.	±% p.a.
1968	759	—
1975	741	−0.34%
1982	856	+2.08%
1990	865	+0.13%
1999	806	−0.78%
2007	825	+0.29%
2012	786	−0.96%
2017	654	−3.61%
2023	649	−0.13%
Source: INSEE

== Sights ==
- The church of St. Martin, dating from the twelfth century.
- The ruins of a fourteenth-century castle.

== See also ==
- Communes of the Cher department
