= Villegenon =

- Commune
- Location of Villegenon
- Location within France Location within Centre-Val de Loire
- Coordinates: 47°25′35″N 2°36′24″E
- Country: France
- Region: Centre-Val de Loire
- Department: Cher
- Arrondissement: Bourges
- Canton: Sancerre
- Intercommunality: CC Pays Fort Sancerrois Val de Loire

Government
  - Mayor (2020–2026): Michel Katitsch
- Area^{1}: 32.93 km^{2} (12.71 sq mi)
- Elevation: 297 m (974 ft)
- Highest elevation: 359 m (1,178 ft)
- Lowest elevation: 194 m (636 ft)
- Population (2023): 217
  - Density: 6.59/km^{2} (17.1/sq mi)
- Time zone: UTC+01:00 (CET)
  - Summer (DST): UTC+02:00 (CEST)
- INSEE/Postal code: 18284 /18260
- ^{1} French Land Register data, which excludes lakes, ponds, glaciers > 1 km^{2} (0.386 sq mi or 247 acres) and river estuaries.

Villegenon (French pronunciation: [vilʒənɔ̃]) is a commune in the Cher department in the Centre-Val de Loire region of France.

== Geography ==
An area of forestry and farming comprising the village and a couple of hamlets situated about 26 miles (42 km) northeast of Bourges, at the junction of the D11, D7, D89 and the D926 roads. The commune is bounded by the banks of the small Ionne river to the north and the Sauldre to the east.

== Population ==
Historical population
Year	Pop.	±% p.a.
1968	403	—
1975	327	−2.94%
1982	271	−2.65%
1990	260	−0.52%
1999	245	−0.66%
2007	226	−1.00%
2012	229	+0.26%
2017	218	−0.98%
2023	217	−0.08%
Source: INSEE

== Sights ==
- The church of St. Georges.
- The fifteenth-century chateau.

== See also ==
- Communes of the Cher department
