= Jars, Cher =

Jars
- Commune
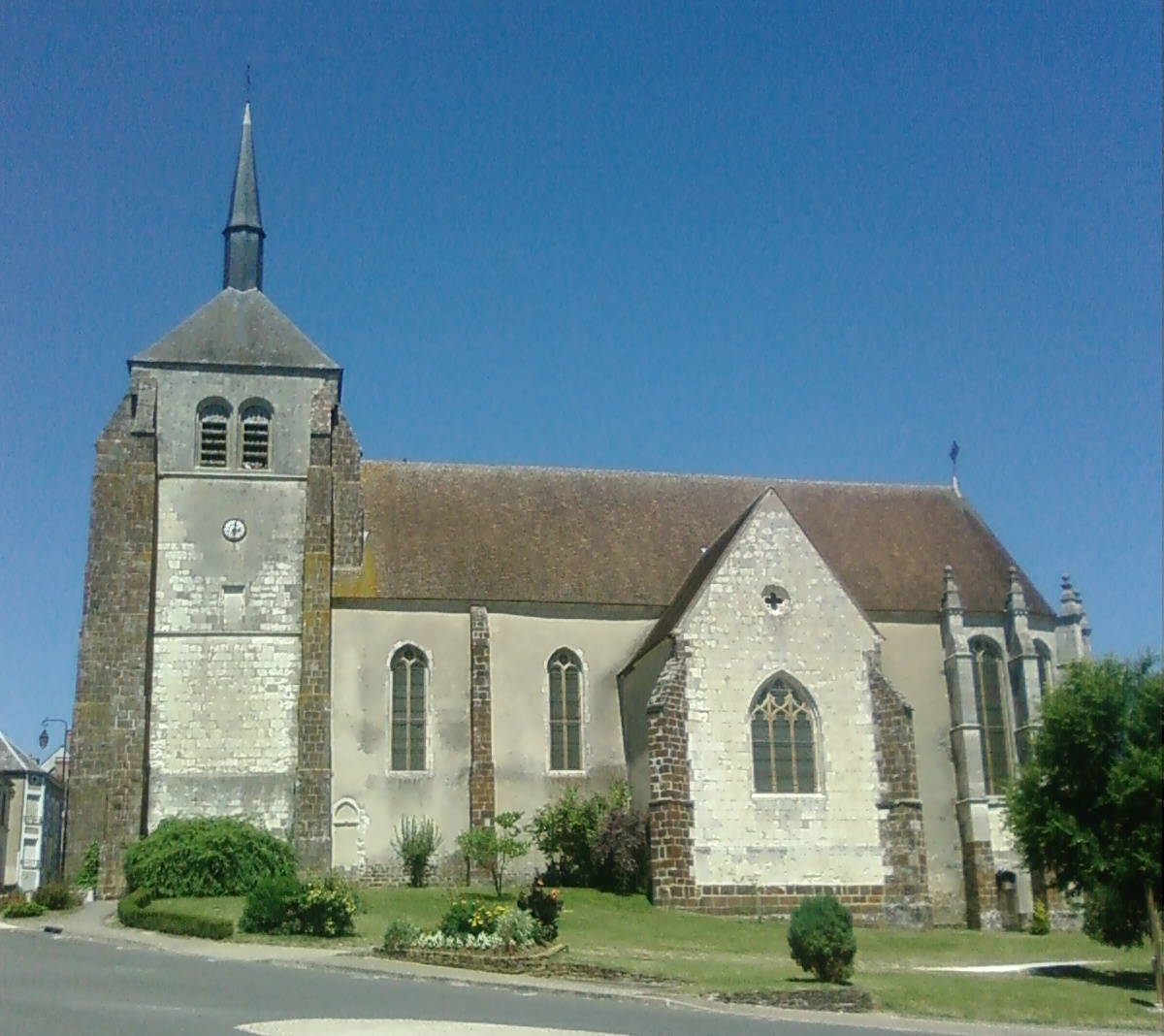
- The church of Saint-Agnan, in Jars

- Coat of arms
- Location of Jars
- Location within France Location within Centre-Val de Loire
- Coordinates: 47°23′46″N 2°41′01″E
- Country: France
- Region: Centre-Val de Loire
- Department: Cher
- Arrondissement: Bourges
- Canton: Sancerre
- Intercommunality: CC Pays Fort Sancerrois Val de Loire

Government
  - Mayor (2020–2026): Rémi Pierre
- Area^{1}: 37.34 km^{2} (14.42 sq mi)
- Elevation: 360 m (1,180 ft)
- Highest elevation: 364 m (1,194 ft)
- Lowest elevation: 204 m (669 ft)
- Population (2023): 481
  - Density: 12.9/km^{2} (33.4/sq mi)
- Time zone: UTC+01:00 (CET)
  - Summer (DST): UTC+02:00 (CEST)
- INSEE/Postal code: 18117 /18260
- ^{1} French Land Register data, which excludes lakes, ponds, glaciers > 1 km^{2} (0.386 sq mi or 247 acres) and river estuaries.

Jars is a commune in the Cher department in the Centre-Val de Loire region of France.

== Geography ==
An area of forestry and farming, comprising the village and several hamlets situated in the valley of the river Sauldre, some 24 miles (39 km) northeast of Bourges, at the junction of the D923, D55 and the D47 roads.

== Population ==
Historical population
Year	Pop.	±% p.a.
1968	596	—
1975	552	−1.09%
1982	554	+0.05%
1990	522	−0.74%
1999	505	−0.37%
2007	488	−0.43%
2012	511	+0.93%
2017	507	−0.16%
2023	481	−0.87%
Source: INSEE

== Sights ==
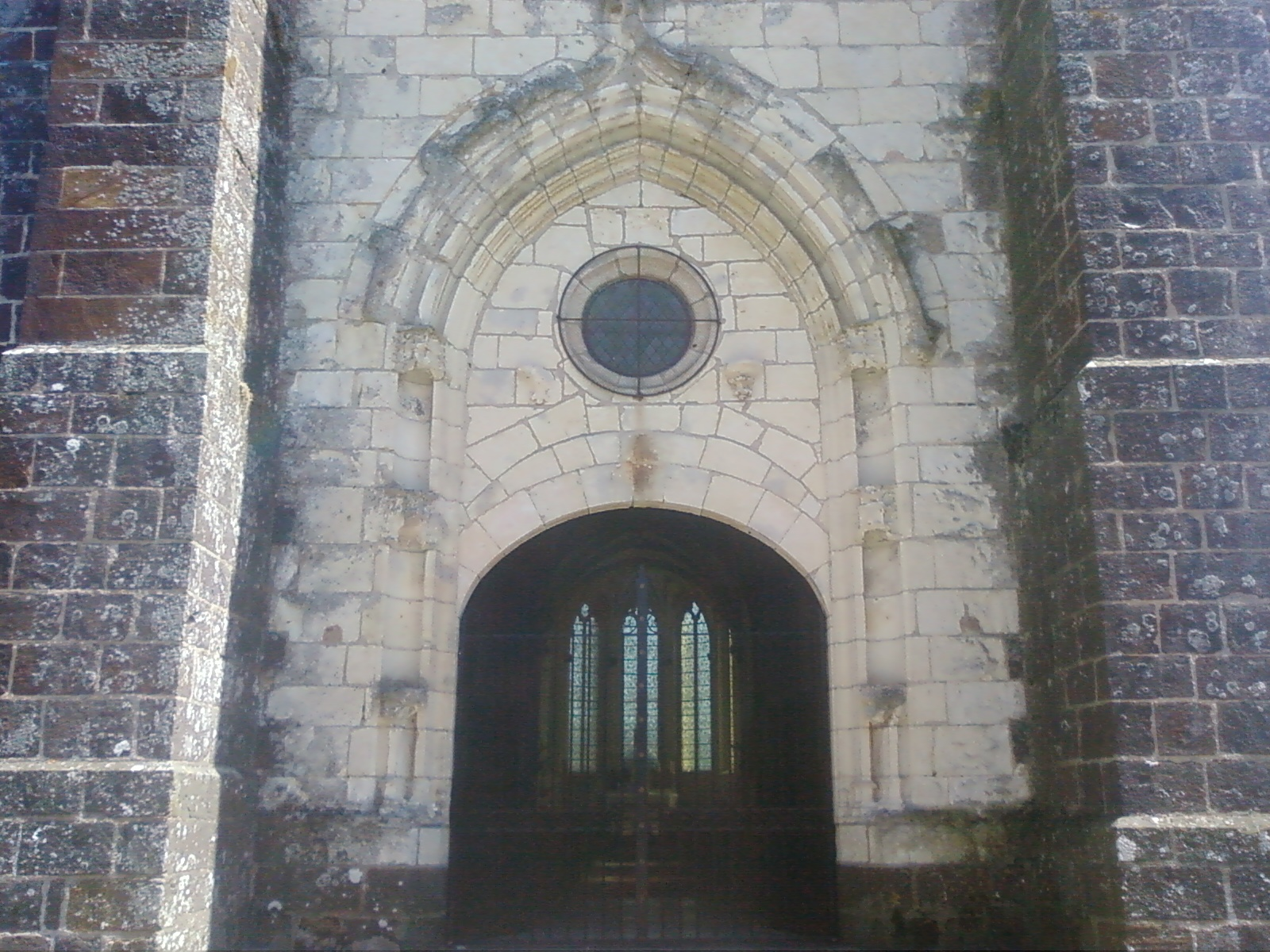
Church entrance

- The church of St. Aignan, dating from the fifteenth century.
- Traces of the castle of Nancray.
- An eighteenth-century house, the "Tisserands" and mill at the hamlet of Plansons-d'en-Bas.
- A fifteenth-century manorhouse with twin towers from an old gateway.

== See also ==
- Communes of the Cher department
