= Sury-ès-Bois =

- Commune
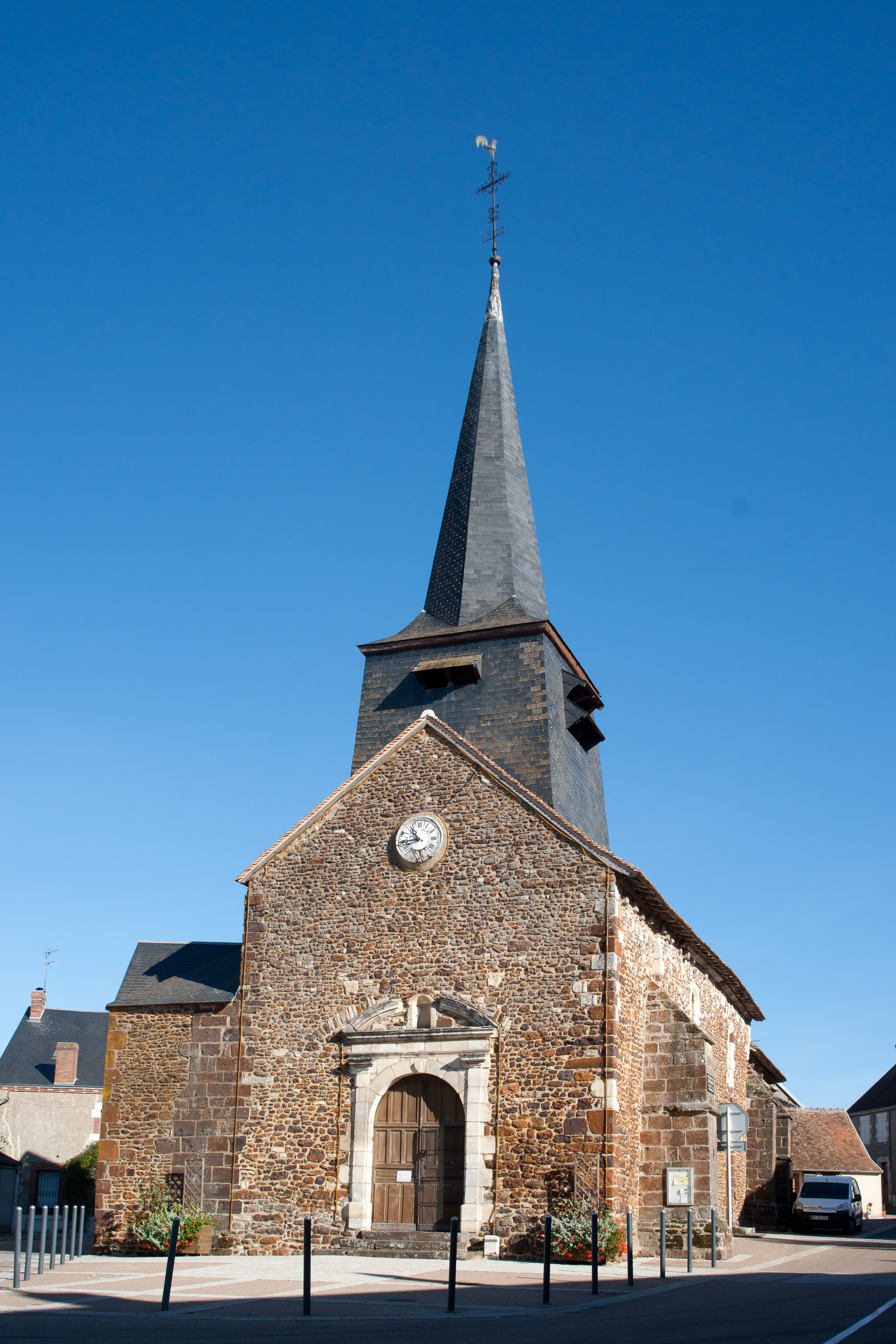
- The church in Sury-ès-Bois

- Coat of arms
- Location of Sury-ès-Bois
- Location within France Location within Centre-Val de Loire
- Coordinates: 47°27′55″N 2°42′18″E
- Country: France
- Region: Centre-Val de Loire
- Department: Cher
- Arrondissement: Bourges
- Canton: Sancerre
- Intercommunality: CC Pays Fort Sancerrois Val de Loire

Government
  - Mayor (2020–2026): Jean-Claude Rimbault
- Area^{1}: 31.9 km^{2} (12.3 sq mi)
- Elevation: 263 m (863 ft)
- Highest elevation: 336 m (1,102 ft)
- Lowest elevation: 200 m (660 ft)
- Population (2023): 311
  - Density: 9.75/km^{2} (25.3/sq mi)
- Time zone: UTC+01:00 (CET)
  - Summer (DST): UTC+02:00 (CEST)
- INSEE/Postal code: 18259 /18260
- ^{1} French Land Register data, which excludes lakes, ponds, glaciers > 1 km^{2} (0.386 sq mi or 247 acres) and river estuaries.

Sury-ès-Bois (French pronunciation: [syʁi ɛs bwa]) is a commune in the Cher department in the Centre-Val de Loire region of France.

== Geography ==
A large farming area comprising the village and several hamlets situated at the border with the department of Loiret about 32 miles (51 km) northeast of Bourges at the junction of the D13, D926 and the D74 roads. The commune's territory is the source of several small rivers.

== Population ==
Historical population
Year	Pop.	±% p.a.
1968	506	—
1975	423	−2.53%
1982	371	−1.86%
1990	350	−0.73%
1999	315	−1.16%
2007	293	−0.90%
2012	260	−2.36%
2017	270	+0.76%
2023	311	+2.38%
Source: INSEE

== Sights ==
- The church of St. Martin, dating from the fifteenth century.
- The manorhouse of l'Asnerie.
- Traces of the old priory of Saint-Anne.
- The thirteenth-century chapel of the chateau of Charpignon.

== See also ==
- Communes of the Cher department
