= Léré, Cher =

Léré
- Commune
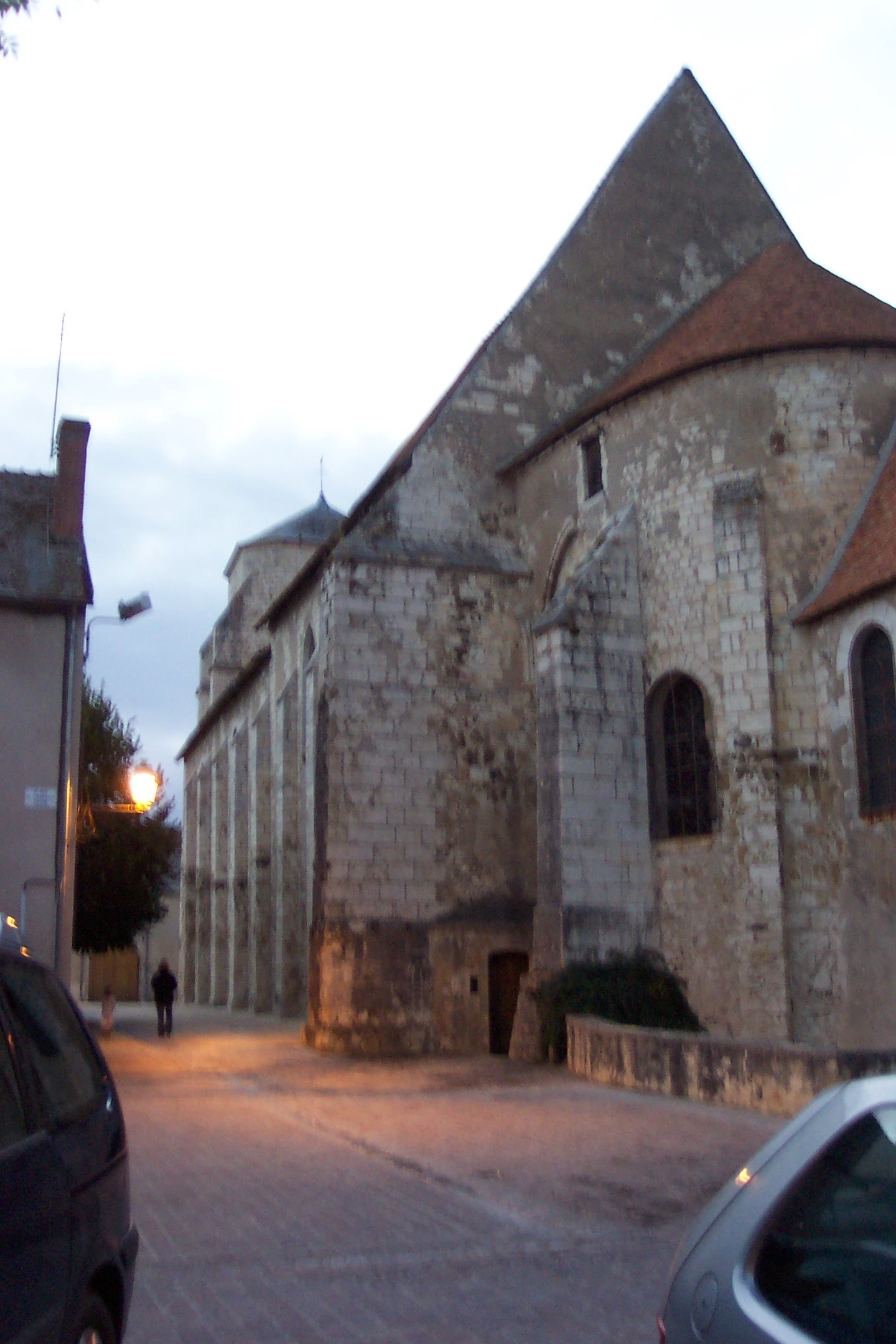
- The collegiate church of Saint-Martin, in Léré

- Coat of arms
- Location of Léré
- Location within France Location within Centre-Val de Loire
- Coordinates: 47°28′15″N 2°52′26″E
- Country: France
- Region: Centre-Val de Loire
- Department: Cher
- Arrondissement: Bourges
- Canton: Sancerre
- Intercommunality: CC Pays Fort Sancerrois Val de Loire

Government
  - Mayor (2020–2026): François Renaud
- Area^{1}: 15.98 km^{2} (6.17 sq mi)
- Highest elevation: 198 m (650 ft)
- Lowest elevation: 132 m (433 ft)
- Population (2023): 1,110
  - Density: 69.5/km^{2} (180/sq mi)
- Time zone: UTC+01:00 (CET)
  - Summer (DST): UTC+02:00 (CEST)
- INSEE/Postal code: 18125 /18240
- ^{1} French Land Register data, which excludes lakes, ponds, glaciers > 1 km^{2} (0.386 sq mi or 247 acres) and river estuaries.

Léré (French pronunciation: [leʁe]) is a commune in the Cher department in the Centre-Val de Loire region of France.

== Geography ==
A farming area comprising a very small town and several hamlets situated by the banks of the Loire lateral canal in the valley of the river Loire, some 35 miles (56 km) northeast of Bourges, at the junction of the D951, D751 and the D42 roads.

== Population ==
Historical population
Year	Pop.	±% p.a.
1968	923	—
1975	880	−0.68%
1982	925	+0.71%
1990	1,161	+2.88%
1999	1,296	+1.23%
2007	1,226	−0.69%
2012	1,156	−1.17%
2017	1,098	−1.02%
2023	1,110	+0.18%
Source: INSEE

== Sights ==
- The church of St. Martin, dating from the fourteenth century.
- A fifteenth-century manorhouse.
- The chateau of Villate, dating from the fifteenth century.

== See also ==
- Communes of the Cher department
