= Canton of Sancerre =

Coordinates: 47°19′55″N 2°50′23″E

Sancerre
- Canton
- Interactive map of Sancerre
- Country: France
- Region: Centre-Val de Loire
- Department: Cher
- No. of communes: {{{nbcomm}}}
- Area: 687.99 km^{2} (265.63 sq mi)
- Population (2023): 18,023
  - Density: 26.197/km^{2} (67.849/sq mi)
- INSEE code: 18 16

The Canton of Sancerre is a canton situated in the Cher département and is in the Centre-Val de Loire region of France.

== Geography ==
An area of farming and winegrowing in the valley of the river Loire, in the northeastern part of the arrondissement of Bourges centred on the town of Sancerre. The altitude varies from 139m at Bannay to 392m at Sens-Beaujeu, with an average altitude of 219m.

== Composition ==
At the French canton reorganisation which came into effect in March 2015, the canton was expanded from 18 to 36 communes:

- Assigny
- Bannay
- Barlieu
- Belleville-sur-Loire
- Boulleret
- Bué
- Concressault
- Couargues
- Crézancy-en-Sancerre
- Dampierre-en-Crot
- Feux
- Gardefort
- Jalognes
- Jars
- Léré
- Menetou-Râtel
- Ménétréol-sous-Sancerre
- Le Noyer
- Saint-Bouize
- Sainte-Gemme-en-Sancerrois
- Saint-Satur
- Sancerre
- Santranges
- Savigny-en-Sancerre
- Sens-Beaujeu
- Subligny
- Sury-en-Vaux
- Sury-ès-Bois
- Sury-près-Léré
- Thauvenay
- Thou
- Vailly-sur-Sauldre
- Veaugues
- Verdigny
- Villegenon
- Vinon

== Population ==
Historical population
Year	Pop.	±% p.a.
2013	18,945	—
2018	18,476	−0.50%
Source: INSEE

== See also ==
- Arrondissements of the Cher department
- Cantons of the Cher department
- Communes of the Cher department
