= Barlieu =

- Commune
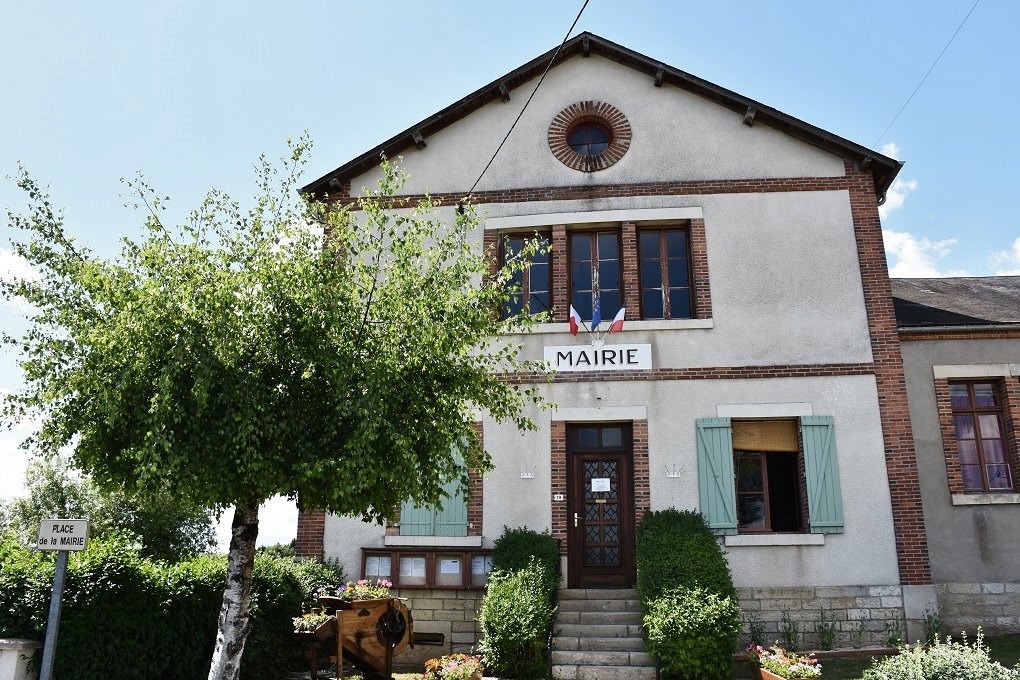
- The town hall

- Coat of arms
- Location of Barlieu
- Location within France Location within Centre-Val de Loire
- Coordinates: 47°29′21″N 2°37′46″E
- Country: France
- Region: Centre-Val de Loire
- Department: Cher
- Arrondissement: Bourges
- Canton: Sancerre
- Intercommunality: CC Pays Fort Sancerrois Val de Loire

Government
  - Mayor (2020–2026): Marc Verbeke
- Area^{1}: 27.87 km^{2} (10.76 sq mi)
- Elevation: 245 m (804 ft)
- Highest elevation: 296 m (971 ft)
- Lowest elevation: 181 m (594 ft)
- Population (2023): 334
  - Density: 12.0/km^{2} (31.0/sq mi)
- Time zone: UTC+01:00 (CET)
  - Summer (DST): UTC+02:00 (CEST)
- INSEE/Postal code: 18022 /18260
- ^{1} French Land Register data, which excludes lakes, ponds, glaciers > 1 km^{2} (0.386 sq mi or 247 acres) and river estuaries.

Barlieu (French pronunciation: [baʁljø]) is a commune in the French department of Cher, Centre-Val de Loire, France.

== History ==
In 1136, a papal bull mentioned the church at Barlieu as "Ecclesiam de Barlocco. The parish church, dedicated to Saint Germain, was initially appointed to the abbot of Saint-Satur and a priory, called the "chaplaincy Barlieu", was built here.
As an old fortified place with a public square, the village belonged to the house of Sancerre in 1152.
In 1190, before his departure for the Crusades, Count Stephen I, Count of Sancerre, gave the residents "the customs of Lorris", which allowed them to hold markets and fairs.
At the beginning of the fifteenth century, the lordship of Barlieu was sold to Martin of Charpaigne Gouge, bishop of Clermont and Chancellor to the Duke of Berry. Later, Jacques de Montmorin inherited the place and sold it to Jacques Coeur in 1448 for the sum of two thousand gold crowns.
In 1458, following Coeur’s downfall, the seigneury of Barlieu was purchased by John V of Bueil, Count of Sancerre. The land remained in the hands of the Bueil family until 1628, when it was acquired by Henry II de Bourbon, prince de Condé, the governor of Berry. The last seigneur was Louise-Élisabeth de Bourbon-Condé, Countess of Sancerre, who died in 1775.

== Geography ==
A farming area comprising the village and two hamlets situated by the banks of the river Sauldre, some 26 miles (42 km) northeast of Bourges at the junction of the D57 with the D21, D8 and the D95 roads.

== Population ==
Historical population
Year	Pop.	±% p.a.
1968	537	—
1975	459	−2.22%
1982	413	−1.50%
1990	433	+0.59%
1999	363	−1.94%
2007	401	+1.25%
2012	392	−0.45%
2017	359	−1.74%
2023	334	−1.20%
Source: INSEE

== Places of interest ==
- The church of St. Germain, dating from the twelfth century.
- A watermill.

== See also ==
- Communes of the Cher department
