= Bourbonnais route =

The Bourbonnais route is a connection of four canals in France from Saint-Mammès on the Seine to Chalon-sur-Saône on the Saône River: It includes the Canal du Loing, Canal de Briare, Canal latéral à la Loire, and Canal du Centre.

== History ==
The first section of the route, the Canal de Briare was completed in 1642. It was the first summit level canal using pound locks in Europe. It connected the valleys of the Loire and the Seine. At this time, boats could go from the Loire in Briare, via this canal, to the Loing near Montargis, and then down the Loing to the Seine and continue into Paris.

Though not part of this route today, the Canal d'Orléans was started in 1682 to connect Orléans, on the Loing River, to the northern terminus of the Canal de Briare. This would provide competing routes from the Loire river to the Loing river.

The trip on the Loing from Montargis to the Seine was greatly improved by the creation of the Canal du Loing during 1720–1723. It is largely a lateral canal, using only two portions of the actual river.

In 1792, the Canal du Centre connected the Loire in Digoin to the Saône at Chalon-sur-Saône.

The use of the river Loire was replaced by the Canal latéral à la Loire during 1827–1838. It connected the Canal de Briare at Briare and the Canal du Centre at Digoin. At this time, the Loire was crossed at level. Later, this crossing would be replaced by the Briare aqueduct.

== Specifics ==
Canal	From	To	KM	Locks
Canal du Loing	Saint-Mammès	Montargis	49	18
Canal de Briare	Montargis	Briare	55	32
Canal latéral à la Loire	Briare	Digoin	196	38
Canal du Centre	Digoin	Chalon-sur-Saône	114	61

== En Route ==
Canal du Loing	Canal de Briare	Canal latéral à la Loire	Canal du Centre
T junction with Haute Seine; PK 49 Saint-Mammès; PK 30 Nemours; PK 19 Souppes-sur-Loing; PK 3 Cepoy	PK 52 Montargis; PK 29 Châtillon-Coligny; PK 19 Rogny-les-Sept-Écluses; PK 1 Briare	PK 192 Châtillon-sur-Loire; PK 159.5 Saint-Satur; PK 125 Marseilles-lès-Aubigny; PK 100 Nevers; PK 68.5 Decize; PK 37.5 Beaulon; PK 4 Digoin	PK 102 Paray-le-Monial; PK 65 Montceau-les-Mines; PK 52 Montchanin; PK 33 Saint-Léger-sur-Dheune; PK 19 Chagny; PK 0 Chalon-sur-Saône; T junction with Saône

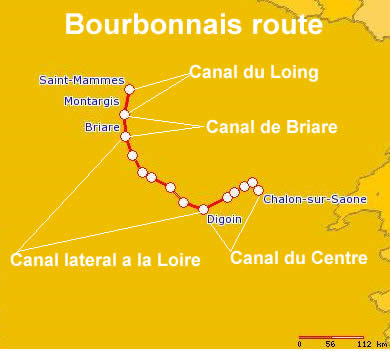
Bourbonnais route map

== See also ==
- List of canals in France
