= Châtillon Branch =

Embranchement de Châtillon

Specifications
- Length: 4 km (2.5 mi)
- Locks: 3

Geography
- Start point: Canal latéral à la Loire in L'Etang
- End point: Loire at Châtillon-sur-Loire
- Beginning coordinates: 47.56173°N 2.80714°E
- Ending coordinates: 47.59152°N 2.76692°E
- Branch of: Canal latéral à la Loire
- Connects to: Canal latéral à la Loire, Loire

The Embranchement de Châtillon (French pronunciation: [ɑ̃bʁɑ̃ʃmɑ̃ də ʃatijɔ̃]) is a branch of the Canal latéral à la Loire that connects to the Loire at Châtillon-sur-Loire.

== See also ==
- List of canals in France
