= Edith Clark =

French aviator and parachutist

Edith Georgette Clark
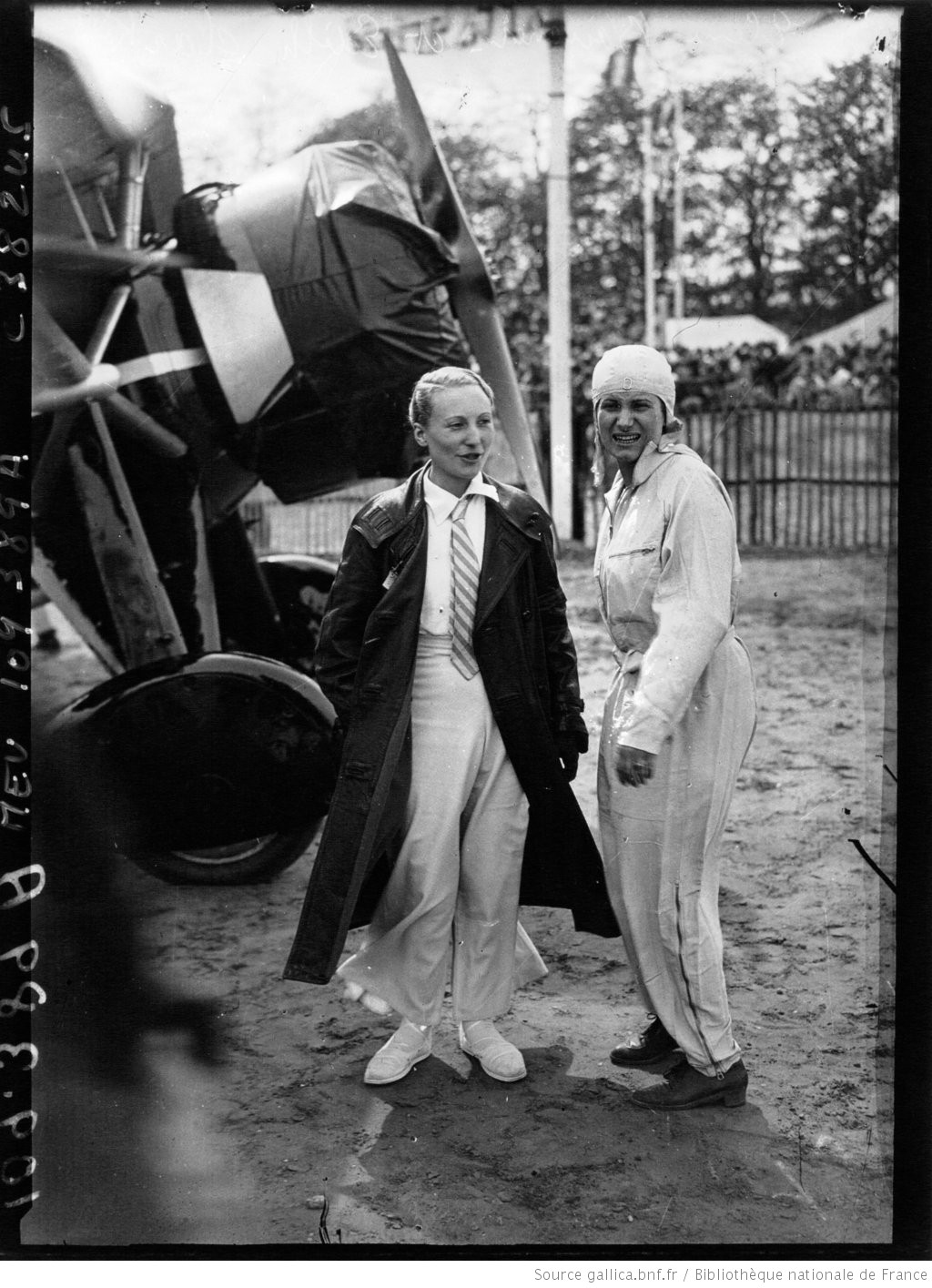
- Edith Clark (left) and Hélène Boucher at an aviation event in Vincennes in 1934
- Born: Édith Georgette Valentine Boiteux; 15 June 1904; Cuffy, France
- Died: 16 March 1937 (aged 32); Avignon, France
- Occupations: Aviator and parachutist

Edith Georgette Clark (also known as Edith Boiteux, 15 June 1904 – 16 March 1937) was a French aviator and parachutist.

== Biography ==
Clark was born in Cuffy, in the Cher region of France, on 15 June 1904. She worked as a typist and became interested in aviation; however, she could not afford the expenses of flying lessons on her salary. Instead, she started parachuting and earned money testing different types of military parachutes. She also aimed to set a record for jumping from the lowest permitted altitude, and performed stunts such as jumping from the top of a 20-metre (66 ft) fire engine ladder in Bucharest, and from the roof of the Cirque d'Hiver in Paris, which was only 15 metres (49 ft) above the ground.

In 1926, Clark joined a Freemasons Lodge in Paris, and became the secretary of the lodge.

Clark accompanied Madeleine Charnaux in her attempts to break altitude records, and on 29 January 1935 she was a passenger when Charnaux flew to 6,115 metres (20,062 ft), the altitude record for light aircraft.

In 1936, when the French parachutist permit had just been created, Clark was the first woman to obtain it from the Ministry of Air, which allowed her to officially become a professional parachutist.

Clark died in a parachuting accident on 16 March 1937 at the Avignon-Pujaut Military Training Center in Avignon. She had carried out two successful test jumps with a new model of Air Force parachute, when she jumped from a height of 500 metres (1,640 ft) and the parachute did not open. Despite the belated attempt to open her reserve parachute, she crashed to the ground and died on impact. It was her 200th parachute jump.

Clark's funeral was held in Paris, at the Sainte-Geneviève des Grandes-Carrières church, and she was initially buried in Meaux; however, her remains were later transferred to Nevers. The Ministry of Air gave Clark a posthumous citation recognising her bravery for the Ordre de la nation (Order of the Nation).
