= Léon Leloir =

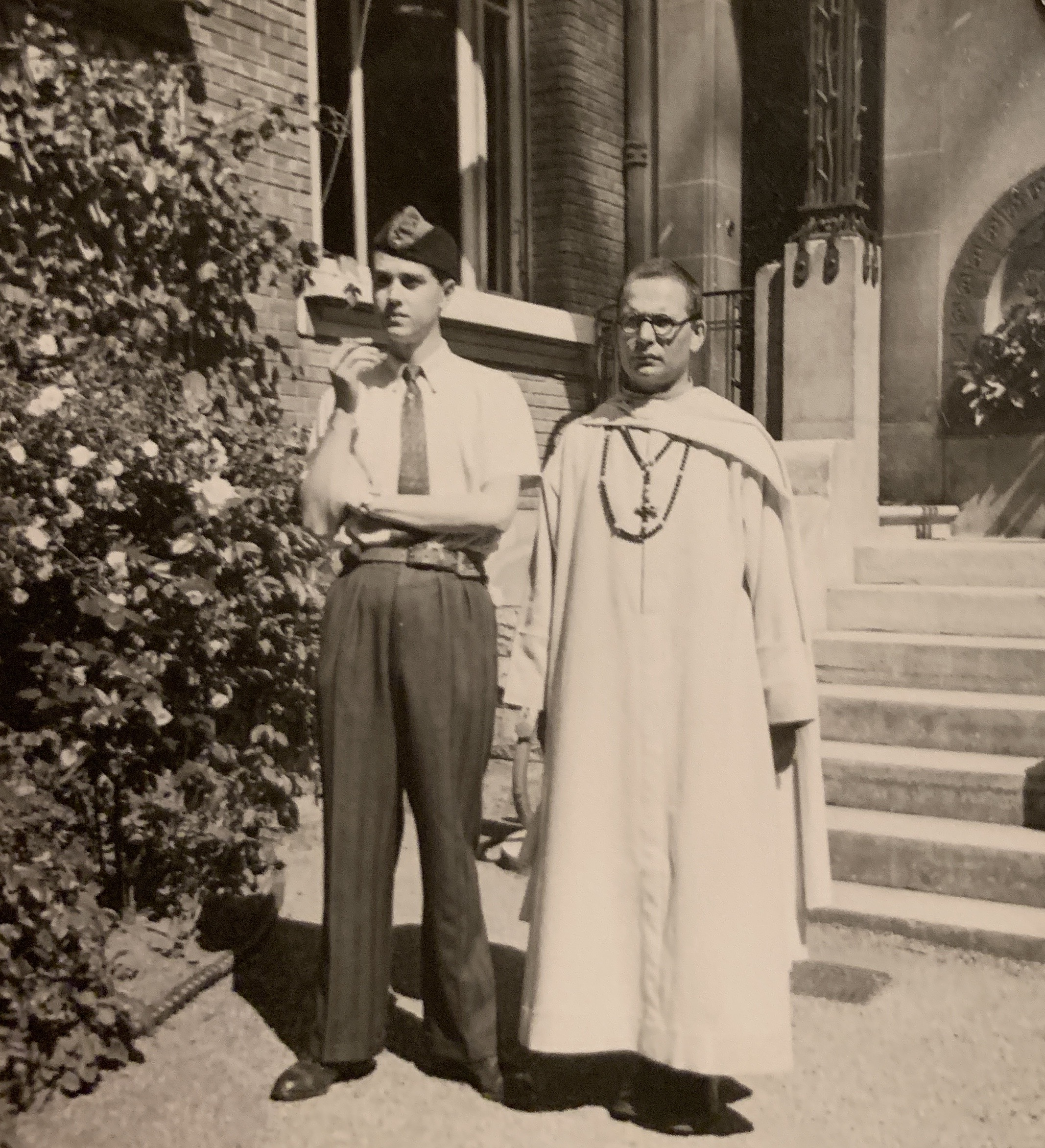
- Leloir (right) with Jacques Dognin in July 1945
- Born: Léon-Edward-Marie Leloir; December 29, 1907; Mons, Hainaut Province, Belgium
- Died: September 29, 1945 (aged 37); Briare, Loiret, France
- Occupations: Priest, writer
- Notable work: Je reviens de l'enfer (1945)

Léon Leloir (29 December 1907 – 29 September 1945) was a Belgian priest of the White Fathers and writer.

== Biography ==
Born into a Catholic family in Mons (Belgium), Léon Leloir entered the novitiate at the age of 19. He studied theology at the Catholic University of Leuven and presented his thesis in 1933. The following year, he was tasked with taking over the periodical of the Missionaries of Africa and, within a few months, transformed it into a successful journal known as Grands Lacs. He produced about a dozen issues per year, focusing primarily on French North Africa and the Belgian colonial empire, notably the Belgian Congo. A recognized writer, he also hosted theological broadcasts on the radio.

During the German occupation in World War II, Leloir joined the Belgian Resistance while continuing his ministry as chaplain of the maquis in the French and Belgian Ardennes. Arrested in July 1944, he was deported to Buchenwald concentration camp.

Following his release in April 1945, he quickly resumed his missionary activities, both as a writer and as a professor and lecturer. During one of his trips, he was involved in a car accident near Briare in France and died of his injuries on 29 September 1945.

== Authography ==
- Faux appel, Durendal, 1939.
- Le Maître et son disciple, ill. de Pierre Ickx, Durendal, 1944
- Je reviens de l'enfer, Éditions du Rendez-vous, Paris, 1945
- Les Paradoxes du retour, Éditions universitaires, Brussels, 1945
