= Loire Lateral Canal =

Canal in central France

Canal latéral à la Loire
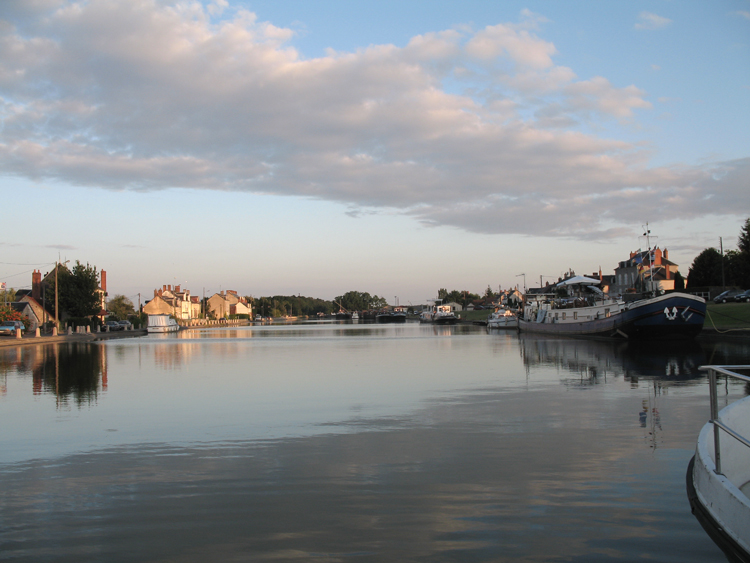
- The port on the canal at Marseilles-lès-Aubigny
- Interactive map of Canal latéral à la Loire

Specifications
- Length: 196.1 km (121.9 mi)
- Locks: 37 or 38

History
- Construction began: 1827
- Date completed: 1838

Geography
- Start point: Canal de Briare at Briare
- End point: Canal du Centre at Digoin
- Beginning coordinates: 47.63197°N 2.73671°E at aqueduct crossing Loire in Briare
- Ending coordinates: 46.47756°N 3.98053°E at aqueduct crossing Loire in Digoin
- Branch: Embranchement de Châtillon
- Connects to: Canal de Briare, Canal du Centre

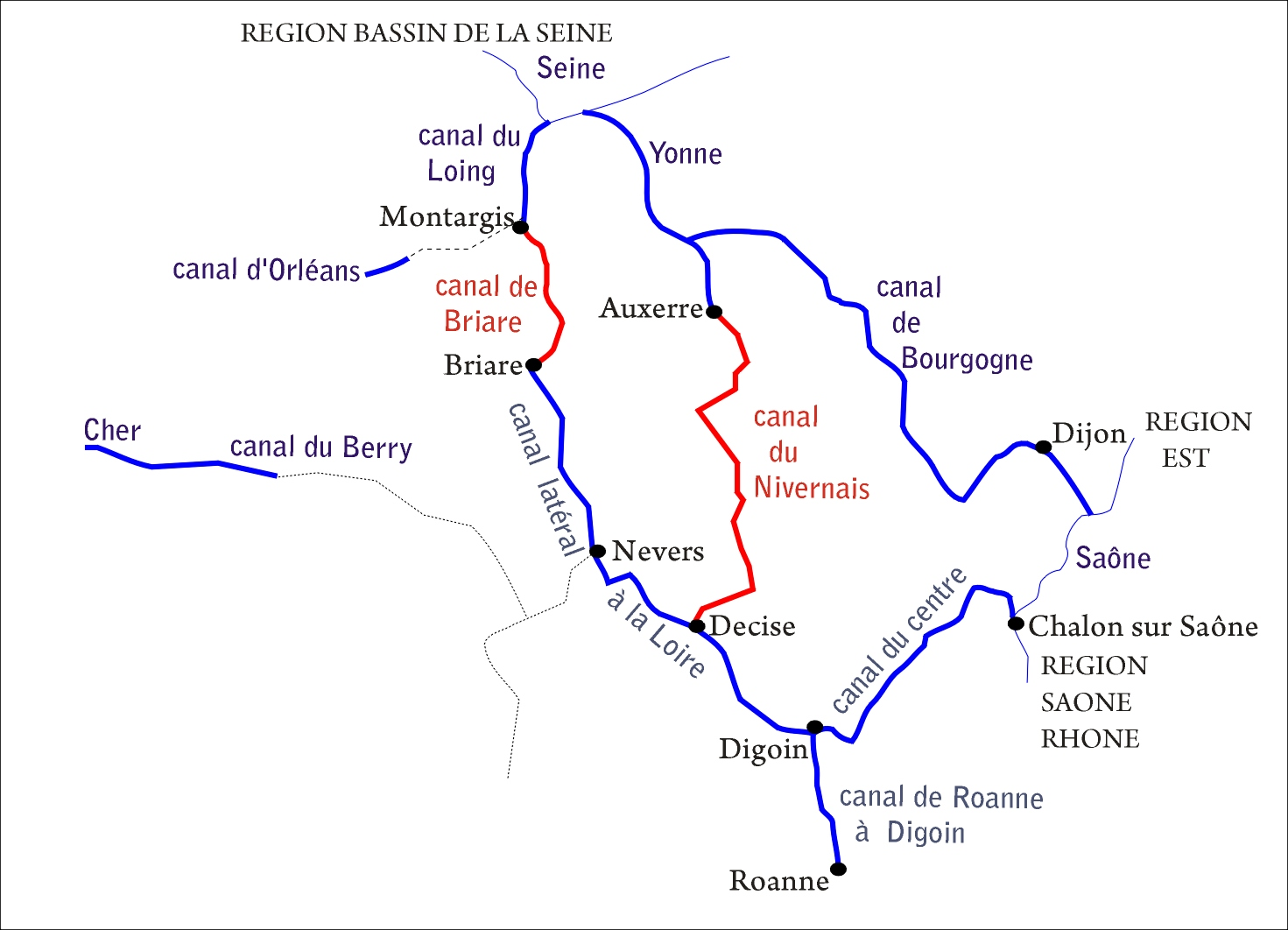
Canal latéral à la Loire and its connections

The Canal latéral à la Loire (French: [kanal lateʁal a la lwaʁ]; lit. 'Canal lateral to the Loire') was constructed between 1827 and 1838 to connect the Canal de Briare at Briare and the Canal du Centre at Digoin, a distance of 196 kilometres (122 mi). It replaced the use of the river Loire, which was unreliable during winter floods and summer droughts. Aqueducts were used to cross the Allier at Le Guétin (in the commune of Cuffy) and the Loire at Digoin. However, because of the extreme length required, an aqueduct was not built to cross the Loire at Briare until 1896, when the Briare aqueduct was constructed.

== History ==
By the late 18th century with the completion of the Canal du Centre, the Bourbonnais route from the Seine to the Saône was substantially the same as at present, except for the use of the navigable Loire between Briare and Digoin. The introduction of steam haulage and dredging failed to produce the reliability of the canals, so it was in 1822 that the order to build was finally given to the Compagnie des Quatre Canaux. Although the original intention was to place the canal on the right bank, the towns of Nevers, la Charité and Cosne had no room for a canal and eventually construction started in 1827 on a canal on the left bank. Two massive stone aqueducts were built at Digoin and at Guétin to avoid level crossings of rivers with length 243 m and 470 m respectively, but this was not possible at Briare because of the danger of blocking the river during flood periods.

With the adoption of the Freycinet gauge in 1879, and the upgrading of the canal system, the frequent delays of several days to cross the Loire at Briare became intolerable. The Briare aqueduct was built over the Loire in Briare between 1890 and 1896 by the engineer Abel Mazoyer to make a connection with the Canal de Briare four locks up from its initial entrance. The Briare aqueduct stands on fourteen piers. These support a single metal beam carrying a trough with more than 13,000 tonnes of water, 2.2 metres deep. The width of the aqueduct, towpaths included, is 11.5 metres and its length is 662.7 metres. Eight sluices make it possible to empty the aqueduct in the event of severe freezing.

== En Route ==
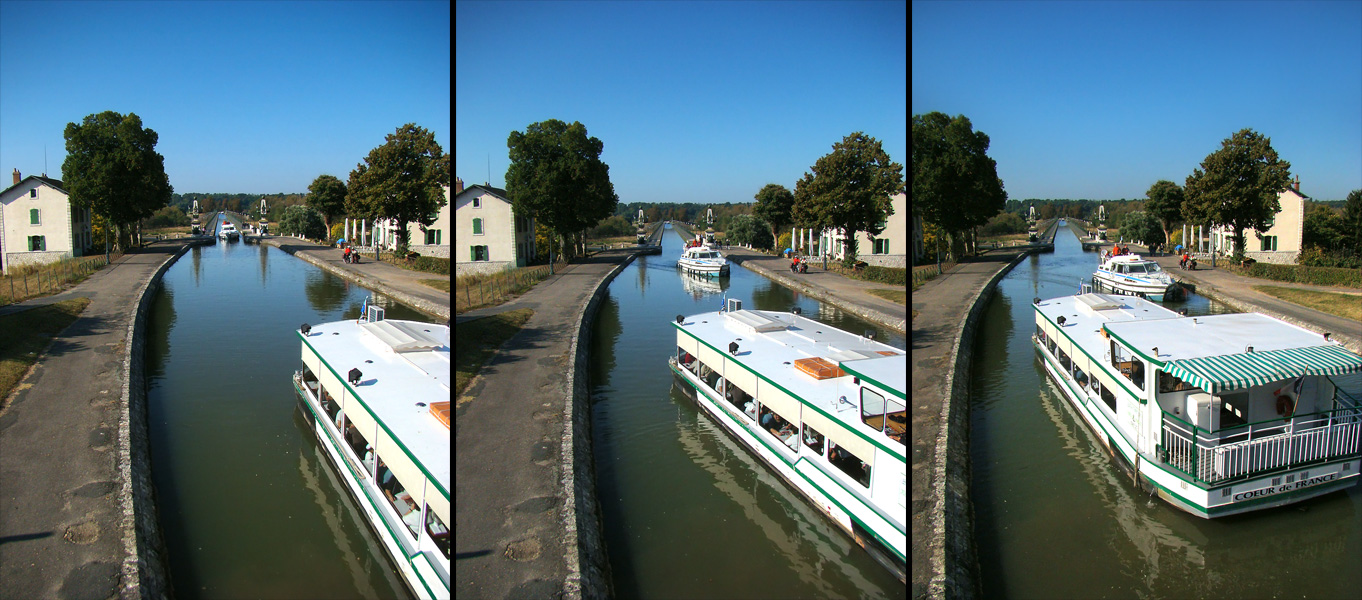
Cruise traffic in Briare

- PK 198 Briare
- PK 198 Briare aqueduct
- PK 192 Châtillon-sur-Loire
- PK 187 left to Châtillon branch canal for access to the river Loire
- PK 180 Belleville-sur-Loire
- PK 175 Léré
- PK 159.5 Saint-Satur or Saint-Thibault
- PK 143 Herry
- PK 125 Marseilles-lès-Aubigny
- PK 100 Nevers
- PK 68.5 Decize
- PK 53 Gannay-sur-Loire
- PK 41 Garnat-sur-Engievre
- PK 29 Dompierre-sur-Besbre right canal branch to Dompierre-sur-Besbre
- PK 15 Coulanges
- PK 4 Digoin
- PK 0 continues as Canal du Centre

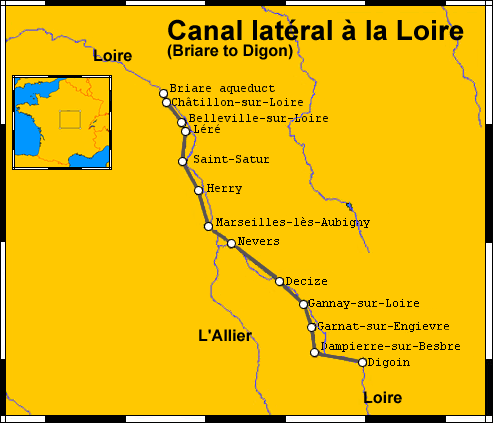
Canal latéral à la Loire route map

== See also ==
- List of canals in France
