= Canal du Centre =

Canal du Centre may mean:

- Canal du Centre (Belgium)
- Canal du Centre (France)
