= Adolphe Piot =

French painter

Étienne Adolphe Piot
- Born: 13 February 1831; Digoin, Bourgogne, France
- Died: 13 May 1910; Paris, France
- Occupation: Portrait painter

Étienne Adolphe Piot (French: [adɔlf pjo]; 1831 – 1910) was a French painter known for his portraits of young women. He exhibited in the Paris Salons from 1850 to 1909.

== Life ==
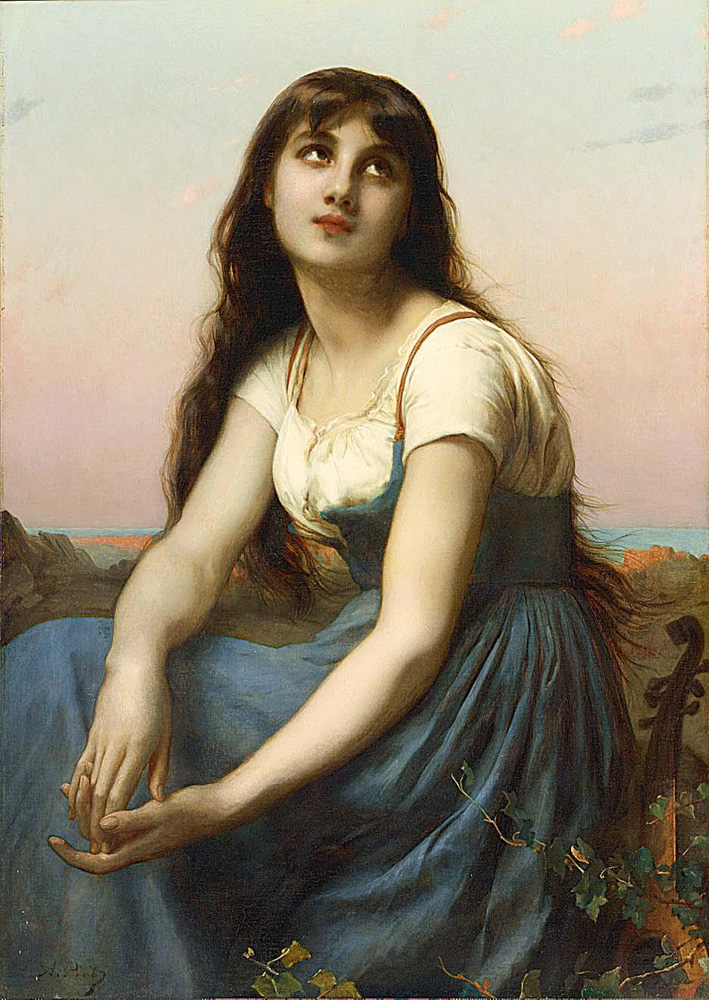
A Young Beauty

Étienne-Adolphe Piot was born on 13 February 1831 in Digoin, Saône-et-Loire, France. He moved to Paris and studied under Léon Cogniet. (Note: He has also been described as a student of William-Adolphe Bouguereau (1825–1905).) He first exhibited at the Paris Salon of 1850. In 1860 he was among the painters whose work was shown at the Exposition de Bordeaux. In 1864 he was living in New York City, and that year exhibited a portrait at the National Academy of Design. In 1869 he was again living in Paris, at 21 quai Malaquais in the 6th arrondissement. Up to 1876 he exhibited under the name of Adolphe Piot. Subsequently, he began to also use the names Adolphe-Étienne Piot and Étienne-Adolphe Piot.

In 1873 Adolphe Piot was described as "a Parisian painter of some name in treating Italian subjects". He was very successful commercially, taking advantage of the increasing demand for portraits from wealthy Parisians. During the Belle Époque every debutante had to have her portrait painted, and Piot was skilled in making captivating portraits. Piot became a member of the Société des Artistes Français in 1883. In 1890 he received an honorable mention for the work he exhibited at 1889 Exposition Universelle. His last Salon entry seems to have been submitted in 1909. (Note: The range of 59 years for Salon submissions is extremely long.)

== Work ==
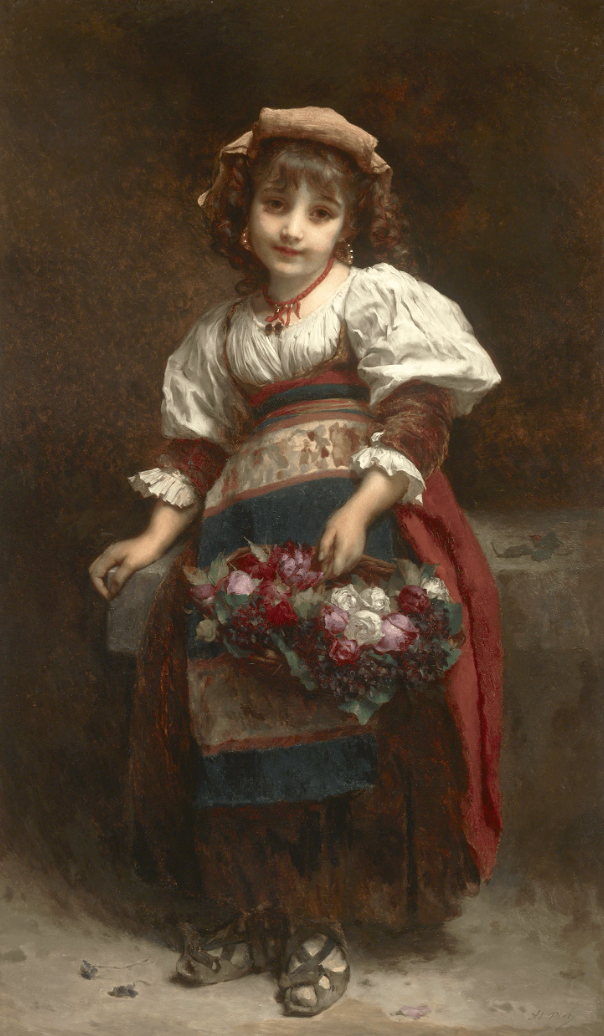
Young Girl with a Basket of Flowers, private collection

Most of Piot's early Salon submissions were commissioned portraits of women. With the 1870 Salon he began to exhibit genre works with titles such as Abandonée (The Abandoned), Coquetterie (Coquetry), and La Lettre (The Letter). Adolphe Piot created expressive depictions of beautiful women, with dark backgrounds to draw attention to the subject, and also made many works showing children. His works were innocent, picturesque and elegant, appealing to middle-class tastes of the time. An 1879 reviewer wrote,

A Frenchman, like M. Adolphe Piot, will dash upon the canvas a gracious little tableau, even if the subject is not a new one. A little brown Italian girl, with expressive black eyes, and hair that has been bleached and reddened from long exposure to the sun, is holding a basket of peaches and grapes, which she offers for sale to those who pass by. There is nothing in a subject like this to weary the imagination of the artist, but being a Frenchman he produces a graceful and pretty picture. The costume of "The Little Merchant" is picturesque, and on her face there is a smile which the Frenchmen call ravissant de grâce. The little mouth is full of expression, and we seem to hear the words: "Please buy my peaches and grapes."

Clarence Clark wrote in 1905 in his Art and Artists of Our Time,

A head by Piot is always pleasant to come upon in our galleries, and they have several times made their way to our shores [England]. There is nothing meretricious about them; the model is always well chosen for something beside mere regularity of features. We become interested in the personality of the artist's sitters.

His work is held by the Musée des Beaux-Arts de Rouen and the Brooklyn Museum, New York.

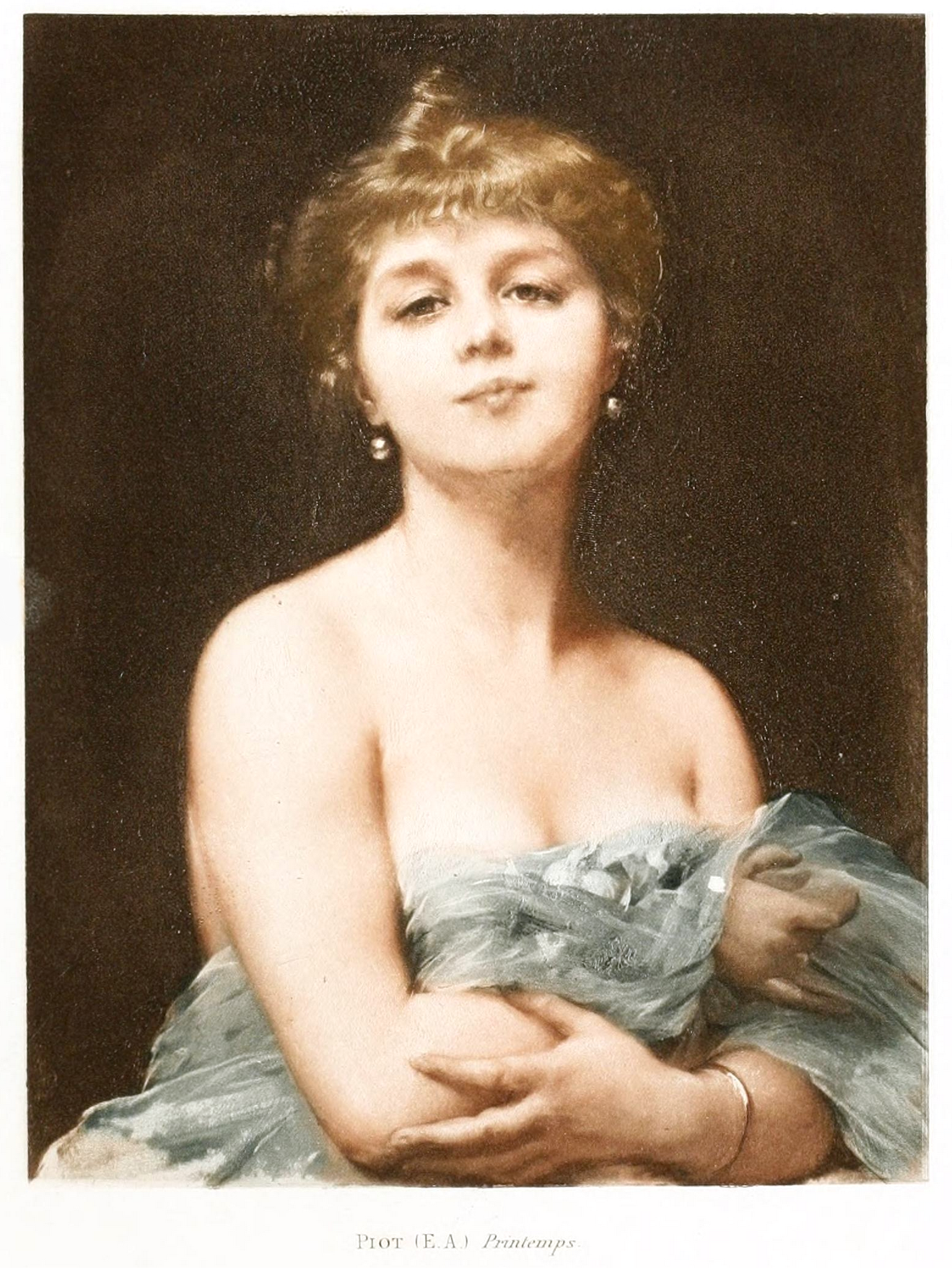
Printemps, Salon of 1892

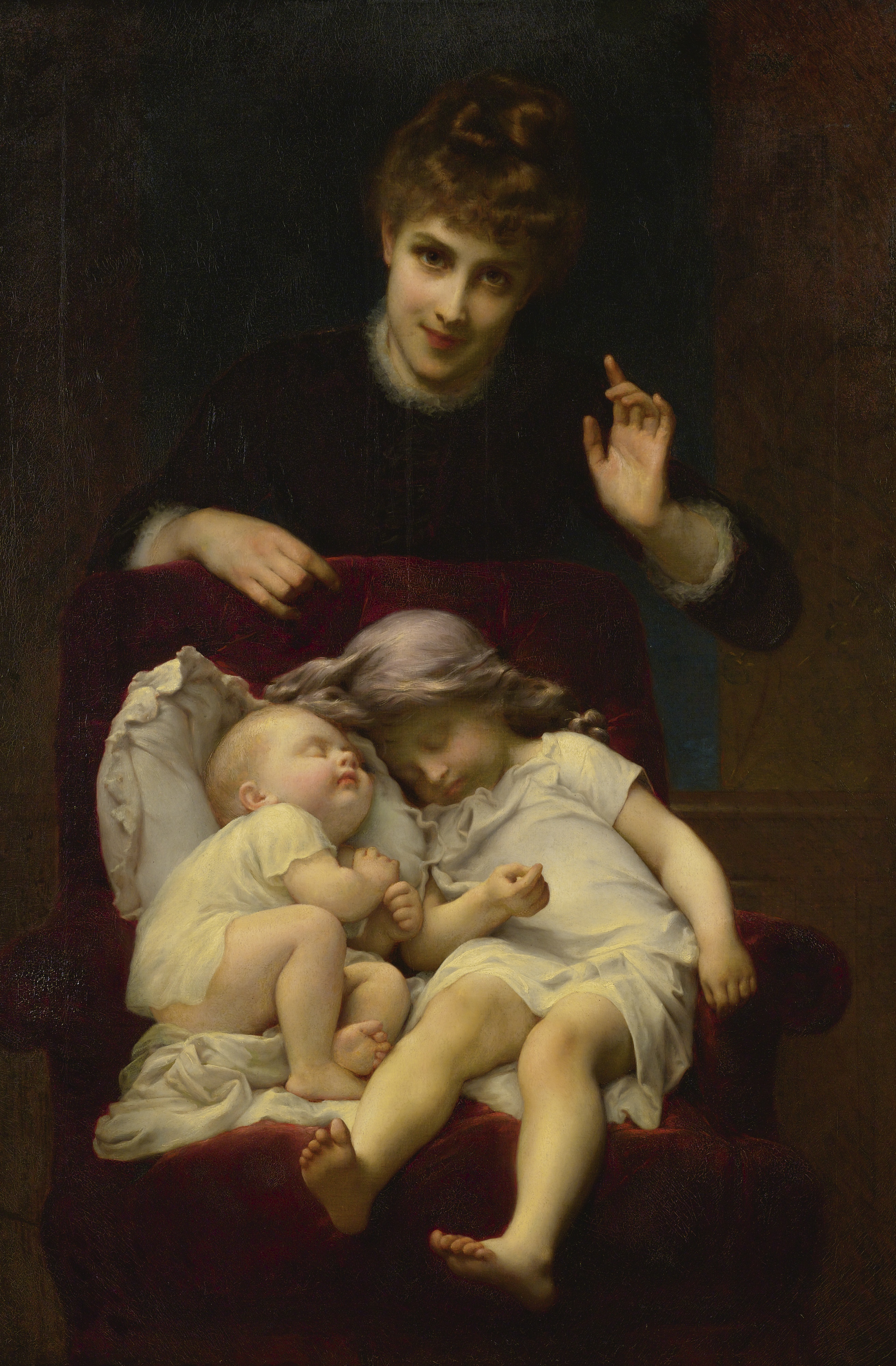
Motherhood

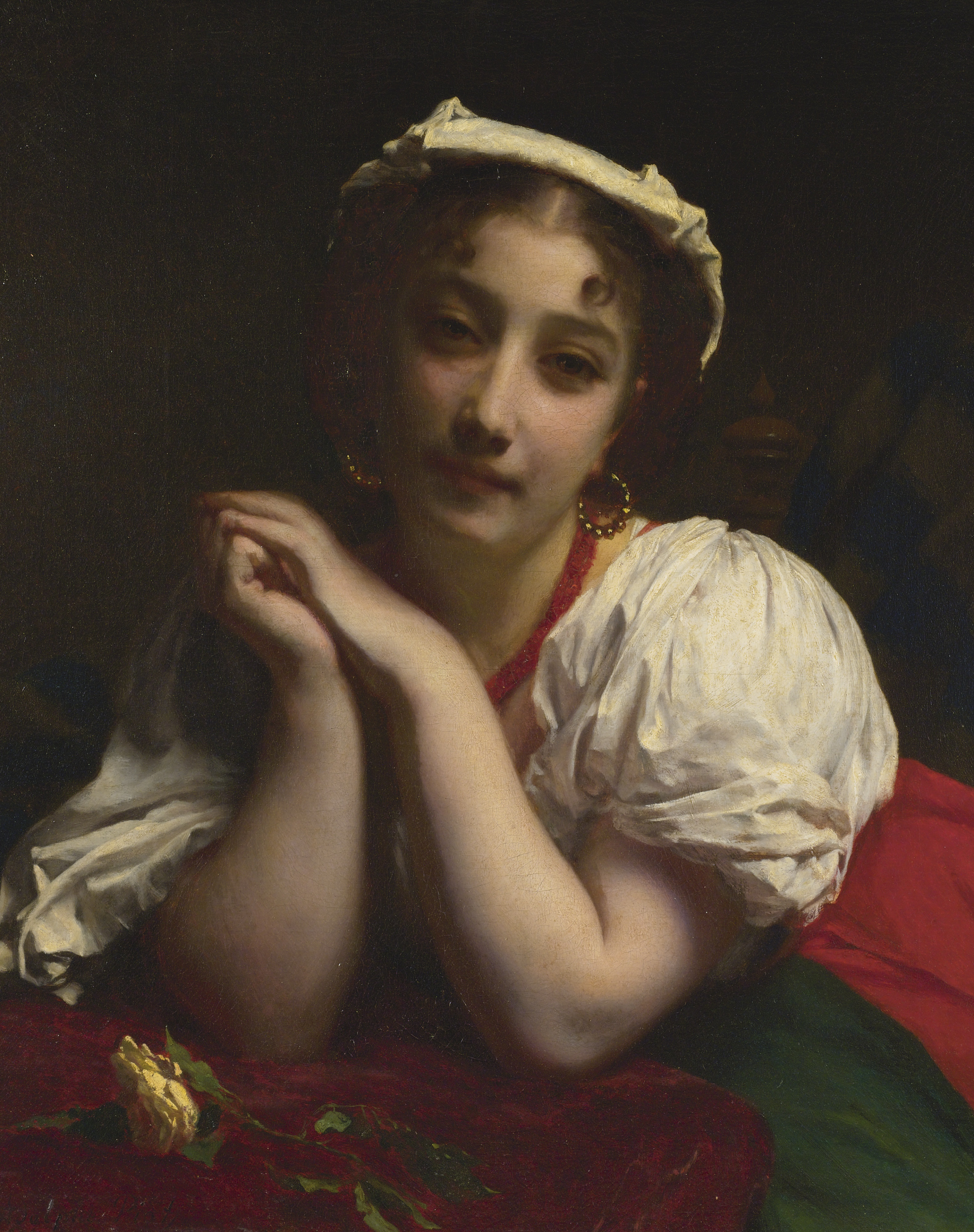
Young Italian Woman

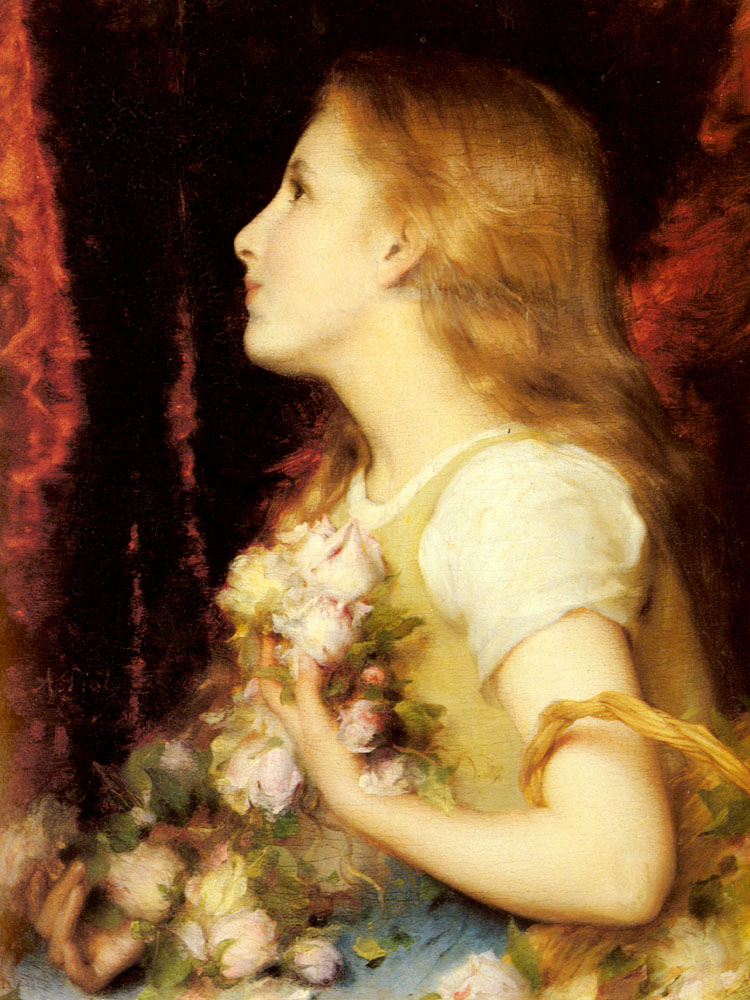
A Young Girl with a Basket of Flowers

== Sources ==
- Art Renewal Center, Etienne Adolphe Piot
- Auvray, Louis (1869), Revue artistique et littéraire (Paris. 1860), Revue artistique et littéraire
- Haynes Fine Art of Broadway, Etienne Adolphe Piot
- Karel, David (1992), "Piot, Adolphe", Dictionnaire des artistes de langue française en Amérique du Nord: peintres, sculpteurs, dessinateurs, graveurs, photographes, et orfèvres, Presses Université Laval, ISBN 978-2-7637-7235-6
- Rehs Galleries, Etienne Adolphe Piot
- The Aldine (1879), "Paris Salon Pictures", The Aldine, 9 (12), Thomas J. Watson Library, The Metropolitan Museum of Art, The Frick Collection: 375–369, JSTOR 20637669
- The Art Journal (1873), "Art in Continental States", The Art Journal, Virtue and Company
