= Saint-Thibault, Cher =

Coordinates: 47°20′17″N 2°51′55″E

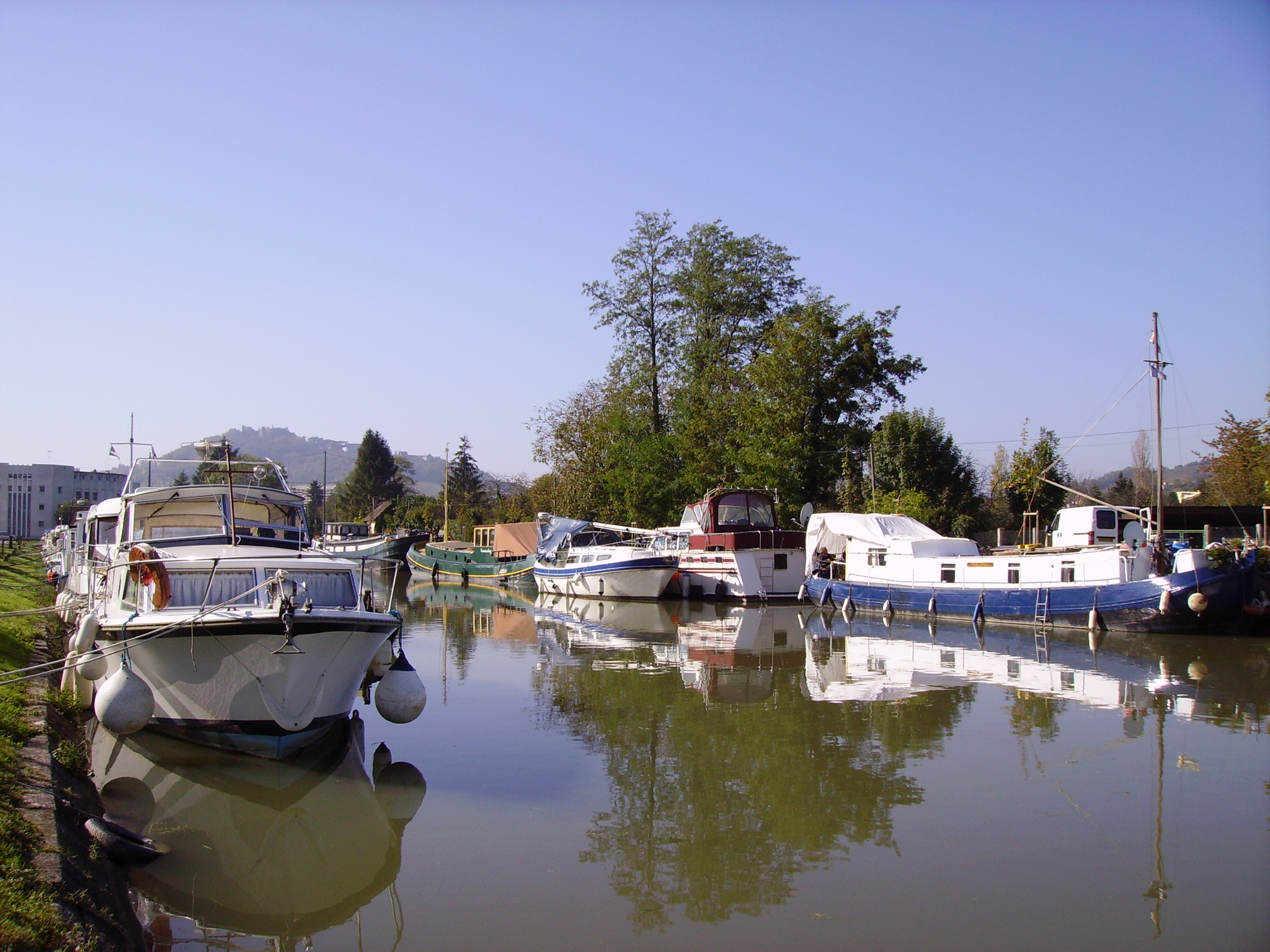
Saint-Thibault (cher) marina

Saint-Thibault-sur-Loire (often named Saint-Thibault) is a village of the Cher département, in central France. It is a former port on the river Loire in the former province of Berry. It is faubourg of the commune Saint-Satur.

== History ==
Located in the area of Gaul settled by the powerful Celtic tribe, the Bituriges, or the "Kings of the World", and after their defeat at Bourges (Avaricum), part of Roman Aquitania. Some evidence points to the existence of an early Roman river town of Gordona (Castle-Gordon), now Saint-Thibault and Saint-Satur; located on the Roman road (Gordaine) from Bourges to the Roman bridge over the Loire river in Saint-Thibault.

Area transportation was improved by the construction of a suspension bridge at Saint-Thibault (1834), the Canal latéral à la Loire (1838) and later, the Bourges - Sancerre - Cosne-sur-Loire railroad line (1885).

During World War II, Saint-Satur was a regional command center for the French Resistance. "Operation Spencer" in 1944 was to prevent the Germans from crossing the Loire River between Gien and Nevers and reinforcing troops in Brittany. The French Resistance and Free French Forces blew up the bridge at Saint-Thibault and sabotaged communication, road and railway lines.
