= Briare aqueduct =

Aqueduct in central France

Pont-canal de Briare
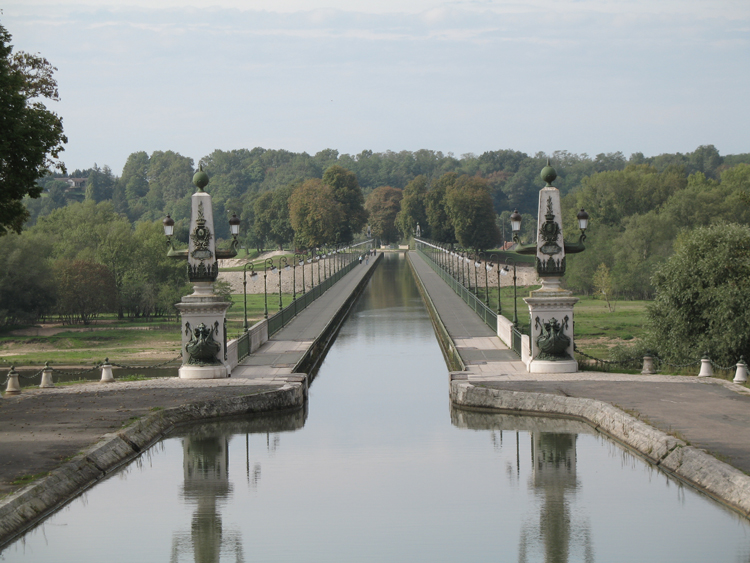
- The Briare Aqueduct
- Coordinates: 47°37′52″N 2°44′10″E
- Carries: Canal latéral à la Loire
- Crosses: Loire
- Locale: Briare

Characteristics
- Trough construction: Steel
- Pier construction: Masonry
- Total length: 662 m.
- Width: 6 m.
- Water depth: 2.2 m.
- Towpaths: Both
- No. of spans: Fifteen

History
- Opened: 1896

Location
- Interactive map of Pont-canal de Briare

The Briare Aqueduct in central France carries the Canal latéral à la Loire over the river Loire on its journey to the Seine. It replaced a river-level crossing from the canal to meet the Briare Canal that was hazardous in times of flood. Between 1896 and 2003 it was the longest navigable aqueduct in the world, until the opening of the Magdeburg Water Bridge.

It is part of the Canal latéral à la Loire, not, as is commonly believed, the Briare Canal.

== History ==
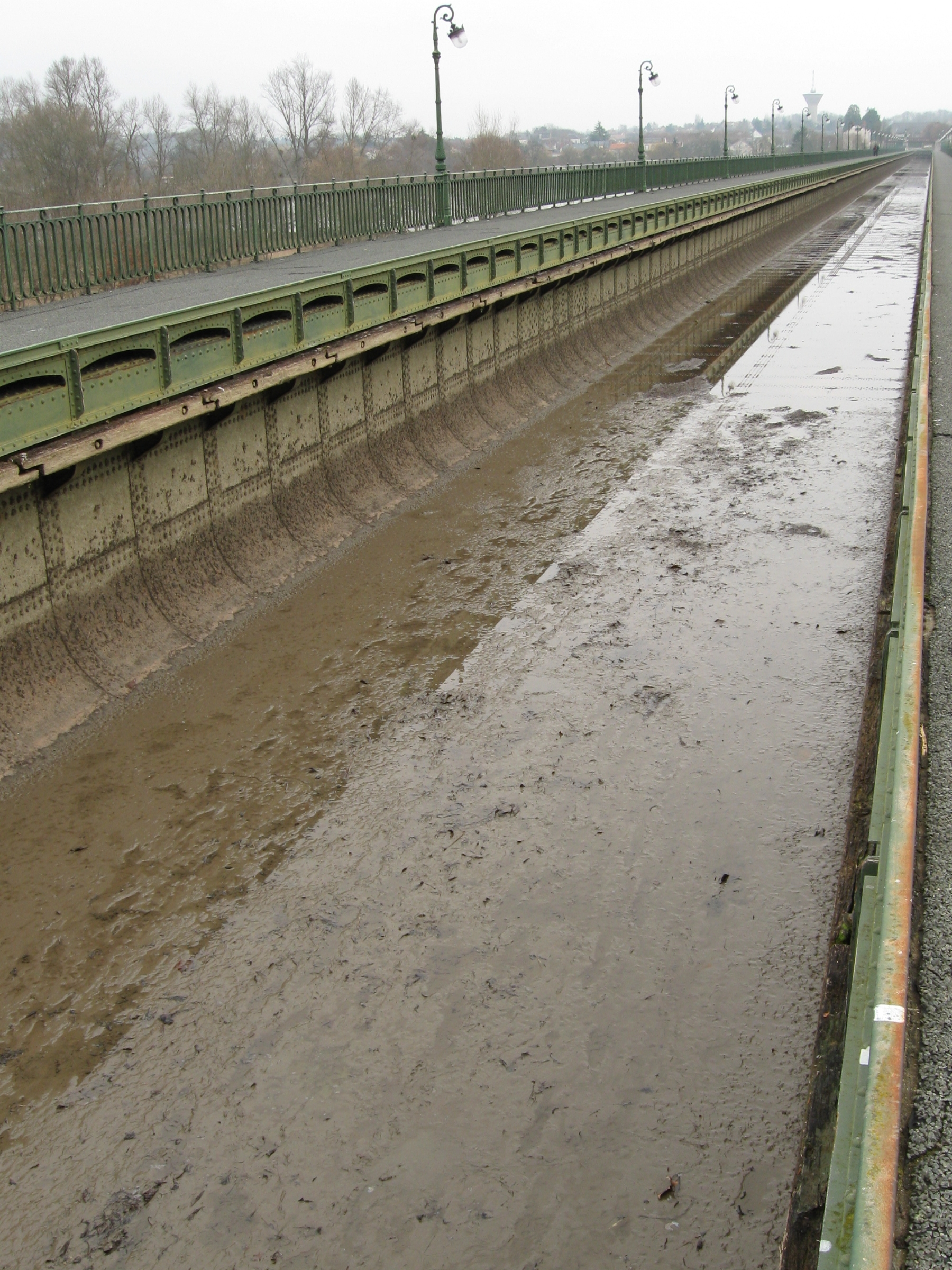
Briare aqueduct whilst drained

The Briare aqueduct near Châtillon-sur-Loire was, for a long time, the longest steel canal aqueduct in the world. The aqueduct is 662 metres long and lost its title of longest aqueduct to the Magdeburg Water Bridge which crosses the Elbe and is 918 metres long. The aqueduct was designed by the engineers Léonce-Abel Mazoyer and Charles Sigault. The masonry abutments and piers were completed between 1890 and 1896 by Gustave Eiffel and the steel channel was completed by Daydé & Pillé of Creil. The aqueduct was inaugurated on 16 September 1896 with the crossing of the boat Aristide, belonging to Ernest Guingamp. It allowed the development of transport to the Freycinet gauge between the Loire and Seine, and is a registered historic monument in France.

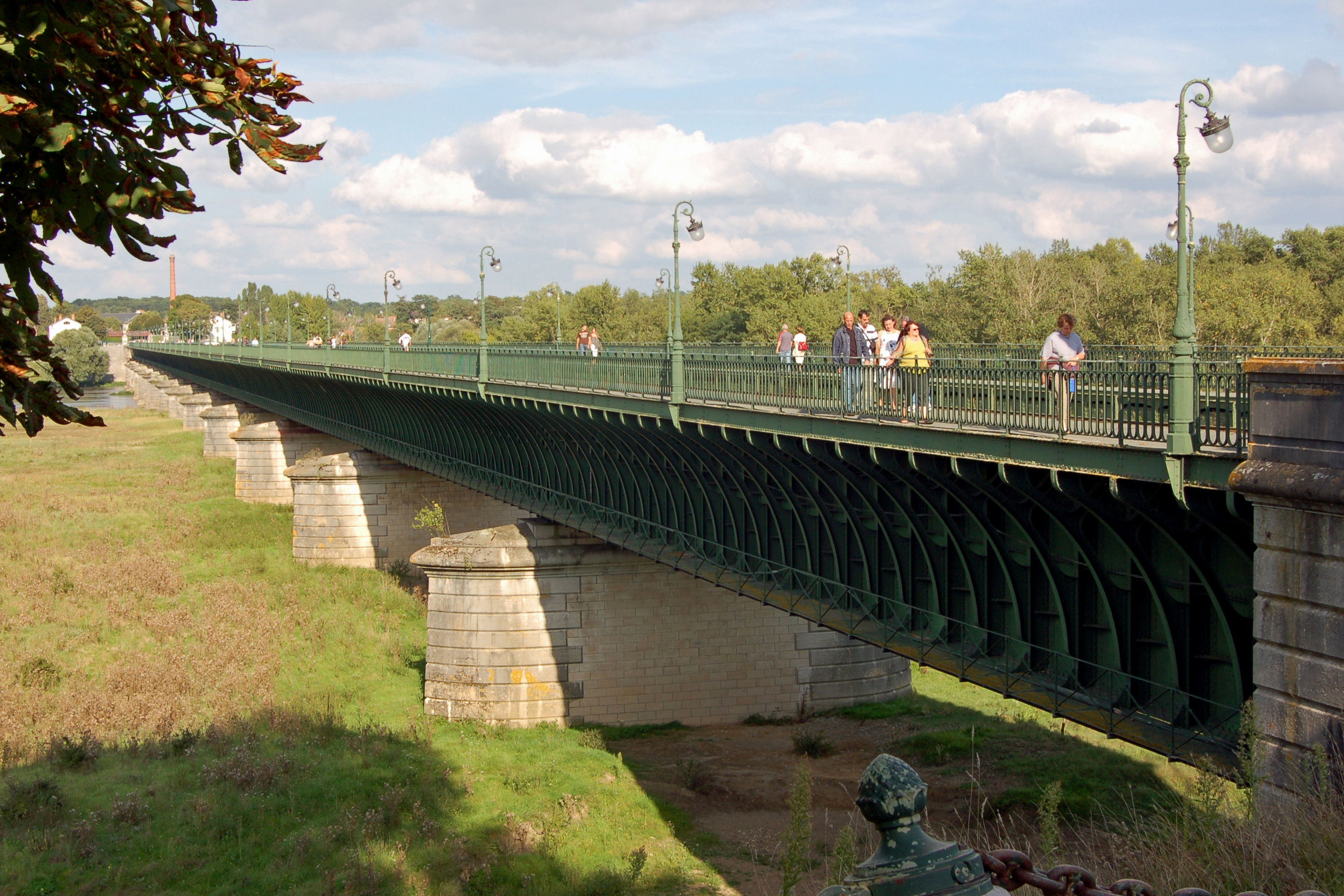
Seen from the west, showing the north side and the structure beneath

The aqueduct is built on fourteen piers. These piers support a single steel beam in turn supporting a steel channel which contains more than 13,000 tonnes of water, 2.2 meters deep and 6 metres wide allowing boats with a 1.8m draught to cross. The width of the aqueduct, towpaths included, is 11.5 meters and its length is 662.7 meters. There is a line of standard lamps on each side of aqueduct. Each end is marked by two ornamental columns in imitation of the Pont Alexandre III in Paris. Eight sluices make it possible to empty the aqueduct in the event of severe freezing.

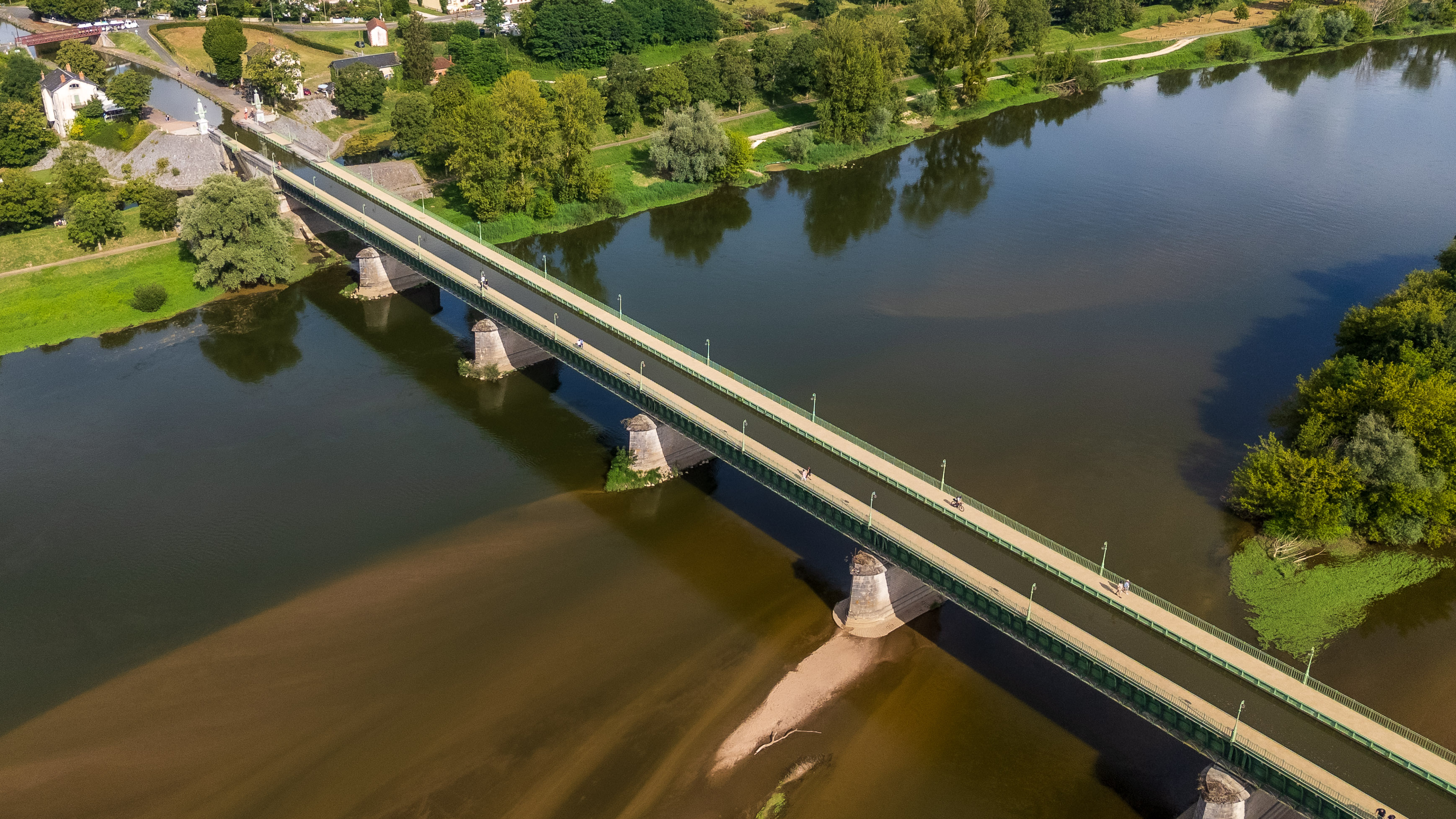
Drone view of the Briare aqueduct

== See also ==
- List of bridges in France
