= Emaux de Briare =

French mosaic company

- Industry: mosaics
- Founded: 1837
- Headquarters: Briare, France (relocated from Paris)
- Key people: Jean-Félix Bapterosses
- Products: buttons, beads, mosaics
- Number of employees: 94 (2009)
- Website: emauxdebriare.com

Emaux de Briare is a French company specializing today in mosaics. Whilst the manufactory in Briare originally started with earthenware pottery, the factory founded in Paris by Jean-Félix Bapterosses (1813–1885) initially began manufacturing porcelain buttons in 1845. They merged in 1851, at which date its international development started: 1851 in The Great Exhibition, UK and as early as 1853 in the United States.

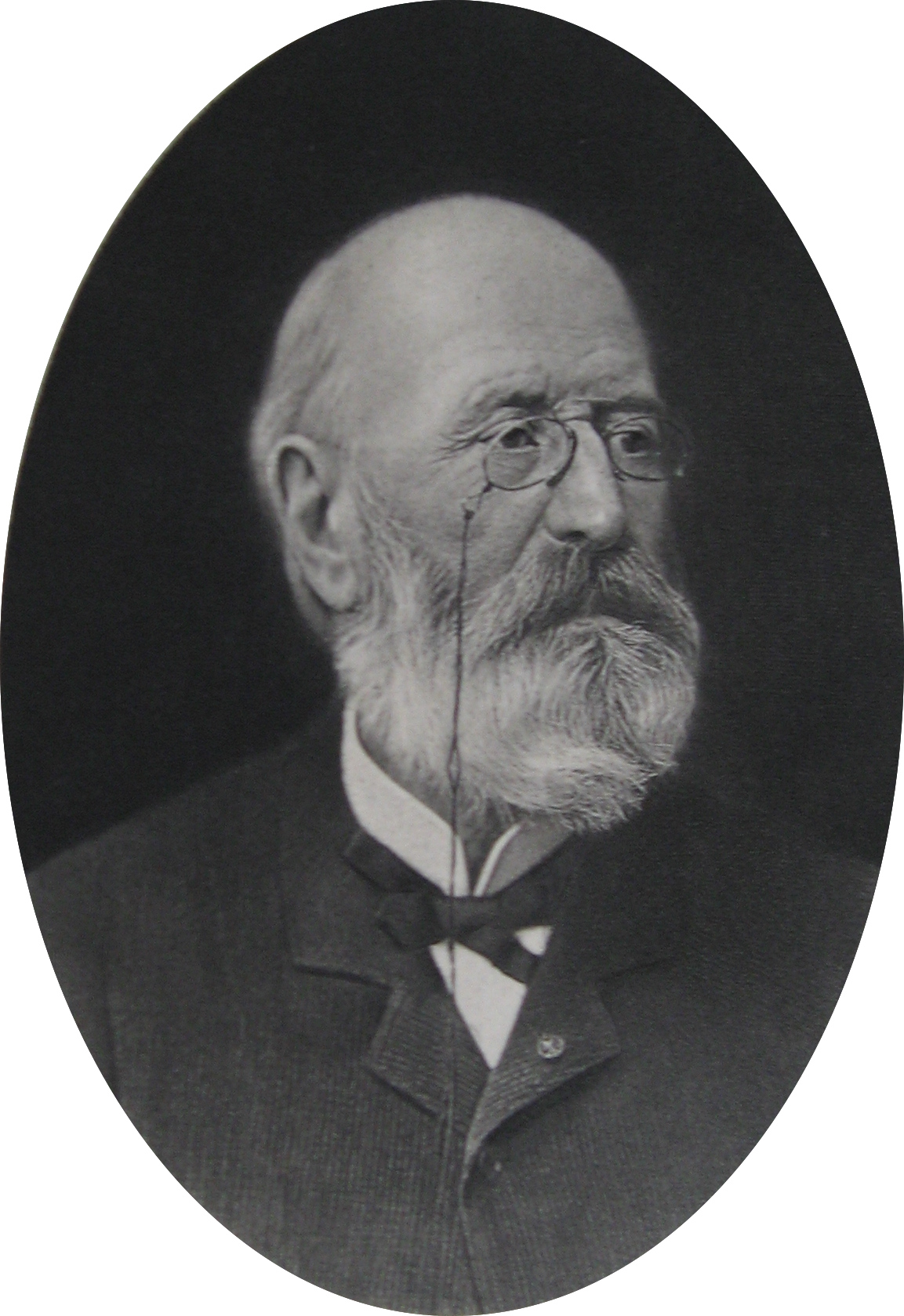
the founder, Jean-Félix Bapterosses

== History ==
=== Early years ===
The company began as Bapterosses & Cie of Paris, France, which was established to manufacture and sell porcelain buttons made according to a method quite similar to the one patented by Richard Prosser in 1840, but following the invention of a device that could mold 500 buttons at a time vs. only one at the competing English factory, Mintons (which had acquired the rights to the original patent) thanks to a new formulation of the paste in which milk was added to the slip to improve plasticity. Jean-Félix Bapterosses was hence named Officer of the French Legion of Honor in 1878. His bust, sculpted by Henri Chapu and founded by Ferdinand Barbedienne is now exhibited in the museum of enamel & mosaics in Briare.

=== Today ===
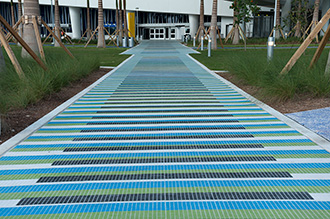
Chromatic Induction in a Double Frequency Marlins Ballpark, Miami, with Briare mosaics.

Today émaux de Briare sells its mosaics across the world for small and large projects alike, one of the latest ones being the walkways for the new Miami Marlins stadium, designed by Venezuelan artist Carlos Cruz-Diez. It currently operates from its US headquarters in Copiague NY for the North American market.

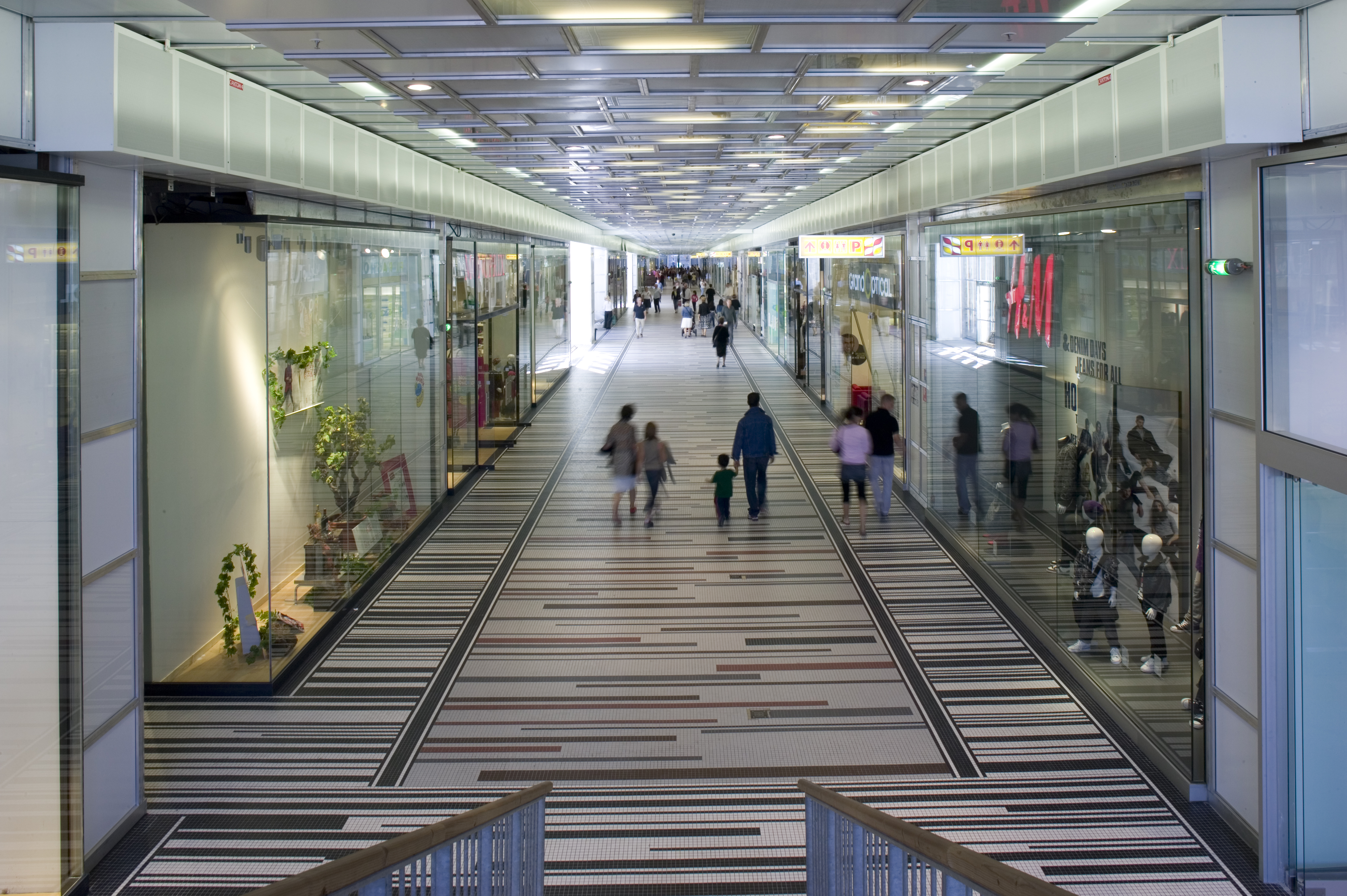
Shopping mall, Angoulême, France / architect: Alexandre Chemetoff.

== Products ==
=== Buttons ===
Bapterosses & Cie was focused on efficiency and multiplied inventions to boost productivity. For instance in 1858 (US letters of patent N°19,120), they invented buttons with shanks. Mr Bapterosses made good use of advertising of his products under the FB brand.

=== Beads ===
With the growing colonial thrust a new market appeared notably in Africa for fancy beads. The models made included faceted beads, mother-of-pearl beads and chevron beads. They were also used for trading with Native Americans in the second half of the 19th century, as well as for the fashion conscious ladies of the time.

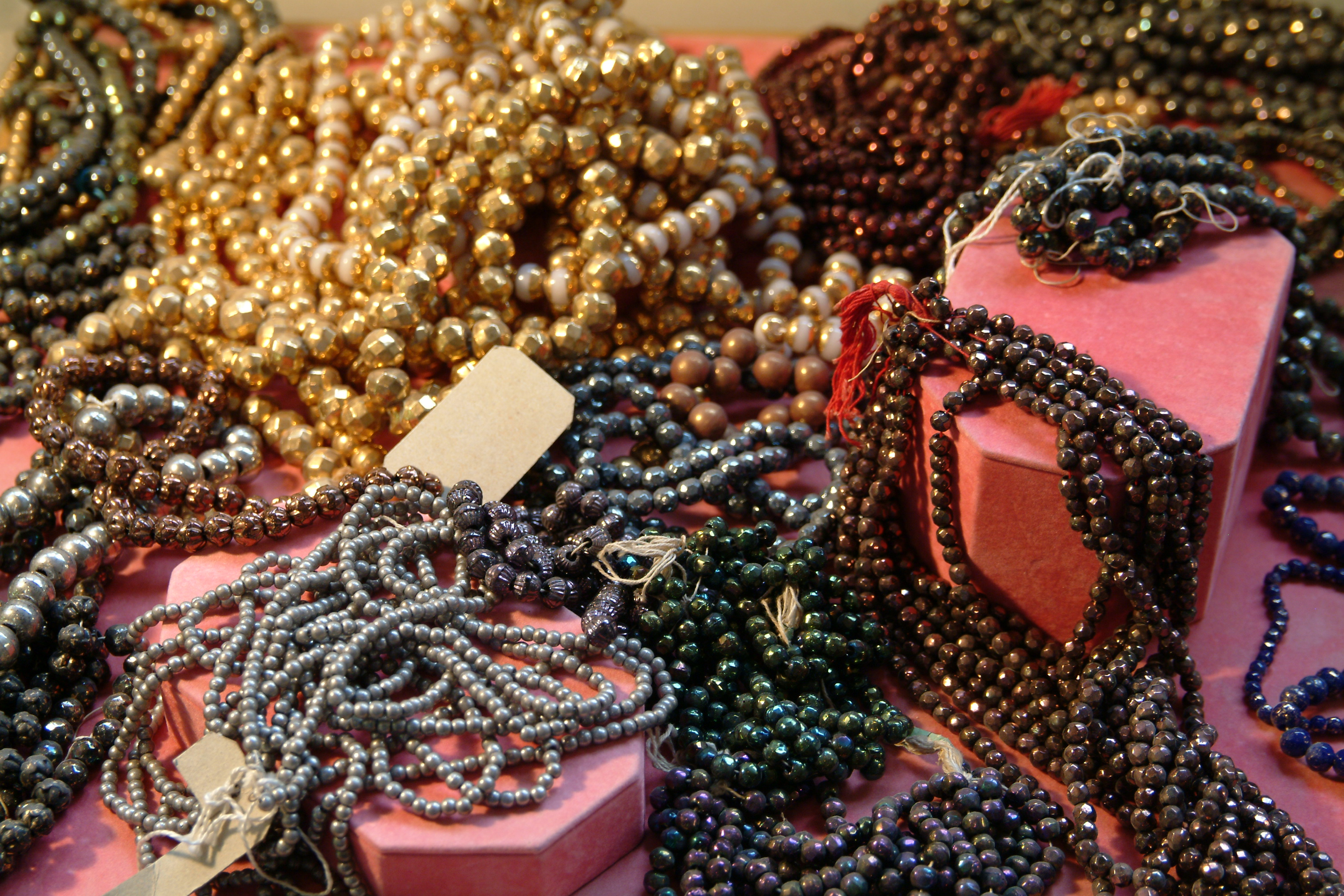
"mother of pearl" type beads in Émaux de Briare

=== Mosaics ===
With the Art Nouveau movement, there was a revival of interest in mosaics. Émaux de Briare introduced a new concept of pre-cut mosaics that would make it much cheaper to adorn buildings, than with the traditional method. When the Art Deco movement came, Emaux de Briare adapted and worked with then trendy architects such as Robert Mallet-Stevens, (bathroom in Villa Cavrois for instance. Later emaux de Briare mosaics were also much used in the Op art movement, notably by Victor Vasarely or Yaacov Agam. Today, Briare mosaics are used by street artists, such as the French Invader.

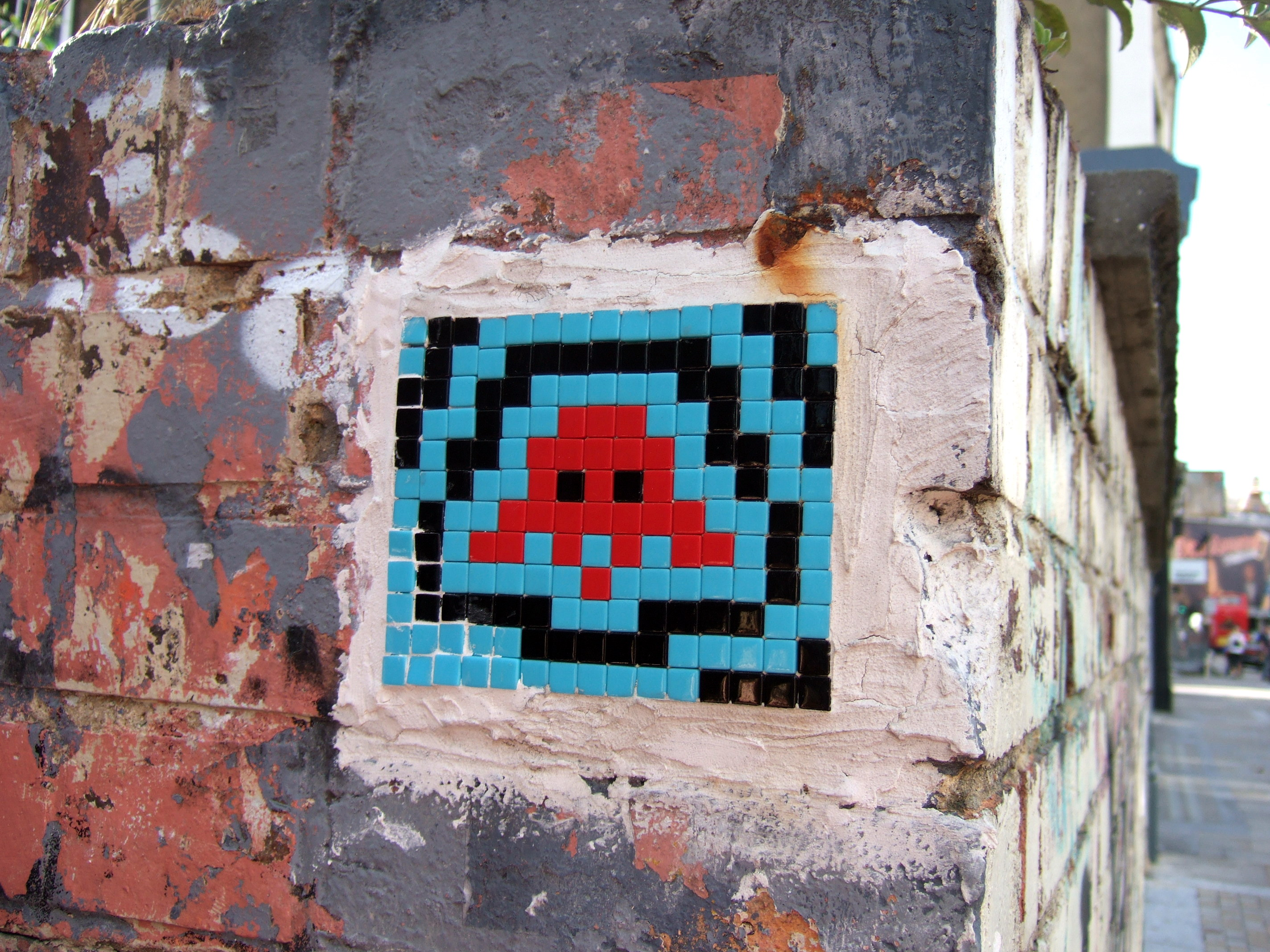
A work by Invader in Emaux de Briare.

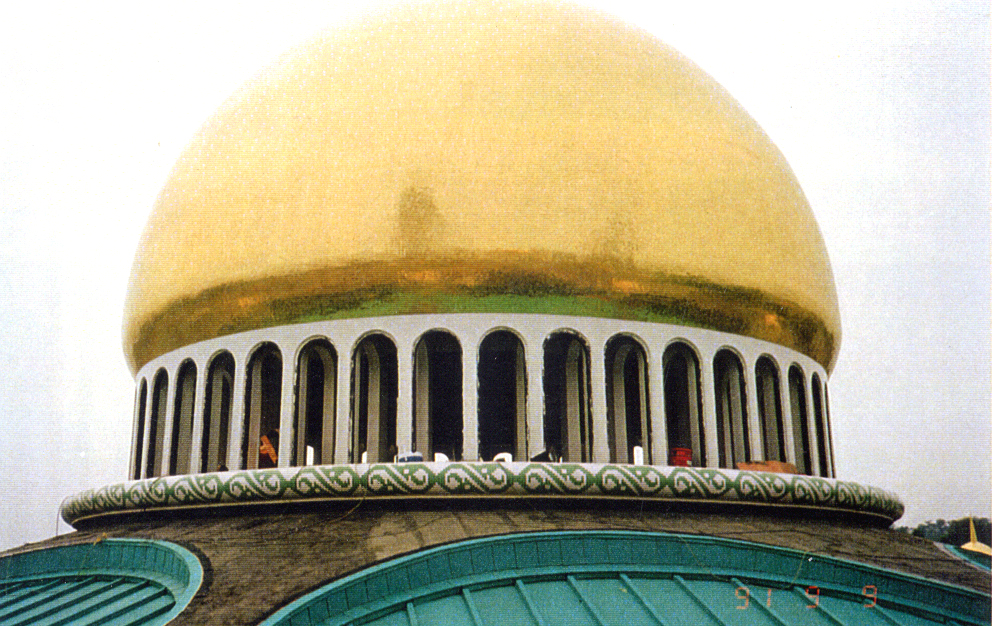
Sultanate of Brunei: Gold mosaics on the domes by Émaux de Briare.

== Markets ==
=== The American market ===
In 1853, the buttons were exhibited in the Exhibition of the Industry of All Nations in New York City. In 1876, beads appeared in the Centennial Exposition in Philadelphia at which time the company was awarded a prize medal. Then in Chicago, in 1893, the mosaics appeared in the World's Columbian Exposition.

The main customers in the latter part of the 19th century were:

- Howard, Sanger Co's dry goods store at 105-107 Chambers Street, New York.
- Louis B. Binsse & Co's fancy goods store at 83 William Street in New York.
- Dieckerhoff, Raffloer at 560 Broadway, New York.
- Ostheimer Bros. in Philadelphia, PA.

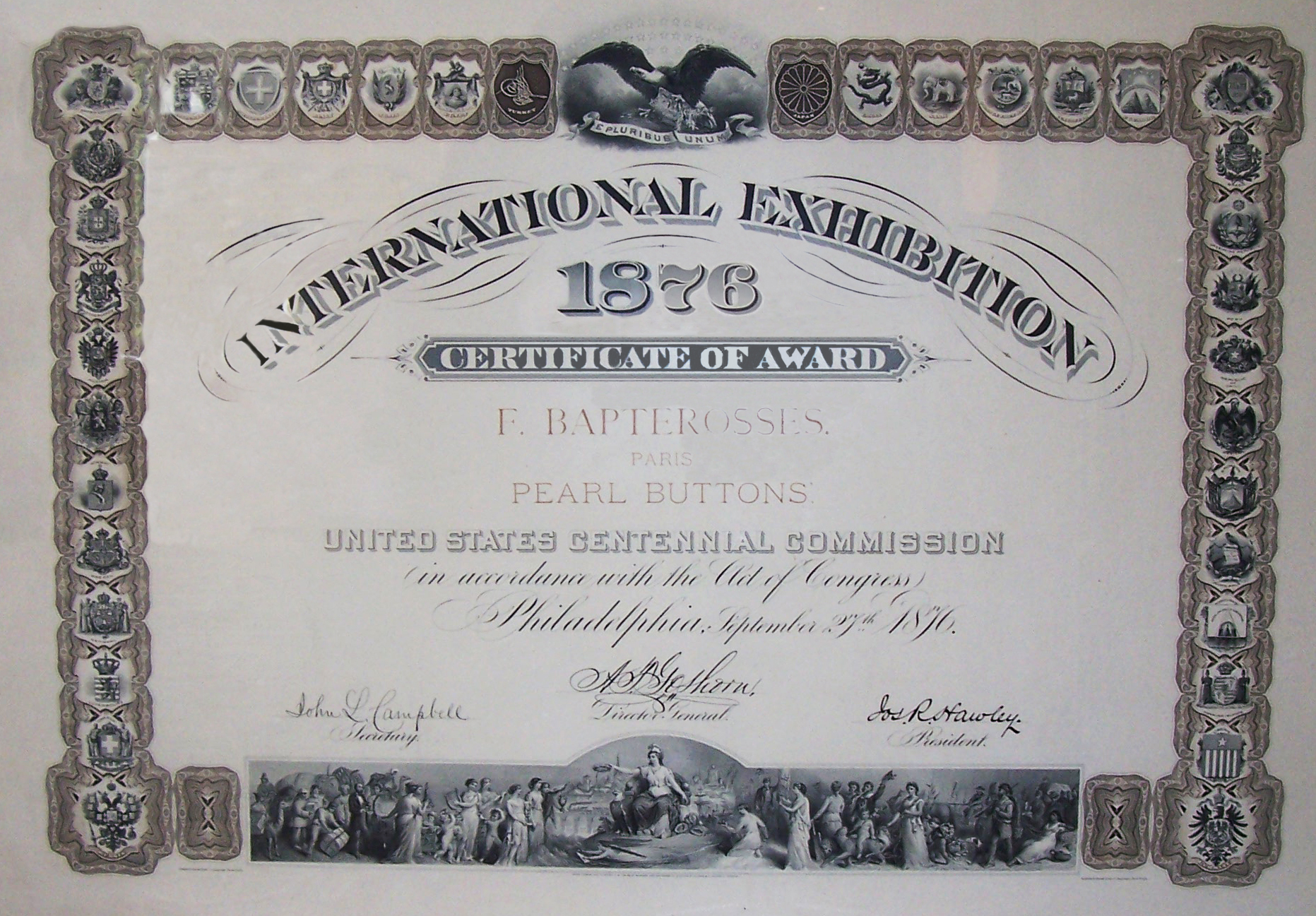
Award, Philadelphia, PA - 1876 for Bapterosses & Cie

=== Other markets ===
Emaux de Briare exhibited in numerous world exhibitions: Paris in 1855, honor medal; London in 1862 « prize medal »; Porto in 1865, "gloria victoribus" medal; Paris in 1867, gold medal and in 1878 Grand Prize; Vienna in 1873, medal; Sydney in 1879; Melbourne in 1880; Amsterdam in 1883, medal; Antwerp in 1885, gold medal; Paris in 1889 « Grand Prize ».

Emaux de Briare beads were especially successful in Africa in the latter part of the 19th century, because of their regular appearance imitating ancient beads.

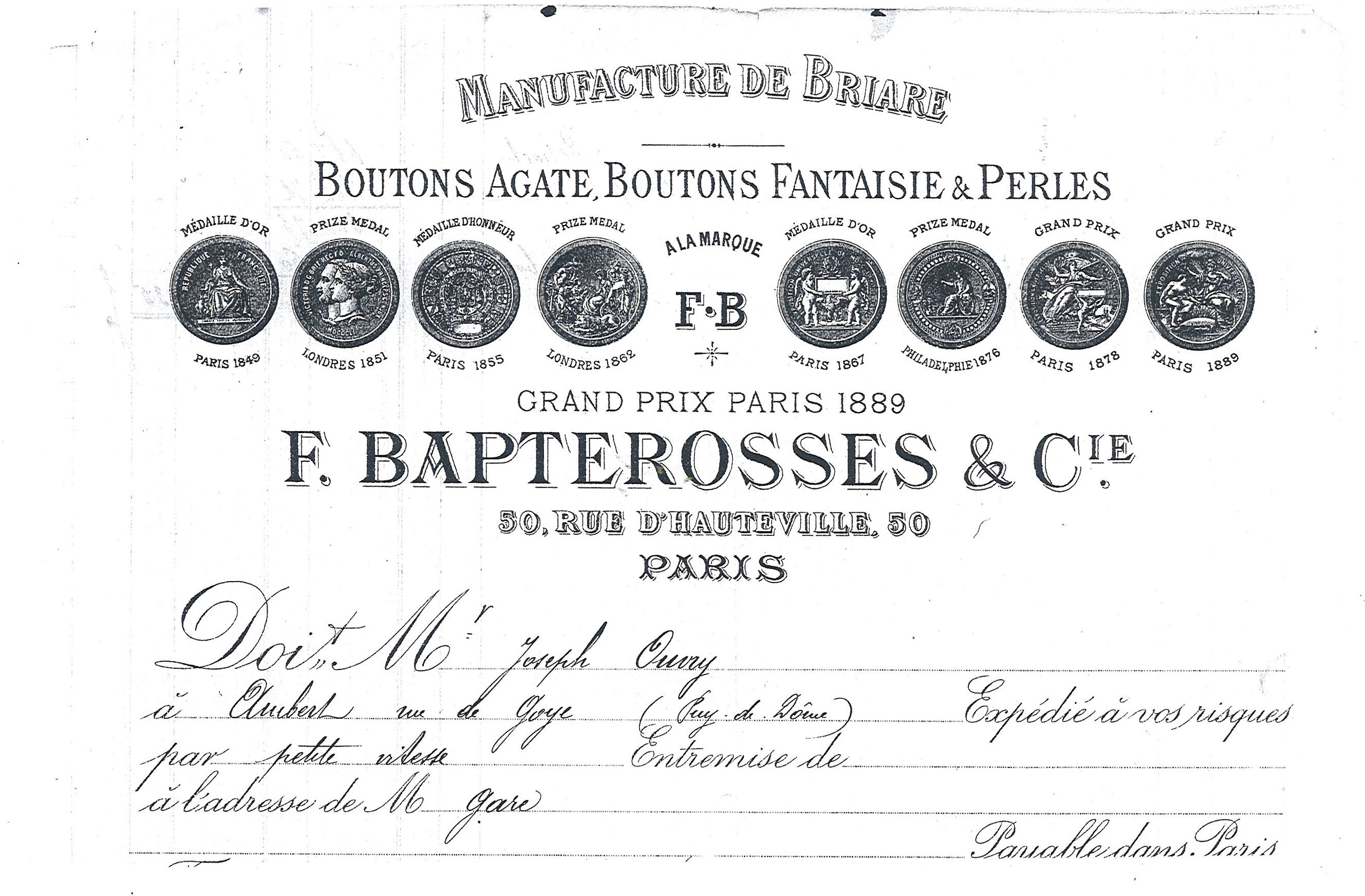
Prizes & medals awarded to Bapterosses & Cie (1849-1889)
