= L'Etang =

Coordinates: 47.55938°N 2.80349°E

L'Etang (French pronunciation: [letɑ̃]) is a village in the Loiret department, in central France. It is a part of the commune of Beaulieu-sur-Loire.

== See also ==
- Communes of the Loiret department
