= Digoin =

- Commune
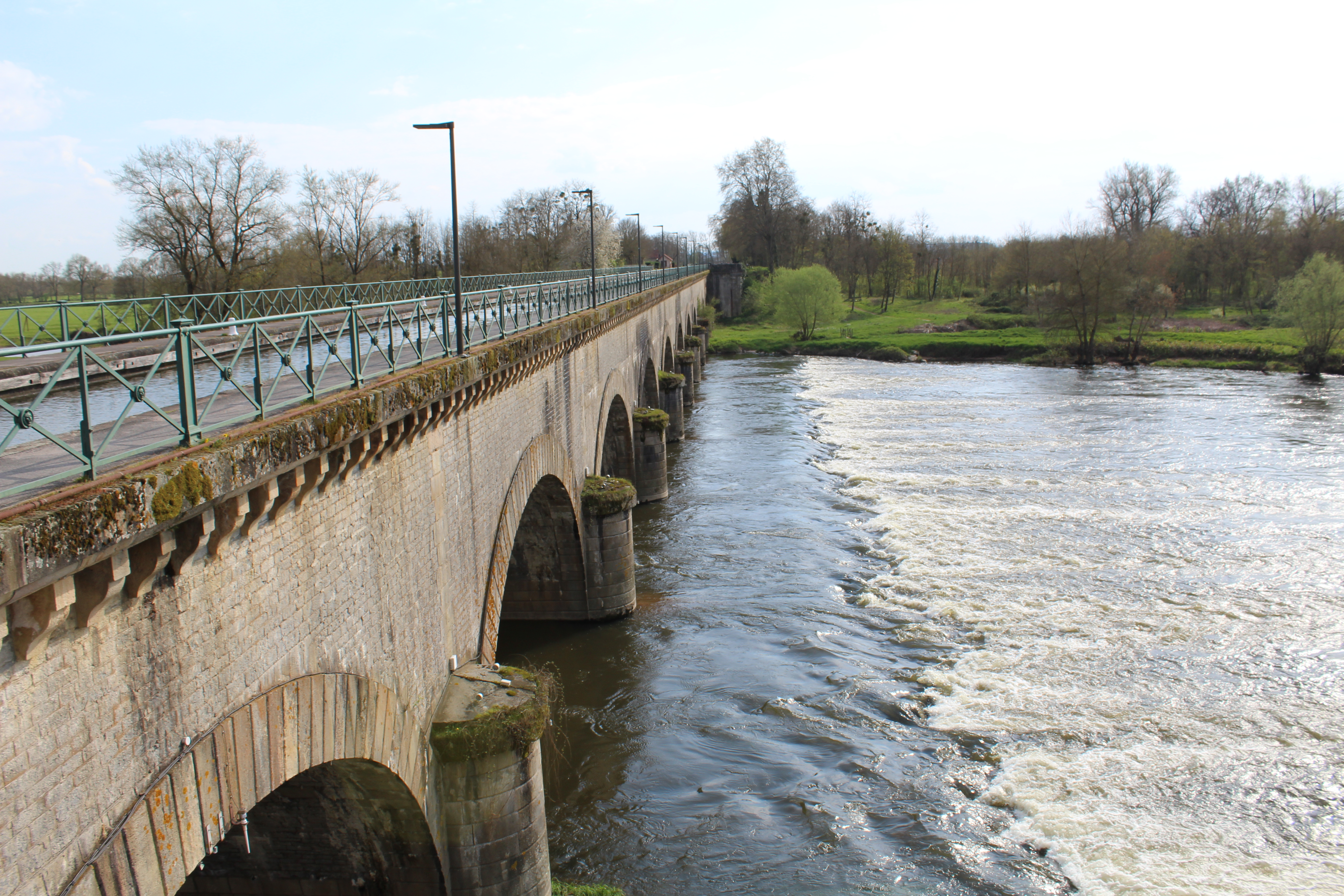
- Water bridge on the Loire near Digoin

- Coat of arms
- Location of Digoin
- Location within France Location within Bourgogne-Franche-Comté
- Coordinates: 46°28′58″N 3°58′53″E
- Country: France
- Region: Bourgogne-Franche-Comté
- Department: Saône-et-Loire
- Arrondissement: Charolles
- Canton: Digoin

Government
  - Mayor (2020–2026): David Beme
- Area^{1}: 34.72 km^{2} (13.41 sq mi)
- Elevation: 233 m (764 ft)
- Highest elevation: 306 m (1,004 ft)
- Lowest elevation: 222 m (728 ft)
- Population (2023): 7,353
  - Density: 211.8/km^{2} (548.5/sq mi)
- Time zone: UTC+01:00 (CET)
  - Summer (DST): UTC+02:00 (CEST)
- INSEE/Postal code: 71176 /71160
- ^{1} French Land Register data, which excludes lakes, ponds, glaciers > 1 km^{2} (0.386 sq mi or 247 acres) and river estuaries.

Digoin (French pronunciation: [diɡwɛ̃]) is a commune in the Saône-et-Loire department in the region of Bourgogne-Franche-Comté in eastern France.

The junction of the Canal du Centre and the Canal latéral à la Loire is near Digoin.

== Geography ==
The river Bourbince flows into the Arroux in Digoin, while the Arroux flows into the Loire near Digoin.

== Population ==
Historical population
Year	Pop.	±% p.a.
1968	10,050	—
1975	11,093	+1.42%
1982	11,008	−0.11%
1990	10,032	−1.15%
1999	8,947	−1.26%
2007	8,493	−0.65%
2012	8,119	−0.90%
2017	7,817	−0.76%
2023	7,353	−1.01%
Source: INSEE

== Sights ==
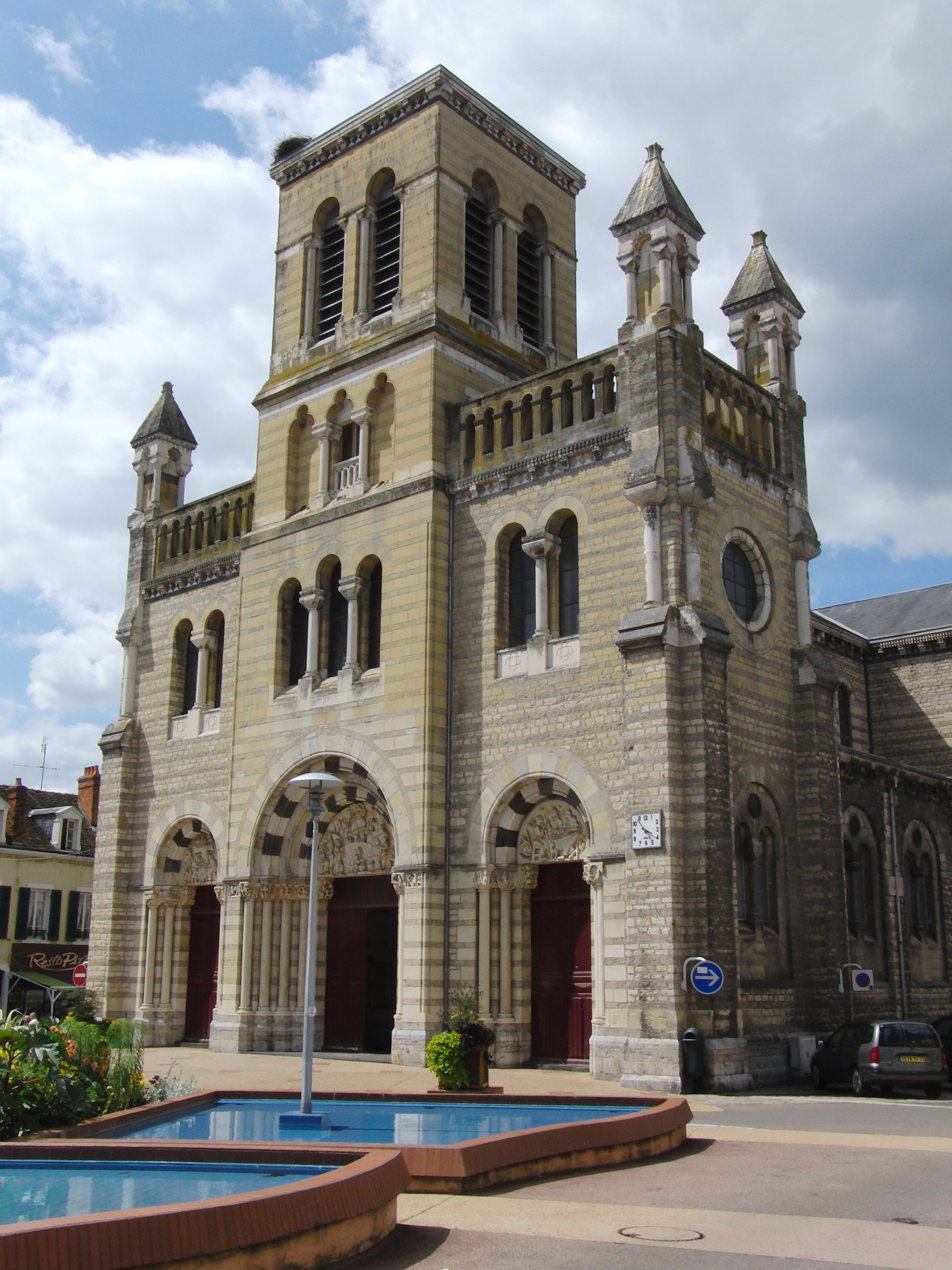
Church of Notre-Dame de la Providence

== Personalities ==
- Adolphe Piot (c. 1825 – c. 1910), French painter
- Alain Robert (born 1962), French rock climber and urban climber
- Étienne Maynaud de Bizefranc de Laveaux (1751–1828), French general and Governor of Saint-Domingue

== See also ==
- Communes of the Saône-et-Loire department
