= Marseilles-lès-Aubigny =

- Commune
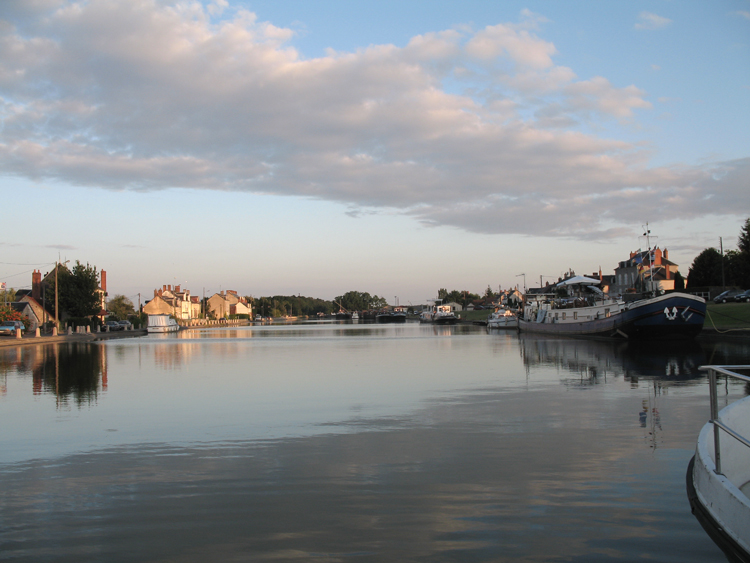
- Loire lateral canal
- Location of Marseilles-lès-Aubigny
- Location within France Location within Centre-Val de Loire
- Coordinates: 47°04′06″N 3°00′50″E
- Country: France
- Region: Centre-Val de Loire
- Department: Cher
- Arrondissement: Bourges
- Canton: Avord

Government
  - Mayor (2020–2026): Sylvie Mouton
- Area^{1}: 9.88 km^{2} (3.81 sq mi)
- Elevation: 180 m (590 ft)
- Highest elevation: 198 m (650 ft)
- Lowest elevation: 157 m (515 ft)
- Population (2023): 645
  - Density: 65.3/km^{2} (169/sq mi)
- Time zone: UTC+01:00 (CET)
  - Summer (DST): UTC+02:00 (CEST)
- INSEE/Postal code: 18139 /18320
- ^{1} French Land Register data, which excludes lakes, ponds, glaciers > 1 km^{2} (0.386 sq mi or 247 acres) and river estuaries.

Marseilles-lès-Aubigny (French pronunciation: [maʁsɛj lɛ.z‿obiɲi]) is a commune in the Cher department in the Centre-Val de Loire region of France.

== Geography ==
A forestry and farming area comprising the village and several hamlets situated by the banks of the rivers Aubois and Loire, some 25 miles (40 km) east of Bourges, at the junction of the D44 and the D81 roads. The commune has a small port on the Loire lateral canal. There is a canal boatyard with dry dock in the basin. The village grew up because of the canal traffic. The junction of the Canal Lateral a la Loire, a through route from the Channel to the Mediterranean, with the Canal de Berry. The canal de Berry was a small scale canal and goods needed transferring from the larger Freycinet size peniches used on the Canal de Berry to the smaller Berrichon peniches. It ran from this village to join the Loire at Tours.

== Population ==
Historical population
Year	Pop.	±% p.a.
1968	963	—
1975	917	−0.70%
1982	876	−0.65%
1990	802	−1.10%
1999	691	−1.64%
2007	685	−0.11%
2012	664	−0.62%
2017	657	−0.21%
2023	645	−0.31%
Source: INSEE

== Sights ==
- The church, dating from the twentieth century.
- A museum.
- The ruins of a feudal castle.

== See also ==
- Communes of the Cher department
