= Saint-Léger-sur-Dheune =

- Commune
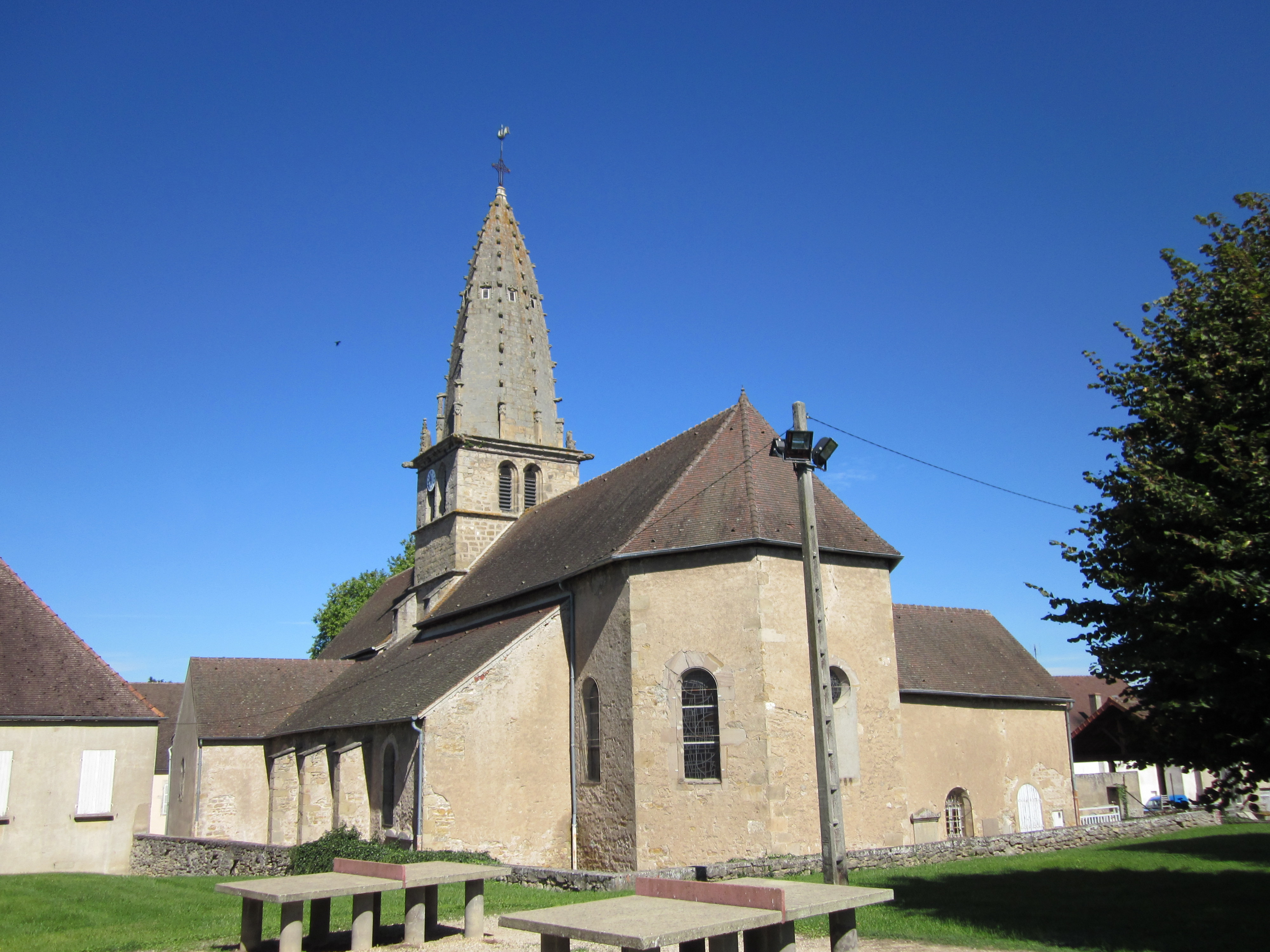
- The church in Saint-Léger-sur-Dheune

- Coat of arms
- Location of Saint-Léger-sur-Dheune
- Location within France Location within Bourgogne-Franche-Comté
- Coordinates: 46°50′48″N 4°38′13″E
- Country: France
- Region: Bourgogne-Franche-Comté
- Department: Saône-et-Loire
- Arrondissement: Chalon-sur-Saône
- Canton: Chagny
- Intercommunality: CA Le Grand Chalon

Government
  - Mayor (2026–32): Consiglia Dubois
- Area^{1}: 12.16 km^{2} (4.70 sq mi)
- Elevation: 264 m (866 ft)
- Highest elevation: 477 m (1,565 ft)
- Lowest elevation: 227 m (745 ft)
- Population (2023): 1,533
  - Density: 126.1/km^{2} (326.5/sq mi)
- Time zone: UTC+01:00 (CET)
  - Summer (DST): UTC+02:00 (CEST)
- INSEE/Postal code: 71442 /71510
- ^{1} French Land Register data, which excludes lakes, ponds, glaciers > 1 km^{2} (0.386 sq mi or 247 acres) and river estuaries.

Saint-Léger-sur-Dheune (French pronunciation: [sɛ̃ leʒe syʁ dœn], literally Saint-Léger on Dheune) is a commune in the Saône-et-Loire department in the region of Bourgogne-Franche-Comté in eastern France.

== Geography ==
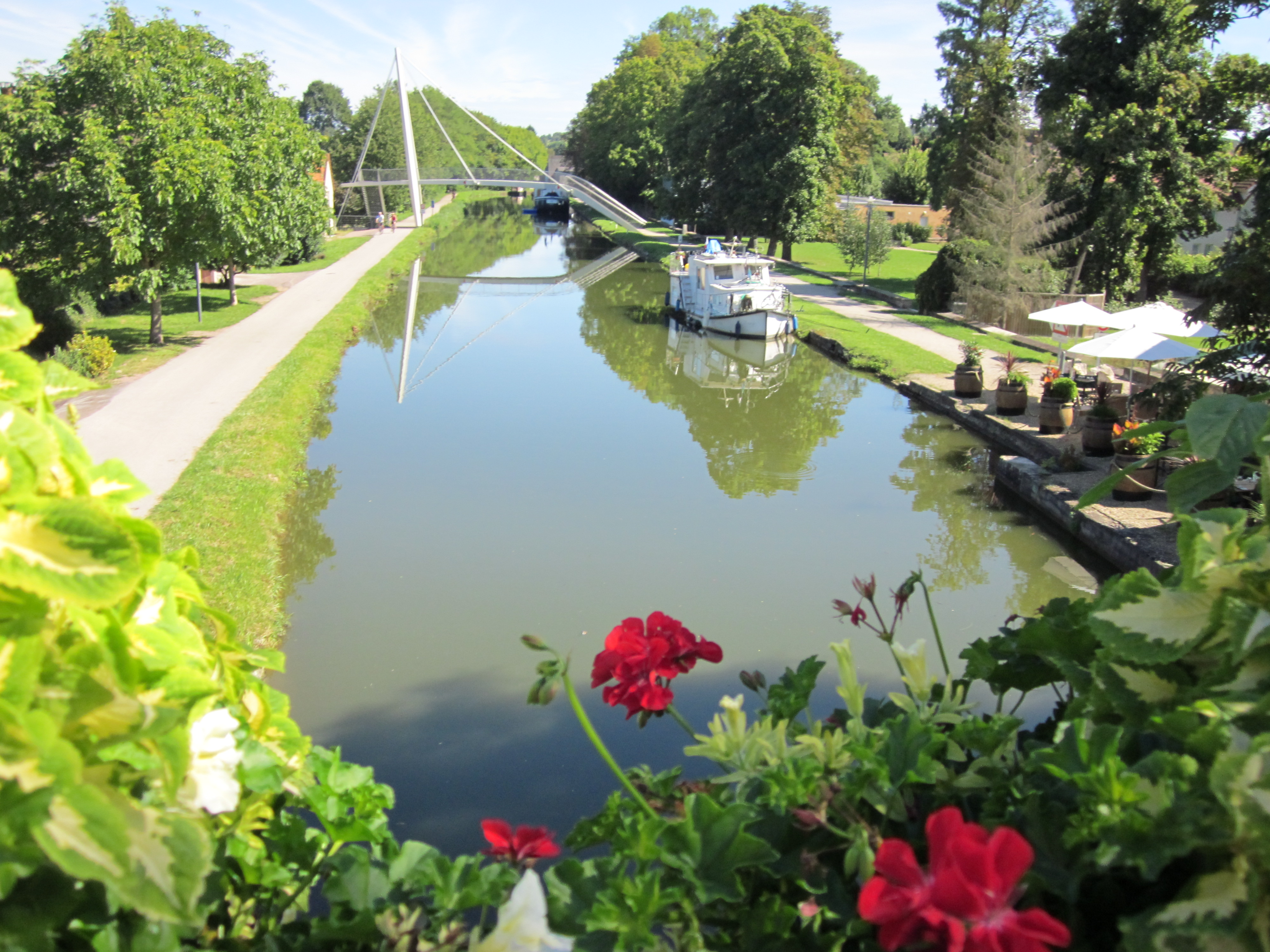
Canal du Centre

The river Dheune and the Canal du Centre pass through the village.

== See also ==
- Communes of the Saône-et-Loire department
