= Cuffy, Cher =

Cuffy
- Commune
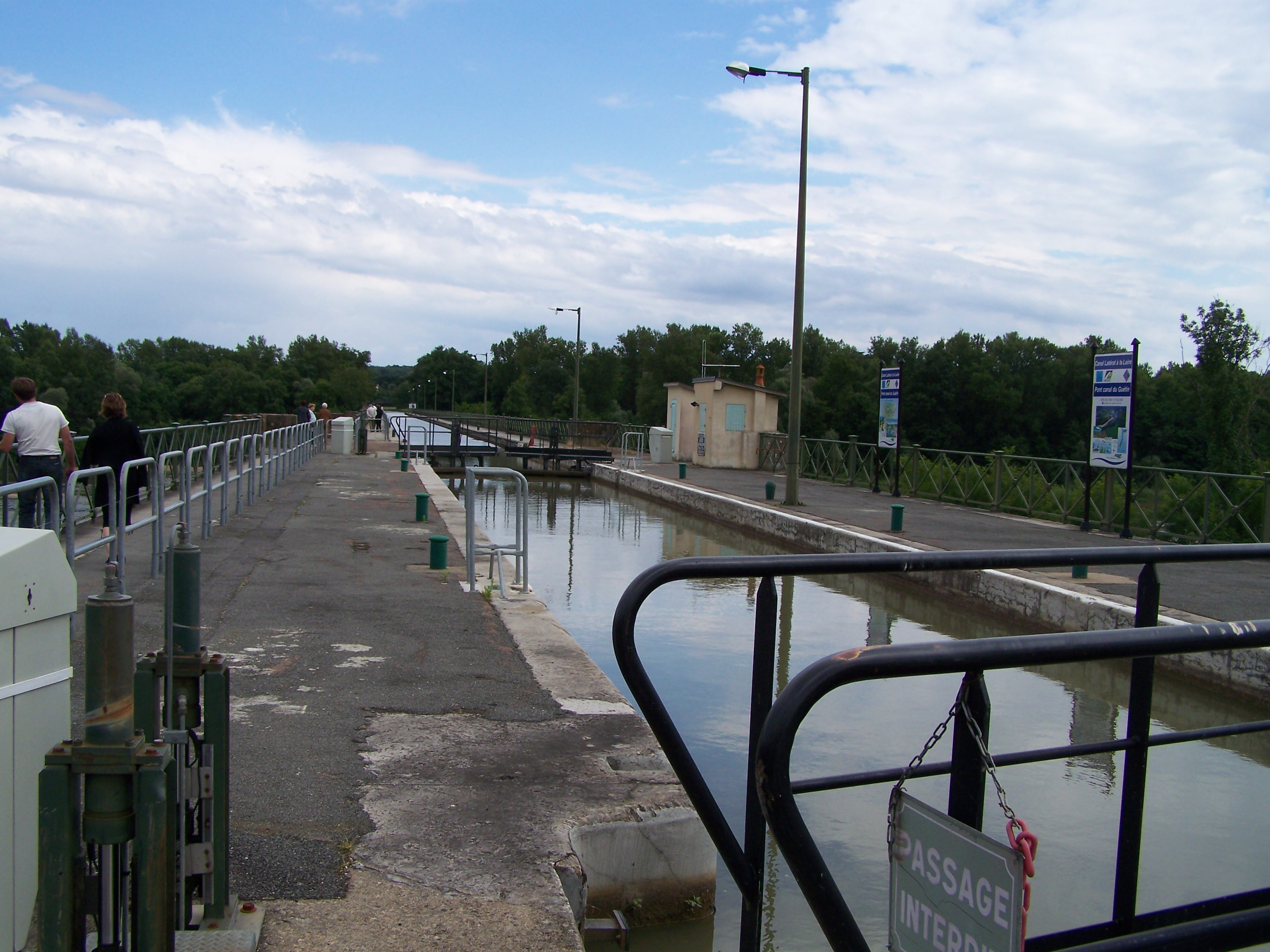
- The Guétin Canal aqueduct
- Location of Cuffy
- Location within France Location within Centre-Val de Loire
- Coordinates: 46°57′42″N 3°03′12″E
- Country: France
- Region: Centre-Val de Loire
- Department: Cher
- Arrondissement: Saint-Amand-Montrond
- Canton: La Guerche-sur-l'Aubois

Government
  - Mayor (2020–2026): Olivier Hurabielle
- Area^{1}: 34.57 km^{2} (13.35 sq mi)
- Highest elevation: 210 m (690 ft)
- Lowest elevation: 166 m (545 ft)
- Population (2023): 1,020
  - Density: 29.5/km^{2} (76.4/sq mi)
- Time zone: UTC+01:00 (CET)
  - Summer (DST): UTC+02:00 (CEST)
- INSEE/Postal code: 18082 /18150
- ^{1} French Land Register data, which excludes lakes, ponds, glaciers > 1 km^{2} (0.386 sq mi or 247 acres) and river estuaries.

Cuffy (French pronunciation: [kyfi]) is a commune in the Cher department in the Centre-Val de Loire region of France.

== Geography ==
An area of farming and forestry comprising the village and several hamlets situated by the banks of the Loire and Loire Lateral Canal, the river Allier and the small river Canche, some 33 miles (53 km) east of Bourges at the junction of the D45 with the D50e, D178 and D976 roads.

== Population ==
Historical population
Year	Pop.	±% p.a.
1968	835	—
1975	798	−0.65%
1982	871	+1.26%
1990	968	+1.33%
1999	996	+0.32%
2007	1,108	+1.34%
2012	1,109	+0.02%
2017	1,075	−0.62%
2023	1,020	−0.87%
Source: INSEE

== Sights ==
- The church of St. Maurice, dating from the twelfth century.
- The ruins of a fourteenth-century motte and bailey castle.
- The 470 metres (1,540 ft) aqueduct of the Canal latéral à la Loire with 18 arches.

== See also ==
- Communes of the Cher department
