= Briare =

- Commune
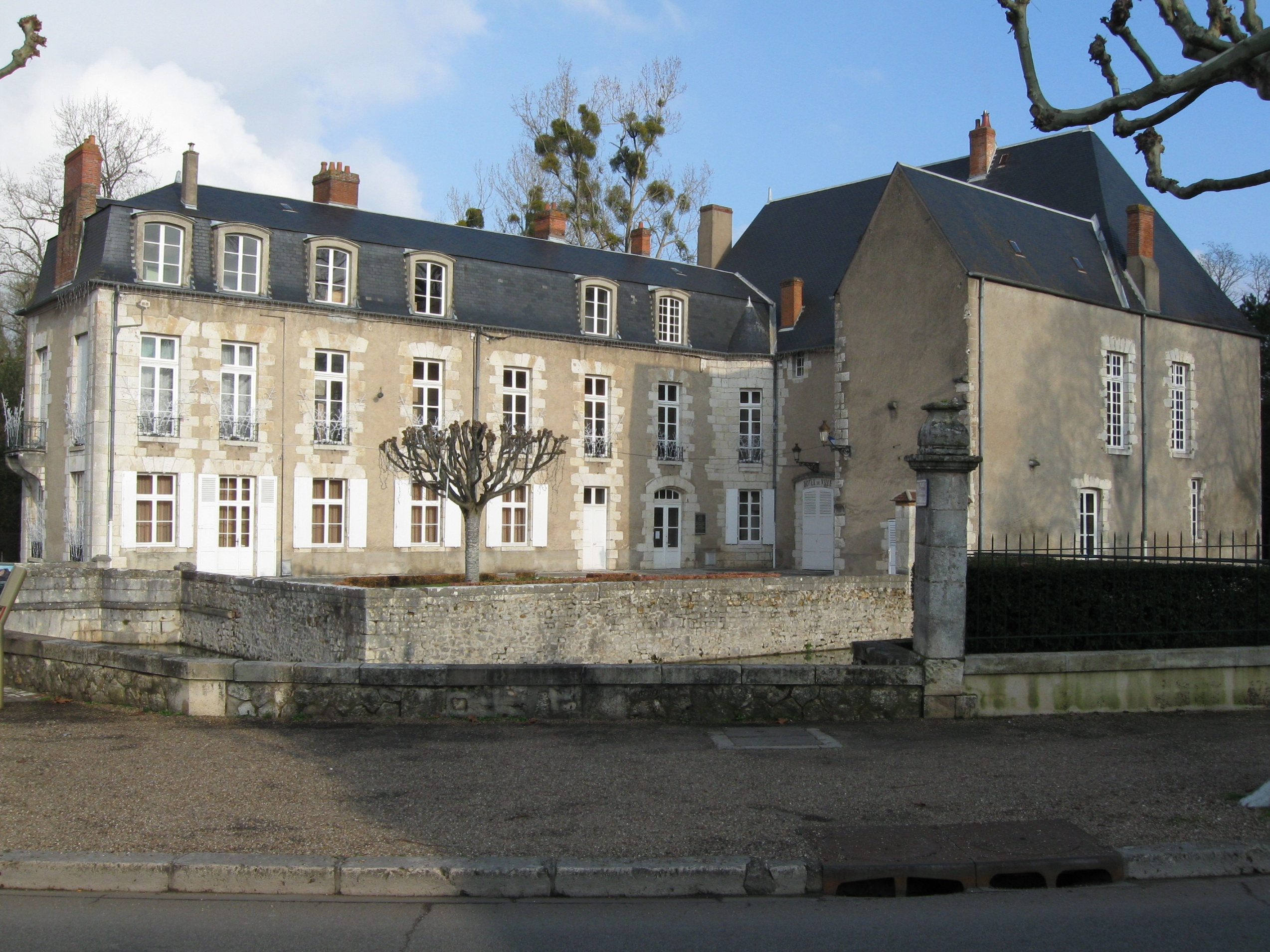
- Town hall

- Coat of arms
- Location of Briare
- Location within France Location within Centre-Val de Loire
- Coordinates: 47°38′20″N 2°44′24″E
- Country: France
- Region: Centre-Val de Loire
- Department: Loiret
- Arrondissement: Montargis
- Canton: Gien

Government
  - Mayor (2020–2026): Pierre-François Bouguet
- Area^{1}: 45.41 km^{2} (17.53 sq mi)
- Elevation: 144 m (472 ft)
- Highest elevation: 189 m (620 ft)
- Lowest elevation: 122 m (400 ft)
- Population (2023): 4,911
  - Density: 108.1/km^{2} (280.1/sq mi)
- Time zone: UTC+01:00 (CET)
  - Summer (DST): UTC+02:00 (CEST)
- INSEE/Postal code: 45053 /45250
- ^{1} French Land Register data, which excludes lakes, ponds, glaciers > 1 km^{2} (0.386 sq mi or 247 acres) and river estuaries.

Briare (French pronunciation: [bʁijaʁ], also known as Briare-le-Canal) is a commune in the Loiret department in north-central France, in the historical region of Puisaye. The composer and organist Henri Nibelle (1883–1967) was born in Briare.

Briare, the Brivodorum of the Romans is situated at the extremity of the Briare Canal, which unites the river Loire and its lateral canal with the Loing and so with the Seine. The lateral canal of the Loire crosses the Loire near Briare by the Briare aqueduct which is 662 m long. Briare station has rail connections to Montargis, Nevers and Paris.

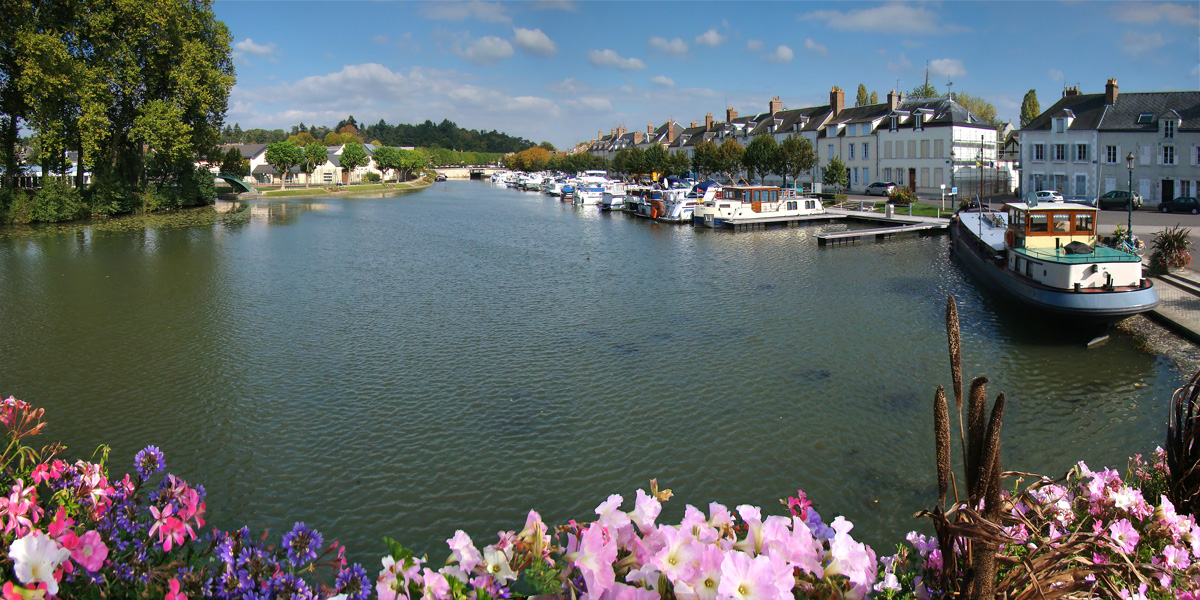
The harbour

== Population ==
Historical population

Year	Pop.	±% p.a.
1793	1,655	—
1800	1,655	+0.00%
1806	1,819	+1.59%
1821	2,082	+0.90%
1831	2,730	+2.75%
1836	2,977	+1.75%
1841	3,239	+1.70%
1846	3,227	−0.07%
1851	3,477	+1.50%
1856	3,843	+2.02%
1861	3,927	+0.43%
1866	4,346	+2.05%
1872	4,775	+1.58%
1876	5,153	+1.92%
1881	5,590	+1.64%
1886	5,894	+1.06%
1891	6,684	+2.55%
1896	5,814	−2.75%
1901	5,630	−0.64%

Year	Pop.	±% p.a.
1906	5,227	−1.47%
1911	4,637	−2.37%
1921	4,577	−0.13%
1926	4,135	−2.01%
1931	4,012	−0.60%
1936	3,791	−1.13%
1946	3,833	+0.11%
1954	3,895	+0.20%
1962	4,114	+0.69%
1968	5,140	+3.78%
1975	5,637	+1.33%
1982	6,267	+1.53%
1990	6,070	−0.40%
1999	5,994	−0.14%
2007	5,660	−0.71%
2012	5,760	+0.35%
2017	5,209	−1.99%
2023	4,911	−0.98%

Source: EHESS and INSEE (1968-2023)

== See also ==
- Communes of the Loiret department
- Emaux de Briare the mosaic manufacturer which made the town double its size in the late 19th century.
