= Saint-Satur =

- Commune
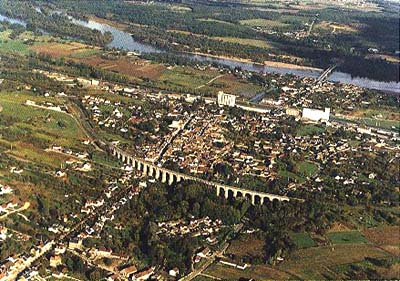
- An aerial view of Saint-Satur

- Coat of arms
- Location of Saint-Satur
- Location within France Location within Centre-Val de Loire
- Coordinates: 47°20′31″N 2°51′15″E
- Country: France
- Region: Centre-Val de Loire
- Department: Cher
- Arrondissement: Bourges
- Canton: Sancerre
- Intercommunality: CC Pays Fort Sancerrois Val de Loire

Government
  - Mayor (2020–2026): Christian Delesgues
- Area^{1}: 7.86 km^{2} (3.03 sq mi)
- Elevation: 180 m (590 ft)
- Highest elevation: 273 m (896 ft)
- Lowest elevation: 144 m (472 ft)
- Population (2023): 1,408
  - Density: 179/km^{2} (464/sq mi)
- Time zone: UTC+01:00 (CET)
  - Summer (DST): UTC+02:00 (CEST)
- INSEE/Postal code: 18233 /18300
- ^{1} French Land Register data, which excludes lakes, ponds, glaciers > 1 km^{2} (0.386 sq mi or 247 acres) and river estuaries.

Saint-Satur (French pronunciation: [sɛ̃ satyʁ]) is a commune in the Cher department in central France.

It is a medieval town near the river Loire in the former province of Berry.

== History ==
Located in the area of Gaul settled by the powerful Celtic tribe, the Bituriges, or the "Kings of the World", and after their defeat at Bourges (Avaricum), part of Roman Aquitania. Some evidence points to the existence of an early Roman river town of Gordona (Castle-Gordon), now Saint-Thibault and Saint-Satur; located on the Roman road (Gordaine) from Bourges to the Roman bridge over the Loire in Saint-Thibault.

An Augustinian abbey was founded in Saint-Satur in 1034. During the Hundred Years' War, the Augustine Abbey was destroyed.

Area transportation was improved by the construction of a suspension bridge at Saint-Thibault (1834), the Canal latéral à la Loire (1838) and later, the Bourges - Sancerre - Cosne-sur-Loire railroad line (1885).

During World War II, Saint-Satur, with Sancerre, was a regional command center for the French Resistance. "Operation Spencer" in 1944 was to prevent the Germans from crossing the Loire River between Gien and Nevers and reinforcing troops in Brittany. The French Resistance and Free French Forces blew up the bridge at Saint-Thibault and sabotaged communication, road and railway lines.

== Geography ==
In the south-eastern part of the commune, the river Vauvise flows into the Loire, which forms all of the commune's eastern boundary.

== Population ==
Historical population
Year	Pop.	±% p.a.
1968	1,759	—
1975	1,774	+0.12%
1982	1,961	+1.44%
1990	1,805	−1.03%
1999	1,731	−0.46%
2007	1,657	−0.54%
2012	1,554	−1.28%
2017	1,426	−1.70%
2023	1,408	−0.21%
Source: INSEE

== See also ==
- Communes of the Cher department
