= Canal du Centre (France) =

Canal in central France

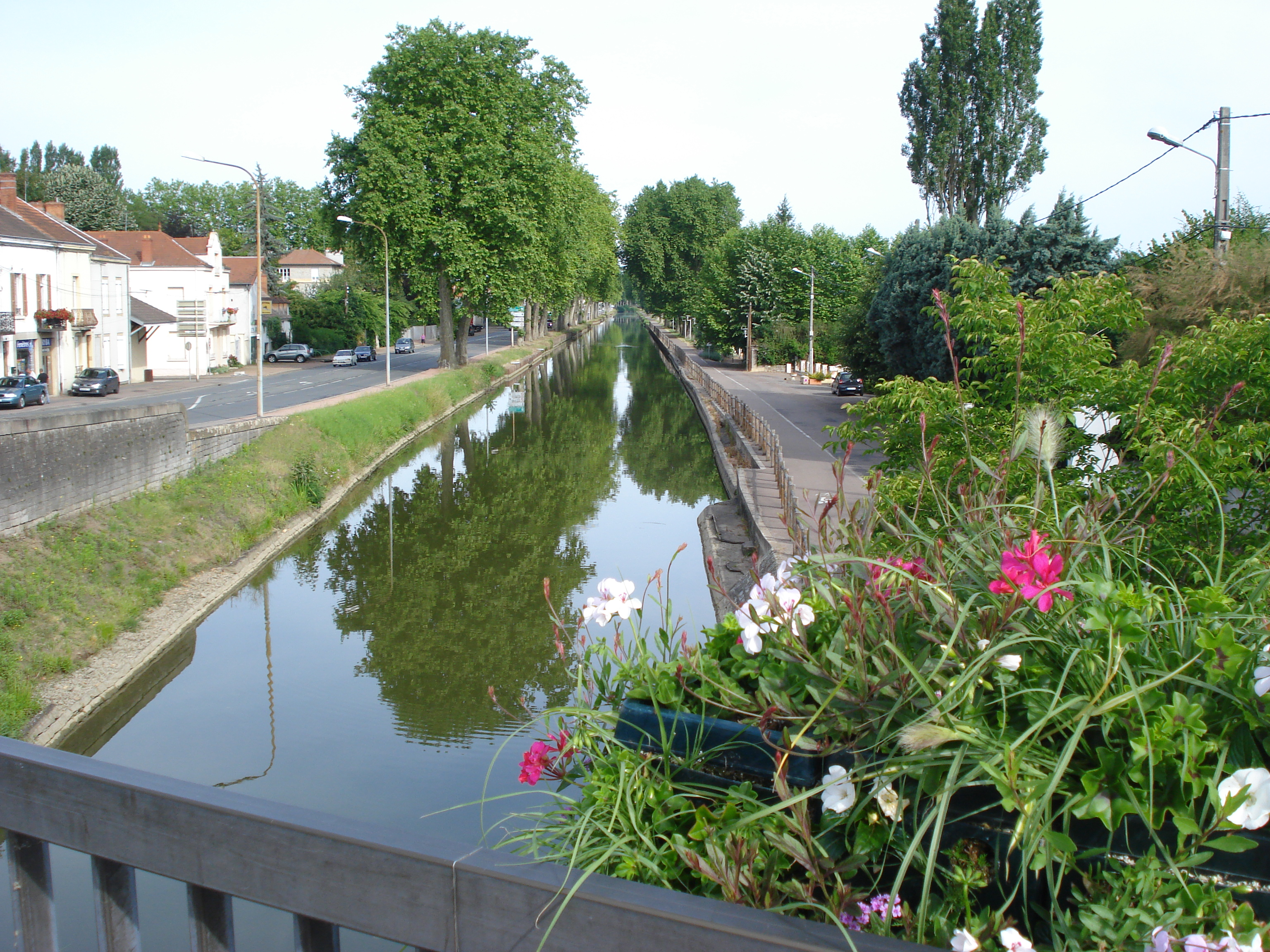
- Canal du Centre in Paray-le-Monial.

Specifications
- Length: 112.1 km (69.7 mi)
- Locks: 61 (originally 80)

History
- Former names: Canal du Charollais
- Principal engineer: Émiland Gauthey
- Date approved: 1783
- Construction began: 1784
- Date of first use: 1792
- Date completed: 1792

Geography
- Start point: Digoin
- End point: Chalon-sur-Saône
- Beginning coordinates: 46.47756°N 3.98053°E at aqueduct crossing Loire in Digoin
- Ending coordinates: 46.79812°N 4.88008°E
- Branch of: Bourbonnais route
- Connects to: Canal latéral à la Loire at Digoin, Saône at Chalon-sur-Saône

The Canal du Centre (French pronunciation: [kanal dy sɑ̃tʁ]), originally known as the Canal du Charollais (French pronunciation: [kanal dy ʃaʁɔlɛ]), is a French canal running from Digoin, where it now joins the Canal latéral à la Loire, to the Saône at Chalon-sur-Saône. It was opened in 1792 and was the first watershed canal allowing boats to pass from the north of France to the south. It is 112.1 kilometres (69.7 mi) long and has 61 locks. Most of its traffic was generated by now abandoned coal mines at Montceau-les-Mines.

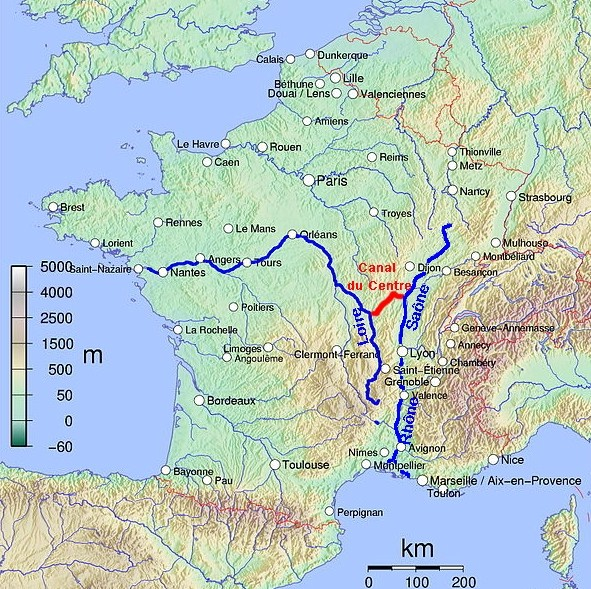
Route of the canal

== History ==
The canal was first suggested during the 16th century, under King Francis I and a detailed plan was prepared by Adam de Craponne in the time of Henry II. But nothing more happened until the Chief Engineer of Burgundy, Émiland Gauthey obtained building powers in 1783. He selected a route which joined the valleys of the Loire and Saône and provided adequate water supplies at the summit. The first stone was laid in 1784 by Prince de Condé and despite the intervention of exceptional floods on the Loire in 1790, which totally wrecked a new port in Digoin, and the Revolution, the works were completed in 1792.

The canal brought new life to the Charollais and within 20 years of opening, many villages had sprung up along its banks. But the amount of traffic that could be carried towards Paris was limited by the fickle nature of the Loire, and it was estimated that the opening of the Canal latéral à la Loire would triple the toll income of the canal. This happened in 1838, five years after the establishment of coal mines at Montceau-les-Mines, and this increased the traffic until in 1936 some 1,622,000 tonnes of coal was carried on the canal. The coal traffic declined during the 1980s, and the mines were closed in 2000.

== Layout ==
Originally the canal climbed 77.64 m from the Loire to the summit and dropped 130.90 m to the Saône, through a total of 80 locks. These were enlarged in 1880–1900 when they were all rebuilt to the Freycinet gauge and the number of locks was reduced. During the 1950s about 5 km of canal in the centre of Chalon was replaced by a new cut upstream of the town with a single 10.76 m deep lock replacing 3 locks.

== Route ==
Kilometre distances according to

- PK 112 Digoin
- PK 99 Paray-le-Monial
- PK 80 Génelard
- PK 62 Montceau-les-Mines
- PK 59 Blanzy
- PK 50 Montchanin
- PK 42 Saint-Julien-sur-Dheune
- PK 31 Saint-Léger-sur-Dheune
- PK 22.5 Santenay
- PK 17 Chagny
- PK 14.5 Rully
- PK 6 Fragnes
- PK 0 Chalon-sur-Saône

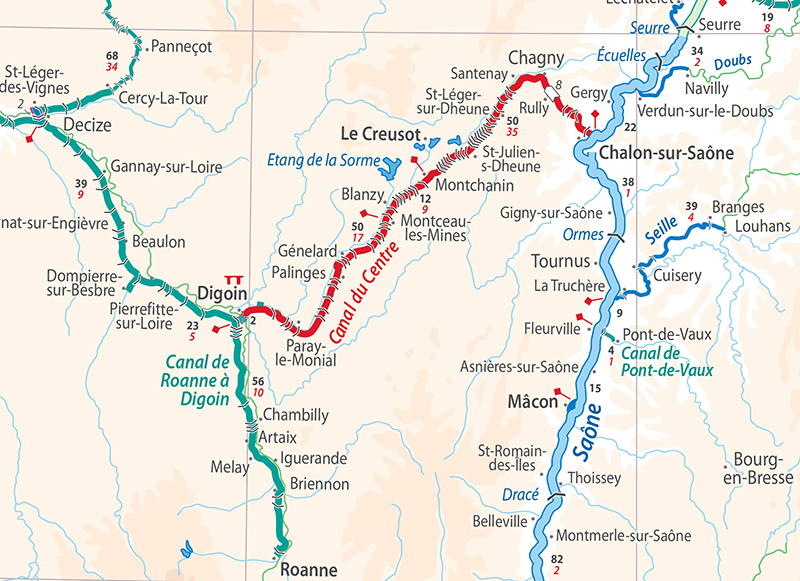
Location of the Canal du Centre in relation to the other waterways of central France (from European Waterways Map and Directory, 5th ed., 2014, by David Edwards-May, publ. Transmanche)

== See also ==
- List of canals in France
