= Lateral canal =

A lateral canal is a canal built along the same right-of-way as an existing stream. Water for the canal is usually provided by the original natural stream. Many French lateral canals have the word latéral as part of their name. Examples include Canal latéral à l'Aisne, Canal latéral à la Garonne, and Canal latéral à la Marne.

The normal aim of constructing such a canal was to provide a more consistent depth of water for navigation particularly during dry summers and to make navigation easier during periods of flood. Problems often remained where the original course of the river was still used.

== See also ==
- Canal
- Summit level canal
