= Châtillon-sur-Loire =

- Commune
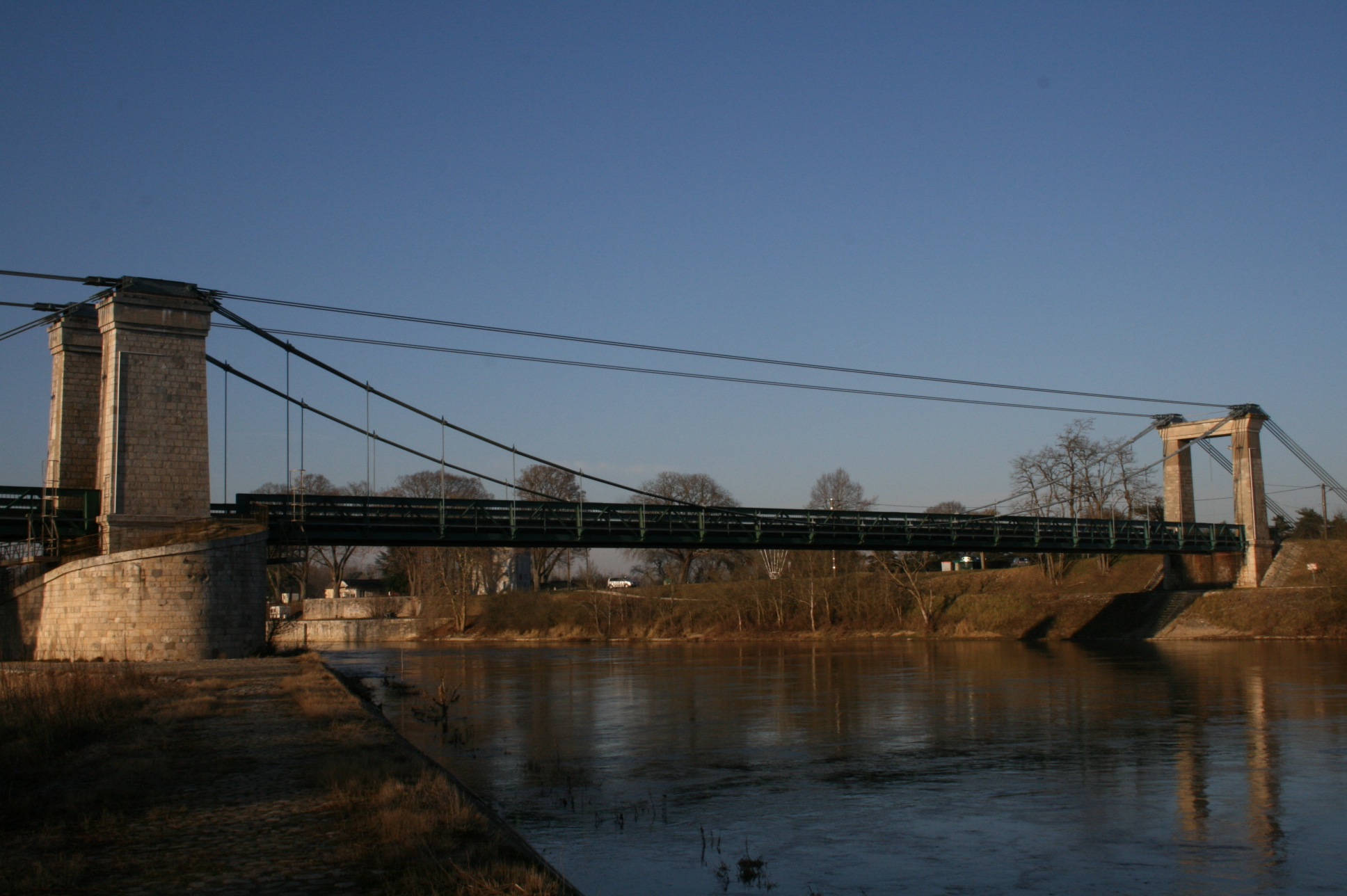
- The suspension bridge

- Coat of arms
- Location of Châtillon-sur-Loire
- Location within France Location within Centre-Val de Loire
- Coordinates: 47°35′33″N 2°45′14″E
- Country: France
- Region: Centre-Val de Loire
- Department: Loiret
- Arrondissement: Montargis
- Canton: Gien
- Intercommunality: Berry Loire Puisaye

Government
  - Mayor (2025–2026): Gérard Galfano
- Area^{1}: 40.67 km^{2} (15.70 sq mi)
- Highest elevation: 246 m (807 ft)
- Lowest elevation: 126 m (413 ft)
- Population (2023): 3,065
  - Density: 75.36/km^{2} (195.2/sq mi)
- Demonym: Châtillonnais
- Time zone: UTC+01:00 (CET)
  - Summer (DST): UTC+02:00 (CEST)
- INSEE/Postal code: 45087 /45360
- Website: www.chatillon-sur-loire.com
- ^{1} French Land Register data, which excludes lakes, ponds, glaciers > 1 km^{2} (0.386 sq mi or 247 acres) and river estuaries.

Châtillon-sur-Loire (French pronunciation: [ʃatijɔ̃ syʁ lwaʁ], literally Châtillon on Loire) is a commune in the Loiret department in north-central France.

== Population ==
Historical population
Year	Pop.	±% p.a.
1968	2,301	—
1975	2,326	+0.15%
1982	2,491	+0.98%
1990	2,822	+1.57%
1999	2,947	+0.48%
2007	3,072	+0.52%
2012	3,137	+0.42%
2017	3,144	+0.04%
2023	3,065	−0.42%
Source: INSEE

== See also ==
- Communes of the Loiret department
