= Canton of Baugy =

Coordinates: 47°4′59″N 2°43′59″E

Baugy
- Former canton
- Interactive map of Baugy
- Country: France
- Region: Centre-Val de Loire
- Department: Cher
- No. of communes: {{{nbcomm}}}
- Disbanded: 2015
- Area: 392.70 km^{2} (151.62 sq mi)
- Population (2012): 11,526
  - Density: 29.351/km^{2} (76.018/sq mi)

The Canton of Baugy is a former canton in the Cher département and in the Centre region of France. It was disbanded following the French canton reorganisation effective in March 2015. It consisted of 17 communes, which joined the canton of Avord in 2015. It had 11,526 inhabitants in 2012.

== Geography ==
A farming area in the arrondissement of Bourges. centred on the town of Baugy. The altitude varies from 132 metres (433 ft) at Moulins-sur-Yèvre to 263 metres (863 ft) at Gron with an average altitude of 187 metres (614 ft).

The canton comprised 17 communes:

- Avord
- Baugy
- Bengy-sur-Craon
- Chassy
- Crosses
- Farges-en-Septaine
- Gron
- Jussy-Champagne
- Laverdines
- Moulins-sur-Yèvre
- Nohant-en-Goût
- Osmoy
- Saligny-le-Vif
- Savigny-en-Septaine
- Villabon
- Villequiers
- Vornay

== Population ==
Historical population Canton of Baugy
| Year | 1962 | 1968 | 1975 | 1982 | 1990 | 1999 |
| Pop. | 8,298 | 8,956 | 8,672 | 8,757 | 8,809 | 9,410 |
| ±% | — | +7.9% | −3.2% | +1.0% | +0.6% | +6.8% |
From the year 1962 on: No double counting – residents of multiple communes (e.g. students and military personnel) are counted only once. Source: INSEE

== See also ==
- Arrondissements of the Cher department
- Cantons of the Cher department
- Communes of the Cher department
