= Communauté de communes de la Champagne balgycienne =

Champagne balgycienne
- Former communauté de communes
- Country: France
- Region: Centre-Val de Loire
- Department: Cher
- No. of communes: {{{nbcomm}}}
- Established: 2000
- Disbanded: 2010
- Area: 111.88 km^{2} (43.20 sq mi)
- Population (1999): 2,674
  - Density: 23.90/km^{2} (61.90/sq mi)

The communauté de communes de la Champagne balgycienne was created on December 22, 1999 and is located in the Cher département of the Centre region of France. It was created in January 2000. It was merged into the Communauté de communes de la Septaine in January 2010.

The Communauté de communes comprised the following communes:

1. Baugy
2. Gron
3. Saligny-le-Vif
4. Villabon
5. Villequiers
