= Elizabeth of the Trinity =

French Discalced Carmelite nun

Saint Elizabeth of the Trinity OCD
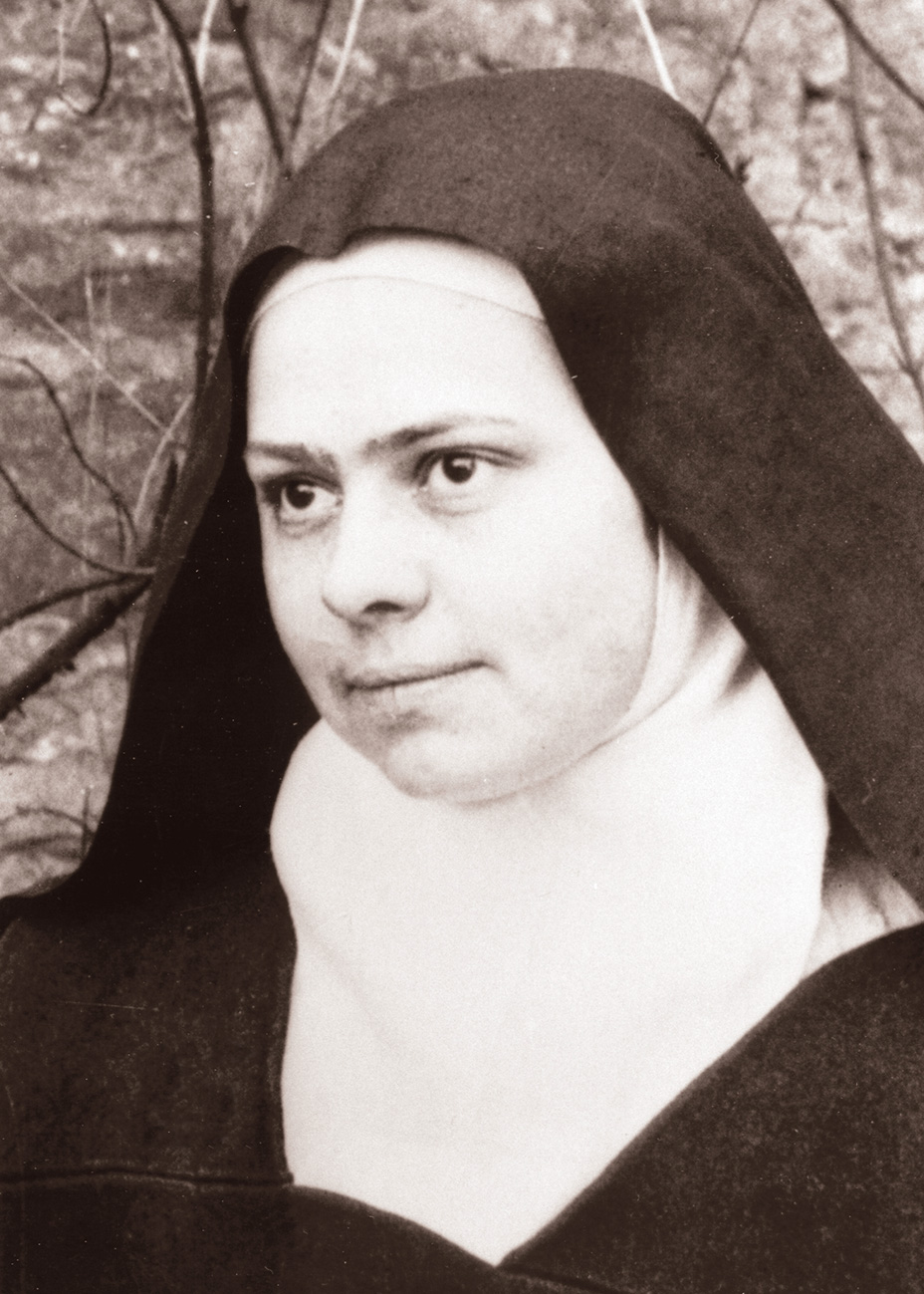

Virgin
- Born: 18 July 1880; Avord, Farges-en-Septaine, France
- Died: 9 November 1906 (aged 26); Dijon, France
- Venerated in: Catholic Church
- Beatified: 25 November 1984, Paris, France by Pope John Paul II
- Canonized: 16 October 2016, Saint Peter's Square by Pope Francis
- Feast: 9 November

Elizabeth of the Trinity, OCD (French: Élisabeth de la Trinité; born Élisabeth Catez; 18 July 1880 – 9 November 1906), was a French Discalced Carmelite mystic and spiritual writer. She was known for the depth of her spiritual growth as a Carmelite as well as bleak periods in which her religious calling was perceived to be unsure according to those around her. She was acknowledged for her persistence in pursuing the will of God and in devoting herself to the charism of the Carmelites.

Elizabeth was also a gifted pianist and had strong feelings for the Carmelite charism. Of that experience as a professed religious she wrote in a letter: "I can't find words to express my happiness. Here there is no longer anything but God. He is All; He suffices and we live by Him alone" (Letter 91). Central to her spirituality were three names she felt she received from God: House of God, Praise of Glory, and Host of Praise.

Pope John Paul II celebrated her beatification in Paris on 25 November 1984; Pope Francis approved her canonization on 3 March 2016. The date was decided at a gathering of cardinals on 20 June 2016 and she was canonized on 16 October 2016.

== Life ==
She was born on 18 July 1880 as Élisabeth Catez at the military base at Avord in Cher as the first child of Captain Joseph Catez and Marie Rolland. She was baptized at the camp's chapel on 22 July. Elizabeth's father died unexpectedly on 2 October 1887 and as a result the family moved to Dijon. During that same year she made her first confession. Her First Communion was on 19 April 1891 at Saint-Michel, and her Confirmation was at Notre-Dame on the following 8 June.

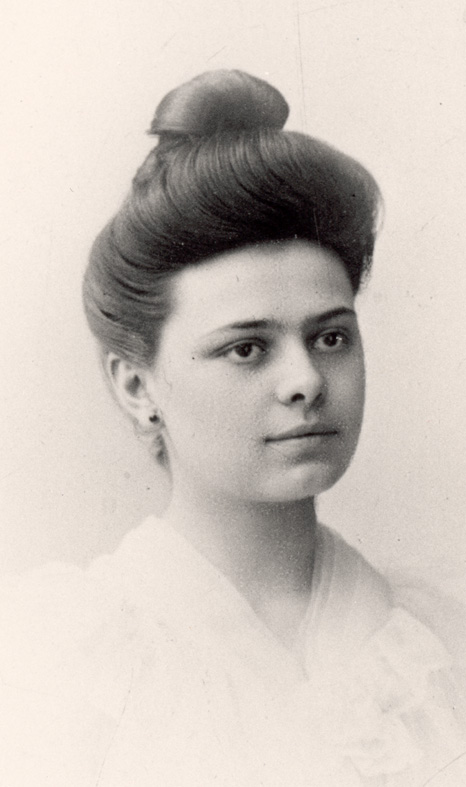
Élisabeth Catez as a girl

Elizabeth had a terrible temper as a child. After receiving her First Communion in 1891 she gained more self-control and had a deeper understanding of God and the world. She also gained a profound understanding of the Trinity to which she cultivated an ardent devotion. Elizabeth visited the sick, sang in the church choir and taught religion to children who worked in factories.

As she grew older Elizabeth became interested in entering the Discalced Carmelite Order, though her mother strongly advised against it. Men had asked for Elizabeth's hand in marriage, but she declined such offers because her dream was to enter the Discalced Carmelite monastery that was located 200 meters (660 ft) from her home. Elizabeth entered the Dijon Carmel on 2 August 1901. She said: "I find Him everywhere while doing the wash as well as while praying." Her time in the convent amongst other Carmelites had some high times as well as some very low times. She wrote about when she felt she needed a richer understanding of God's great love.

At the end of her life, she began to call herself "Laudem Gloriae". Elizabeth wanted that to be her appellation in Heaven because it means 'praise of glory'. She said: "I think that in Heaven my mission will be to draw souls by helping them to go out of themselves in order to cling to God by a wholly simple and loving movement, and to keep them in this great silence which will allow God to communicate Himself to them and to transform them into Himself." Her spirituality is considered to be remarkably similar to that of her contemporary and compatriot Discalced Carmelite sister, Thérèse of Lisieux, who was cloistered at the Carmel in Lisieux; the two share a zeal for contemplation and the salvation of souls.

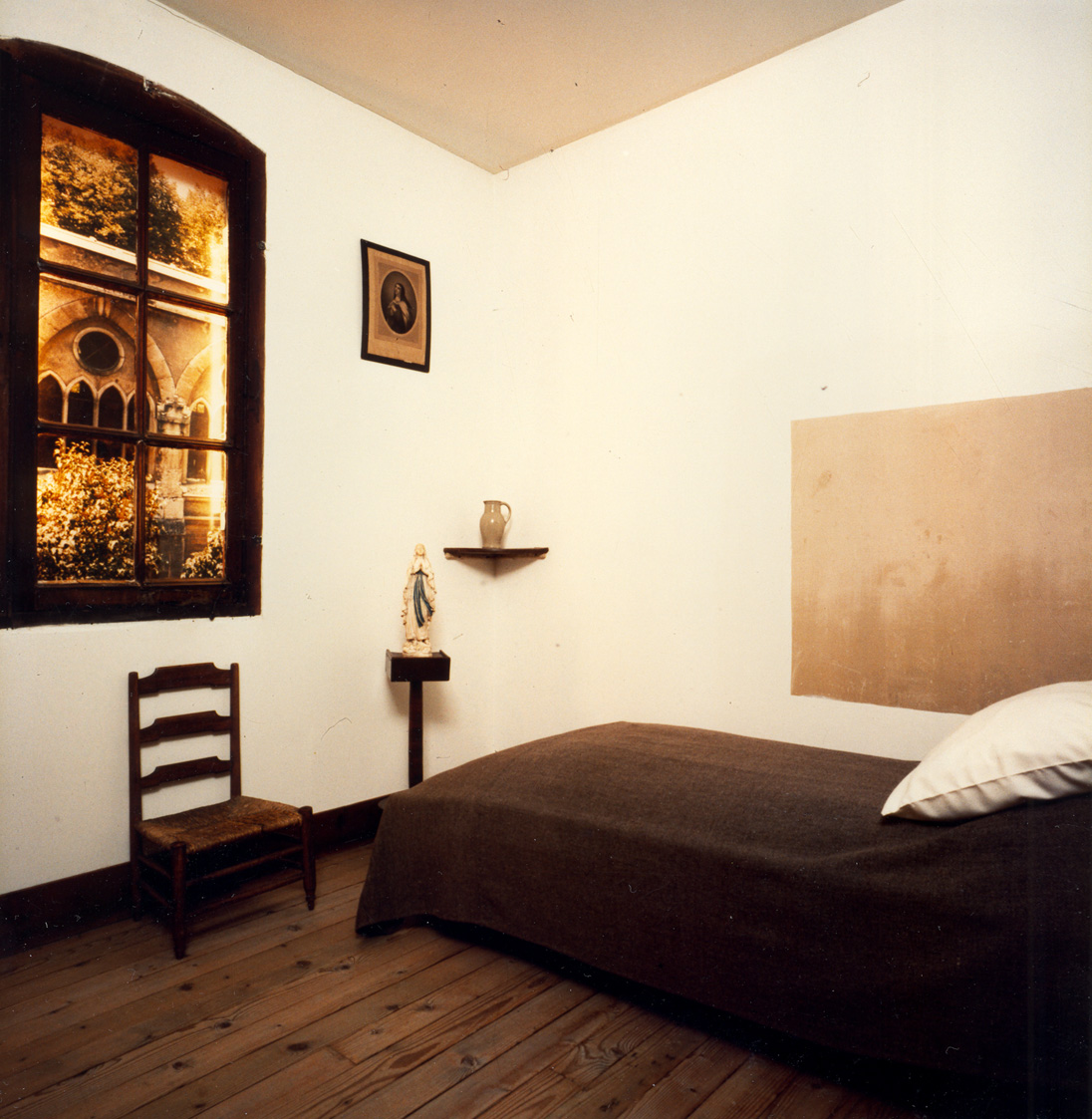
Elizabeth's monastic cell in Dijon

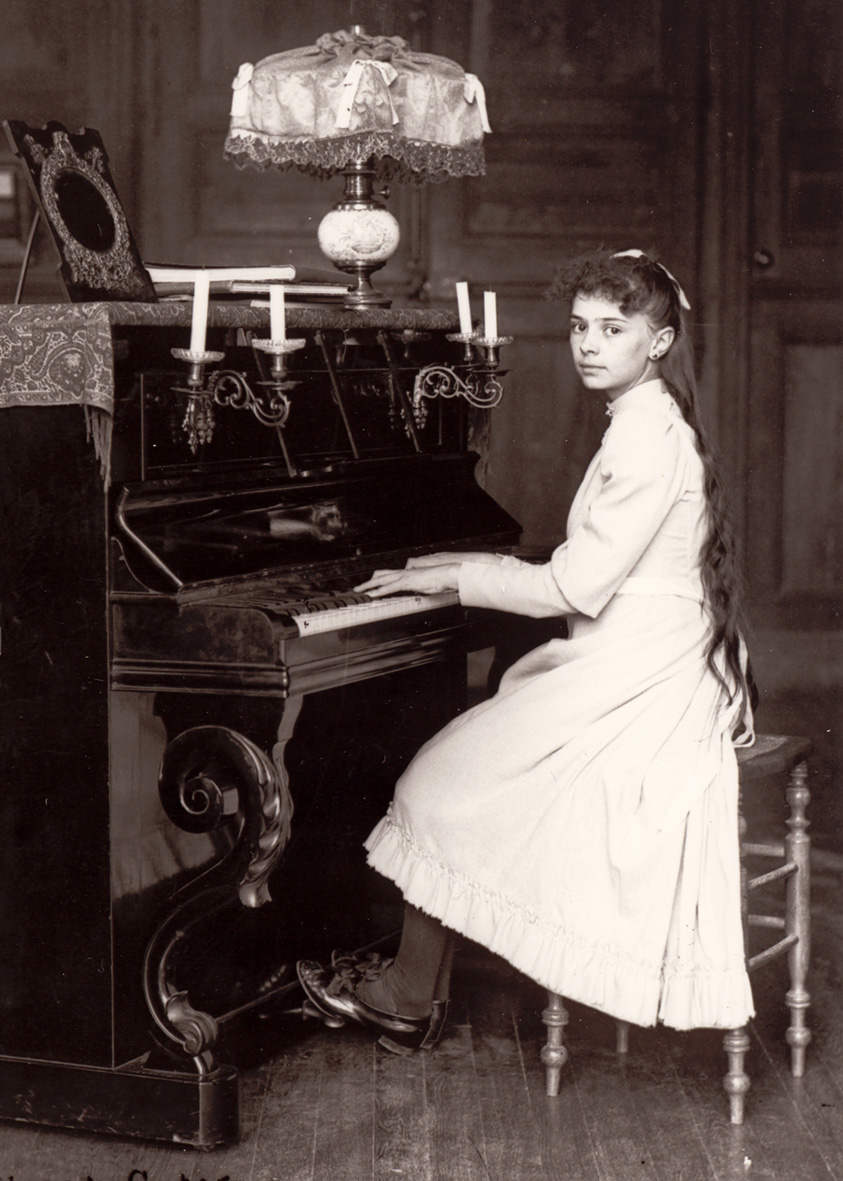
Picture of Elizabeth of the Trinity as a young child playing the piano

Elizabeth died at the age of 26 of Addison's disease, which had no cure. Though her death was painful, Elizabeth gratefully accepted her suffering as a gift from God. Her last words were: "I am going to Light, to Love, to Life!"

== Beatification process ==
The process for Elizabeth's beatification started in 1931 in Dijon, and lasted until 1941. Her writings were gathered and after careful investigation were incorporated into the cause and approved as being valid additions on 28 January 1944. A second process opened in 1948 and closed in 1950; the official introduction of the cause came on 25 October 1961, and she received the title of Servant of God.

The third and final process was opened in 1963 and closed in 1965, and two decrees ratified the prior processes in 1969 and on 13 March 1970; this allowed the Congregation of Rites to assume control of the cause to further investigate her life and her spiritual works. After an extensive investigation that spanned more than a decade, on 12 July 1982 she was made Venerable after Pope John Paul II acknowledged the fact that she had lived a full life of heroic virtue.

The miracle needed for her beatification was investigated from 1964 and closed in 1965; it received validation in 1969. John Paul II approved the healing as being a legitimate miracle in 1984, and beatified Elizabeth on 25 November 1984, on the occasion of an apostolic visit to Paris.

The second miracle needed for canonization was investigated in the diocese of the healing's origin from 11 July 2011 until 25 August 2012; it received ratification several months later on 28 June 2013.

Pope Francis on 3 March 2016 approved the second healing as being a miracle attributed to Elizabeth's intercession and thus approved her canonization as a saint. A date of canonization was determined at a gathering of cardinals on 20 June 2016. Her canonization was celebrated on 16 October 2016. The postulator of the cause at the time of her canonization was Romano Gambalunga.

=== Feast and patronage ===
Her liturgical feast is celebrated annually on 9 November. Her most famous prayer is: "Holy Trinity Whom I Adore", written out of her love of the Most Blessed Trinity. Elizabeth of the Trinity is a patron against illness, of sick people, and of the loss of parents.

== See also ==
- Saint Elizabeth of the Trinity, patron saint archive
