= Groises =

- Commune
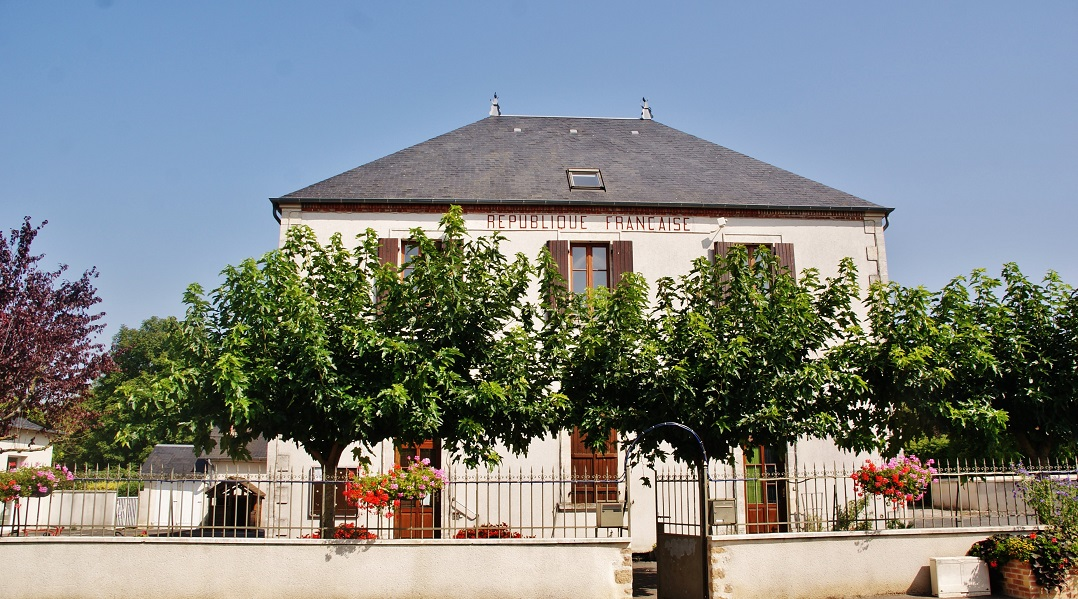
- The town hall in Groises
- Location of Groises
- Location within France Location within Centre-Val de Loire
- Coordinates: 47°12′36″N 2°48′38″E
- Country: France
- Region: Centre-Val de Loire
- Department: Cher
- Arrondissement: Bourges
- Canton: Avord

Government
  - Mayor (2020–2026): Marie-Pierre Verneau
- Area^{1}: 17.63 km^{2} (6.81 sq mi)
- Elevation: 183 m (600 ft)
- Highest elevation: 208 m (682 ft)
- Lowest elevation: 167 m (548 ft)
- Population (2023): 129
  - Density: 7.32/km^{2} (19.0/sq mi)
- Time zone: UTC+01:00 (CET)
  - Summer (DST): UTC+02:00 (CEST)
- INSEE/Postal code: 18104 /18140
- ^{1} French Land Register data, which excludes lakes, ponds, glaciers > 1 km^{2} (0.386 sq mi or 247 acres) and river estuaries.

Groises (French pronunciation: [ɡʁwaz]) is a commune in the Cher department in the Centre-Val de Loire region of France.

== Geography ==
A farming area comprising a small village and a couple of hamlets situated by the banks of the river Chantraine, some 20 miles (32 km) northeast of Bourges, at the junction of the D10, D44 and the D51 roads.

== Population ==
Historical population
Year	Pop.	±% p.a.
1968	237	—
1975	225	−0.74%
1982	197	−1.88%
1990	155	−2.95%
1999	138	−1.28%
2007	138	+0.00%
2012	144	+0.85%
2017	131	−1.87%
2023	129	−0.26%
Source: INSEE

== Sights ==
- The church of St. Martin, dating from the twelfth century.

== See also ==
- Communes of the Cher department
