= Georges Jeanclos =

French sculptor

- Born: Georges Jeankelowitsch; 9 April 1933; Paris, France
- Died: 30 March 1997; Paris, France
- Occupations: sculptor, ceramic artist

Georges Jeanclos (9 April 1933 – 30 March 1997) was a French sculptor, and ceramic artist working mostly with terracotta, but also bronze. He is known for his sculptures of human figures made of and covered with thin sheets of clay, some bearing Hebrew letters.

== Early life and education ==
Georges Jeankelowitsch was born in Paris into a Jewish family, Lithuanian on his father's side and the Comtat Venaissin on his mother's. In 1943, at the age of 10, he hid with his family in the forests around Vichy for one year to escape the Gestapo in Nazi-occupied France. After the war the family changed their name to Jeanclos.

In 1946, after WWII at the age of thirteen, he apprenticed to a sculptor, Robert Mermet (1896-1988). From 1952 to 1959 he studied at the École nationale supérieure des Beaux-Arts.

== Career ==
In 1959, he won the Premier Grand Prix de Rome. From 1959 through 1964 he studied at the Villa Medici in Rome under the direction of Polish French artist Balthus.

He taught at the École des Beaux-Arts in Le Mans from 1965 until 1966 and eventually at the École nationale supérieure des Beaux-Arts. In the 1970s, he moved his studio to rue des Écouffes in Le Marais, the Jewish quarter in Paris. In 1982, he founded the research and creation studio at the Manufacture de Sèvres. He was their director until he died in 1997.

== Personal life and death ==
In 1960, he married Jacqueline Gateau and had three children, Marc, Elisabeth and Emmanuel. In 1988 he married Mathilde Ferrer. In 1997 he died at the age of 63 years of cancer, before his last work, the portal of Notre-Dame de la Treille was installed in 1997.

== Work ==
The sculptures are made of and covered with thin sheets of clay, which has been intensely beaten and stretched under enormous physical effort. Human figures are often made with the help of moulds. His sculptures represent or incorporate Jewish themes: Hebrew letters from the mourning Kaddish on blankets of sleepers, urns, references to the medieval rabbi Rashi, and meditating poses ("Kamamuras").

Public commissions of bronze work began in 1983, with the support of François Mitterrand, who was fond of his work. This resulted in five public sculptures in Paris alone (Homage to Jean Moulin on the Champs-Élysées in 1984, a fountain on Place Stalingrad in 1988, the Saint-Julien-le-Pauvre fountain Square Viviani in 1991, the Fruits of the Earth, which are the massive bronze doors of the Finance Ministry in 1987), one in Provins (the tympanum of the church of Saint-Ayoul in 1985), one in Savigny-en-Septaine (a monument commemorating the Tragedy of the Guerry's wells in 1992) and the last one in Lille (the portal of Notre-Dame de la Treille in 1997).

== Bibliography ==
- Jeanclos-Mossé, Georges (2011). Georges Jeanclos : œuvres et écrits. Précédé de La force de la fragilité. Galerie Capazza. OCLC 730997959.
