= Tragedy of the Guerry's wells =

Second world war massacre

The tragedy of the Guerry's wells designates the massacre of 36 Jews during the summer of 1944 in Savigny-en-Septaine in France. It is located at 47°02′07″N 02°31′26″E.

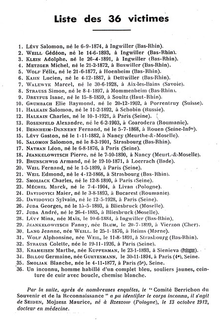
List of the victims.

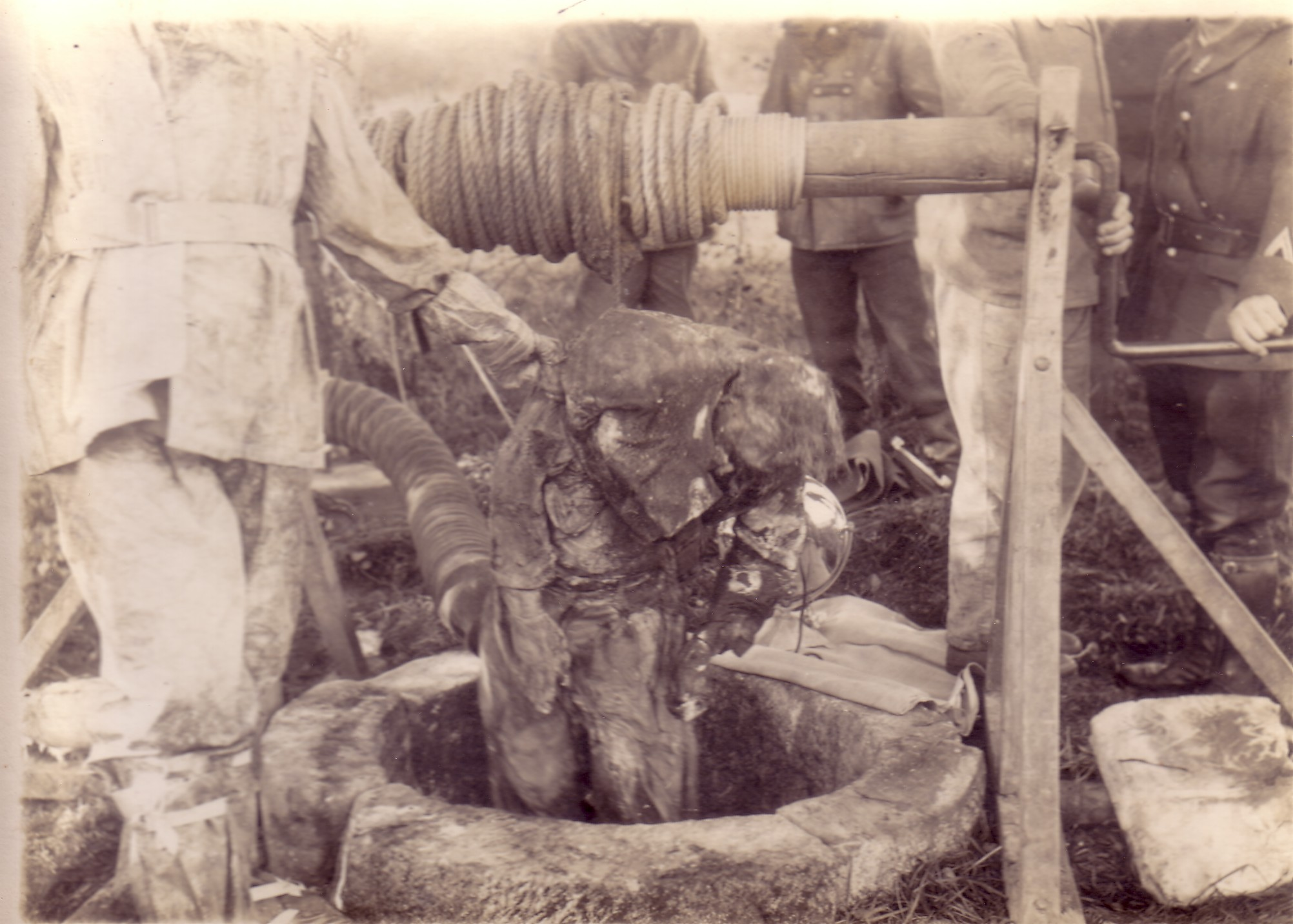
The recovery of the bodies of the massacre

== History ==
On July 21, 1944, men from the French milice led by Joseph Lécussan, and the Gestapo arrested 70 Jewish refugees. Most of them were from Alsace-Lorraine, but had managed to hide in Saint-Amand-Montrond and its surroundings since autumn of 1939. They lived there for five years in relative safety. On a farm, 36 persons were thrown in three different wells along with some stones in order to crush them alive. The victims were men and women aged from 16 to 85.

Only one man, Charles Krameisen, managed to survive and to crawl back alive from the well. After the Liberation, his testimony allowed the site of the massacre and the bodies of the victims to be found, on October 18, 1944.

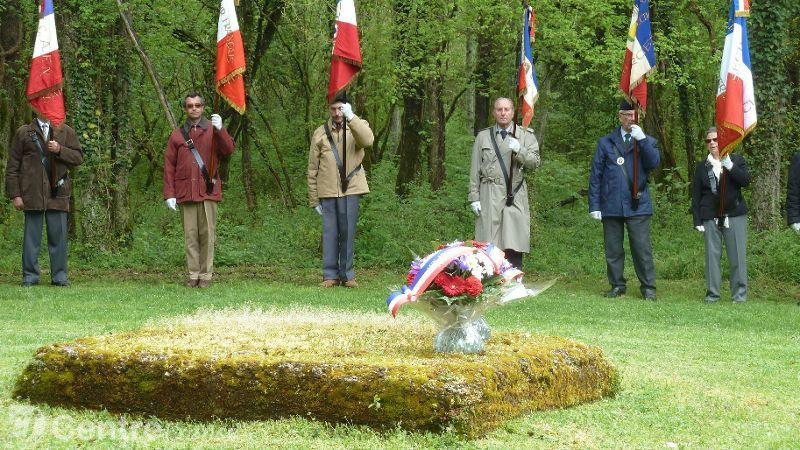
Commemoration at the site.

The event can be seen as an example among hundreds which bear witness to the atrocity of the Jewish genocide undertaken by the Nazis in France with the help of French militias.

One of those responsible for the massacre was Pierre Paoli, a French agent of the SD of Bourges, acting under the orders of Friedrich Merdsche; he was condemned to death and executed in 1946.

== Commemoration ==
In 1992, a monument to commemorate the atrocity was made by Georges Jeanclos, who himself had hidden for one year in a forest to escape the Gestapo. His uncle Pierre Jeankelowitsch (number 18) and aunt Fanny Jeankelowitsch (number 29 on the list) were amongst the victims of the tragedy of Guerry.

In 2013, tributes to the victims were held with a commemoration.
