= Pierre Cotignon de la Charnaye =

French poet

Pierre Cotignon de la Charnaye (1588–1638) was a French poet of the first half of the 17th century.

Born in Nivernais around 1588, he was the son of Philibert Cotignon and Hélène de Saint-Victor. He spent most of his life in his castle of La Charnaye located in the current commune of Argenvières (Cher). He often travelled to Paris though and met Guillaume Colletet, abbot Marolles, as well as many poets and musicians. He was a member of the Illustres Bergers.

When he became a canon in 1630, he repudiated his verses and began to write Les Travaux de Jésus, five thousand alexandrines devoted to Christ's Passion.

== Works ==
- 1623: La Muse champêtre, Text online
- 1625: Le Phylaxandre, novel
- 1626: L'Ouvrage poétique, reprinted under the title Les Vers du sieur de la Charnaye (1632)
- 1628: L'Eventail satyrique
- 1632: Les Bocages, comédie pastorale, Text online (manuscript)
- 1638: Les Travaux de Jésus Text online

== Bibliography ==
- Maurice Mignon. Pierre Cotignon de la Charnaye, poète nivernais du XVII. Nevers, 1912
