= Moulins-sur-Yèvre =

- Commune
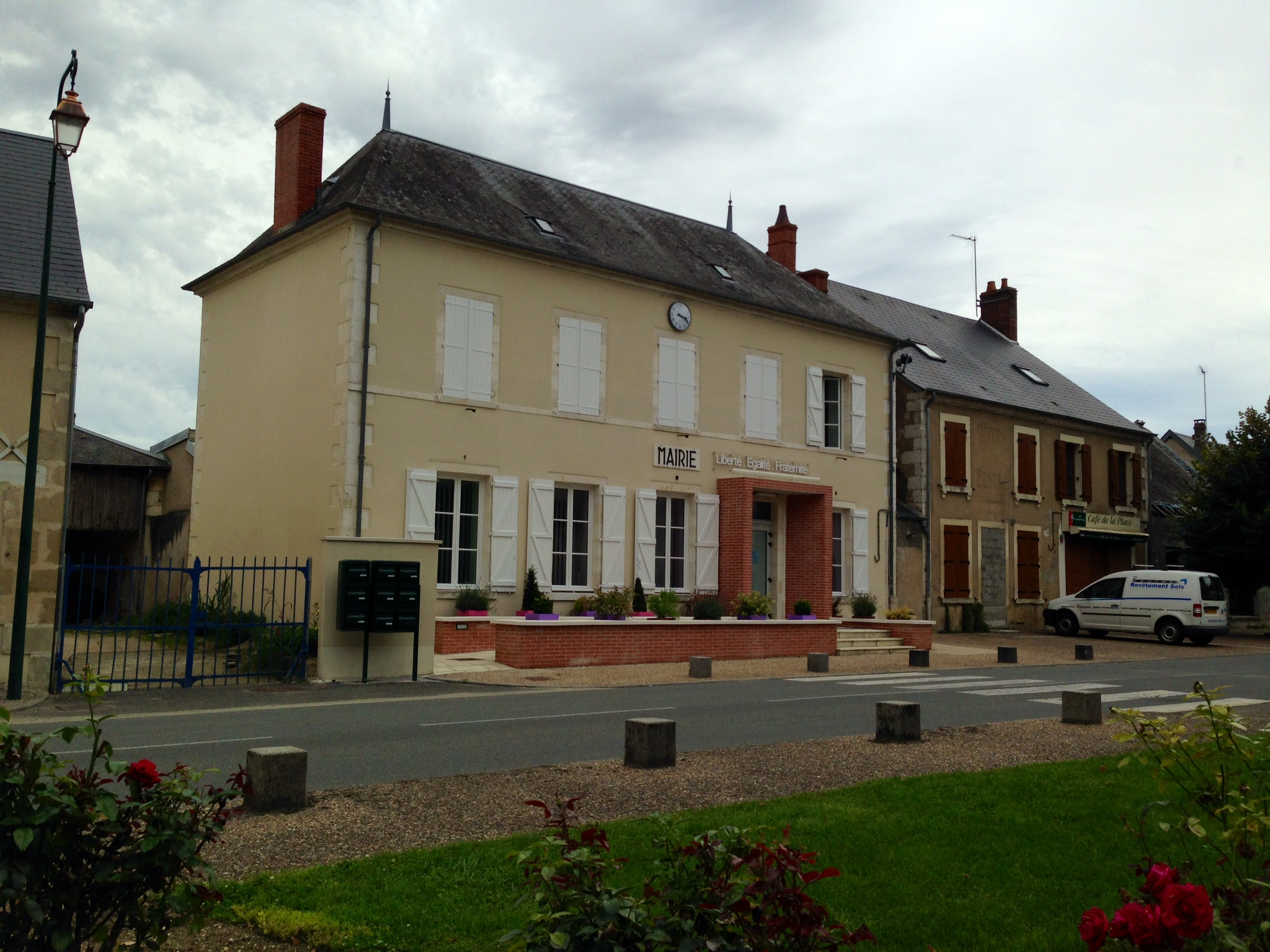
- Mairie of Moulins-sur-Yèvre
- Location of Moulins-sur-Yèvre
- Location within France Location within Centre-Val de Loire
- Coordinates: 47°05′01″N 2°31′05″E
- Country: France
- Region: Centre-Val de Loire
- Department: Cher
- Arrondissement: Bourges
- Canton: Avord
- Intercommunality: CC Terres du Haut Berry

Government
  - Mayor (2020–2026): Fabien Chausse
- Area^{1}: 15.33 km^{2} (5.92 sq mi)
- Elevation: 140 m (460 ft)
- Highest elevation: 172 m (564 ft)
- Lowest elevation: 132 m (433 ft)
- Population (2023): 850
  - Density: 55/km^{2} (140/sq mi)
- Time zone: UTC+01:00 (CET)
  - Summer (DST): UTC+02:00 (CEST)
- INSEE/Postal code: 18158 /18390
- ^{1} French Land Register data, which excludes lakes, ponds, glaciers > 1 km^{2} (0.386 sq mi or 247 acres) and river estuaries.

Moulins-sur-Yèvre (French pronunciation: [mulɛ̃ syʁ jɛvʁ], literally Moulins on Yèvre) is a commune in the Cher department in the Centre-Val de Loire region of France.

== Geography ==
A farming area comprising the village and several hamlets situated by the banks of the river Yèvre, some 6 miles (9.7 km) east of Bourges, at the junction of the D46 with the N151 and the D156 roads.

== Population ==
Historical population
Year	Pop.	±% p.a.
1968	445	—
1975	421	−0.79%
1982	369	−1.87%
1990	382	+0.43%
1999	466	+2.23%
2007	567	+2.48%
2012	778	+6.53%
2017	852	+1.83%
2023	850	−0.04%
Source: INSEE

== See also ==
- Communes of the Cher department
