= Argenvières =

- Commune
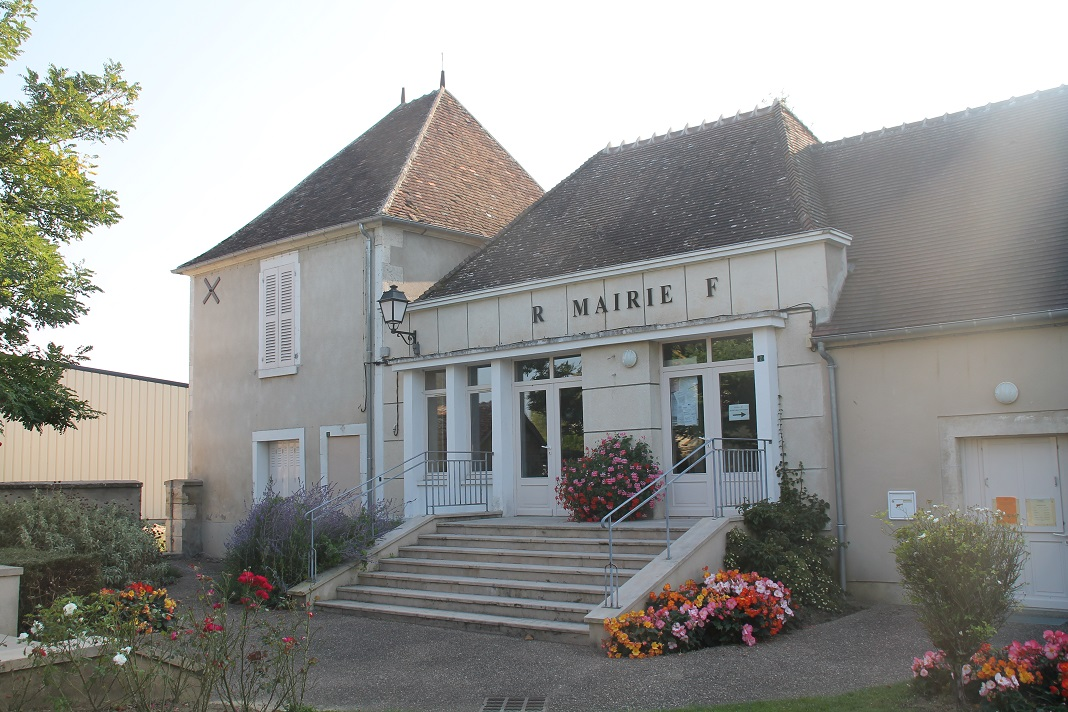
- Town hall

- Coat of arms
- Location of Argenvières
- Location within France Location within Centre-Val de Loire
- Coordinates: 47°08′16″N 3°00′23″E
- Country: France
- Region: Centre-Val de Loire
- Department: Cher
- Arrondissement: Bourges
- Canton: Avord
- Intercommunality: CC Berry Loire Vauvise

Government
  - Mayor (2021–2026): Francine Menard
- Area^{1}: 14.72 km^{2} (5.68 sq mi)
- Elevation: 170 m (560 ft)
- Highest elevation: 192 m (630 ft)
- Lowest elevation: 156 m (512 ft)
- Population (2023): 448
  - Density: 30.4/km^{2} (78.8/sq mi)
- Time zone: UTC+01:00 (CET)
  - Summer (DST): UTC+02:00 (CEST)
- INSEE/Postal code: 18012 /18140
- ^{1} French Land Register data, which excludes lakes, ponds, glaciers > 1 km^{2} (0.386 sq mi or 247 acres) and river estuaries.

Argenvières (French pronunciation: [aʁʒɑ̃vjɛʁ]) is a commune in the Cher department in the Centre-Val de Loire region of France, by the banks of the river Loire and on the Canal latéral à la Loire, about 30 miles (48 km) east of Bourges.

== Population ==
Historical population
Year	Pop.	±% p.a.
1968	403	—
1975	401	−0.07%
1982	402	+0.04%
1990	395	−0.22%
1999	435	+1.08%
2007	437	+0.06%
2012	481	+1.94%
2017	461	−0.85%
2023	448	−0.48%
Source: INSEE

== See also ==
- Communes of the Cher department
- Pierre Cotignon de la Charnaye
