= Soye-en-Septaine =

- Commune
- Location of Soye-en-Septaine
- Location within France Location within Centre-Val de Loire
- Coordinates: 47°01′39″N 2°29′24″E
- Country: France
- Region: Centre-Val de Loire
- Department: Cher
- Arrondissement: Bourges
- Canton: Trouy
- Intercommunality: CC de la Septaine

Government
  - Mayor (2020–2026): Michel Tibayrenc
- Area^{1}: 18.57 km^{2} (7.17 sq mi)
- Elevation: 170 m (560 ft)
- Highest elevation: 177 m (581 ft)
- Lowest elevation: 132 m (433 ft)
- Population (2023): 582
  - Density: 31.3/km^{2} (81.2/sq mi)
- Time zone: UTC+01:00 (CET)
  - Summer (DST): UTC+02:00 (CEST)
- INSEE/Postal code: 18254 /18340
- ^{1} French Land Register data, which excludes lakes, ponds, glaciers > 1 km^{2} (0.386 sq mi or 247 acres) and river estuaries.

Soye-en-Septaine (French pronunciation: [swa ɑ̃ sɛptɛn]) is a commune in the Cher department in the Centre-Val de Loire region of France.

== Geography ==
An area of forestry and farming comprising the village and a couple of hamlets situated in the valley of the river Auron, about 5 miles (8.0 km) southeast of Bourges, at the junction of the D2076 with the D15 and D46 roads.

== Population ==
Historical population
Year	Pop.	±% p.a.
1968	442	—
1975	428	−0.46%
1982	446	+0.59%
1990	475	+0.79%
1999	563	+1.91%
2007	565	+0.04%
2012	575	+0.35%
2017	583	+0.28%
2023	582	−0.03%
Source: INSEE

== Sights ==
- The church of Notre-Dame, dating from the nineteenth century.
- The twelfth-century church of St. Pardoux (closed).

== See also ==
- Communes of the Cher department
