= Saint-Léger-le-Petit =

- Commune
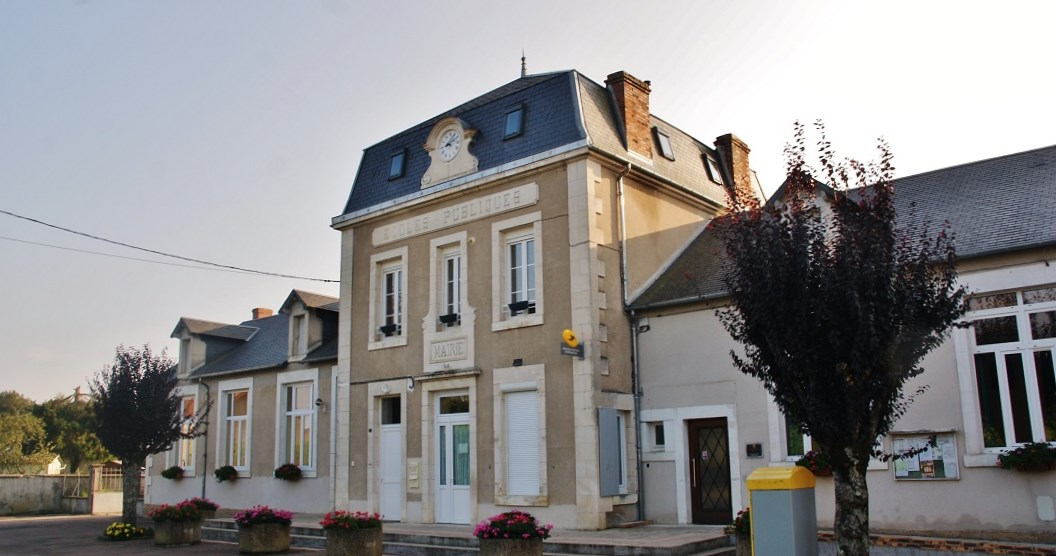
- Town hall
- Location of Saint-Léger-le-Petit
- Location within France Location within Centre-Val de Loire
- Coordinates: 47°07′24″N 3°00′17″E
- Country: France
- Region: Centre-Val de Loire
- Department: Cher
- Arrondissement: Bourges
- Canton: Avord

Government
  - Mayor (2020–2026): Aurélie Garnaud
- Area^{1}: 10.05 km^{2} (3.88 sq mi)
- Elevation: 180 m (590 ft)
- Highest elevation: 195 m (640 ft)
- Lowest elevation: 157 m (515 ft)
- Population (2023): 362
  - Density: 36.0/km^{2} (93.3/sq mi)
- Time zone: UTC+01:00 (CET)
  - Summer (DST): UTC+02:00 (CEST)
- INSEE/Postal code: 18220 /18140
- ^{1} French Land Register data, which excludes lakes, ponds, glaciers > 1 km^{2} (0.386 sq mi or 247 acres) and river estuaries.

Saint-Léger-le-Petit (French pronunciation: [sɛ̃ leʒe lə pəti]) is a commune in the Cher department in central France.

== Geography ==
The commune is located at the eastern end of the Cher département, on the banks of the Loire, the natural border with the Nièvre. It is surrounded by the communes of Beffes to the south and Argenvières to the north. Saint-Léger-le-Petit is a large, rural commune, comprising a village and a number of “lieux-dits”.

== Population ==
Historical population
| Year | Pop. | ±% p.a. |
|---|---|---|
| 1968 | 438 | — |
| 1975 | 386 | −1.79% |
| 1982 | 324 | −2.47% |
| 1990 | 330 | +0.23% |
| 1999 | 352 | +0.72% |
| 2007 | 392 | +1.35% |
| 2012 | 378 | −0.72% |
| 2017 | 355 | −1.25% |
| 2023 | 362 | +0.33% |
Source: INSEE

== Urban planning ==
Typology

Saint-Léger-le-Petit is a rural commune. It is one of the communes with low or very low population density, as defined by the Insee communal density grid.

The commune is also part of the Nevers catchment area, of which it is an outlying commune. This area, which comprises 93 communes, is categorized as having between 50,000 and less than 200,000 inhabitants.

=== Land use ===
The commune's land use, as revealed by the European biophysical land cover database Corine Land Cover (CLC), is marked by the importance of agricultural land (61.5% in 2018), a proportion identical to that of 1990 (61.5%). The detailed breakdown in 2018 is as follows: arable land (42.5%), forests (36.8%), heterogeneous agricultural areas (11.5%), grasslands (7.5%), urbanized areas (1.3%), continental waters (0.4%), shrub and/or herbaceous vegetation (0.1%).

The evolution of the commune's land use and infrastructure can be observed on various cartographic representations of the territory: the Cassini map (18th century), the staff map (1820-1866) and IGN maps or aerial photos for the current period (1950 to present).

== See also ==
- Communes of the Cher department
