= Saligny-le-Vif =

- Part of Baugy
- Location of Saligny-le-Vif
- Location within France Location within Centre-Val de Loire
- Coordinates: 47°02′47″N 2°46′02″E
- Country: France
- Region: Centre-Val de Loire
- Department: Cher
- Arrondissement: Bourges
- Canton: Avord
- Commune: Baugy
- Area^{1}: 15.29 km^{2} (5.90 sq mi)
- Elevation: 224 m (735 ft)
- Highest elevation: 227 m (745 ft)
- Lowest elevation: 174 m (571 ft)
- Population (2019): 185
  - Density: 12.1/km^{2} (31.3/sq mi)
- Time zone: UTC+01:00 (CET)
  - Summer (DST): UTC+02:00 (CEST)
- Postal code: 18800
- ^{1} French Land Register data, which excludes lakes, ponds, glaciers > 1 km^{2} (0.386 sq mi or 247 acres) and river estuaries.

Saligny-le-Vif (French pronunciation: [saliɲi lə vif]) is a former commune in the Cher department in the Centre-Val de Loire region of France. On 1 January 2019, it was merged into the commune Baugy.

== Geography ==
A farming area comprising a small village and a few hamlets situated in the valley of the river Yèvre, about 17 miles (27 km) southeast of Bourges, at the junction of the D42, D103 and the D72 roads.

== Sights ==
- The church of St. Pierre, dating from the twelfth century.
- A feudal motte.

== See also ==
- Communes of the Cher department
