= Chaumoux-Marcilly =

- Commune
- Location of Chaumoux-Marcilly
- Location within France Location within Centre-Val de Loire
- Coordinates: 47°07′30″N 2°46′42″E
- Country: France
- Region: Centre-Val de Loire
- Department: Cher
- Arrondissement: Bourges
- Canton: Avord
- Intercommunality: CC La Septaine

Government
  - Mayor (2020–2026): Dominique Loradoux
- Area^{1}: 16.72 km^{2} (6.46 sq mi)
- Elevation: 197 m (646 ft)
- Highest elevation: 269 m (883 ft)
- Lowest elevation: 175 m (574 ft)
- Population (2023): 82
  - Density: 4.9/km^{2} (13/sq mi)
- Time zone: UTC+01:00 (CET)
  - Summer (DST): UTC+02:00 (CEST)
- INSEE/Postal code: 18061 /18140
- ^{1} French Land Register data, which excludes lakes, ponds, glaciers > 1 km^{2} (0.386 sq mi or 247 acres) and river estuaries.

Chaumoux-Marcilly is a commune in the Cher department in the Centre-Val de Loire region of France.

== Geography ==
A small farming village situated some 17 miles (27 km) east of Bourges at the junction of the N151 with the D10 and D232 roads.

== Population ==
Historical population
Year	Pop.	±% p.a.
1968	157	—
1975	140	−1.62%
1982	92	−5.82%
1990	112	+2.49%
1999	101	−1.14%
2007	103	+0.25%
2012	100	−0.59%
2017	95	−1.02%
2023	82	−2.42%
Source: INSEE

== Sights ==
- The church of St. Radegonde, dating from the nineteenth century.
- The fifteenth-century chateau.

== See also ==
- Communes of the Cher department
