= Étréchy, Cher =

Étréchy
- Commune
- Location of Étréchy
- Location within France Location within Centre-Val de Loire
- Coordinates: 47°09′47″N 2°43′33″E
- Country: France
- Region: Centre-Val de Loire
- Department: Cher
- Arrondissement: Bourges
- Canton: Avord
- Intercommunality: CC La Septaine

Government
  - Mayor (2020–2026): Jean-Pierre Chassiot
- Area^{1}: 31.88 km^{2} (12.31 sq mi)
- Elevation: 205 m (673 ft)
- Highest elevation: 254 m (833 ft)
- Lowest elevation: 171 m (561 ft)
- Population (2023): 408
  - Density: 12.8/km^{2} (33.1/sq mi)
- Time zone: UTC+01:00 (CET)
  - Summer (DST): UTC+02:00 (CEST)
- INSEE/Postal code: 18090 /18800
- ^{1} French Land Register data, which excludes lakes, ponds, glaciers > 1 km^{2} (0.386 sq mi or 247 acres) and river estuaries.

Étréchy (French pronunciation: [etʁeʃi]) is a commune in the Cher department in the Centre-Val de Loire region of France.

== Geography ==
A farming area consisting of the village and a couple of hamlets situated some 15 miles (24 km) northeast of Bourges, at the junction of the D158 with the D52, D36 and D93 roads.

== Population ==
Historical population
Year	Pop.	±% p.a.
1968	596	—
1975	487	−2.84%
1982	448	−1.19%
1990	453	+0.14%
1999	419	−0.86%
2007	421	+0.06%
2012	439	+0.84%
2017	456	+0.76%
2023	408	−1.84%
Source: INSEE

== Sights ==
- The church of St. Germain, dating from the thirteenth century.
- The chateau of Astilly, dating from the fifteenth century.

== See also ==
- Communes of the Cher department
