= Osmoy, Cher =

Osmoy
- Commune
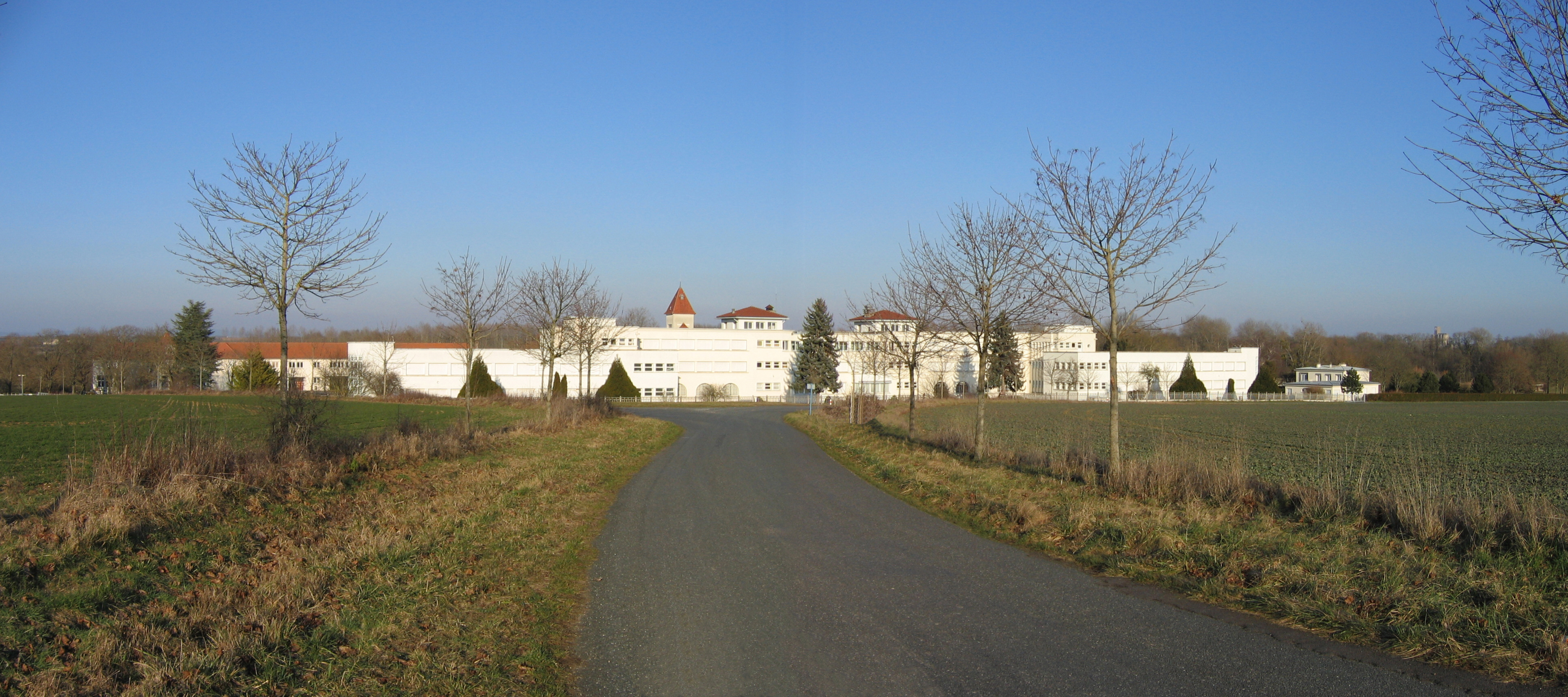
- National Police Orphanage built in 1921
- Location of Osmoy
- Location within France Location within Centre-Val de Loire
- Coordinates: 47°04′27″N 2°31′25″E
- Country: France
- Region: Centre-Val de Loire
- Department: Cher
- Arrondissement: Bourges
- Canton: Avord
- Intercommunality: La Septaine

Government
  - Mayor (2020–2026): Eric Charoy
- Area^{1}: 22.63 km^{2} (8.74 sq mi)
- Elevation: 140 m (460 ft)
- Highest elevation: 172 m (564 ft)
- Lowest elevation: 132 m (433 ft)
- Population (2023): 291
  - Density: 12.9/km^{2} (33.3/sq mi)
- Time zone: UTC+01:00 (CET)
  - Summer (DST): UTC+02:00 (CEST)
- INSEE/Postal code: 18174 /18390
- ^{1} French Land Register data, which excludes lakes, ponds, glaciers > 1 km^{2} (0.386 sq mi or 247 acres) and river estuaries.

Osmoy is a commune in the Cher department in the Centre-Val de Loire region of France.

== Geography ==
A farming area comprising a small village and a few hamlets situated by the banks of the river Yèvre, some 5 miles (8.0 km) east of Bourges, at the junction of the D46 with the D179 and the D976 roads. It is home to the national police orphanage.

== Population ==
Historical population
Year	Pop.	±% p.a.
1968	264	—
1975	228	−2.07%
1982	210	−1.17%
1990	265	+2.95%
1999	288	+0.93%
2007	189	−5.13%
2012	326	+11.52%
2017	269	−3.77%
2023	291	+1.32%
Source: INSEE

== See also ==
- Communes of the Cher department
