= Sévry =

- Commune
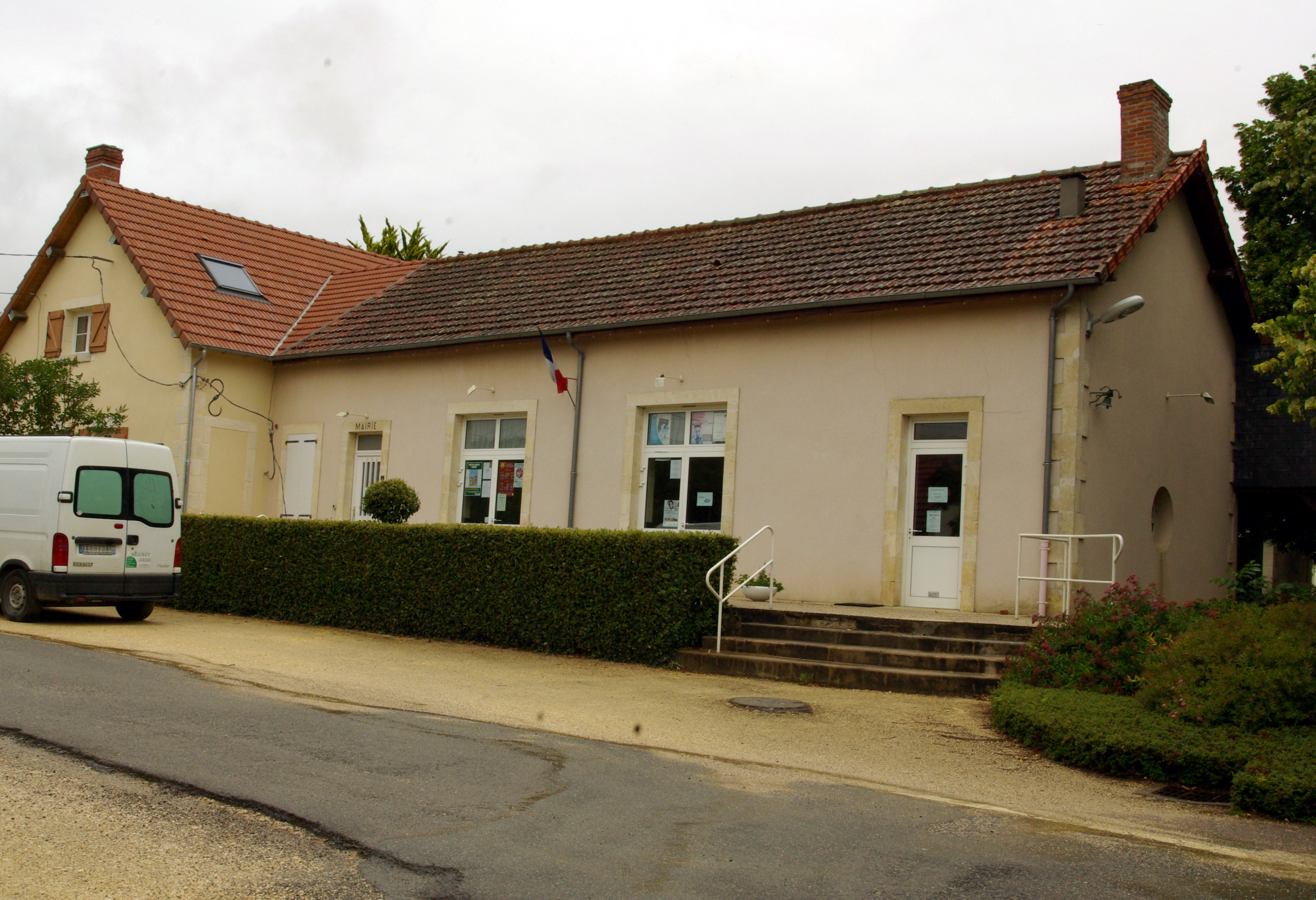
- Town hall
- Location of Sévry
- Location within France Location within Centre-Val de Loire
- Coordinates: 47°07′59″N 2°48′17″E
- Country: France
- Region: Centre-Val de Loire
- Department: Cher
- Arrondissement: Bourges
- Canton: Avord

Government
  - Mayor (2020–2026): Jean-Paul Dousset
- Area^{1}: 9.04 km^{2} (3.49 sq mi)
- Elevation: 190 m (620 ft)
- Highest elevation: 231 m (758 ft)
- Lowest elevation: 184 m (604 ft)
- Population (2023): 65
  - Density: 7.2/km^{2} (19/sq mi)
- Time zone: UTC+01:00 (CET)
  - Summer (DST): UTC+02:00 (CEST)
- INSEE/Postal code: 18251 /18140
- ^{1} French Land Register data, which excludes lakes, ponds, glaciers > 1 km^{2} (0.386 sq mi or 247 acres) and river estuaries.

Sévry (French pronunciation: [sevʁi]) is a commune in the Cher department in the Centre-Val de Loire region of France.

== Geography ==
A very small farming village situated about 24 miles (39 km) east of Bourges at the junction of the D72e with the D126 and the N151 roads.

== Population ==
Historical population
Year	Pop.	±% p.a.
1968	78	—
1975	58	−4.14%
1982	69	+2.51%
1990	57	−2.36%
1999	73	+2.79%
2007	71	−0.35%
2012	76	+1.37%
2017	62	−3.99%
2023	65	+0.79%
Source: INSEE

== Sights ==
- Traces of the demolished church.
- The chateau of Sévry.

== See also ==
- Communes of the Cher department
