= Chassy, Cher =

Chassy
- Commune
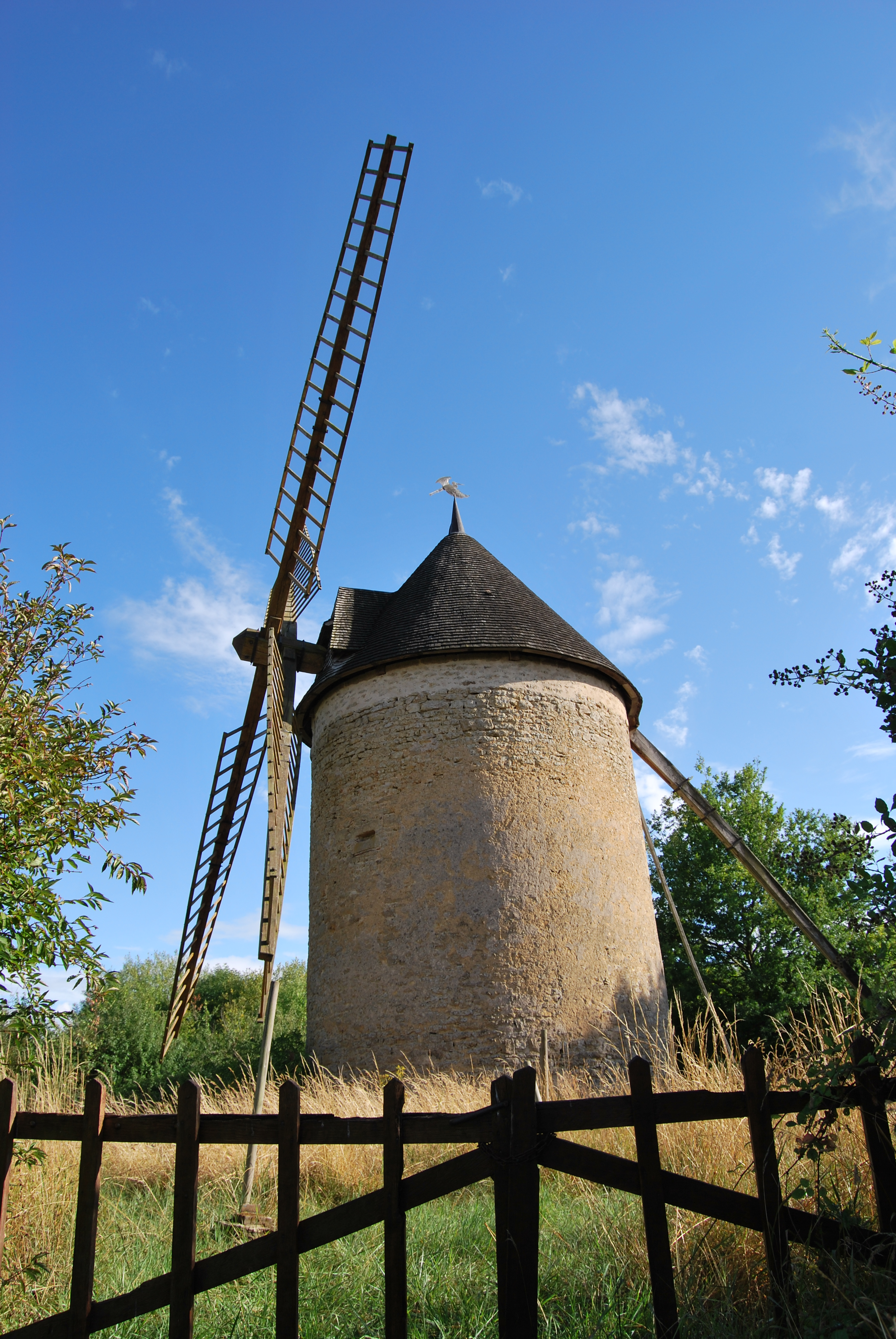
- The Villiers windmill
- Location of Chassy
- Location within France Location within Centre-Val de Loire
- Coordinates: 47°02′33″N 2°50′13″E
- Country: France
- Region: Centre-Val de Loire
- Department: Cher
- Arrondissement: Bourges
- Canton: Avord
- Intercommunality: Pays de Nérondes

Government
  - Mayor (2020–2026): David Souchet
- Area^{1}: 17.76 km^{2} (6.86 sq mi)
- Elevation: 200 m (660 ft)
- Highest elevation: 252 m (827 ft)
- Lowest elevation: 175 m (574 ft)
- Population (2023): 233
  - Density: 13.1/km^{2} (34.0/sq mi)
- Time zone: UTC+01:00 (CET)
  - Summer (DST): UTC+02:00 (CEST)
- INSEE/Postal code: 18056 /18800
- ^{1} French Land Register data, which excludes lakes, ponds, glaciers > 1 km^{2} (0.386 sq mi or 247 acres) and river estuaries.

Chassy (French pronunciation: [ʃasi]) is a commune in the Cher department in the Centre-Val de Loire region of France.

== Geography ==
A farming village with one hamlet situated some 19 miles (31 km) east of Bourges at the junction of the D12 with the D6 and D6e roads. The river Vauvise forms most of the commune's southern border before entering the territory of the neighbouring commune of Laverdines, then flows back north through the northwestern part of the commune.

== Population ==
Historical population
| Year | Pop. | ±% p.a. |
|---|---|---|
| 1968 | 316 | — |
| 1975 | 278 | −1.81% |
| 1982 | 231 | −2.61% |
| 1990 | 203 | −1.60% |
| 1999 | 229 | +1.35% |
| 2007 | 257 | +1.45% |
| 2012 | 252 | −0.39% |
| 2017 | 241 | −0.89% |
| 2023 | 233 | −0.56% |
Source: INSEE

== Sights ==
- The church of Notre-Dame, dating from the twelfth century.
- The sixteenth-century chateau de Villiers, with a windmill.
- A seventeenth-century stone cross.

== See also ==
- Communes of the Cher department
