= Pierre Paoli =

French agent in the Gestapo

Pierre-Marie Paoli
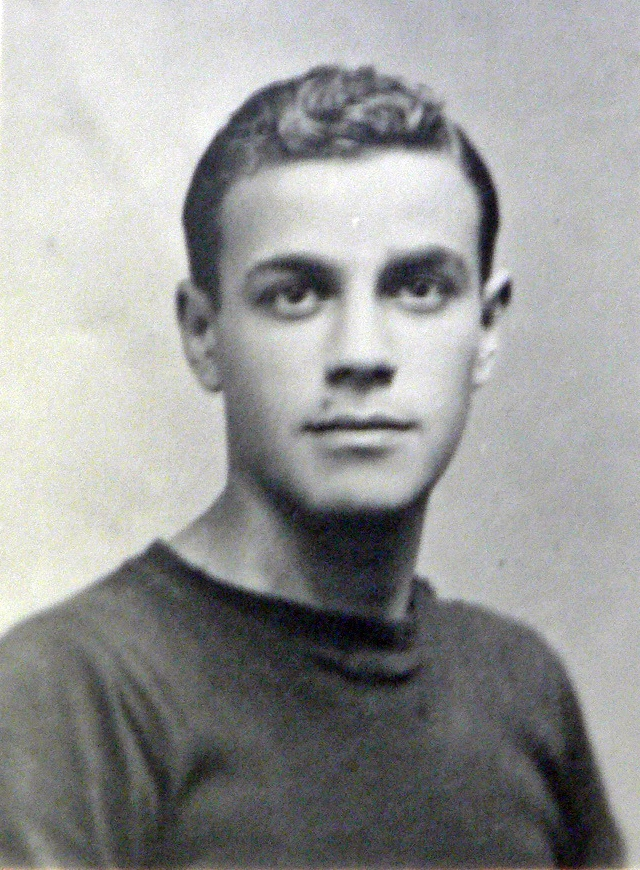
- Gestapo agent Paoli
- Born: 31 December 1921; Aubigny-sur-Nère, France
- Died: 15 June 1946 (aged 24); Bourges, France
- Cause of death: Execution by firing squad
- Other name: Lamote
- Known for: Torturer
- Status: Executed
- Conviction: Treason
- Penalty: Death
- SS service
- Allegiance: Nazi Germany
- Branch: Schutzstaffel
- Rank: SS-Scharführer
- Nicknames: The monster (Le monstre); Sinister Paoli (le sinistre Paoli)

Pierre-Marie Paoli, also known as Lamote, (31 December 1921 – 15 June 1946) was a French agent in the Gestapo. The Gestapo (Secret State Police) was the official secret police of Nazi Germany and German-occupied Europe.

== Biography ==
Pierre-Marie Paoli was born on 31 December 1921 in Aubigny-sur-Nère, France to a middle-class family, his father came from Algajola in Corsica. Pierre Paoli attended public school. In October 1937 he obtained a job with the town of Aubigny, Allier as a clerk. Later he became the town's administrative assistant and later on 1 May 1938, became the Treasury of the town Mehun-sur-Yèvre, at age 17 years old. He then left his family to take the job at Mehun-sur-Yèvre.

When war in Europe was declared in September 1939, he decided to return to Aubigny for a short time, and then moved to Paris where he worked odd jobs. One of his odd jobs was as a bicycle messenger on behalf of the Nazi German Admiralty. In January 1942 Paoli then moved to Bourges. On 31 March 1943 he was hired as interpreter at the Gestapo HQ in Bourges. The Germans offered him a room in the local Gestapo HQ to stay. He was put in charge of Gestapo section 4A over Berry province, the department in Cher that fought against the Communists. But after a short time, he is given freedom of action and autonomy to hunt anyone thought to be anti-Nazi. He became a trusted agent of the Sicherheitsdienst (SD), and led numerous operations against the French Resistance. He obtained the SS rank of Scharführer and was given German citizenship. He arrested over 300 people and deported many to camps as part of the Final Solution. He was known for his cruelty and torture of people during interrogation. He stripped his victims and seize their valuables. He even tortured Senator Marcel Plaisant. Anyone arrested by Paoli was either killed by the Gestapo in Bourges or sent to a Nazi concentration camp.

The French Gestapo also were part of the "roundup of Beffes" on 30 April 1944. It was two nights of raids conducted on 21 and 22 July 1944. Seventy-one Jewish refugees were arrested and sent to Saint-Amand-Montrond. Over the following days, Paoli participated in the tragedy of the Guerry's wells, where 36 Jews were massacred on the site of the abandoned Guerry Farm and their bodies were thrown into three wells. Mr. Krameisen was one of the few survivors of the raid and told the US Army soldiers about the raid and Paoli's involvement.

Given Allied troops were nearby, Paoli evacuated Bourges on 6 August 1944. He was arrested by British forces at Flensburg near the Danish border on 16 May 1945. He was handed over to French authorities in January 1946 and brought back to Bourges for trial.

He was brought to trial as a traitor on 3 May 1946; his nickname in the town was "the monster" and "sinister Paoli". Mr. Krameisen gave testimony at the trial. There was public outrage over the exposure of his atrocities. At his trial he declared: "I'm not French, but German". He was sentenced to death and on 15 June 1946 he was executed in Bourges.

== In popular culture ==
- Jean Lyonnet. L'Affaire Paoli (The Case Paoli) (Chassaing Publishing, 1964). Testimony by Marc Toledano Paoli, in the account he devotes to the monk Alois Stanke, charitable German jailer of the prison Bourges: The Franciscan of Bourges (Flammarion, 1969).
- The historical novel of Jacques Gimard: Trompe-la-mort - les cahiers secrets de Pierre Paoli, agent français de la Gestapo (Cheat Death, secret notebooks Pierre Paoli, secret Gestapo agent (Editions Qui Lit Vit, June 2011) - The book draws on the sources of court records of the trial Paoli and restores testimonials unpublished collected from people who surrounded this Gestapo Berry.
