= Farges-en-Septaine =

- Commune
- Location of Farges-en-Septaine
- Location within France Location within Centre-Val de Loire
- Coordinates: 47°04′27″N 2°39′02″E
- Country: France
- Region: Centre-Val de Loire
- Department: Cher
- Arrondissement: Bourges
- Canton: Avord
- Intercommunality: La Septaine

Government
  - Mayor (2020–2026): Alain Jaubert
- Area^{1}: 24.48 km^{2} (9.45 sq mi)
- Elevation: 181 m (594 ft)
- Highest elevation: 181 m (594 ft)
- Lowest elevation: 144 m (472 ft)
- Population (2023): 1,023
  - Density: 41.79/km^{2} (108.2/sq mi)
- Time zone: UTC+01:00 (CET)
  - Summer (DST): UTC+02:00 (CEST)
- INSEE/Postal code: 18092 /18800
- ^{1} French Land Register data, which excludes lakes, ponds, glaciers > 1 km^{2} (0.386 sq mi or 247 acres) and river estuaries.

Farges-en-Septaine (French pronunciation: [faʁʒ ɑ̃ sɛptɛn]) is a commune in the Cher department in the Centre-Val de Loire region of France.

== Geography ==
A farming area comprising the village and a couple of hamlets bordered by the banks of both the Villabon and Yèvre rivers, some 19 miles (31 km) east of Bourges, at the junction of the D98, D66 and the D36 roads. Much of the infrastructure of Avord Air Base is contained within the southern part of the commune.

== Population ==
Historical population
Year	Pop.	±% p.a.
1968	635	—
1975	543	−2.21%
1982	566	+0.59%
1990	691	+2.53%
1999	737	+0.72%
2007	916	+2.76%
2012	1,035	+2.47%
2017	1,009	−0.51%
2023	1,023	+0.23%
Source: INSEE

== Sights ==
- The church of Notre-Dame, dating from the twelfth century.
- The seventeenth-century chateau of Bois-Bouzon.

== See also ==
- Communes of the Cher department
