= Communauté de communes de la Septaine =

History

la Septaine
- Communauté de communes
- Country: France
- Region: Centre-Val de Loire
- Department: Cher
- No. of communes: {{{nbcomm}}}
- Established: 15 December 1999
- Area: 391.54 km^{2} (151.17 sq mi)
- Population (2018): 10,774
  - Density: 27.517/km^{2} (71.269/sq mi)

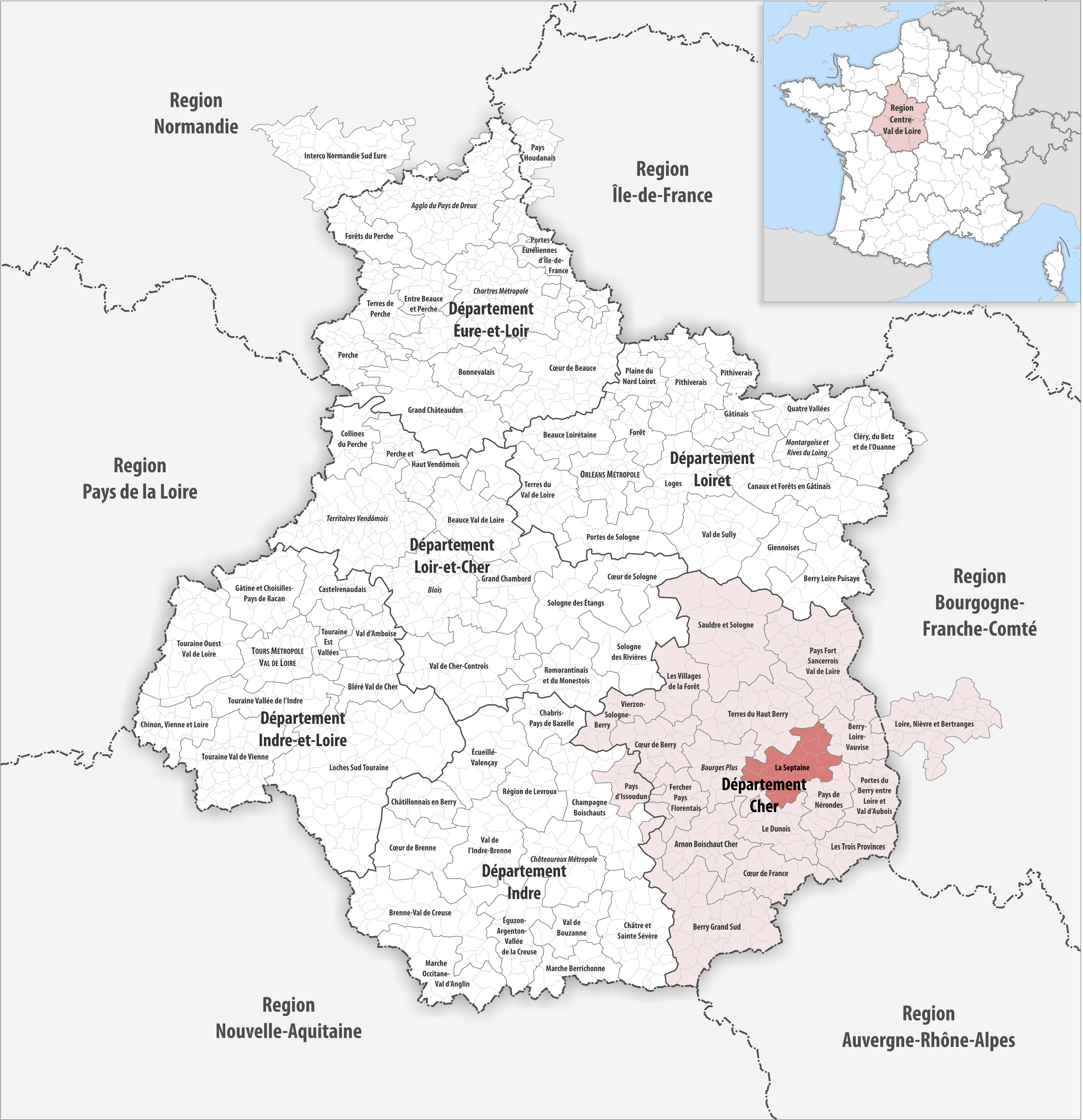
Situation de l'association communale La Septaine

The communauté de communes de la Septaine is located in the Cher département of the Centre-Val de Loire region of France. It was established on 15 December 1999. Its seat is Avord. Its area is 391.5 km^{2}, and its population was 10,774 in 2018.

The communauté de communes consists of the following 15 communes:

1. Avord
2. Baugy
3. Chaumoux-Marcilly
4. Crosses
5. Étréchy
6. Farges-en-Septaine
7. Gron
8. Jussy-Champagne
9. Nohant-en-Goût
10. Osmoy
11. Savigny-en-Septaine
12. Soye-en-Septaine
13. Villabon
14. Villequiers
15. Vornay
