= Crosses, Cher =

Crosses
- Commune
- Location of Crosses
- Location within France Location within Centre-Val de Loire
- Coordinates: 47°00′41″N 2°34′57″E
- Country: France
- Region: Centre-Val de Loire
- Department: Cher
- Arrondissement: Bourges
- Canton: Avord
- Intercommunality: La Septaine

Government
  - Mayor (2020–2026): Isabelle Surgent
- Area^{1}: 26.49 km^{2} (10.23 sq mi)
- Elevation: 150 m (490 ft)
- Highest elevation: 179 m (587 ft)
- Lowest elevation: 142 m (466 ft)
- Population (2023): 375
  - Density: 14.2/km^{2} (36.7/sq mi)
- Time zone: UTC+01:00 (CET)
  - Summer (DST): UTC+02:00 (CEST)
- INSEE/Postal code: 18081 /18340
- ^{1} French Land Register data, which excludes lakes, ponds, glaciers > 1 km^{2} (0.386 sq mi or 247 acres) and river estuaries.

Crosses (French pronunciation: [kʁɔs]) is a commune in the Cher department in the Centre-Val de Loire region of France.

== Geography ==
Crosses is a farming village situated some 28 miles (45 km) north of Bourges at the junction of the D15 with the D71 and D66 roads. The river Airain flows north through the middle of the village.

== Population ==
Historical population
Year	Pop.	±% p.a.
1968	279	—
1975	240	−2.13%
1982	247	+0.41%
1990	299	+2.42%
1999	304	+0.18%
2007	310	+0.24%
2012	352	+2.57%
2017	391	+2.12%
2023	375	−0.69%
Source: INSEE

== Sights ==
- The church of St. Martin, dating from the twelfth century.
- The chateau of Sonpize.

== See also ==
- Communes of the Cher department
