= Nohant-en-Goût =

- Commune
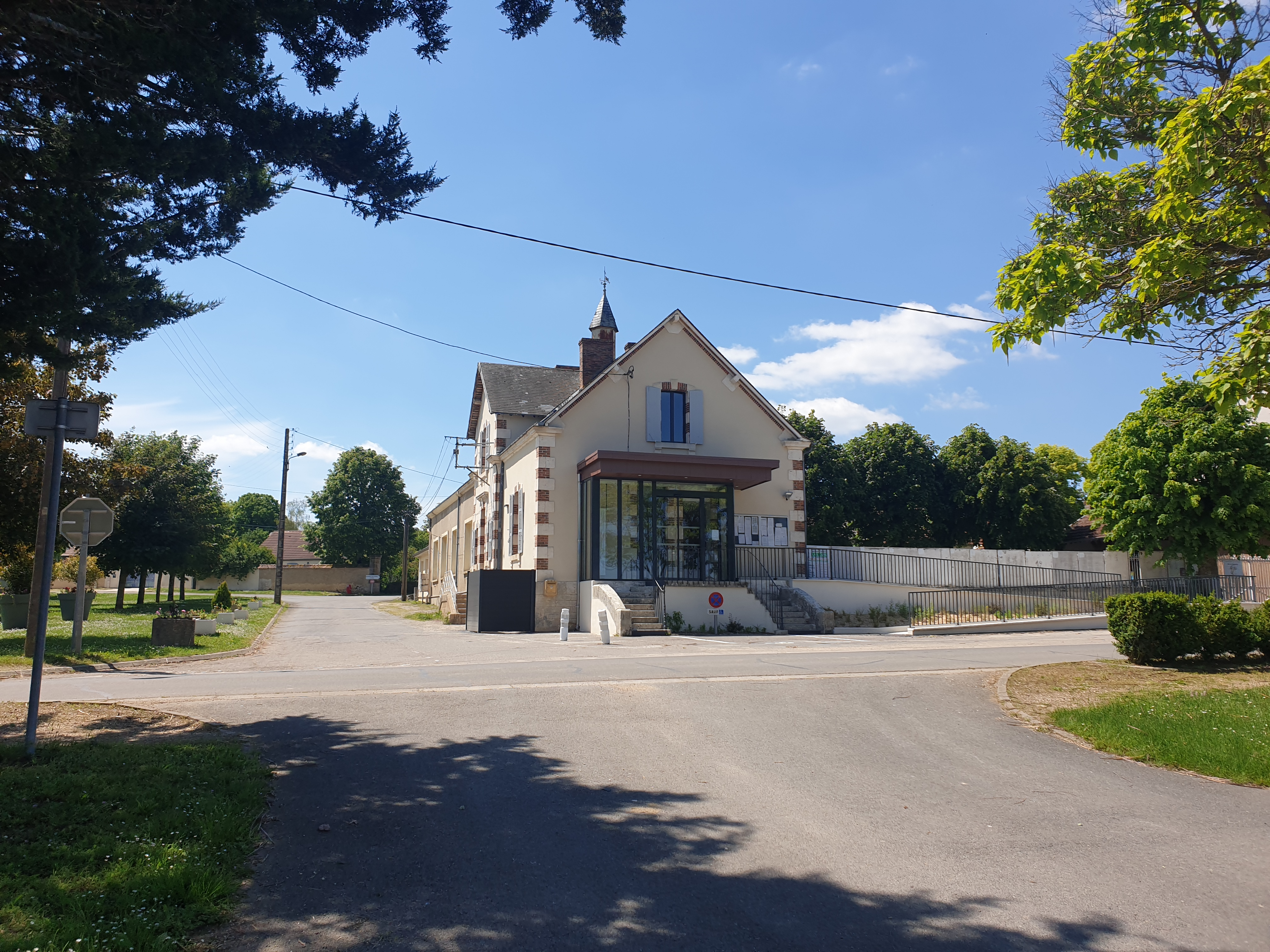
- Town hall
- Location of Nohant-en-Goût
- Location within France Location within Centre-Val de Loire
- Coordinates: 47°06′00″N 2°34′16″E
- Country: France
- Region: Centre-Val de Loire
- Department: Cher
- Arrondissement: Bourges
- Canton: Avord
- Intercommunality: La Septaine

Government
  - Mayor (2020–2026): Joanny Allegaert
- Area^{1}: 24.79 km^{2} (9.57 sq mi)
- Elevation: 166 m (545 ft)
- Highest elevation: 179 m (587 ft)
- Lowest elevation: 134 m (440 ft)
- Population (2023): 548
  - Density: 22.1/km^{2} (57.3/sq mi)
- Time zone: UTC+01:00 (CET)
  - Summer (DST): UTC+02:00 (CEST)
- INSEE/Postal code: 18166 /18390
- ^{1} French Land Register data, which excludes lakes, ponds, glaciers > 1 km^{2} (0.386 sq mi or 247 acres) and river estuaries.

Nohant-en-Goût (French pronunciation: [nɔ.ɑ̃ ɑ̃ ɡu]) is a commune in the Cher department in the Centre-Val de Loire region of France.

== Geography ==
A farming area comprising the village and a couple of hamlets situated by the banks of the river Tripande, some 13 kilometres (8 mi) east of Bourges, at the junction of the N151 with the N98 and the D186 roads.

== Population ==
Historical population
Year	Pop.	±% p.a.
1968	244	—
1975	277	+1.83%
1982	374	+4.38%
1990	372	−0.07%
1999	429	+1.60%
2007	548	+3.11%
2012	570	+0.79%
2017	600	+1.03%
2023	548	−1.50%
Source: INSEE

== Sights ==
- The church of St. Blaise and the war memorial.
- Vestiges of an old church, dating from the twelfth century.
- The fifteenth-century chateau du Préau.
- Traces of an old castle at La Motte.

== See also ==
- Communes of the Cher department
