= Vornay =

- Commune
- Coat of arms
- Location of Vornay
- Location within France Location within Centre-Val de Loire
- Coordinates: 46°58′27″N 2°35′03″E
- Country: France
- Region: Centre-Val de Loire
- Department: Cher
- Arrondissement: Bourges
- Canton: Avord
- Intercommunality: La Septaine

Government
  - Mayor (2020–2026): Olivier Dubois
- Area^{1}: 26.35 km^{2} (10.17 sq mi)
- Elevation: 175 m (574 ft)
- Highest elevation: 183 m (600 ft)
- Lowest elevation: 150 m (490 ft)
- Population (2023): 584
  - Density: 22.2/km^{2} (57.4/sq mi)
- Time zone: UTC+01:00 (CET)
  - Summer (DST): UTC+02:00 (CEST)
- INSEE/Postal code: 18289 /18130
- ^{1} French Land Register data, which excludes lakes, ponds, glaciers > 1 km^{2} (0.386 sq mi or 247 acres) and river estuaries.

Vornay (French pronunciation: [vɔʁnɛ]) is a commune in the Cher department in the Centre-Val de Loire region of France.

== Geography ==
A farming area comprising the village and a couple of hamlets situated about 13 miles (21 km) southeast of Bourges, at the junction of the D119 with the D66 and D166 roads. The village lies in the northern part of the commune, on the right bank of the Airain, which flows northwest through the commune, where it is joined by the river Craon.

== Population ==
Historical population
Year	Pop.	±% p.a.
1968	403	—
1975	355	−1.80%
1982	341	−0.57%
1990	469	+4.06%
1999	446	−0.56%
2007	512	+1.74%
2012	592	+2.95%
2017	593	+0.03%
2023	584	−0.25%
Source: INSEE

== See also ==
- Communes of the Cher department
