= Jussy-Champagne =

- Commune
- Coat of arms
- Location of Jussy-Champagne
- Location within France Location within Centre-Val de Loire
- Coordinates: 46°59′06″N 2°38′38″E
- Country: France
- Region: Centre-Val de Loire
- Department: Cher
- Arrondissement: Bourges
- Canton: Avord
- Intercommunality: La Septaine

Government
  - Mayor (2020–2026): Bénédicte Ducateau
- Area^{1}: 27.3 km^{2} (10.5 sq mi)
- Elevation: 180 m (590 ft)
- Highest elevation: 194 m (636 ft)
- Lowest elevation: 162 m (531 ft)
- Population (2023): 205
  - Density: 7.51/km^{2} (19.4/sq mi)
- Time zone: UTC+01:00 (CET)
  - Summer (DST): UTC+02:00 (CEST)
- INSEE/Postal code: 18119 /18130
- ^{1} French Land Register data, which excludes lakes, ponds, glaciers > 1 km^{2} (0.386 sq mi or 247 acres) and river estuaries.

Jussy-Champagne (French pronunciation: [ʒysi ʃɑ̃paɲ]) is a commune in the Cher department in the Centre-Val de Loire region of France.

== Geography ==
Jussy-Champagne is an area of forestry and farming, comprising the village and several hamlets situated in the valley of the river Craon, some 15 miles (24 km) southeast of Bourges, at the junction of the D19, D15 and the D367 roads.

== Population ==
Historical population
Year	Pop.	±% p.a.
1968	176	—
1975	240	+4.53%
1982	247	+0.41%
1990	226	−1.10%
1999	265	+1.78%
2007	224	−2.08%
2012	215	−0.82%
2017	194	−2.03%
2023	205	+0.92%
Source: INSEE

== Sights ==
- The church of St. André, dating from the twelfth century.
- A sixteenth-century chateau.
- A watermill.

== See also ==
- Communes of the Cher department
