= Avord =

- Commune
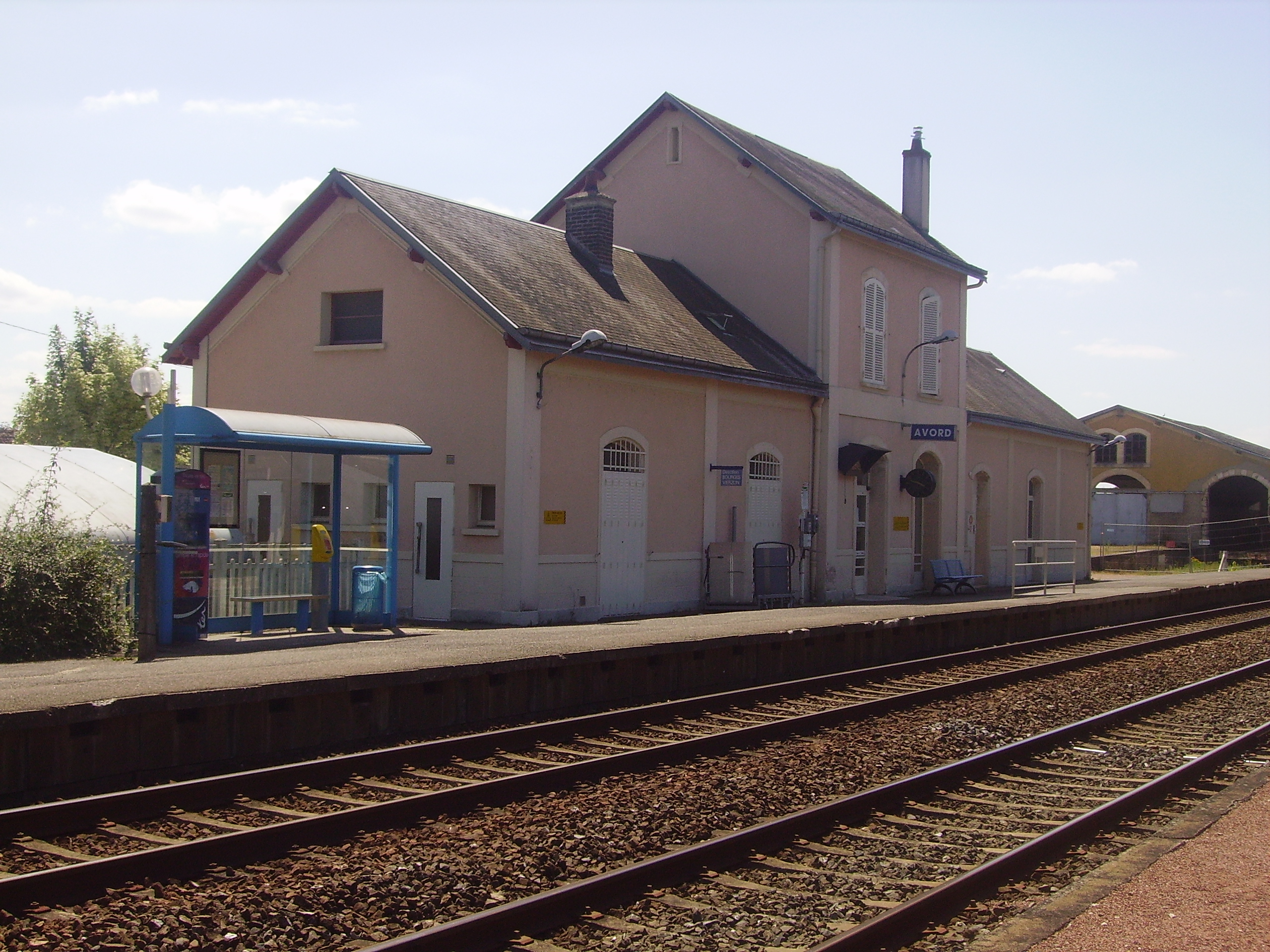
- Train station

- Coat of arms
- Location of Avord
- Location within France Location within Centre-Val de Loire
- Coordinates: 47°02′02″N 2°39′15″E
- Country: France
- Region: Centre-Val de Loire
- Department: Cher
- Arrondissement: Bourges
- Canton: Avord
- Intercommunality: CC Septaine

Government
  - Mayor (2020–2026): Alain Blanchard
- Area^{1}: 27.98 km^{2} (10.80 sq mi)
- Elevation: 173 m (568 ft)
- Highest elevation: 196 m (643 ft)
- Lowest elevation: 147 m (482 ft)
- Population (2023): 2,909
  - Density: 104.0/km^{2} (269.3/sq mi)
- Time zone: UTC+01:00 (CET)
  - Summer (DST): UTC+02:00 (CEST)
- INSEE/Postal code: 18018 /18520
- ^{1} French Land Register data, which excludes lakes, ponds, glaciers > 1 km^{2} (0.386 sq mi or 247 acres) and river estuaries.

Avord (French pronunciation: [avɔʁ]) is a commune in the Cher department in the Centre-Val de Loire region of France. It is 20 kilometres (12 mi) east of Bourges, by the banks of the river Yèvre. The commune is home to Avord Air Base, the second largest French Air and Space Force base.

== Population ==
Historical population
Year	Pop.	±% p.a.
1968	2,132	—
1975	2,350	+1.40%
1982	2,492	+0.84%
1990	2,079	−2.24%
1999	2,334	+1.29%
2007	2,602	+1.37%
2012	2,769	+1.25%
2017	2,613	−1.15%
2023	2,909	+1.80%
Source: INSEE

== Notable people ==
- Élisabeth Catez, Roman Catholic saint, born on the military base in 1880.
- Georges Madon, World War I pilot, trained at the air force base now named for him.

== Twin town ==
Aindling, Germany since 1977.

== Climate ==
Climate data for Avord (1991–2020 averages)
Month	Jan	Feb	Mar	Apr	May	Jun	Jul	Aug	Sep	Oct	Nov	Dec	Year
Record high °C (°F)	18.2 (64.8)	22.6 (72.7)	28.8 (83.8)	29.0 (84.2)	32.2 (90.0)	38.5 (101.3)	40.9 (105.6)	39.8 (103.6)	36.0 (96.8)	32.2 (90.0)	24.3 (75.7)	20.6 (69.1)	40.9 (105.6)
Mean daily maximum °C (°F)	7.2 (45.0)	8.8 (47.8)	13.0 (55.4)	16.2 (61.2)	20.0 (68.0)	23.7 (74.7)	26.2 (79.2)	26.2 (79.2)	22.0 (71.6)	17.1 (62.8)	11.1 (52.0)	7.8 (46.0)	16.6 (61.9)
Daily mean °C (°F)	4.3 (39.7)	4.9 (40.8)	8.1 (46.6)	10.7 (51.3)	14.5 (58.1)	18.1 (64.6)	20.2 (68.4)	20.2 (68.4)	16.4 (61.5)	12.7 (54.9)	7.7 (45.9)	4.8 (40.6)	11.9 (53.4)
Mean daily minimum °C (°F)	1.3 (34.3)	1.0 (33.8)	3.3 (37.9)	5.3 (41.5)	9.0 (48.2)	12.5 (54.5)	14.2 (57.6)	14.2 (57.6)	10.8 (51.4)	8.2 (46.8)	4.3 (39.7)	1.9 (35.4)	7.2 (45.0)
Record low °C (°F)	−21.0 (−5.8)	−19.2 (−2.6)	−12.6 (9.3)	−5.5 (22.1)	−2.4 (27.7)	1.6 (34.9)	4.9 (40.8)	3.8 (38.8)	−0.2 (31.6)	−5.7 (21.7)	−9.4 (15.1)	−17.0 (1.4)	−21.0 (−5.8)
Average precipitation mm (inches)	57.5 (2.26)	51.3 (2.02)	52.2 (2.06)	62.3 (2.45)	74.6 (2.94)	59.1 (2.33)	64.6 (2.54)	57.2 (2.25)	62.4 (2.46)	75.6 (2.98)	70.9 (2.79)	68.8 (2.71)	756.5 (29.78)
Average precipitation days (≥ 1.0 mm)	11.2	9.6	9.2	10.2	10.3	8.9	8.1	7.5	8.0	10.8	12.0	11.8	117.7
Mean monthly sunshine hours	65.4	87.5	150.3	177.7	208.4	225.1	238.0	230.5	185.1	122.9	72.8	60.6	1,824.2
Source: Meteociel

== See also ==
- Communes of the Cher department
