= Savigny-en-Septaine =

- Commune
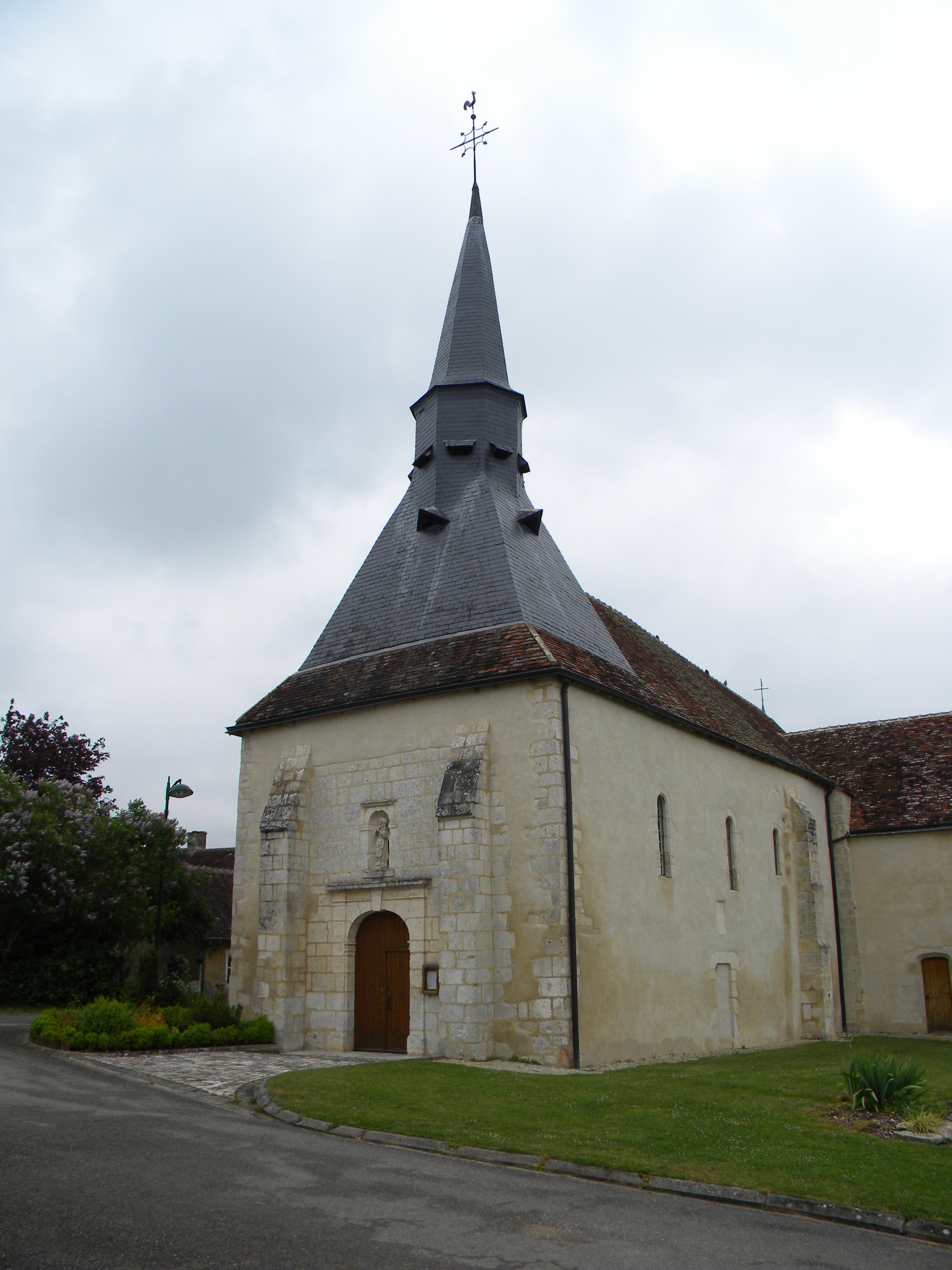
- The church in Savigny-en-Septaine

- Coat of arms
- Location of Savigny-en-Septaine
- Location within France Location within Centre-Val de Loire
- Coordinates: 47°02′42″N 2°33′41″E
- Country: France
- Region: Centre-Val de Loire
- Department: Cher
- Arrondissement: Bourges
- Canton: Avord
- Intercommunality: La Septaine

Government
  - Mayor (2020–2026): Gérard René Carlier
- Area^{1}: 22.58 km^{2} (8.72 sq mi)
- Elevation: 148 m (486 ft)
- Highest elevation: 172 m (564 ft)
- Lowest elevation: 137 m (449 ft)
- Population (2023): 685
  - Density: 30.3/km^{2} (78.6/sq mi)
- Time zone: UTC+01:00 (CET)
  - Summer (DST): UTC+02:00 (CEST)
- INSEE/Postal code: 18247 /18390
- ^{1} French Land Register data, which excludes lakes, ponds, glaciers > 1 km^{2} (0.386 sq mi or 247 acres) and river estuaries.

Savigny-en-Septaine (French pronunciation: [saviɲi ɑ̃ sɛptɛn]) is a commune in the Cher department in the Centre-Val de Loire region of France about 6 miles (9.7 km) southeast of Bourges, on the left bank of the river Airain, which flows north through the middle of the commune, then flows into the Yèvre, which forms part of the commune's northern boundary.

== History ==
In the Tragedy of the Guerry's wells in the summer of 1944 a French fascist militia murdered 36 Jews on a farm in the village.

== Population ==
Historical population
Year	Pop.	±% p.a.
1968	449	—
1975	499	+1.52%
1982	546	+1.29%
1990	570	+0.54%
1999	622	+0.97%
2007	666	+0.86%
2012	686	+0.59%
2017	712	+0.75%
2023	685	−0.64%
Source: INSEE

== See also ==
- Communes of the Cher department
