= Laverdines =

- Part of Baugy
- Location of Laverdines
- Location within France Location within Centre-Val de Loire
- Coordinates: 47°01′53″N 2°47′56″E
- Country: France
- Region: Centre-Val de Loire
- Department: Cher
- Arrondissement: Bourges
- Canton: Avord
- Commune: Baugy
- Area^{1}: 9.89 km^{2} (3.82 sq mi)
- Elevation: 215 m (705 ft)
- Highest elevation: 221 m (725 ft)
- Lowest elevation: 177 m (581 ft)
- Population (2019): 36
  - Density: 3.6/km^{2} (9.4/sq mi)
- Time zone: UTC+01:00 (CET)
  - Summer (DST): UTC+02:00 (CEST)
- Postal code: 18800
- ^{1} French Land Register data, which excludes lakes, ponds, glaciers > 1 km^{2} (0.386 sq mi or 247 acres) and river estuaries.

Laverdines (French pronunciation: [lavɛʁdin]) is a former commune in the Cher department in the Centre-Val de Loire region of France. On 1 January 2019, it was merged into the commune Baugy.

== Geography ==
A tiny farming village, situated some 16 miles (26 km) east of Bourges, at the junction of the D43 and the D72 roads. The river Vauvise flows north through the eastern part of the commune.

== Sights ==
- A nineteenth-century chapel.
- The church of St. Sylvain, dating from the twelfth century.

== See also ==
- Communes of the Cher department
