= Villabon =

- Commune
- Coat of arms
- Location of Villabon
- Location within France Location within Centre-Val de Loire
- Coordinates: 47°05′51″N 2°40′32″E
- Country: France
- Region: Centre-Val de Loire
- Department: Cher
- Arrondissement: Bourges
- Canton: Avord
- Intercommunality: CC La Septaine

Government
  - Mayor (2020–2026): Philippe Frérard
- Area^{1}: 18.28 km^{2} (7.06 sq mi)
- Elevation: 212 m (696 ft)
- Highest elevation: 220 m (720 ft)
- Lowest elevation: 163 m (535 ft)
- Population (2023): 559
  - Density: 30.6/km^{2} (79.2/sq mi)
- Time zone: UTC+01:00 (CET)
  - Summer (DST): UTC+02:00 (CEST)
- INSEE/Postal code: 18282 /18800
- ^{1} French Land Register data, which excludes lakes, ponds, glaciers > 1 km^{2} (0.386 sq mi or 247 acres) and river estuaries.

Villabon (French pronunciation: [vilabɔ̃]) is a commune in the Cher department in the Centre-Val de Loire region of France.

== Geography ==
A farming village and a hamlet situated on the banks of the small Villabon river about 12 miles (19 km) east of Bourges, at the junction of the D12, D36 and the D235 roads.

== Population ==
Historical population
Year	Pop.	±% p.a.
1968	480	—
1975	405	−2.40%
1982	462	+1.90%
1990	521	+1.51%
1999	463	−1.30%
2007	535	+1.82%
2012	561	+0.95%
2017	577	+0.56%
2023	559	−0.53%
Source: INSEE

== Sights ==
- The church dating from the nineteenth century.
- A watermill.
- The sixteenth-century chateau of Savoye.

== See also ==
- Communes of the Cher department
