= Gron, Cher =

Gron
- Commune
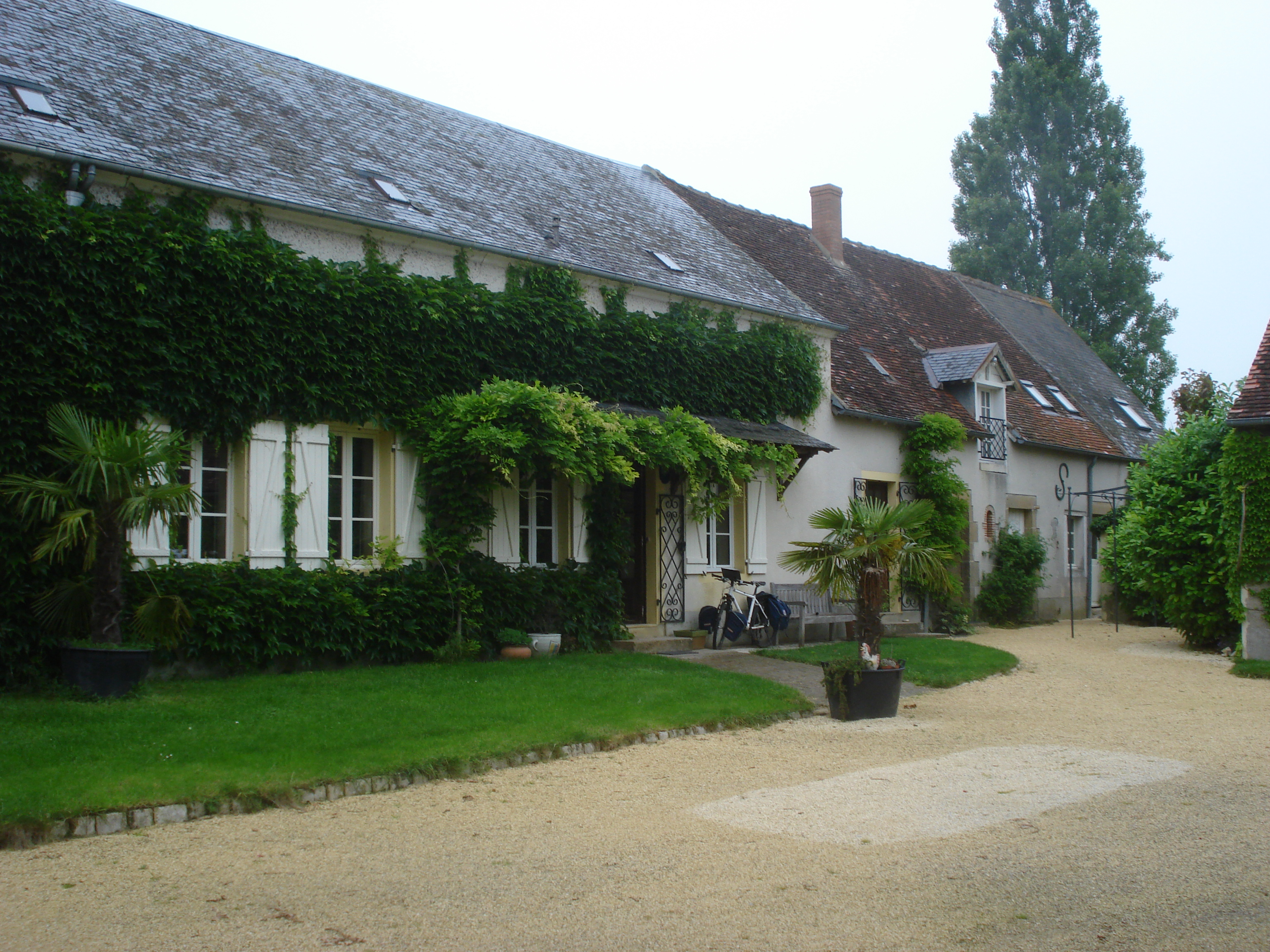
- Farmhouse
- Location of Gron
- Location within France Location within Centre-Val de Loire
- Coordinates: 47°07′20″N 2°44′31″E
- Country: France
- Region: Centre-Val de Loire
- Department: Cher
- Arrondissement: Bourges
- Canton: Avord
- Intercommunality: CC La Septaine

Government
  - Mayor (2024–2026): Philippe Naywosz Paszkiewicz
- Area^{1}: 26.22 km^{2} (10.12 sq mi)
- Highest elevation: 263 m (863 ft)
- Lowest elevation: 167 m (548 ft)
- Population (2023): 470
  - Density: 18/km^{2} (46/sq mi)
- Time zone: UTC+01:00 (CET)
  - Summer (DST): UTC+02:00 (CEST)
- INSEE/Postal code: 18105 /18800
- ^{1} French Land Register data, which excludes lakes, ponds, glaciers > 1 km^{2} (0.386 sq mi or 247 acres) and river estuaries.

Gron (French pronunciation: [ɡʁɔ̃]) is a commune in the Cher department in the[Centre-Val de Loire region of France by the banks of the Yèvre river, about 14 miles (23 km) east of Bourges, on the pilgrimage route known as St. James' Way.

== Population ==
Historical population
Year	Pop.	±% p.a.
1968	438	—
1975	365	−2.57%
1982	302	−2.67%
1990	341	+1.53%
1999	426	+2.50%
2007	448	+0.63%
2012	491	+1.85%
2017	469	−0.91%
2023	470	+0.04%
Source: INSEE

== See also ==
- Communes of the Cher department
