= Villequiers =

- Commune
- Coat of arms
- Location of Villequiers
- Location within France Location within Centre-Val de Loire
- Coordinates: 47°04′13″N 2°48′20″E
- Country: France
- Region: Centre-Val de Loire
- Department: Cher
- Arrondissement: Bourges
- Canton: Avord
- Intercommunality: CC La Septaine

Government
  - Mayor (2020–2026): Pascal Méreau
- Area^{1}: 29.49 km^{2} (11.39 sq mi)
- Elevation: 232 m (761 ft)
- Highest elevation: 216 m (709 ft)
- Lowest elevation: 174 m (571 ft)
- Population (2023): 437
  - Density: 14.8/km^{2} (38.4/sq mi)
- Time zone: UTC+01:00 (CET)
  - Summer (DST): UTC+02:00 (CEST)
- INSEE/Postal code: 18286 /18800
- ^{1} French Land Register data, which excludes lakes, ponds, glaciers > 1 km^{2} (0.386 sq mi or 247 acres) and river estuaries.

Villequiers (French pronunciation: [vilkje]) is a commune in the Cher department in the Centre-Val de Loire region of France.

== Geography ==
An area of forestry and farming area comprising the village and several hamlets situated in the valley of the river Vauvise, about 19 miles (31 km) east of Bourges, at the junction of the D12 with the D93 and D72 roads. The Vauvise flows north-northeast through the eastern part of the commune.

== Population ==
Historical population
Year	Pop.	±% p.a.
1968	534	—
1975	527	−0.19%
1982	433	−2.77%
1990	466	+0.92%
1999	446	−0.49%
2007	516	+1.84%
2012	502	−0.55%
2017	479	−0.93%
2023	437	−1.52%
Source: INSEE

== Sights ==
- The church of Notre-Dame, dating from the twelfth century.
- The ruins of a thirteenth-century castle.
- The sixteenth-century chateau and its park.
- The medieval watermill at the hamlet of Berry.

== See also ==
- Communes of the Cher department
