= Baugy, Cher =

Baugy
- Commune
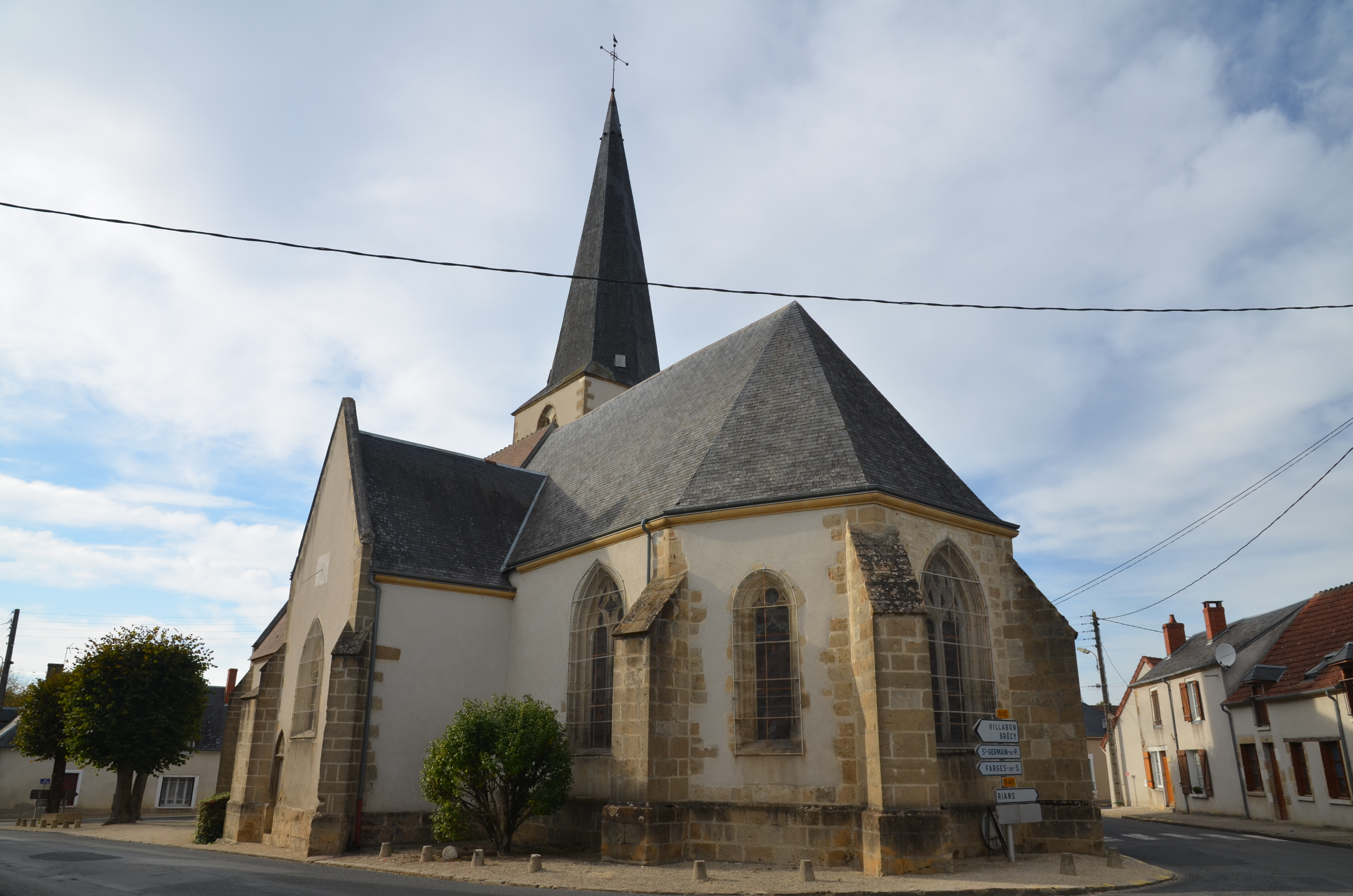
- The church in Baugy

- Coat of arms
- Location of Baugy
- Location within France Location within Centre-Val de Loire
- Coordinates: 47°04′56″N 2°43′42″E
- Country: France
- Region: Centre-Val de Loire
- Department: Cher
- Arrondissement: Bourges
- Canton: Avord
- Intercommunality: CC La Septaine

Government
  - Mayor (2020–2026): Pierre Grosjean
- Area^{1}: 47.78 km^{2} (18.45 sq mi)
- Highest elevation: 202 m (663 ft)
- Lowest elevation: 157 m (515 ft)
- Population (2023): 1,598
  - Density: 33.44/km^{2} (86.62/sq mi)
- Time zone: UTC+01:00 (CET)
  - Summer (DST): UTC+02:00 (CEST)
- INSEE/Postal code: 18023 /18800
- ^{1} French Land Register data, which excludes lakes, ponds, glaciers > 1 km^{2} (0.386 sq mi or 247 acres) and river estuaries.

Baugy (French pronunciation: [boʒi]) is a commune in the Cher department in the Centre-Val de Loire region of central France. On 1 January 2019, the former communes Laverdines and Saligny-le-Vif were merged into Baugy.

== Geography ==
A farming village with a little light industry situated in the upper valley of the river Yèvre, some 13 miles (21 km) east of Bourges at the junction of the D10, D12, D43 and the D71 roads.

== Population ==
Population data refer to the area corresponding with the commune as of January 2025.

Historical population
| Year | Pop. | ±% p.a. |
|---|---|---|
| 1968 | 1,461 | — |
| 1975 | 1,342 | −1.21% |
| 1982 | 1,353 | +0.12% |
| 1990 | 1,349 | −0.04% |
| 1999 | 1,346 | −0.02% |
| 2007 | 1,475 | +1.15% |
| 2012 | 1,718 | +3.10% |
| 2017 | 1,721 | +0.03% |
| 2023 | 1,598 | −1.23% |
Source: INSEE

== Sights ==
- The church of St.Martin, dating from the twelfth century.
- Vestiges of Roman occupation.
- Ruins of a ninth-century castle.
- A feudal motte at Montifaut.

== See also ==
- Communes of the Cher department
