= Canton of Avord =

Coordinates: 47.03°N 2.65°E

The canton of Avord is an administrative division of the Cher department, in central France. It was created at the French canton reorganisation which came into effect in March 2015. Its seat is in Avord.

It consists of the following communes:

1. Argenvières
2. Avord
3. Baugy
4. Beffes
5. Bengy-sur-Craon
6. La Chapelle-Montlinard
7. Charentonnay
8. Chassy
9. Chaumoux-Marcilly
10. Couy
11. Crosses
12. Étréchy
13. Farges-en-Septaine
14. Garigny
15. Groises
16. Gron
17. Herry
18. Jussy-Champagne
19. Jussy-le-Chaudrier
20. Lugny-Champagne
21. Marseilles-lès-Aubigny
22. Moulins-sur-Yèvre
23. Nohant-en-Goût
24. Osmoy
25. Précy
26. Saint-Léger-le-Petit
27. Saint-Martin-des-Champs
28. Sancergues
29. Savigny-en-Septaine
30. Sévry
31. Villabon
32. Villequiers
33. Vornay
