= Yèvre (Cher) =

River in central France

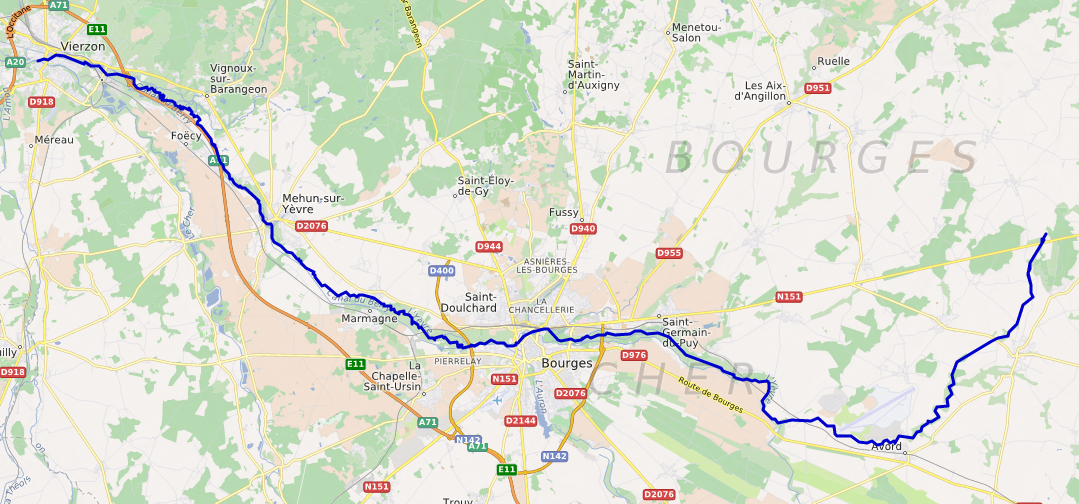

Location
- Country: France

Physical characteristics
- Mouth
  - location: Cher
  - coordinates: 47°13′9″N 2°3′35″E
- Length: 80.6 km (50.1 mi)

Basin features
- Progression: Cher→ Loire→ Atlantic Ocean

The Yèvre (French pronunciation: [jɛvʁ]) is a river in central France, a right tributary of the Cher. It is 80.6 km (50.1 mi) long. Its source is near the village of Gron, east of Bourges.

The Yèvre flows generally west through the following towns, all in the department of Cher: Baugy, Avord, Saint-Germain-du-Puy, Bourges, Mehun-sur-Yèvre, and Vierzon. The Yèvre flows into the Cher at Vierzon.

Its main tributaries are the Auron, the Airain, the Barangeon and the Colin. The Auron flows into the Yèvre in Bourges, the Airain in Savigny-en-Septaine. For part of its length, the Yèvre runs parallel to the disused Canal de Berry.
