= Sancerrois =

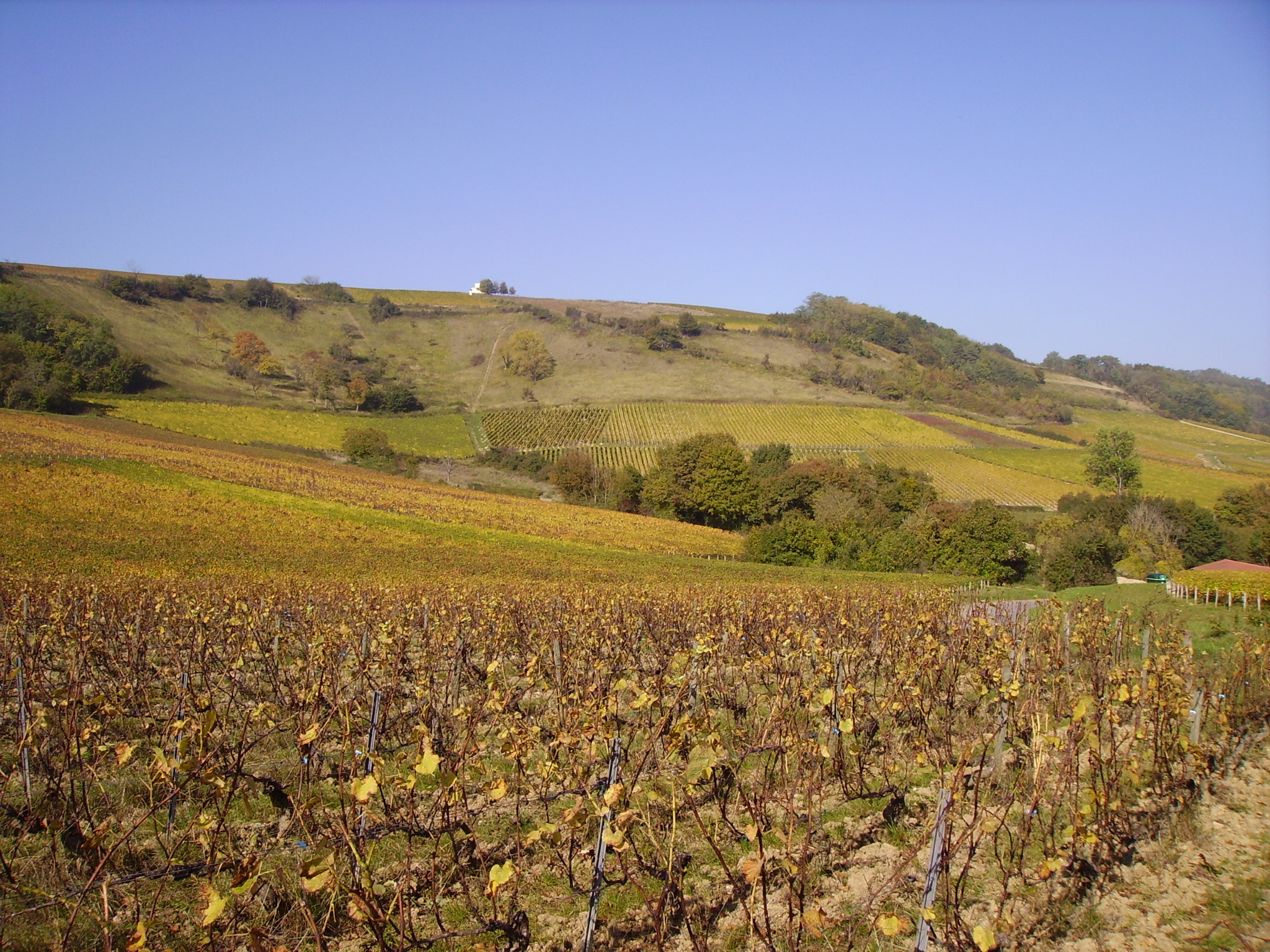
hillside at Bué

Sancerrois (French pronunciation: [sɑ̃sɛʁwa]) is a French natural region around Sancerre, Centre-Val de Loire.

The region is identified by its hills, vignoble, and the crottin de Chavignol.

== Geography ==
It is considered to lie between the Pays-Fort natural region and la Loire; it peaks at 431 m at the signal d'Humbligny on la Motte d'Humbigny.

== Patrimoine ==
- the château de Boucard at Le Noyer
