= Grande Sauldre =

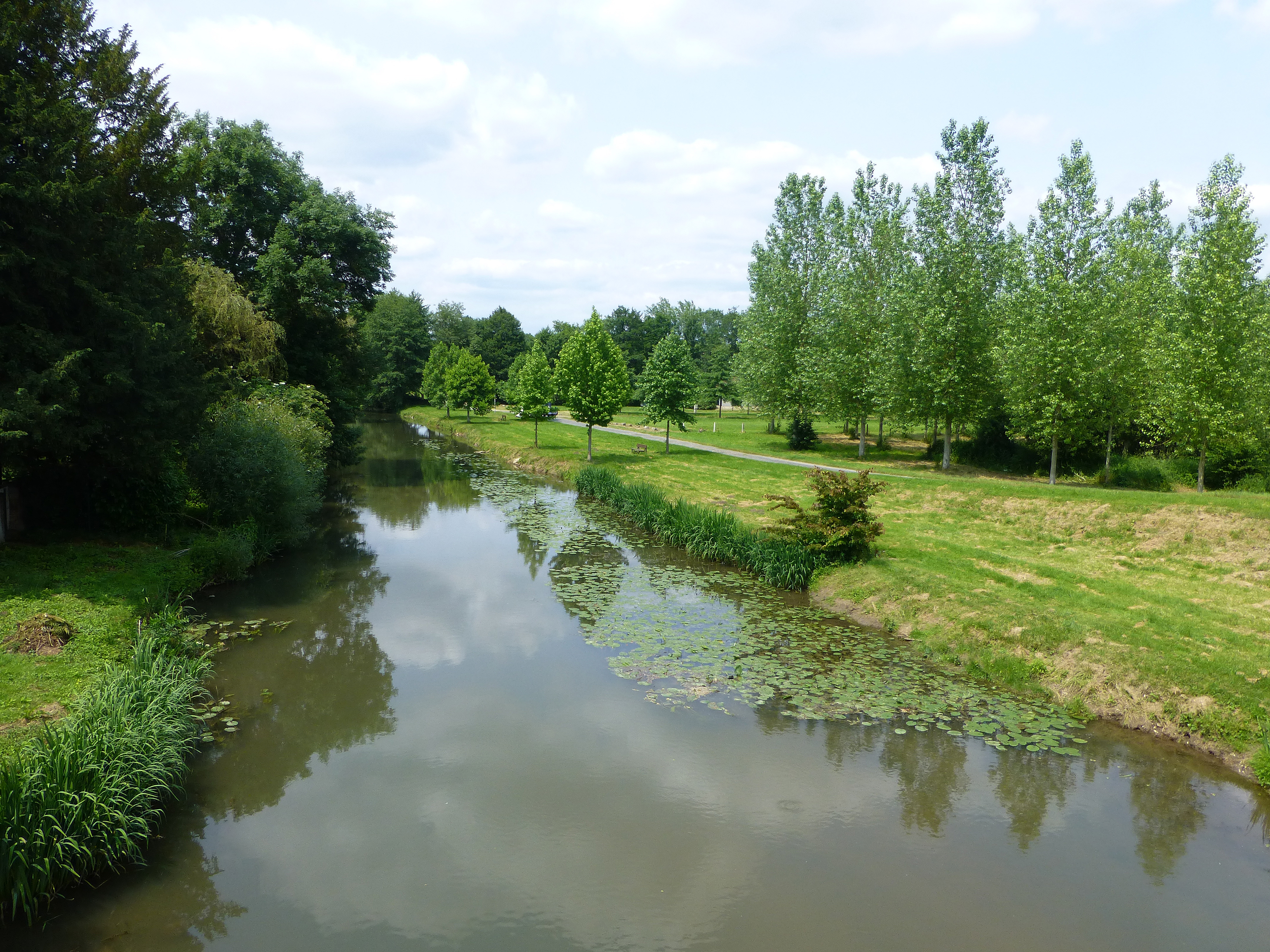
- View from a bridge near Argent-sur-Sauldre

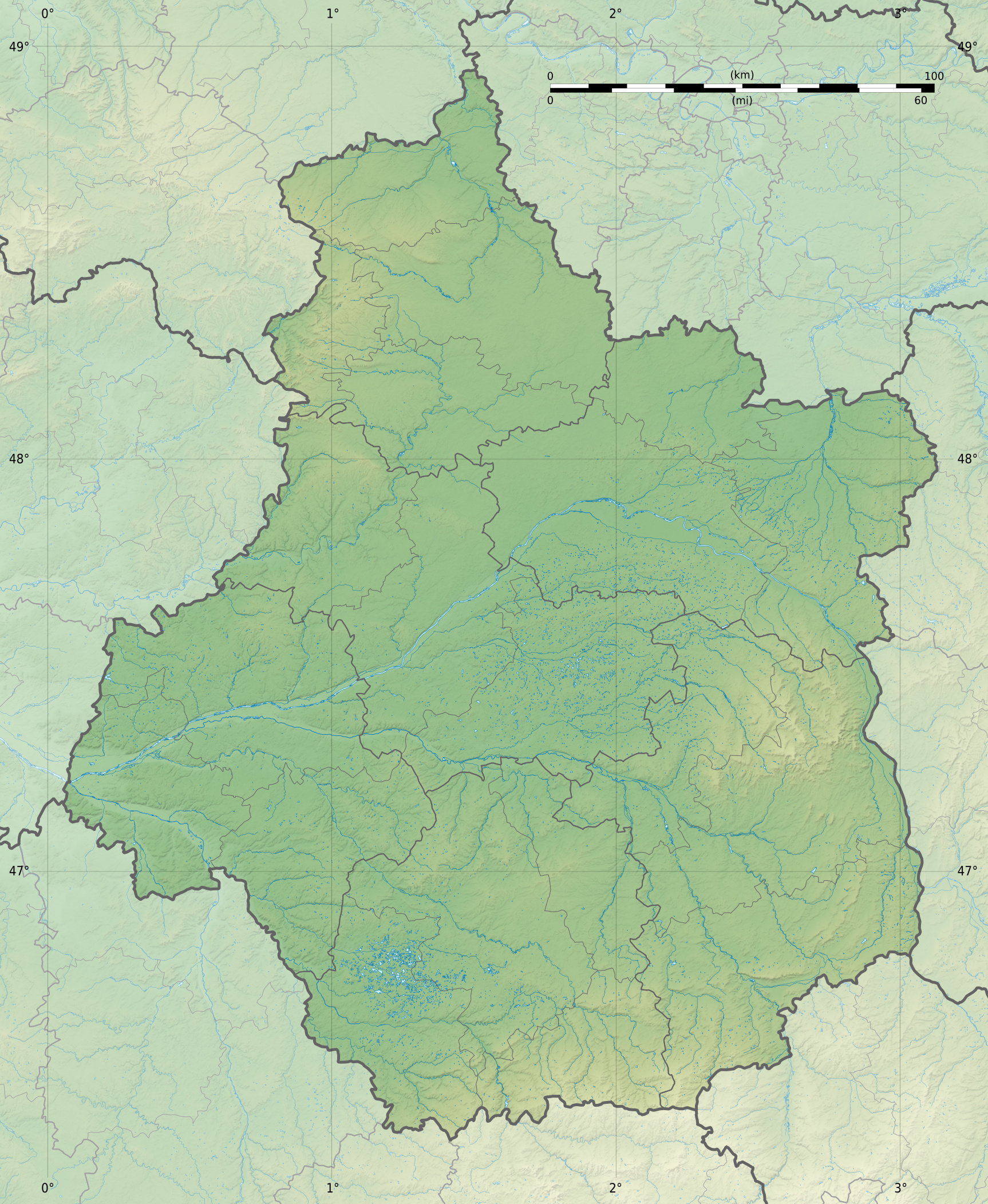
- Location within France Location within Centre-Val de Loire

Physical characteristics
- Source
  - location: East of Humbligny
  - coordinates: 47.257°N 2.684°E
  - elevation: 310 m (1,020 ft)
- Mouth
  - location: Sauldre, northeast of Salbris
  - coordinates: 47.451°N 2.0814°E
  - elevation: 109 m (358 ft)

Basin features
- Progression: Sauldre→ Cher→ Loire→ Atlantic Ocean
- Tributaries
  - left: Boute Vive, Oizenotte, Nère, Chanays, Ilonne
  - right: Salereine
- Source: SANDRE, Géoportail

The Grande Sauldre is an 85 km (53 mi) long river of central France. Its source is at Humbligny. It joins with the Petite Sauldre near Salbris to form the Sauldre. The Sandre considers it as the upper course of the Sauldre.

== Communes ==
Cher

- Humbligny, Neuilly-en-Sancerre, Sens-Beaujeu, Le Noyer, Thou, Vailly-sur-Sauldre, Barlieu, Concressault, Blancafort, Argent-sur-Sauldre, Clémont, Brinon-sur-Sauldre

Loir-et-Cher

- Pierrefitte-sur-Sauldre
