= Château de Boucard =

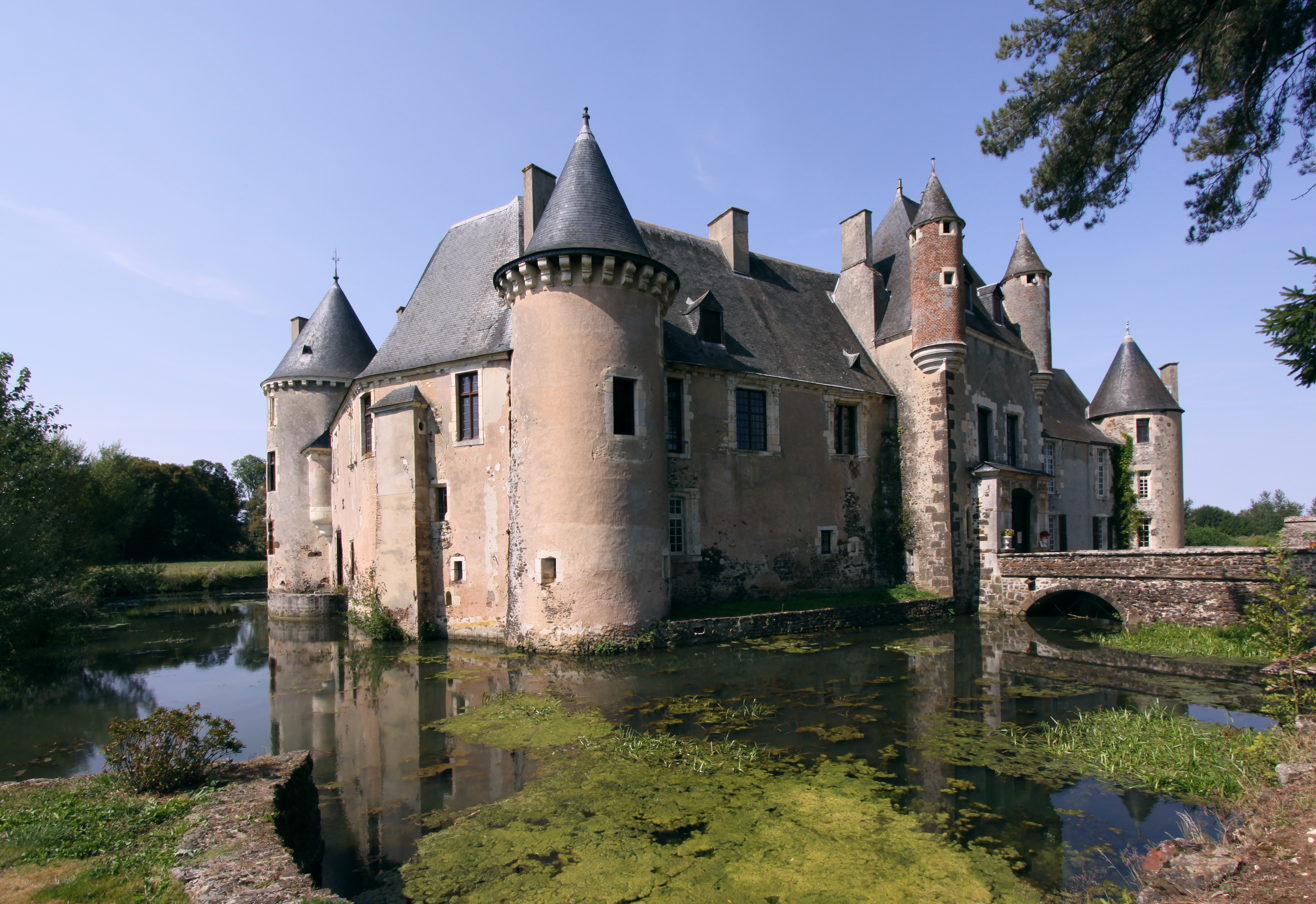
- Interactive map of the Château de Boucard area

General information
- Architectural style: Middle-Age, Renaissance
- Location: France
- Coordinates: 47.350503°N 2.681624°E
- Completed: XVIII^{e} siècle

The château de Boucard is located at Le Noyer (Cher), in the Pays-Fort natural region, France.

== History and architecture ==
The castle was built on the banks of la grande Sauldre in the Pays-Fort, near the Sancerrois in the ancient Boisbelle principality.

=== Middle-ages ===
Its name comes from the Boucard family (or Boucart) from Gascony, who became landowners in the Berry, after the wedding of Jean de Boucart with Anne de Blancafort at the end of the 14th century.

Shortly after their settlement, the castle was built on an ancient feudal mound (Motte du Plessis) by Lancelot de Boucart. The castle has kept its medieval styled châtelet entrance, outer walls and angled towers.

=== Renaissance ===
The château as we know it today is due for the most part to Antoine de Boucard, gentilhomme of the house of François I^{er}, soldier of the Italian wars, who built a new dwelling on the yard's southern angle, around 1520, in Renaissance style. One of his descendants, François de Boucard, rebuilt the wing in 1560. On the façade is written the castle's motto « Victrix patentia fatia » (patience, destiny's winner).

=== Modern times ===
From 1671 to 1674, Louis XIV assigned Philippe de Montaut-Bénac de Navailles to reside with Boucard, who opened the yard up on the Sauldre and arranged the first floor of the northern wing.

The gardening plan was assigned by Dosmont, pupil of the King's architect Jean-Michel Chevotet, to fermier général Étienne Perrinet de Jars who became owner of the castle in 1760.

The family still owned the castle, but gradually lost interest; the domain was progressively abandoned during the 19th century, to become only a site dedicated to hunting.

=== 20th century restoration ===
In the 1920s, Charles-Auguste de Bryas, descendant of the Vogüé family inherited the castle. His wife, Hélène de Bryas (born La Rochefoucauld) rediscovered the castle and the gardens threatening to fall into ruins, restored them to render the domain habitable. The family sojourned namely during World War II.

In the 1960s, the château was acquired by its present owner, Marie-Henriette de Montabert, daughter of Hélène de Brias, who opened it to the public and made it a stage of la Route Jacques-Cœur in 1965.

The castle and its dependencies, the parks and gardens, moats, canals and bridges allowed a ranking title of Monument historique on July 10, 1995.

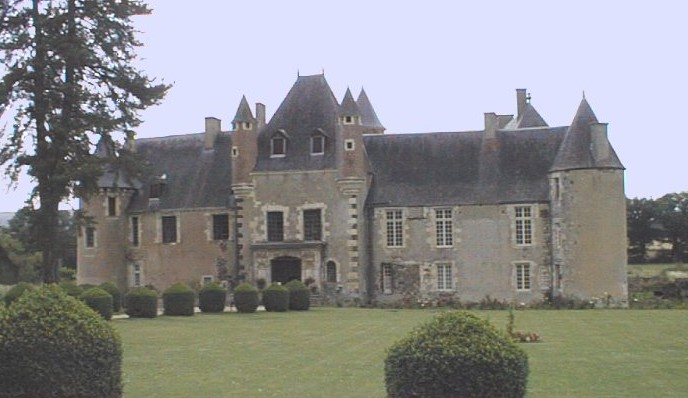
northern side
view from le parc

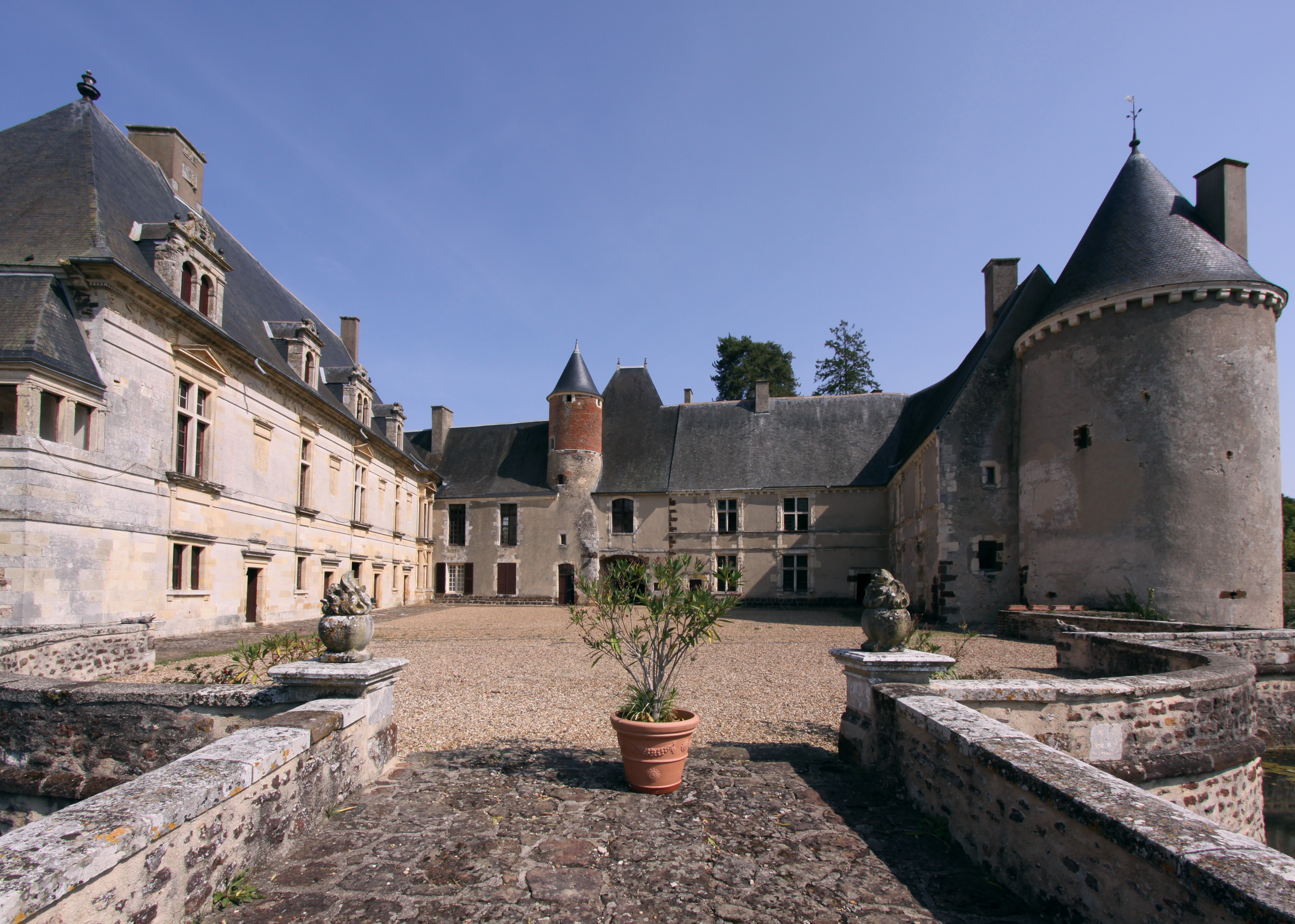
yard

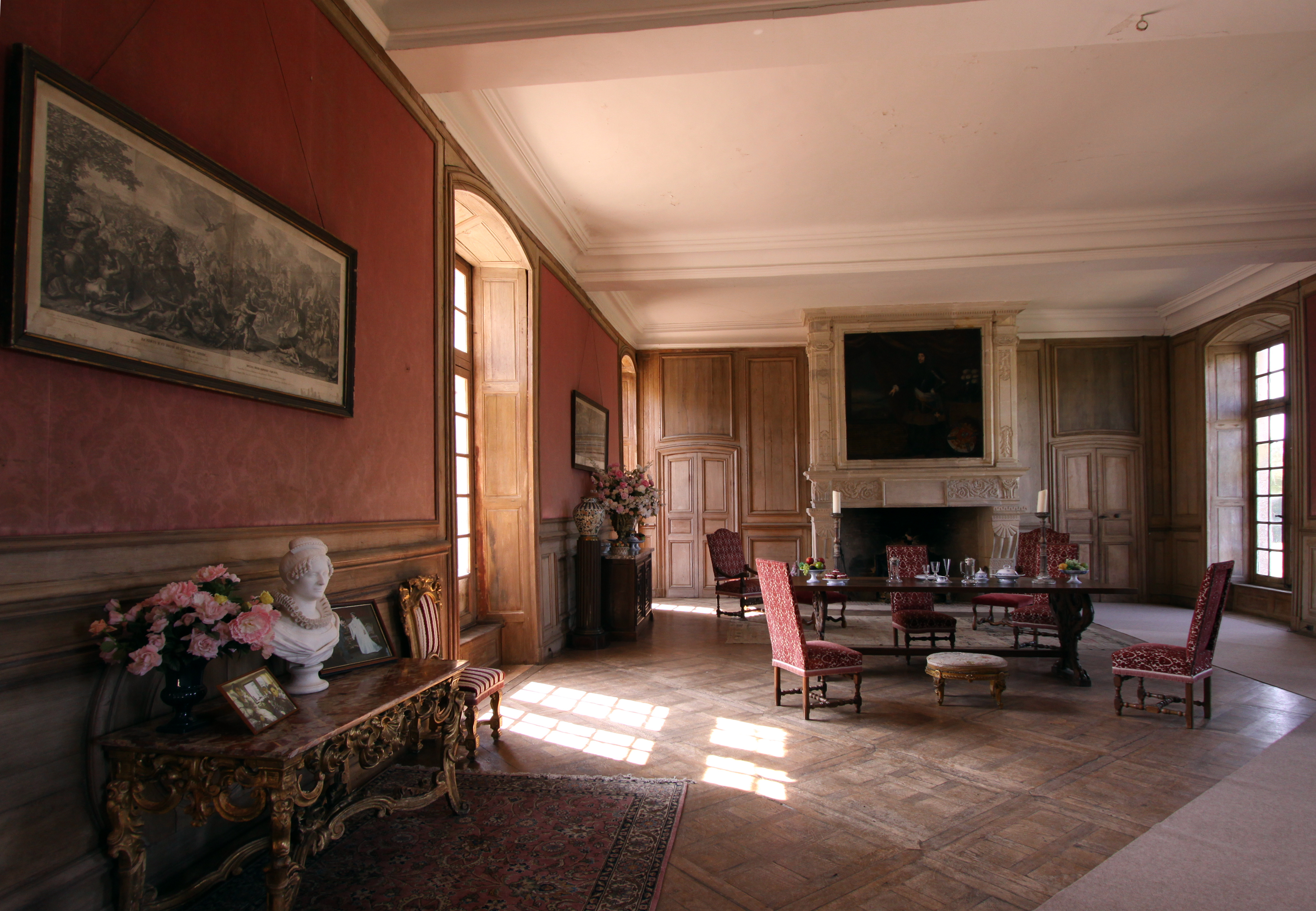
right wing room
