= Museum of Sologne =

French museum

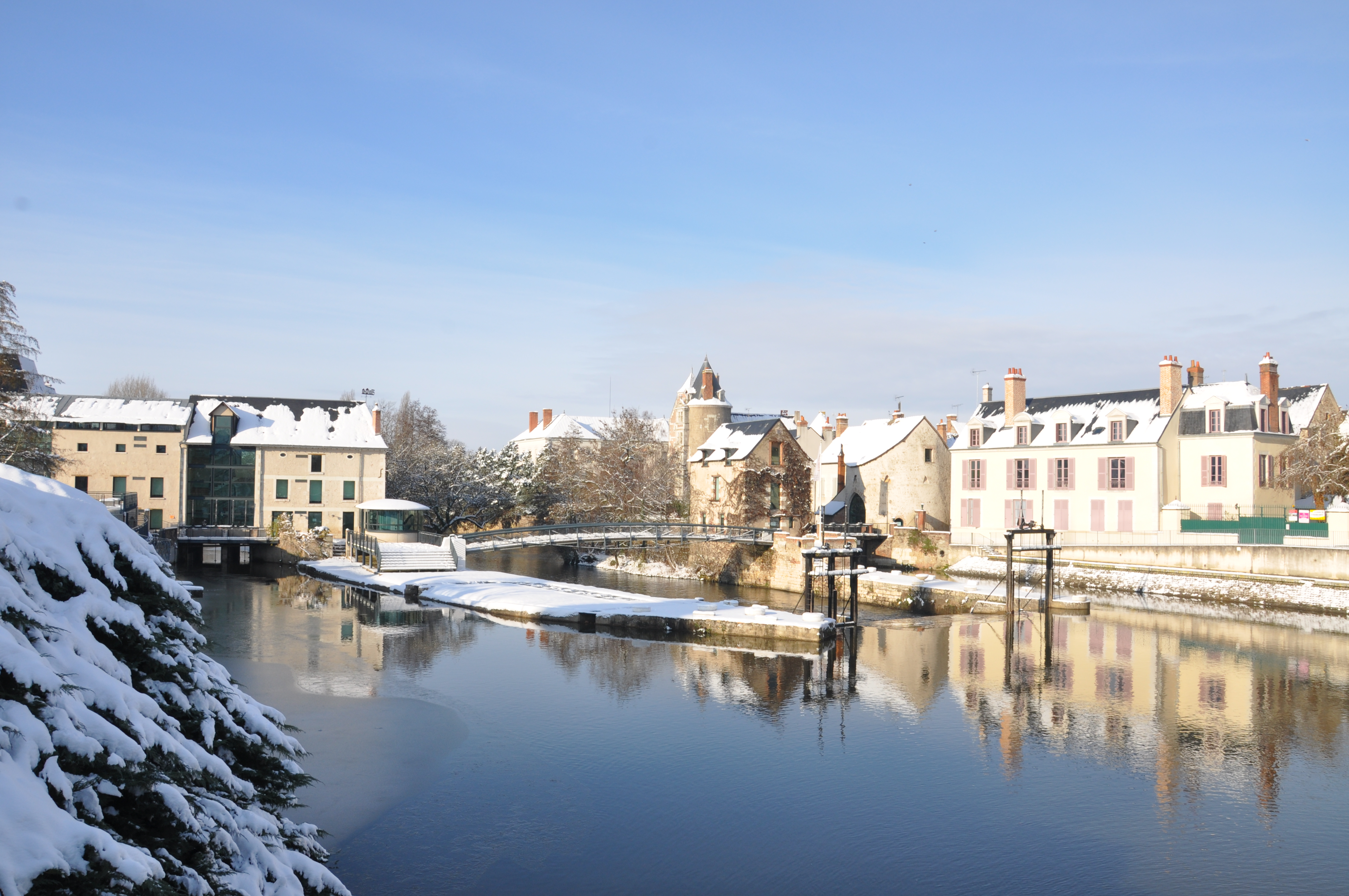
- The museum (at left)
- Established: 1950
- Location: Romorantin-Lanthenay (France)
- Coordinates: 47.3572°N 1.7432°E
- Website: Museum website

The Museum of Sologne is a museum dedicated to the history and culture of the Sologne region, located in Romorantin-Lanthenay, France, comprising the Chapter Mill, Town Mill and Jacquemart Tower.

== History ==
The museum was first made by the two mills. These mills were separated by a reach and there were three wheels that turned. The buildings went through many constructional changes. The flour mill was still operating up until the 1970s.

The town mill section of the museum once belonged to the royal household up until 1540. Francis I exchanged this land that was meant for the Parc de Chambord. The town mill was then acquired by the city of Romorantin-Lanthenay in 1971.

The Jacquemart Tower section of the museum is the oldest building in Romorantin. it was built and created during the 12th and 13th centuries.

It became an official Museum of France on February 1, 2003.

== Facilities ==
Originally formed from two separate mills, the Chapter Mill operated until the 1970s and is now the heart of the museum.

Exhibits in the Chapter Mill tell the story of the manufacturing of textiles (sheets) and the economy of the city. On the upper floor, there is also an exhibition dedicated to Leonardo da Vinci's projects.

The Jacquemart Tower is the site of the museum's temporary exhibitions.

== Collections ==
The museum of Sologne also houses a documentation center. The main part of the center consists of a library where the collection of Émile-Martin is kept. This collection includes many old works about botany.

=== Codex Arundel ===
In 2011, Carlo Pedretti, an Italian historian and honorary citizen of the town of Romorantin-Lanthenay, donated a facsimile of the Codex Arundel to the museum. This codex was authored by Leonardo da Vinci and the donation was made in order to establish a documentary background on the famous Italian author. It brings together many drawings by the artist-researcher, and most notably his project of a palace on the banks of the Sauldre river.

=== Hunting ===
Soignee, home to nearly 500 castles, is well known for its hunting. Part of the museum's exhibition is dedicated to hunting and poaching.

== Gallery ==
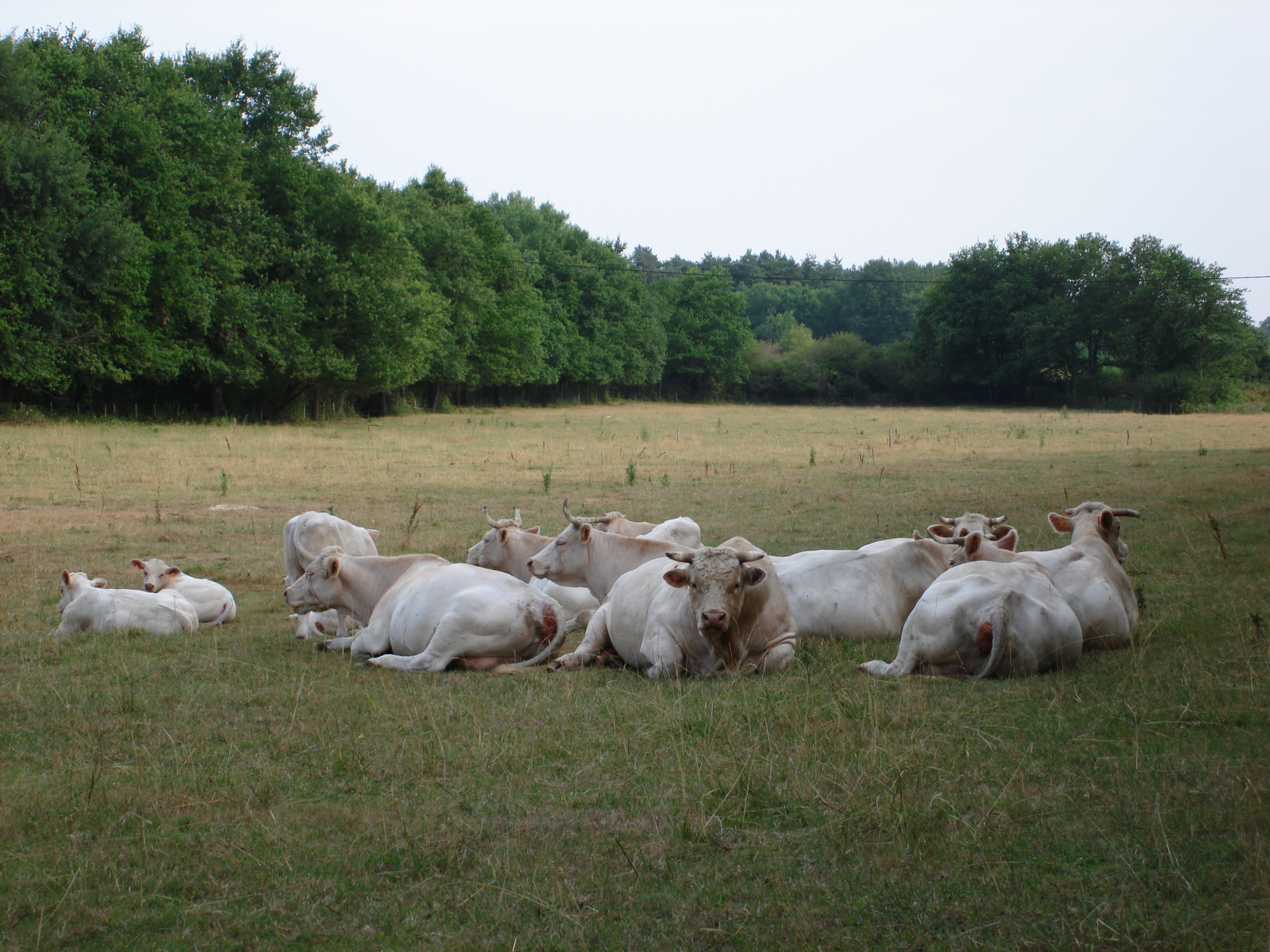
Sologne cows

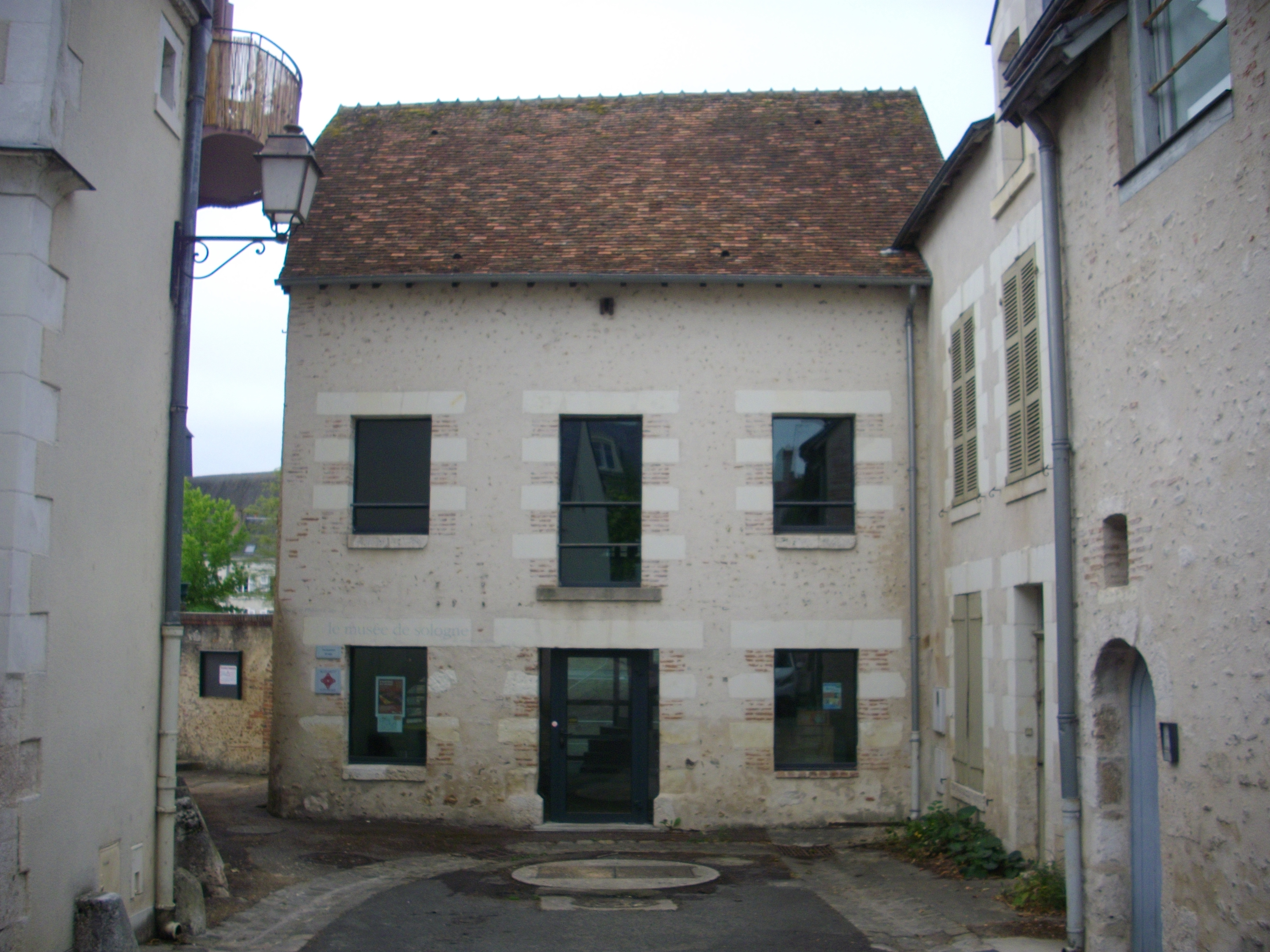
Jacquemeard tower

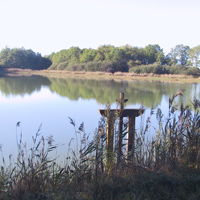
Sologne pond

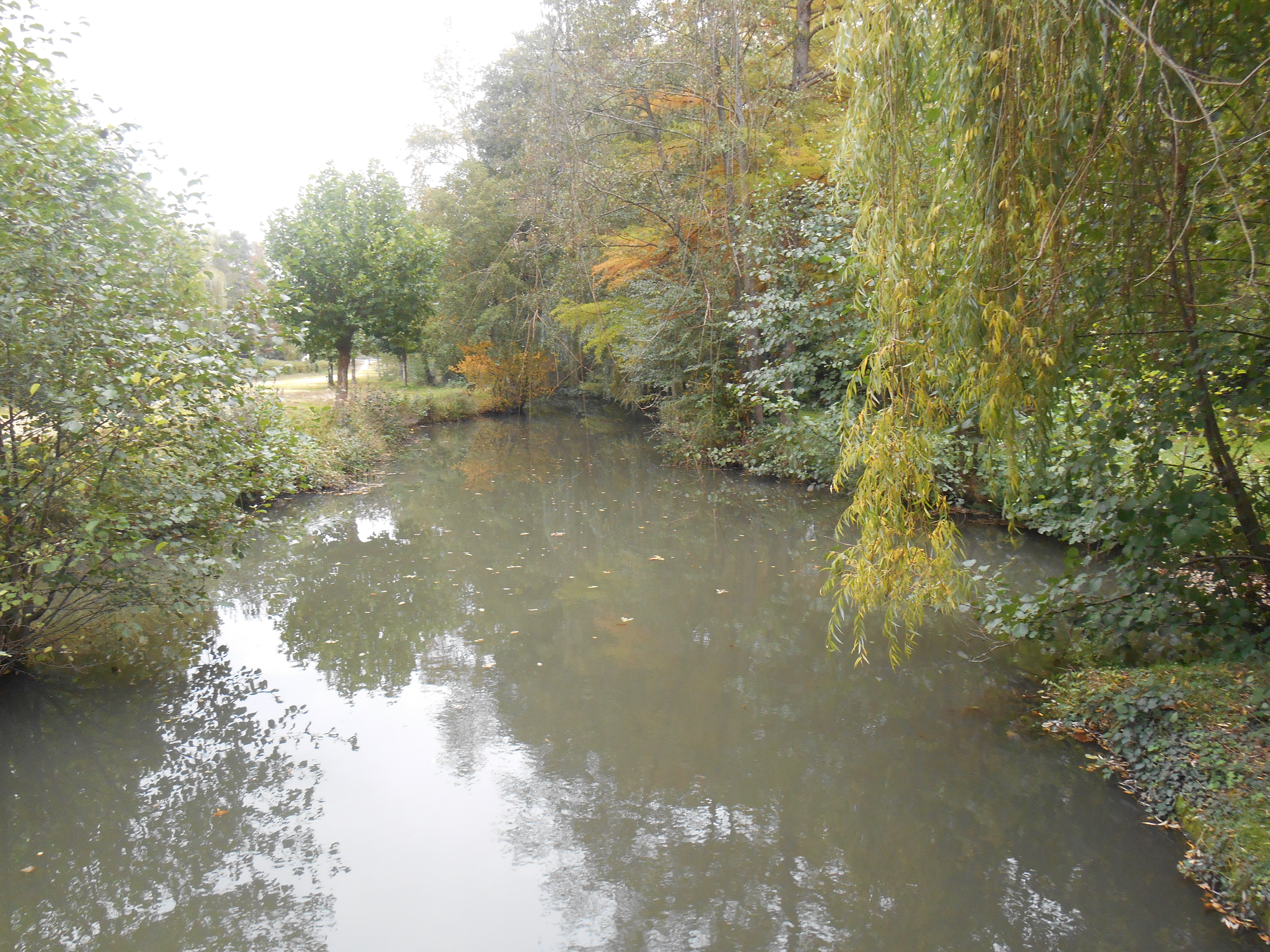
Bourillon river at Marcilly-en-Villette

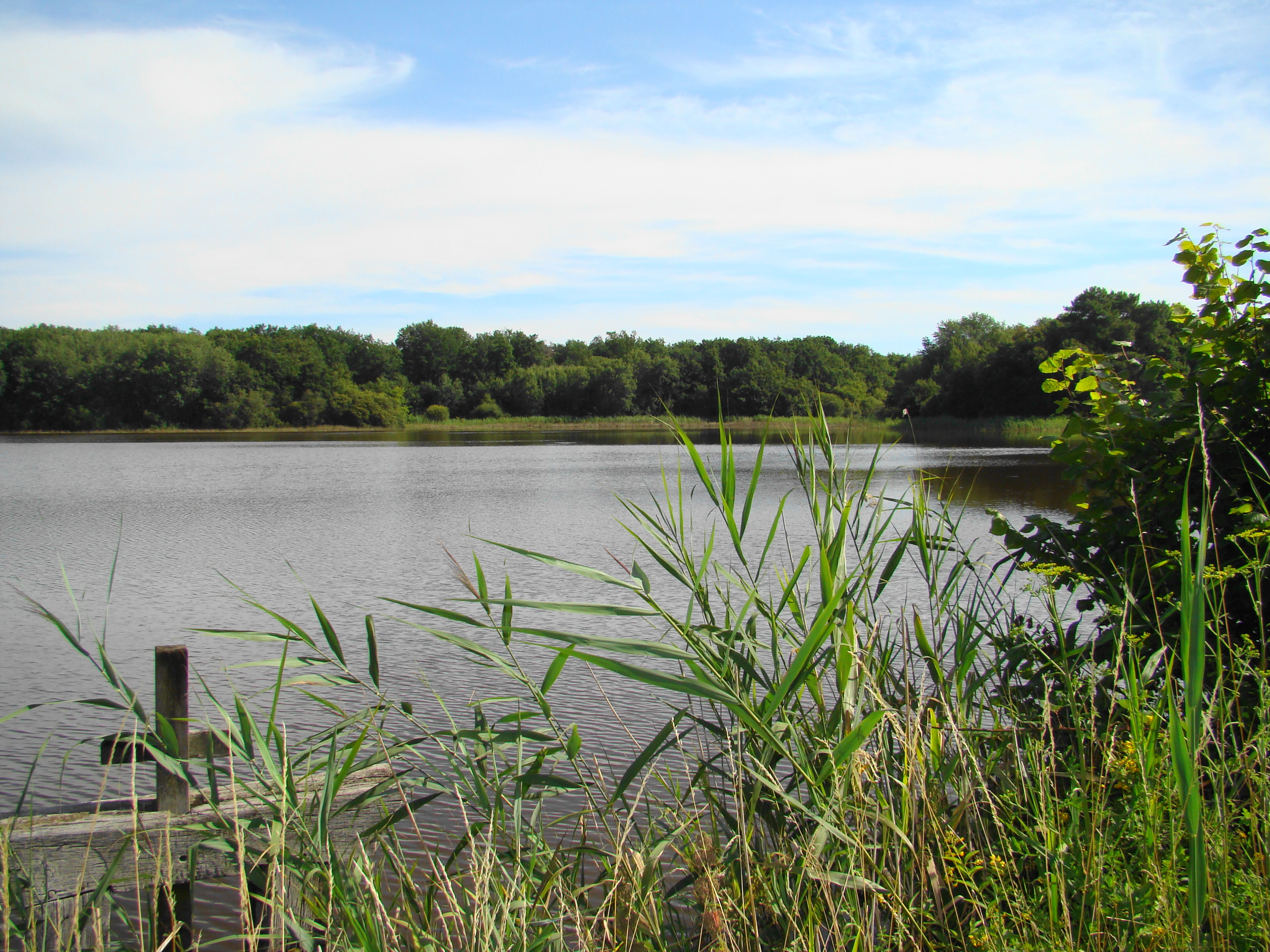
Paysage de Sologne

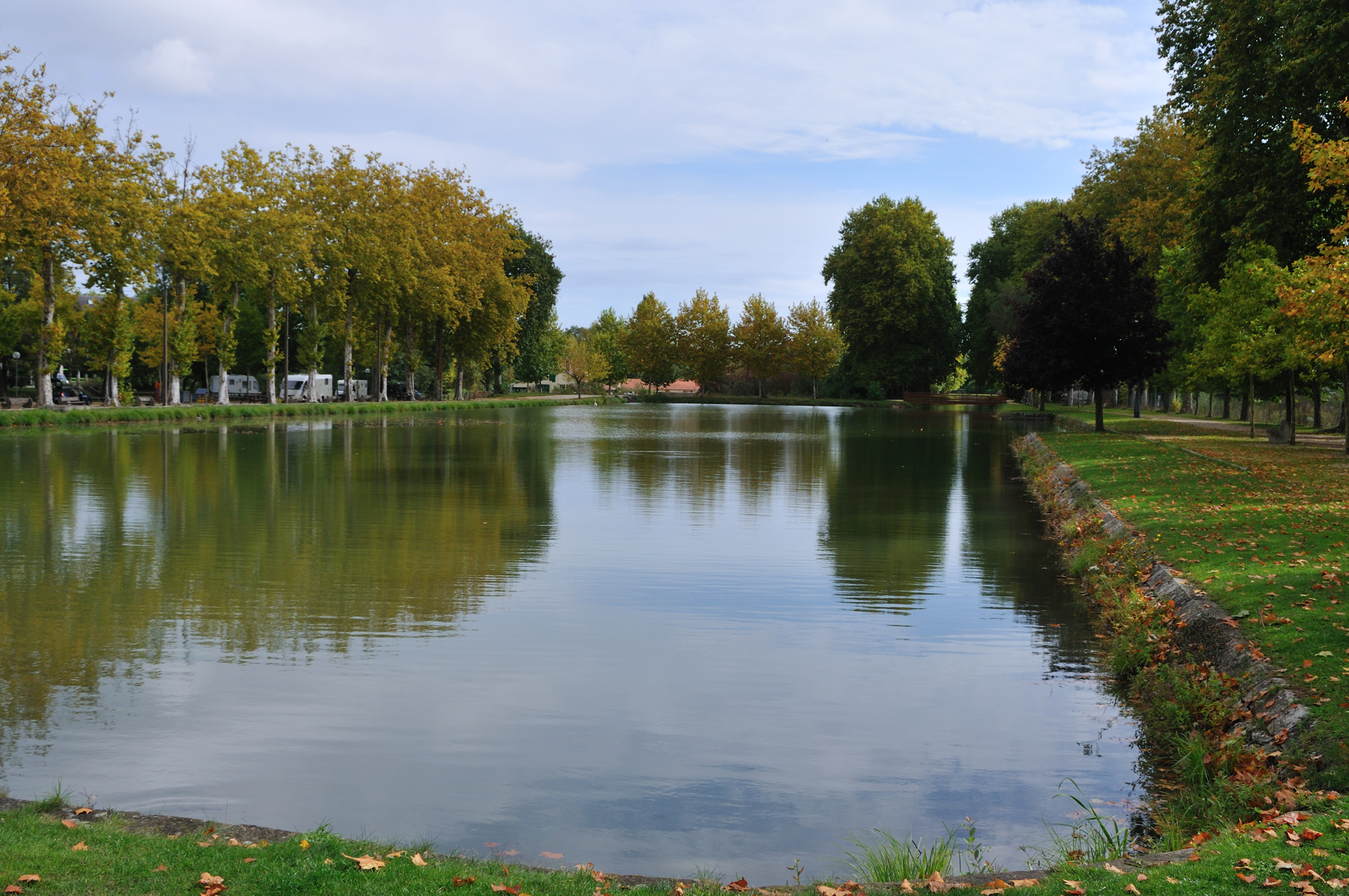
Canal de la Sauldre at Lamotte-Beuvron

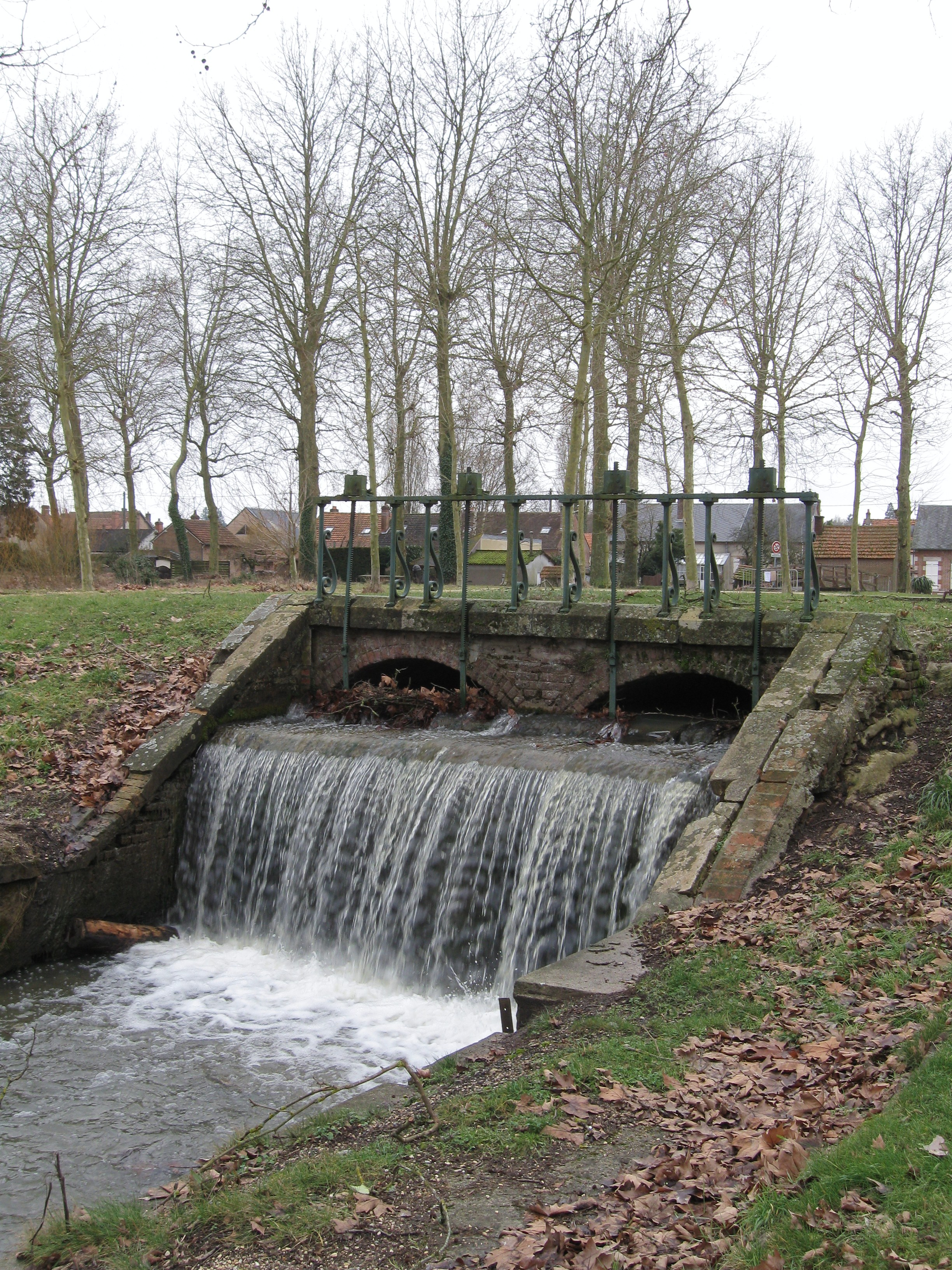
Canal de la Sauldre at Lamotte-Beuvron

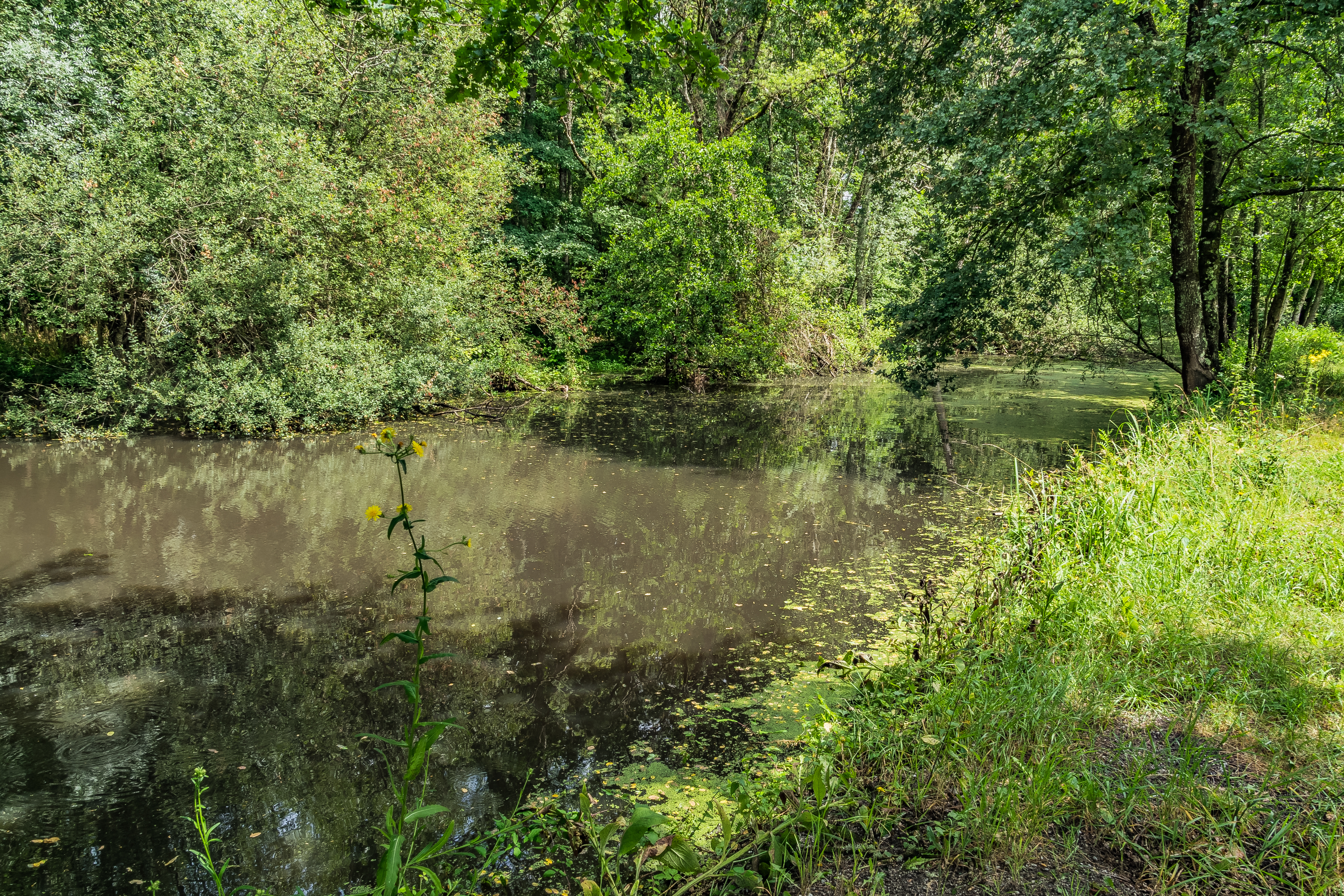
The Beuvron at Bracieux

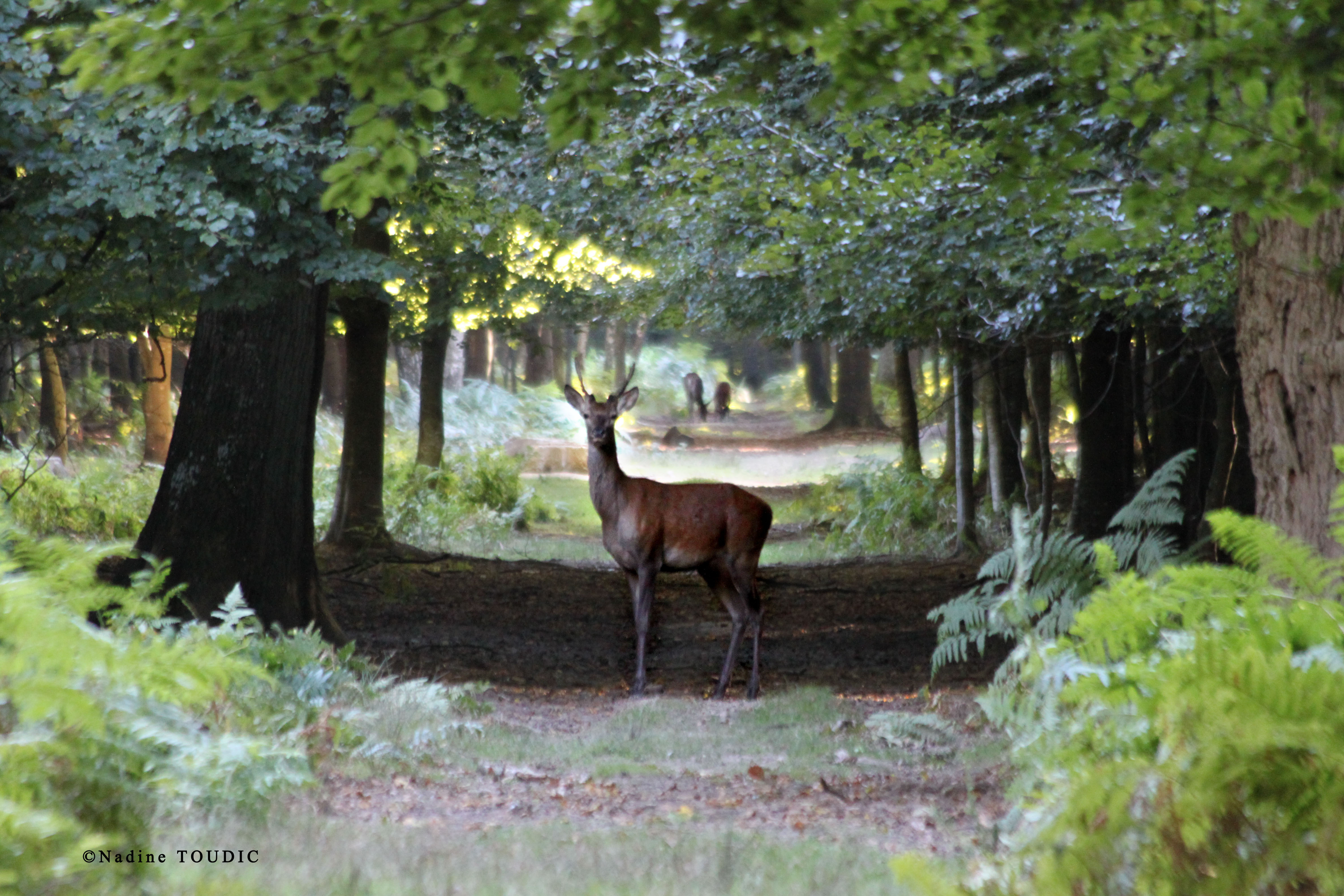
A daguet
