= Sens-Beaujeu =

- Commune
- Location of Sens-Beaujeu
- Location within France Location within Centre-Val de Loire
- Coordinates: 47°19′39″N 2°42′32″E
- Country: France
- Region: Centre-Val de Loire
- Department: Cher
- Arrondissement: Bourges
- Canton: Sancerre
- Intercommunality: CC Pays Fort Sancerrois Val de Loire

Government
  - Mayor (2020–2026): Laurent Fauroux
- Area^{1}: 21.54 km^{2} (8.32 sq mi)
- Elevation: 300 m (980 ft)
- Highest elevation: 392 m (1,286 ft)
- Lowest elevation: 223 m (732 ft)
- Population (2023): 403
  - Density: 18.7/km^{2} (48.5/sq mi)
- Time zone: UTC+01:00 (CET)
  - Summer (DST): UTC+02:00 (CEST)
- INSEE/Postal code: 18249 /18300
- ^{1} French Land Register data, which excludes lakes, ponds, glaciers > 1 km^{2} (0.386 sq mi or 247 acres) and river estuaries.

Sens-Beaujeu is a commune in the Cher department in the Centre-Val de Loire region of France.

== Geography ==
An area of farming comprising the village and a couple of hamlets situated in the Sauldre river valley about 21 miles (34 km) northeast of Bourges, at the junction of the D7 with the D74 and the D196 roads.

== Population ==
Historical population
Year	Pop.	±% p.a.
1968	511	—
1975	444	−1.99%
1982	430	−0.46%
1990	398	−0.96%
1999	377	−0.60%
2007	427	+1.57%
2012	423	−0.19%
2017	399	−1.16%
2023	403	+0.17%
Source: INSEE

== Sights ==
- The church of St. Caprais, dating from the thirteenth century.
- Two feudal mottes.
- The sixteenth-century chateau of Beaujeu, now a hotel.
- Two watermills.

== See also ==
- Communes of the Cher department
