= Petite Sauldre =

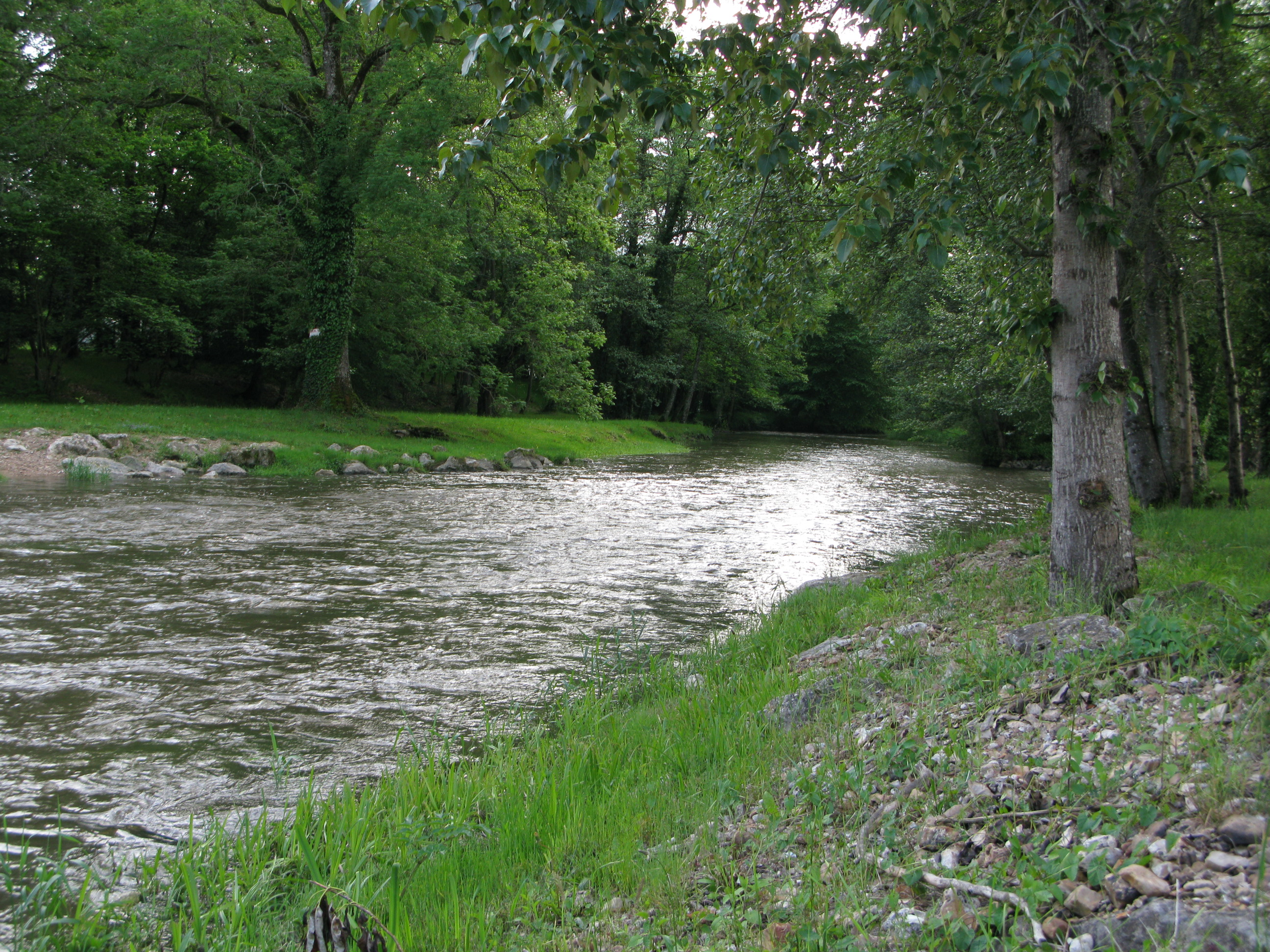
- At Ménétréol-sur-Sauldre

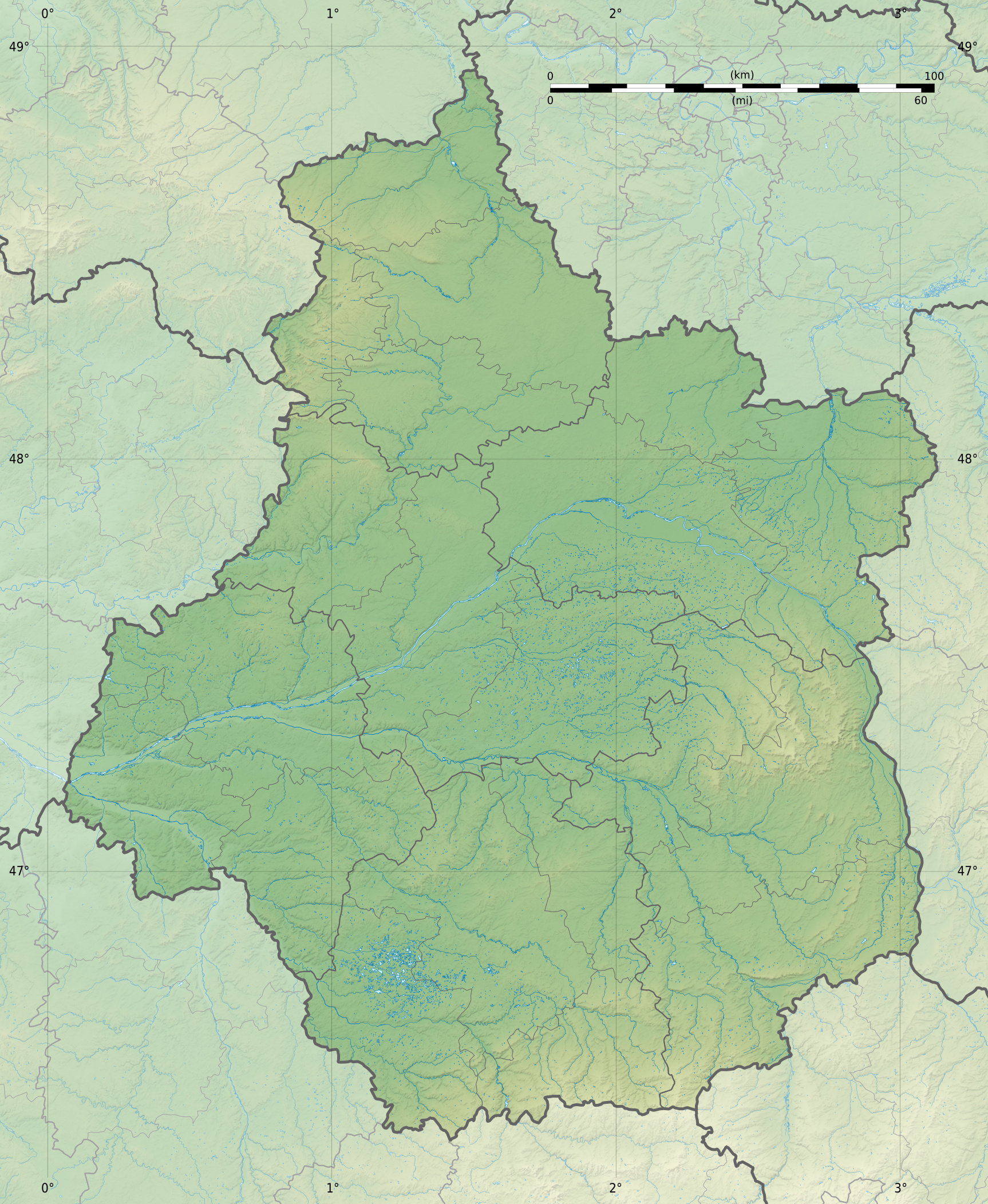
- Location within France Location within Centre-Val de Loire

Physical characteristics
- Source
  - location: near Parassy
  - coordinates: 47.236°N 2.550°E
  - elevation: 310 m (1,020 ft)
- Mouth
  - location: Sauldre, northeast of Salbris
  - coordinates: 47.451°N 2.0814°E
  - elevation: 109 m (358 ft)

Basin features
- Progression: Sauldre→ Cher→ Loire→ Atlantic Ocean
- Tributaries
  - right: Vernon
- Source: Sandre, Géoportail

The Petite Sauldre is a 63.3-kilometre (39.3 mi) long river of France. Near Salbris, it joins with the Grande Sauldre, to form the Sauldre.

== Communes ==
The river passes through the following communes.

Cher

- Parassy, Henrichemont, Menetou-Salon, Achères, Ivoy-le-Pré, La Chapelle-d'Angillon, Ennordres, Ménétréol-sur-Sauldre

Loir-et-Cher

- Souesmes, Salbris
