= Romorantin-Lanthenay =

- Commune
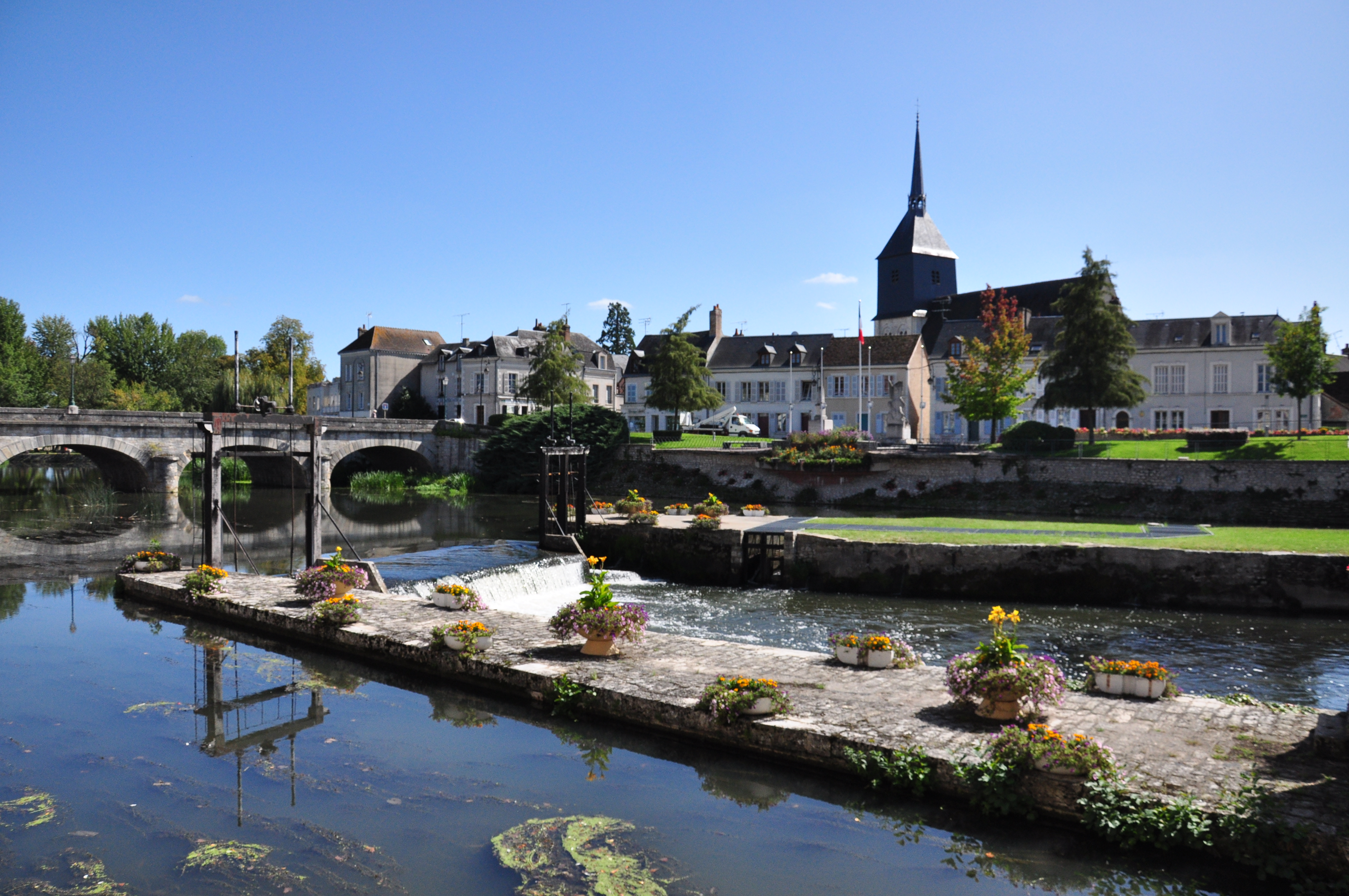
- Centre of town and the Sauldre

- Coat of arms
- Location of Romorantin-Lanthenay
- Location within France Location within Centre-Val de Loire
- Coordinates: 47°21′32″N 1°44′37″E
- Country: France
- Region: Centre-Val de Loire
- Department: Loir-et-Cher
- Arrondissement: Romorantin-Lanthenay
- Canton: Romorantin-Lanthenay

Government
  - Mayor (2020–2026): Jeanny Lorgeoux
- Area^{1}: 45.31 km^{2} (17.49 sq mi)
- Elevation: 88 m (289 ft)
- Highest elevation: 121 m (397 ft)
- Lowest elevation: 84 m (276 ft)
- Population (2023): 18,373
  - Density: 405.5/km^{2} (1,050/sq mi)
- Time zone: UTC+01:00 (CET)
  - Summer (DST): UTC+02:00 (CEST)
- INSEE/Postal code: 41194 /41200
- ^{1} French Land Register data, which excludes lakes, ponds, glaciers > 1 km^{2} (0.386 sq mi or 247 acres) and river estuaries.

Romorantin-Lanthenay (French pronunciation: [ʁɔmɔʁɑ̃tɛ̃ lɑ̃tənɛ]), commonly known as Romorantin, is a commune and town in the Loir-et-Cher department, administrative region of Centre-Val de Loire, France.

It is the capital city of the natural region of Sologne.

== History ==
In 1516 Louise of Savoy, mother of King Francis I, commissioned Leonardo da Vinci to plan at Romorantin a new palace and model town, fit to be a new capital for France. This plan also called for the cutting of a canal between the Loire and the Sauldre. Work was begun, but apparently came to a halt in 1519 on the death of Leonardo.

The current commune is the result of the merger, on 29 May 1961, of the former communes of Romorantin and Lanthenay.

== Transportation ==
Romorantin is served by the A85 autoroute and the TER Centre-Val de Loire regional rail network (Chemin de Fer du Blanc-Argent).

== Population ==
The population data given in the table and graph below for 1954 and earlier refer to the former commune of Romorantin.

Historical population

Year	Pop.	±% p.a.
1793	5,872	—
1800	6,105	+0.56%
1806	6,320	+0.58%
1821	6,970	+0.65%
1831	6,985	+0.02%
1836	7,181	+0.56%
1841	7,259	+0.22%
1846	7,400	+0.39%
1851	7,962	+1.47%
1856	7,919	−0.11%
1861	7,642	−0.71%
1866	7,867	+0.58%
1872	7,602	−0.57%
1876	7,826	+0.73%
1881	8,010	+0.47%
1886	7,545	−1.19%
1891	7,812	+0.70%
1896	7,972	+0.41%
1901	8,130	+0.39%

Year	Pop.	±% p.a.
1906	8,374	+0.59%
1911	8,102	−0.66%
1921	7,754	−0.44%
1926	8,001	+0.63%
1931	7,550	−1.15%
1936	7,734	+0.48%
1946	7,900	+0.21%
1954	8,040	+0.22%
1962	11,777	+4.89%
1968	14,096	+3.04%
1975	16,719	+2.47%
1982	17,692	+0.81%
1990	17,865	+0.12%
1999	18,350	+0.30%
2007	17,559	−0.55%
2012	16,746	−0.94%
2017	17,754	+1.18%
2023	18,373	+0.57%

Source: EHESS and INSEE (1968–2023)

== Personalities ==
- Martha Broissier was made famous around the year of 1598 for her feigned demonic possession.
- Nassira El Moaddem, journalist, TV presenter and writer.
- Davy Jeanney, rallycross driver.

== Sites and tourism ==
The city hosts the Museum of Sologne. Sologne is a region in North-Central France, well known for its forest.

== Sport ==
Between 6 July and 22 July 2007 Sologne Aerodrome was used for the Women's World Gliding Championships.

Romorantin was home to former French automobile firm Matra.

Every year during the last weekend in October, a gastronomy festival is held in Romorantin. First held in 1978, "Les Journées Gastronomiques de Sologne" now attracts around 13,000 visitors.

Davy Jeanney, a two-time winner in the World Rallycross Championship, lives in Romorantin-Lanthenay.

== Twin towns – sister cities ==
Romorantin-Lanthenay is twinned with:

- Aranda de Duero, Spain
- Langen, Germany
- Long Eaton, England, United Kingdom
- Mudanya, Turkey

== Climate ==
Climate data for Romarantin-Lanthenay (1991–2020 normals, extremes 1921–present)
Month	Jan	Feb	Mar	Apr	May	Jun	Jul	Aug	Sep	Oct	Nov	Dec	Year
Record high °C (°F)	17.9 (64.2)	23.7 (74.7)	28.8 (83.8)	29.3 (84.7)	32.5 (90.5)	40.0 (104.0)	42.0 (107.6)	41.2 (106.2)	36.6 (97.9)	32.1 (89.8)	23.8 (74.8)	20.2 (68.4)	42.0 (107.6)
Mean daily maximum °C (°F)	8.1 (46.6)	9.5 (49.1)	13.8 (56.8)	17.0 (62.6)	20.6 (69.1)	24.1 (75.4)	26.4 (79.5)	26.6 (79.9)	22.5 (72.5)	17.5 (63.5)	11.7 (53.1)	8.4 (47.1)	17.2 (63.0)
Daily mean °C (°F)	4.6 (40.3)	5.0 (41.0)	8.0 (46.4)	10.4 (50.7)	14.2 (57.6)	17.6 (63.7)	19.5 (67.1)	19.3 (66.7)	15.6 (60.1)	12.2 (54.0)	7.6 (45.7)	4.9 (40.8)	11.6 (52.9)
Mean daily minimum °C (°F)	1.1 (34.0)	0.4 (32.7)	2.2 (36.0)	3.9 (39.0)	7.8 (46.0)	11.1 (52.0)	12.6 (54.7)	12.1 (53.8)	8.7 (47.7)	7.0 (44.6)	3.5 (38.3)	1.4 (34.5)	6.0 (42.8)
Record low °C (°F)	−20.9 (−5.6)	−20.0 (−4.0)	−14.7 (5.5)	−7.1 (19.2)	−4.2 (24.4)	−0.8 (30.6)	2.4 (36.3)	1.2 (34.2)	−2.5 (27.5)	−8.8 (16.2)	−12.0 (10.4)	−18.4 (−1.1)	−20.9 (−5.6)
Average precipitation mm (inches)	55.6 (2.19)	47.1 (1.85)	47.1 (1.85)	57.4 (2.26)	68.5 (2.70)	53.5 (2.11)	55.9 (2.20)	54.4 (2.14)	55.4 (2.18)	70.2 (2.76)	64.2 (2.53)	66.4 (2.61)	695.7 (27.39)
Average precipitation days (≥ 1.0 mm)	10.7	9.7	9.1	9.7	9.2	8.0	7.5	7.3	8.1	10.5	11.0	11.3	112.1
Mean monthly sunshine hours	60.7	85.1	144.8	176.7	196.8	211.1	228.6	225.7	181.5	119.5	67.1	54.7	1,752.1
Source: Meteociel

== See also ==
- Sologne
- Sauldre River
- SO Romorantin, association football team
- Stade Jules Ladoumègue, a stadium in Romorantin-Lanthenay
