= Le Noyer, Cher =

Le Noyer
- Commune
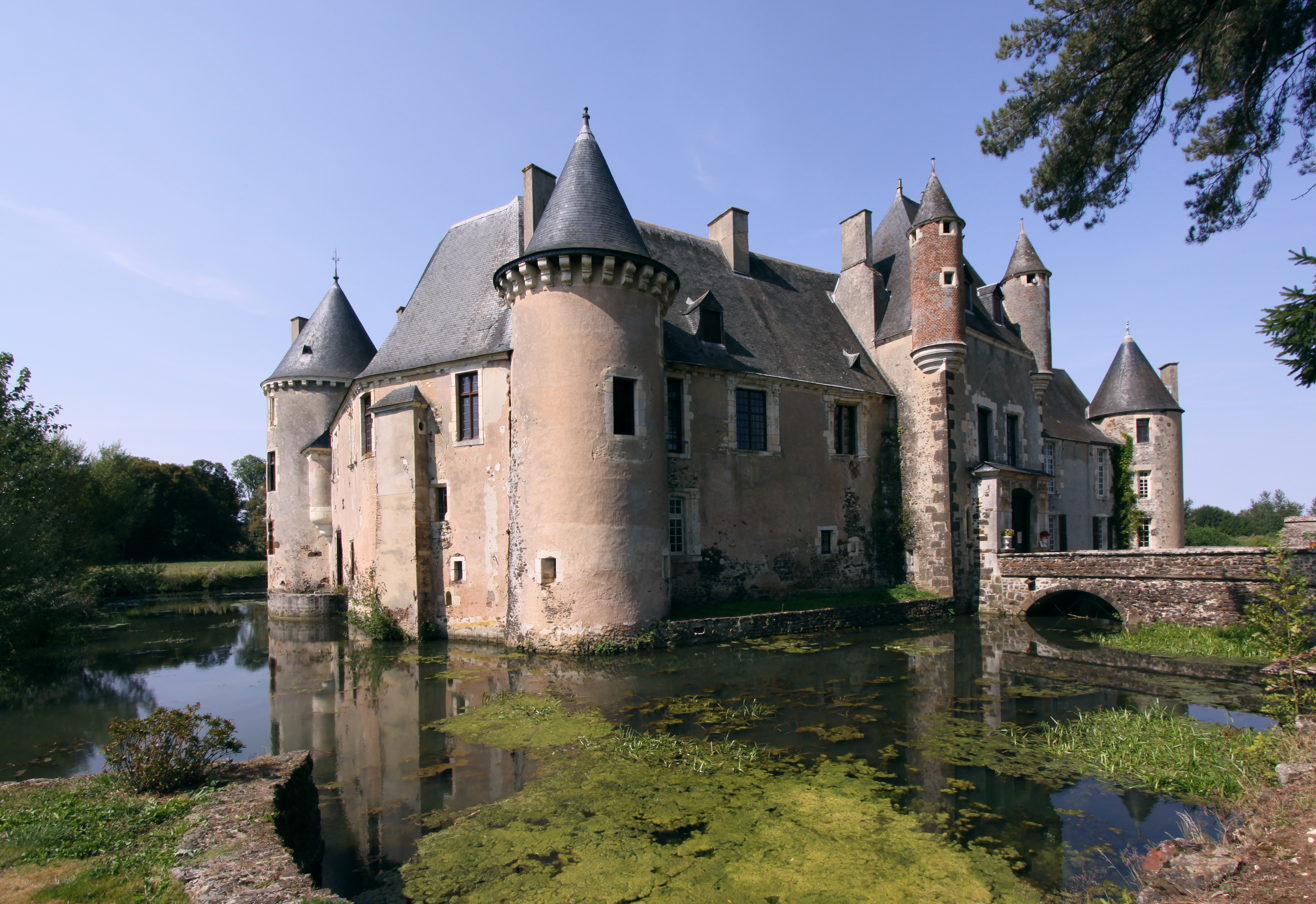
- Château de Boucard
- Location of Le Noyer
- Location within France Location within Centre-Val de Loire
- Coordinates: 47°23′06″N 2°40′54″E
- Country: France
- Region: Centre-Val de Loire
- Department: Cher
- Arrondissement: Bourges
- Canton: Sancerre
- Intercommunality: CC Pays Fort Sancerrois Val de Loire

Government
  - Mayor (2020–2026): Chantal Millerioux
- Area^{1}: 19.98 km^{2} (7.71 sq mi)
- Elevation: 260 m (850 ft)
- Highest elevation: 374 m (1,227 ft)
- Lowest elevation: 208 m (682 ft)
- Population (2023): 246
  - Density: 12.3/km^{2} (31.9/sq mi)
- Time zone: UTC+01:00 (CET)
  - Summer (DST): UTC+02:00 (CEST)
- INSEE/Postal code: 18168 /18260
- ^{1} French Land Register data, which excludes lakes, ponds, glaciers > 1 km^{2} (0.386 sq mi or 247 acres) and river estuaries.

Le Noyer is a commune in the Cher department in the Centre-Val de Loire region of France.

== Geography ==
An area of forestry and farming comprising the village and a couple of hamlets situated in the valley of the Sauldre river, some 27 miles (43 km) northeast of Bourges, at the junction of the D55, D85, D94 and the D74 roads.

== Population ==
Historical population

| Year | Pop. | ±% p.a. |
|---|---|---|
| 1800 | 665 | — |
| 1861 | 1,003 | +0.68% |
| 1866 | 1,001 | −0.04% |
| 1911 | 828 | −0.42% |
| 1962 | 491 | −1.02% |
| 1968 | 398 | −3.44% |
| 1975 | 350 | −1.82% |

| Year | Pop. | ±% p.a. |
|---|---|---|
| 1982 | 296 | −2.37% |
| 1990 | 265 | −1.37% |
| 1999 | 266 | +0.04% |
| 2007 | 272 | +0.28% |
| 2012 | 235 | −2.88% |
| 2017 | 219 | −1.40% |
| 2023 | 246 | +1.96% |

Source: EHESS, INSEE

== Sights ==
- A seventeenth-century farm and mill.
- The church of Notre-Dame, dating from the twelfth century.
- The château of Boucard, rebuilt in the sixteenth century over the feudal castle.

== See also ==
- Communes of the Cher department
