= Sauldre =

River in central France

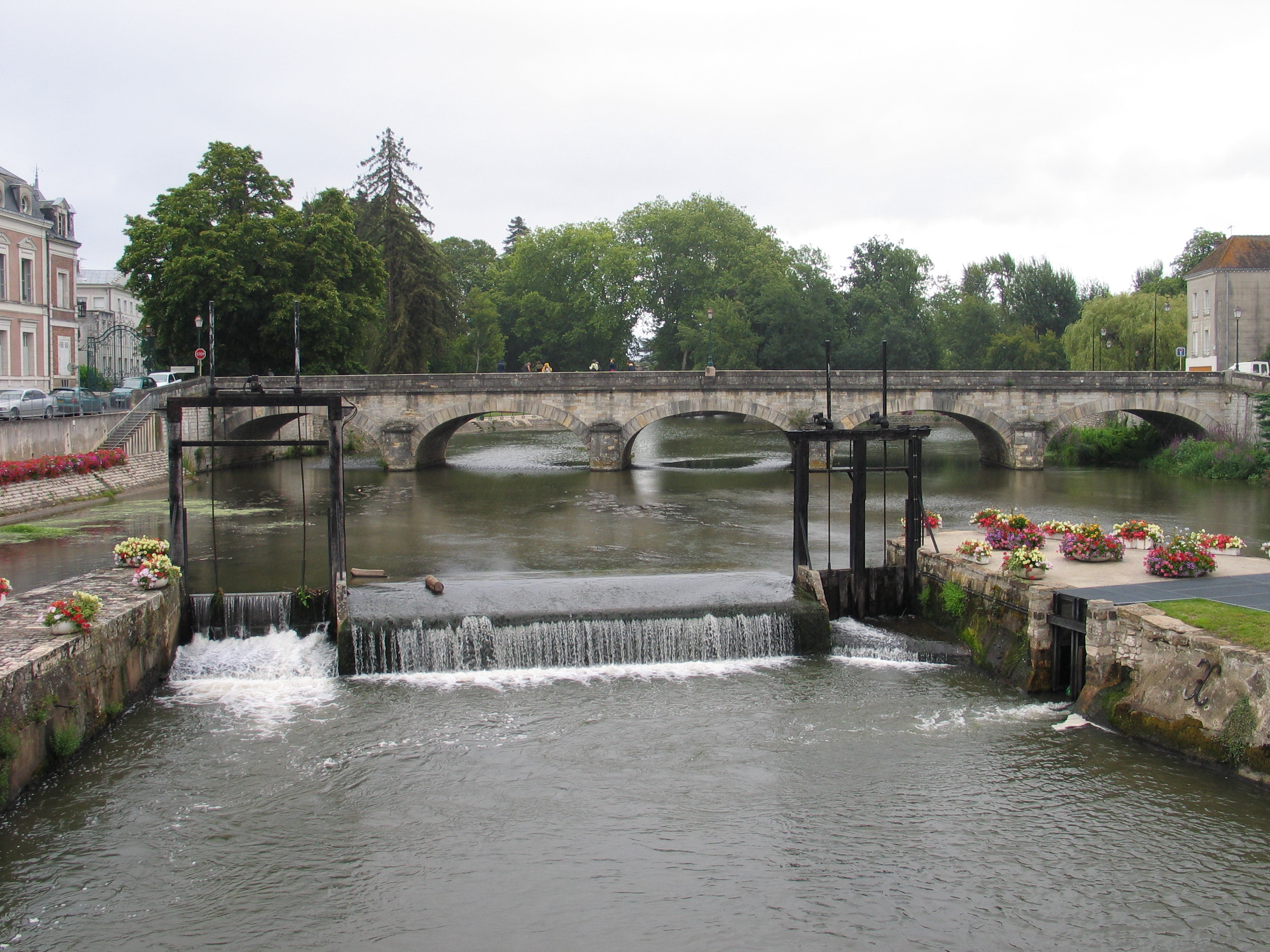
- The Sauldre at Romorantin

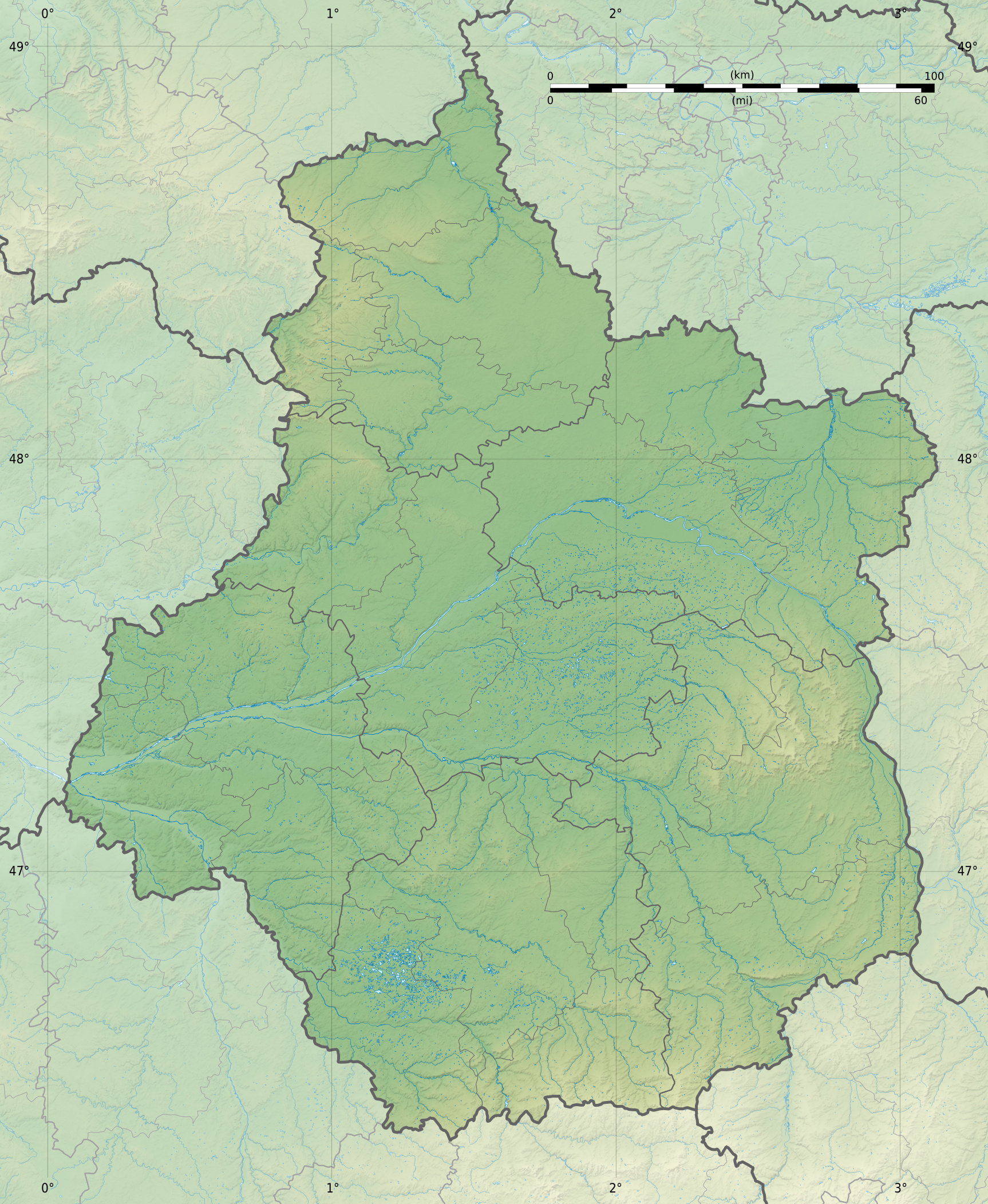
- Location within France Location within Centre-Val de Loire

Location
- Country: France

Physical characteristics
- Mouth
  - location: Cher
  - coordinates: 47°16′23″N 1°30′43″E
- Length: 183.1 km (113.8 mi)
- Basin size: 2,200 km^{2} (850 mi^{2})

Basin features
- Progression: Cher→ Loire→ Atlantic Ocean
- Tributaries
  - left: Rère, Petite Sauldre
  - right: Grande Sauldre

The Sauldre (French pronunciation: [so(l)dʁ]) is a 183.1 km (113.8 mi) long river in central France, a right tributary of the Cher. Its source is near the village of Montigny, southwest of Sancerre. The Sauldre flows generally northwest, through the following departments and towns:

- Cher: Vailly-sur-Sauldre, Argent-sur-Sauldre
- Loir-et-Cher: Salbris, Romorantin-Lanthenay

The Sauldre flows into the Cher near Selles-sur-Cher.

The Rère, Grande Sauldre and Petite Sauldre are among its tributaries.
