= Canton of Sancergues =

Coordinates: 47°9′22″N 2°55′3″E

Sancergues
- Former canton
- Interactive map of Sancergues
- Country: France
- Region: Centre-Val de Loire
- Department: Cher
- No. of communes: {{{nbcomm}}}
- Disbanded: 2015
- Area: 352.84 km^{2} (136.23 sq mi)
- Population (2012): 7,530
  - Density: 21.3/km^{2} (55.3/sq mi)

The Canton of Sancergues is a former canton situated in the Cher département in the Centre Region region of France. It was disbanded following the French canton reorganisation which came into effect in March 2015. It consisted of 18 communes, which joined the new canton of Avord in 2015. It had 7,530 inhabitants (2012).

== Geography ==
It was in the valley of the river Loire, in the eastern part of the arrondissement of Bourges. The altitude varies from 147m at Herry to 269m at Chaumoux-Marcilly, with an average altitude of 182m.

The canton comprised 18 communes:

- Argenvières
- Beffes
- La Chapelle-Montlinard
- Charentonnay
- Chaumoux-Marcilly
- Couy
- Étréchy
- Garigny
- Groises
- Herry
- Jussy-le-Chaudrier
- Lugny-Champagne
- Marseilles-lès-Aubigny
- Précy
- Saint-Léger-le-Petit
- Saint-Martin-des-Champs
- Sancergues
- Sévry

== Population ==
Historical population Canton of Sancergues
| Year | 1962 | 1968 | 1975 | 1982 | 1990 | 1999 |
| Pop. | 8,143 | 8,834 | 8,172 | 7,702 | 7,492 | 7,340 |
| ±% | — | +8.5% | −7.5% | −5.8% | −2.7% | −2.0% |
From the year 1962 on: No double counting – residents of multiple communes (e.g. students and military personnel) are counted only once. Source: INSEE

== See also ==
- Arrondissements of the Cher department
- Cantons of the Cher department
- Communes of the Cher department
