= Ménétréol =

Ménétréol may refer to two communes in the Cher department, central France:

- Ménétréol-sous-Sancerre
- Ménétréol-sur-Sauldre
