= Saint-Bouize =

- Commune
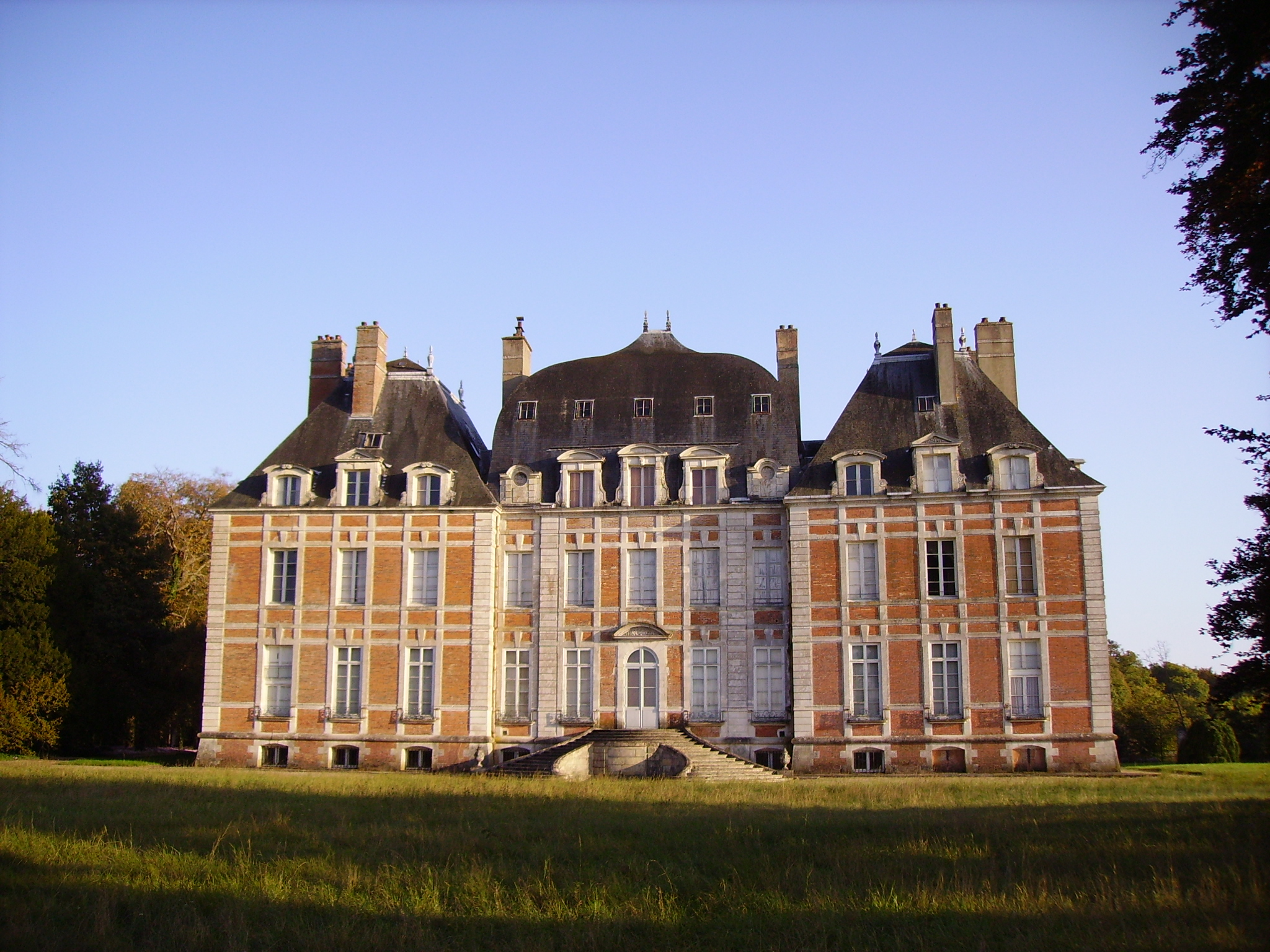
- The Château of Montalivet-Lagrange
- Location of Saint-Bouize
- Location within France Location within Centre-Val de Loire
- Coordinates: 47°17′08″N 2°53′09″E
- Country: France
- Region: Centre-Val de Loire
- Department: Cher
- Arrondissement: Bourges
- Canton: Sancerre
- Intercommunality: CC Pays Fort Sancerrois Val de Loire

Government
  - Mayor (2020–2026): Anne-Marie Terrefond
- Area^{1}: 14.97 km^{2} (5.78 sq mi)
- Elevation: 203 m (666 ft)
- Highest elevation: 248 m (814 ft)
- Lowest elevation: 148 m (486 ft)
- Population (2023): 253
  - Density: 16.9/km^{2} (43.8/sq mi)
- Time zone: UTC+01:00 (CET)
  - Summer (DST): UTC+02:00 (CEST)
- INSEE/Postal code: 18200 /18300
- ^{1} French Land Register data, which excludes lakes, ponds, glaciers > 1 km^{2} (0.386 sq mi or 247 acres) and river estuaries.

Saint-Bouize (French pronunciation: [sɛ̃ bwiz]) is a commune in the Cher department in central France.

== Population ==
Historical population
Year	Pop.	±% p.a.
1968	336	—
1975	348	+0.50%
1982	348	+0.00%
1990	313	−1.32%
1999	295	−0.66%
2007	321	+1.06%
2012	335	+0.86%
2017	312	−1.41%
2023	253	−3.43%
Source: INSEE

== Sights ==
- Chateau Lagrange-Montalivet, 1590.
- Church St. Baudel (twelfth century for its oldest parts): Built in four stages, ... The base is a Romanesque church Berry "pure", consisting of two rectangles built in the twelfth century. In the fourteenth century, a tower is erected by the Count of Sancerre, at the request of parishioners. At the heart of religious wars, the tower is suffering: it was twice as high in the beginning. In the eighteenth century a sacristy was built in 1836 and a chapel. In 1850, the priest asks its demolition for a more modern building, which will be rejected [2].
- Bridge-channel mold which allows the lateral canal to cross the Loire River Moule, 1893.

== Geography ==
The river Vauvise flows north through the middle of the commune. The Château de Montalivet-Lagrange is here.

== See also ==
- Communes of the Cher department
