= Vauvise =

River in central France

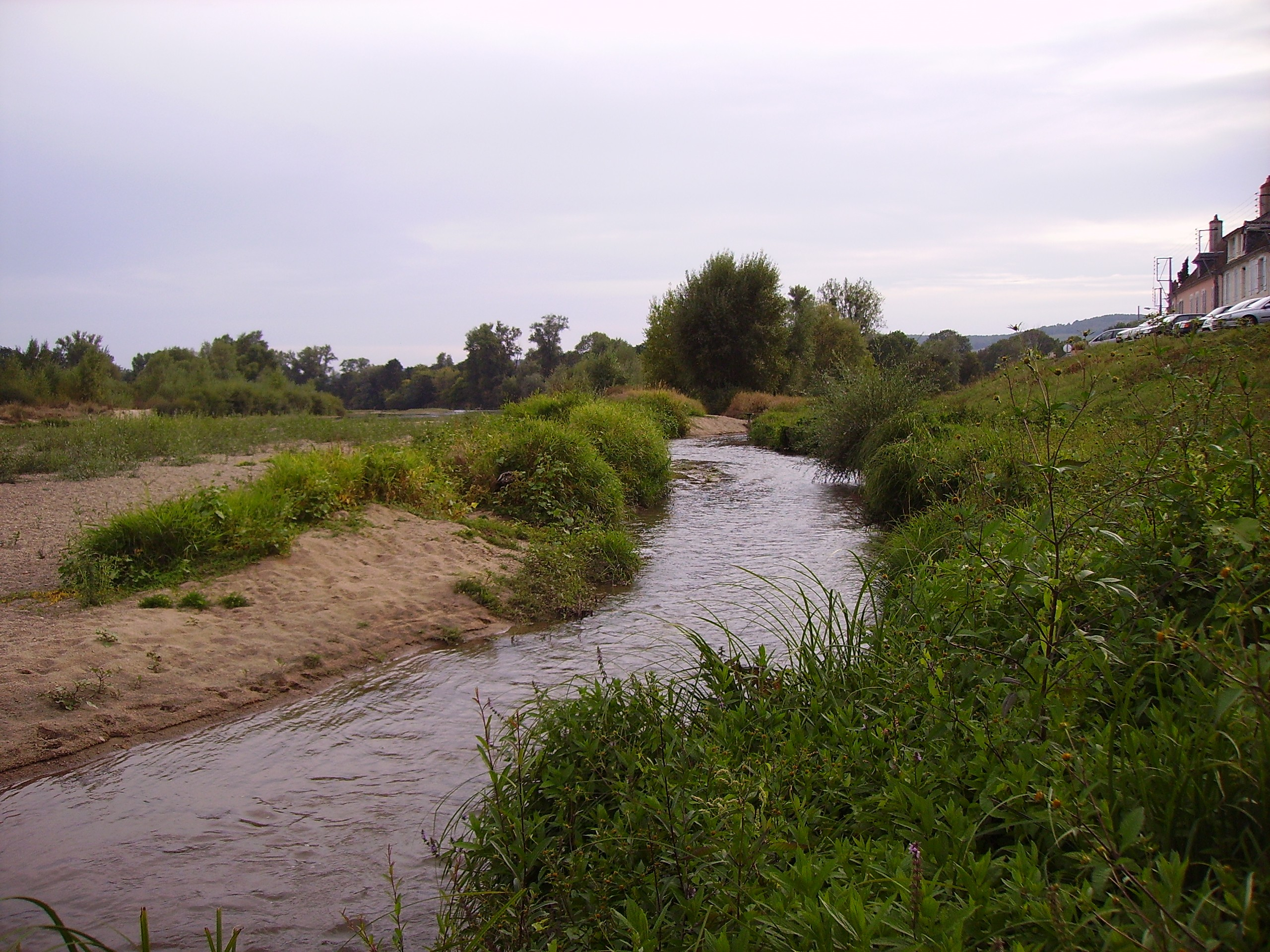

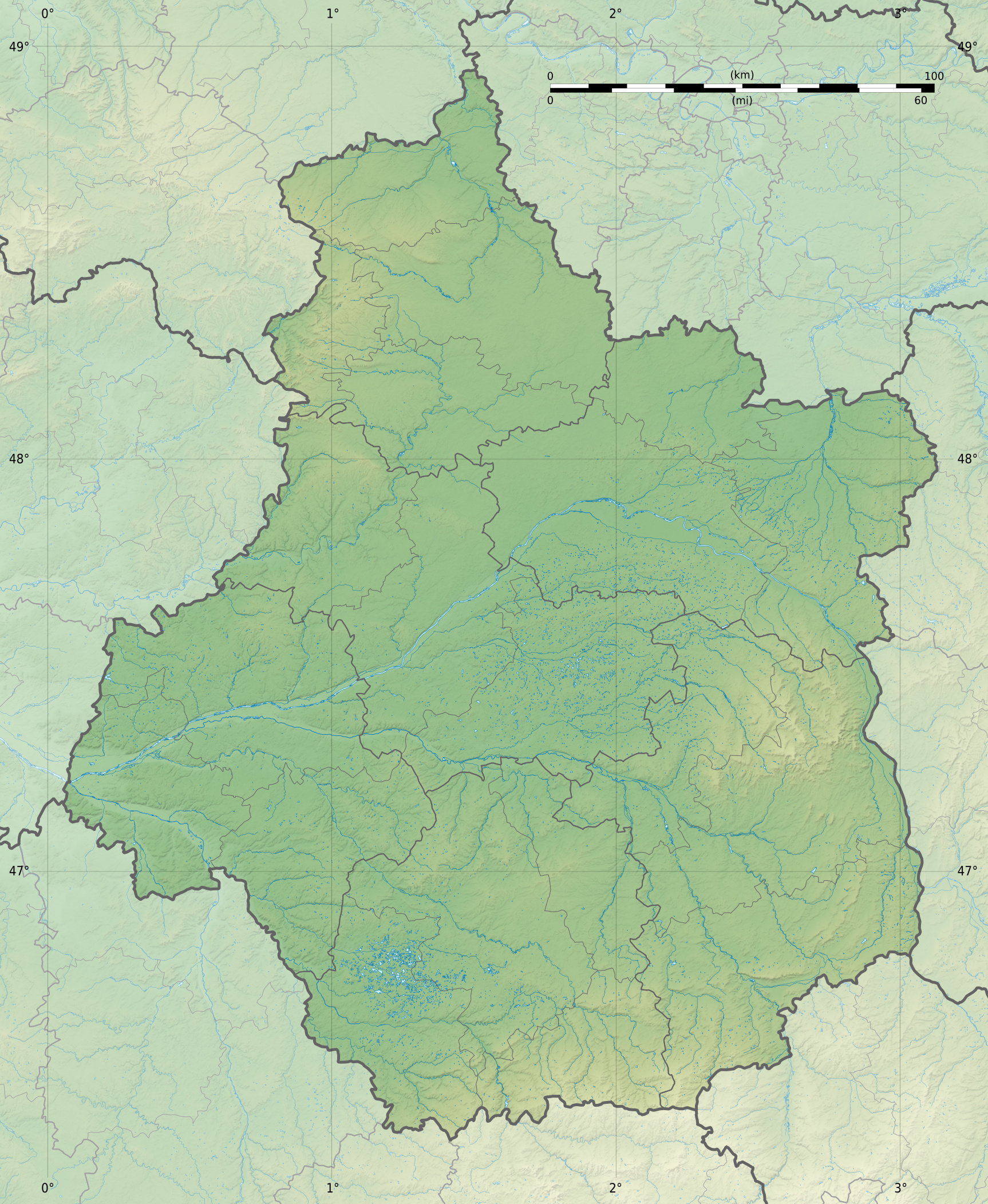
- Location within France Location within Centre-Val de Loire

Location
- Country: France

Physical characteristics
- Source
  - location: Nérondes
  - coordinates: 46°59′46″N 02°50′59″E
  - elevation: 225 m (738 ft)
- Mouth
  - location: Loire
  - coordinates: 47°20′10″N 02°51′56″E
  - elevation: 145 m (476 ft)
- Length: 57.7 km (35.9 mi)
- Basin size: 392 km^{2} (151 sq mi)
- Discharge
  - average: 2.84 m^{3}/s (100 cu ft/s)

Basin features
- Progression: Loire→ Atlantic Ocean

The Vauvise (French pronunciation: [voviz]) is a 57.7 km (35.9 mi) long river in the Cher department in central France. Its source is at Nérondes. It flows generally north. It is a left tributary of the Loire, into which it flows at Saint-Satur, near Sancerre.

== Communes along its course ==
This list is ordered from source to mouth: Nérondes, Chassy, Laverdines, Villequiers, Couy, Garigny, Jussy-le-Chaudrier, Précy, Sancergues, Saint-Martin-des-Champs, Herry, Feux, Saint-Bouize, Thauvenay, Ménétréol-sous-Sancerre, Sancerre, Saint-Satur
