= Thauvenay =

- Commune
- Location of Thauvenay
- Location within France Location within Centre-Val de Loire
- Coordinates: 47°18′20″N 2°52′08″E
- Country: France
- Region: Centre-Val de Loire
- Department: Cher
- Arrondissement: Bourges
- Canton: Sancerre
- Intercommunality: CC Pays Fort Sancerrois Val de Loire

Government
  - Mayor (2020–2026): Gabrielle Mattellini
- Area^{1}: 9.86 km^{2} (3.81 sq mi)
- Elevation: 158 m (518 ft)
- Highest elevation: 295 m (968 ft)
- Lowest elevation: 142 m (466 ft)
- Population (2023): 313
  - Density: 31.7/km^{2} (82.2/sq mi)
- Time zone: UTC+01:00 (CET)
  - Summer (DST): UTC+02:00 (CEST)
- INSEE/Postal code: 18262 /18300
- ^{1} French Land Register data, which excludes lakes, ponds, glaciers > 1 km^{2} (0.386 sq mi or 247 acres) and river estuaries.

Thauvenay (French pronunciation: [tovnɛ]) is a commune in the Cher department in the Centre-Val de Loire region of France.

== Geography ==
A winegrowing and farming village situated on the banks of both the river Vauvise and the Loire lateral canal, about 33 miles (53 km) northeast of Bourges at the junction of the D920 with the D206, D202 and the D159 roads. The commune is one of 14 permitted to grow grapes for Sancerre AOC wine. The Vauvise flows northwest through the middle of the commune; the Loire forms part of its northeastern boundary.

== Population ==
Historical population
Year	Pop.	±% p.a.
1968	255	—
1975	293	+2.00%
1982	274	−0.95%
1990	295	+0.93%
1999	302	+0.26%
2007	342	+1.57%
2012	345	+0.17%
2017	332	−0.77%
2023	313	−0.98%
Source: INSEE

== Sights ==
- A church dating from the twentieth century.
- A twelfth-century chapel.
- An eighteenth-century chateau.
- A restored public washhouse.

== See also ==
- Communes of the Cher department
