= Jussy-le-Chaudrier =

- Commune
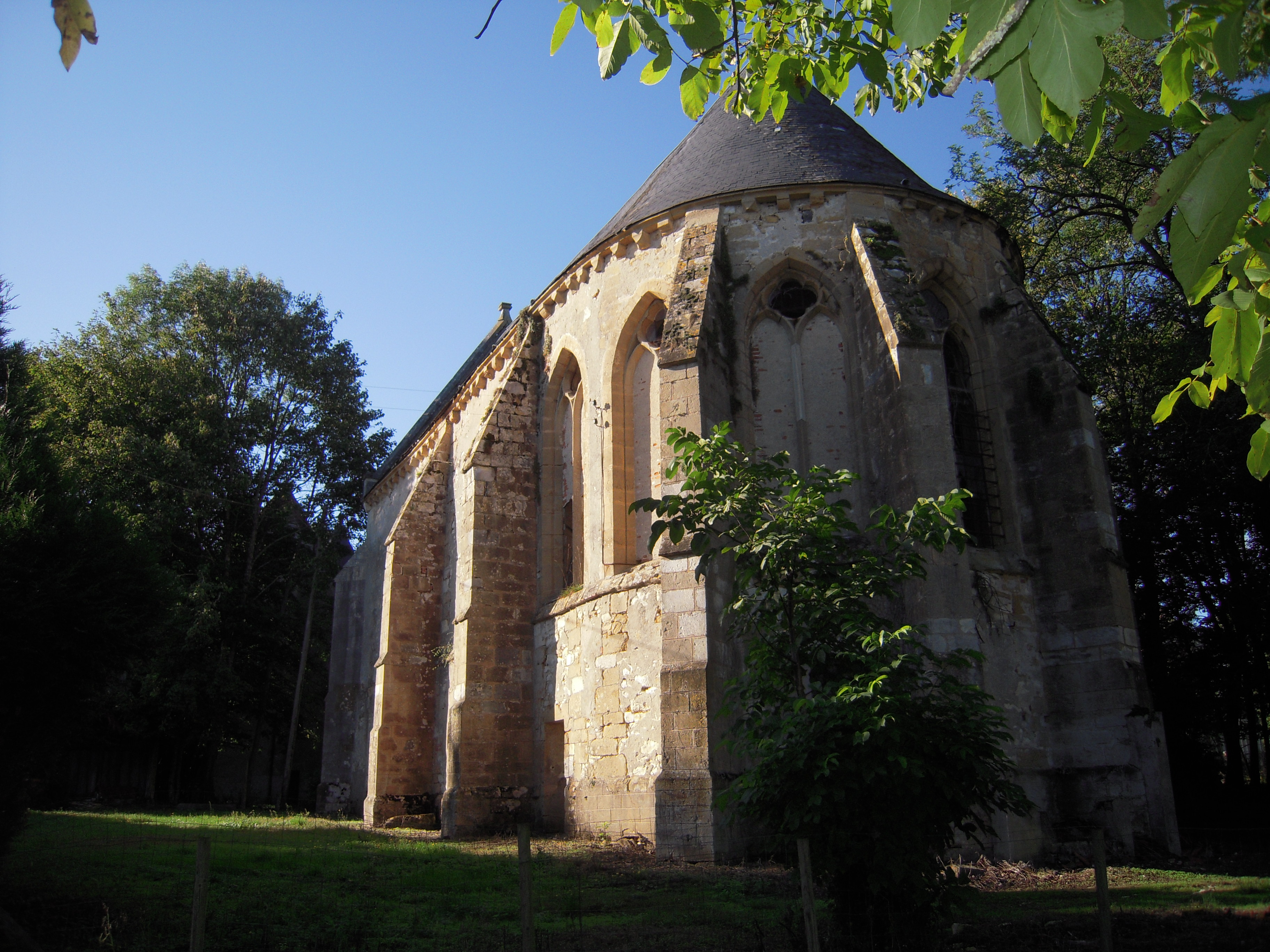
- The Commandry of Jussy-le-Chaudrier, a Templar chapel
- Location of Jussy-le-Chaudrier
- Location within France Location within Centre-Val de Loire
- Coordinates: 47°07′42″N 2°56′06″E
- Country: France
- Region: Centre-Val de Loire
- Department: Cher
- Arrondissement: Bourges
- Canton: Avord

Government
  - Mayor (2020–2026): Jean-François Pasqué
- Area^{1}: 25.73 km^{2} (9.93 sq mi)
- Elevation: 191 m (627 ft)
- Highest elevation: 209 m (686 ft)
- Lowest elevation: 165 m (541 ft)
- Population (2023): 579
  - Density: 22.5/km^{2} (58.3/sq mi)
- Time zone: UTC+01:00 (CET)
  - Summer (DST): UTC+02:00 (CEST)
- INSEE/Postal code: 18120 /18140
- ^{1} French Land Register data, which excludes lakes, ponds, glaciers > 1 km^{2} (0.386 sq mi or 247 acres) and river estuaries.

Jussy-le-Chaudrier (French pronunciation: [ʒysi lə ʃodʁije]) is a commune in the Cher department in the Centre-Val de Loire region of France.

== Geography ==
An area of forestry and farming, comprising the village and several hamlets situated in the valley of the river Vauvise, some 23 miles (37 km) east of Bourges, at the junction of the D53, D25 and the D920 roads. The river forms part of the commune's western and northern borders.

== Population ==
Historical population
Year	Pop.	±% p.a.
1968	645	—
1975	565	−1.87%
1982	545	−0.51%
1990	515	−0.71%
1999	526	+0.24%
2007	609	+1.85%
2012	635	+0.84%
2017	607	−0.90%
2023	579	−0.78%
Source: INSEE

== Sights ==
- The church of St. Julien, dating from the sixteenth century.
- A watermill at Bion.
- Bordes chapel and tower, all that remains of a thirteenth-century commandery temple.

== See also ==
- Communes of the Cher department
