= Précy =

- Commune
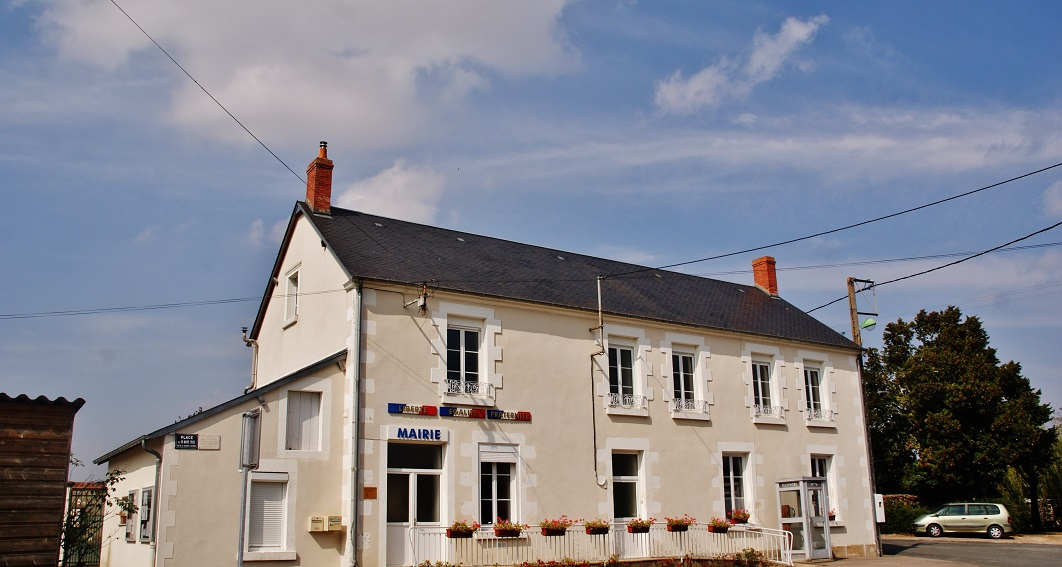
- The town hall in Précy
- Location of Précy
- Location within France Location within Centre-Val de Loire
- Coordinates: 47°06′01″N 2°55′47″E
- Country: France
- Region: Centre-Val de Loire
- Department: Cher
- Arrondissement: Bourges
- Canton: Avord

Government
  - Mayor (2020–2026): Joël Vignel
- Area^{1}: 14.45 km^{2} (5.58 sq mi)
- Elevation: 150 m (490 ft)
- Highest elevation: 197 m (646 ft)
- Lowest elevation: 168 m (551 ft)
- Population (2023): 353
  - Density: 24.4/km^{2} (63.3/sq mi)
- Time zone: UTC+01:00 (CET)
  - Summer (DST): UTC+02:00 (CEST)
- INSEE/Postal code: 18184 /18140
- ^{1} French Land Register data, which excludes lakes, ponds, glaciers > 1 km^{2} (0.386 sq mi or 247 acres) and river estuaries.

Précy (French pronunciation: [pʁesi]) is a commune in the Cher department in the Centre-Val de Loire region of France.

== Geography ==
An area of forestry and farming comprising the village and a couple of hamlets situated some 23 miles (37 km) east of Bourges, at the junction of the D51, D920, D48 and the D81 roads. The river Vauvise forms all of the commune's northern boundary.

== Population ==
Historical population
| Year | Pop. | ±% p.a. |
|---|---|---|
| 1968 | 372 | — |
| 1975 | 285 | −3.73% |
| 1982 | 262 | −1.19% |
| 1990 | 301 | +1.75% |
| 1999 | 312 | +0.40% |
| 2007 | 341 | +1.12% |
| 2012 | 333 | −0.47% |
| 2017 | 345 | +0.71% |
| 2023 | 353 | +0.38% |
Source: INSEE

== Sights ==
- The church of St. Louis, dating from the sixteenth century.
- A feudal motte at the place known as Château de Faye.
- A seventeenth-century chateau.
- A converted watermill.

== See also ==
- Communes of the Cher department
