= Sancergues =

- Commune
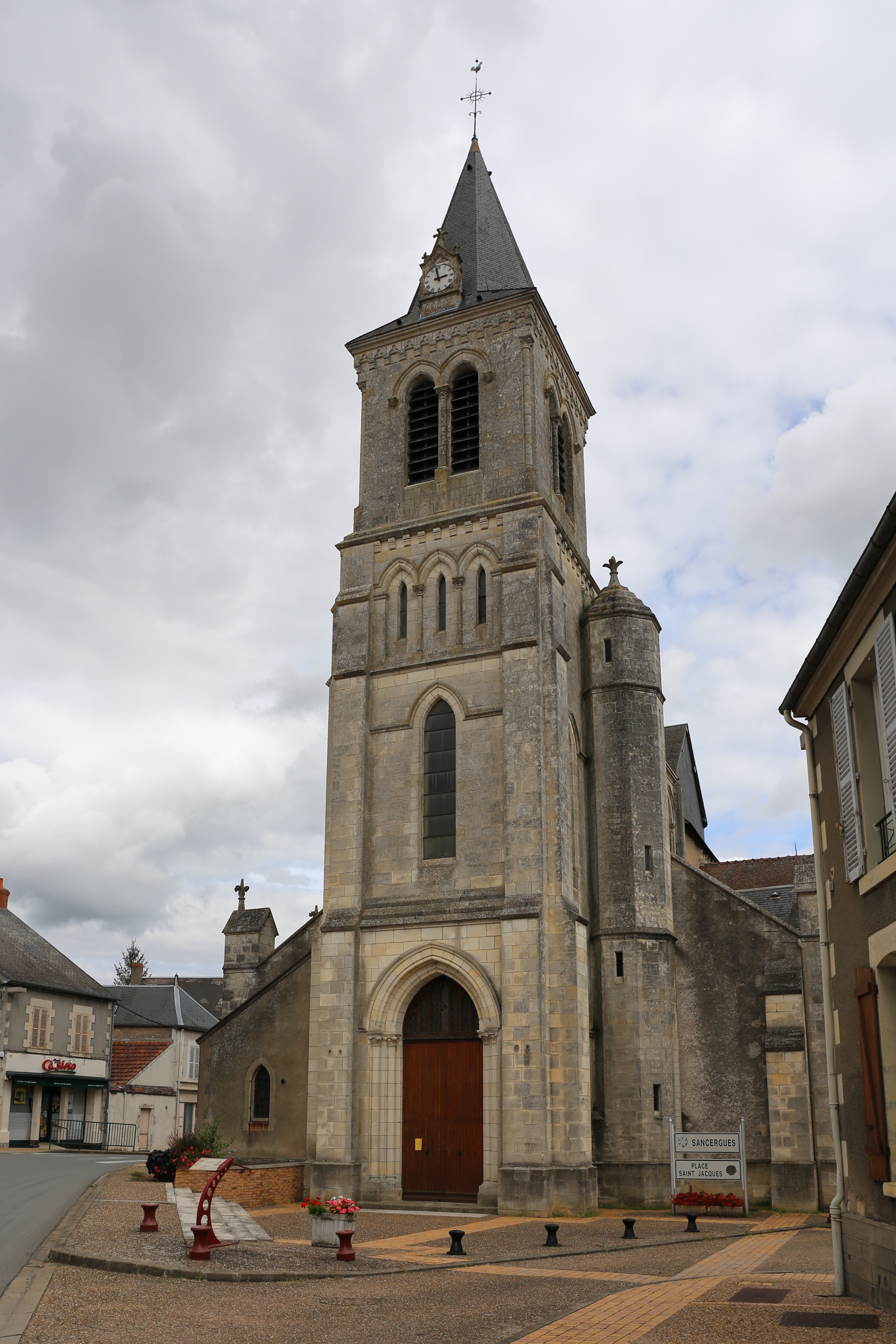
- The church of Saint-Jacques, in Sancergues

- Coat of arms
- Location of Sancergues
- Location within France Location within Centre-Val de Loire
- Coordinates: 47°09′22″N 2°55′03″E
- Country: France
- Region: Centre-Val de Loire
- Department: Cher
- Arrondissement: Bourges
- Canton: Avord

Government
  - Mayor (2020–2026): Jean-Luc Charache
- Area^{1}: 15.53 km^{2} (6.00 sq mi)
- Highest elevation: 222 m (728 ft)
- Lowest elevation: 158 m (518 ft)
- Population (2023): 620
  - Density: 40/km^{2} (100/sq mi)
- Time zone: UTC+01:00 (CET)
  - Summer (DST): UTC+02:00 (CEST)
- INSEE/Postal code: 18240 /18140
- ^{1} French Land Register data, which excludes lakes, ponds, glaciers > 1 km^{2} (0.386 sq mi or 247 acres) and river estuaries.

Sancergues (French pronunciation: [sɑ̃sɛʁɡ]) is a commune in the Cher department in the Centre-Val de Loire region, France.

== Geography ==
A farming area comprising a village and several hamlets situated about 20 miles (32 km) northeast of Bourges, at the junction of the N151 with the D72, D6 and the D44 roads. The commune is on the ancient pilgrimage route known as St. James' Way and lies on the left bank of the Vauvise, which forms most of the commune's eastern border.

== Population ==
Historical population
Year	Pop.	±% p.a.
1968	863	—
1975	942	+1.26%
1982	865	−1.21%
1990	807	−0.86%
1999	718	−1.29%
2007	698	−0.35%
2012	697	−0.03%
2017	649	−1.42%
2023	620	−0.76%
Source: INSEE

== Sights ==
- The church of St. Jacques and St. Cyr, dating from the twelfth century.
- A feudal motte at Augy.
- Augy chateau, home of Nobel laureate Roger Martin du Gard for 27 years.

== See also ==
- Communes of the Cher department
