= Garigny =

- Commune
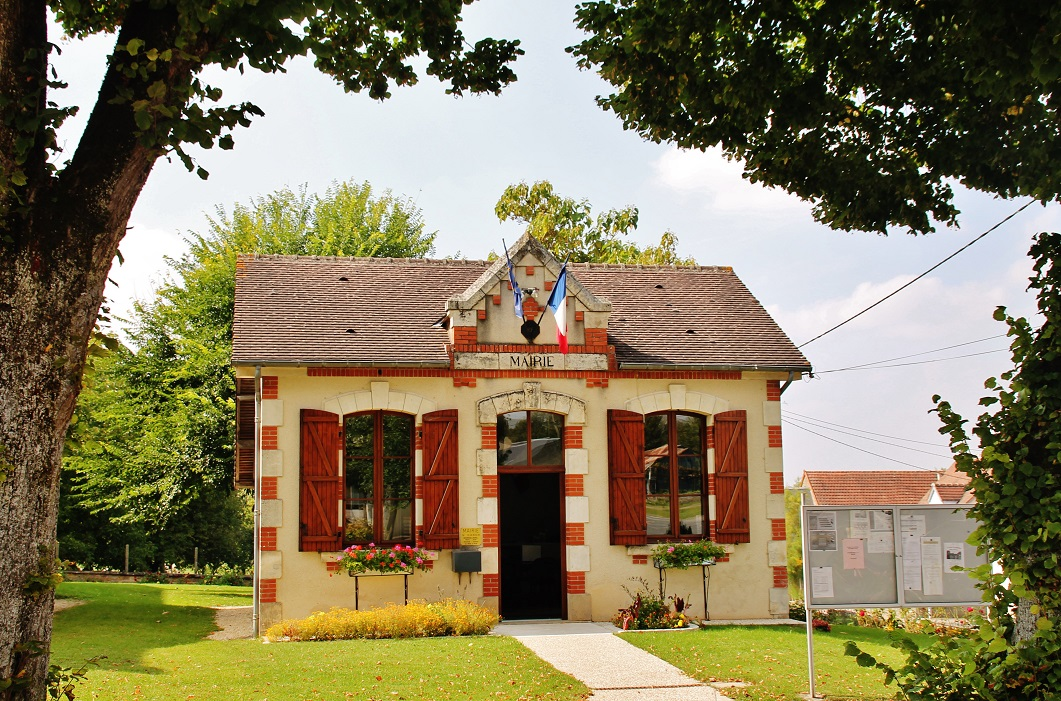
- The town hall in Garigny
- Location of Garigny
- Location within France Location within Centre-Val de Loire
- Coordinates: 47°05′16″N 2°53′18″E
- Country: France
- Region: Centre-Val de Loire
- Department: Cher
- Arrondissement: Bourges
- Canton: Avord

Government
  - Mayor (2020–2026): Monique Vasicek
- Area^{1}: 19.66 km^{2} (7.59 sq mi)
- Elevation: 184 m (604 ft)
- Highest elevation: 202 m (663 ft)
- Lowest elevation: 171 m (561 ft)
- Population (2023): 219
  - Density: 11.1/km^{2} (28.9/sq mi)
- Time zone: UTC+01:00 (CET)
  - Summer (DST): UTC+02:00 (CEST)
- INSEE/Postal code: 18099 /18140
- ^{1} French Land Register data, which excludes lakes, ponds, glaciers > 1 km^{2} (0.386 sq mi or 247 acres) and river estuaries.

Garigny (French pronunciation: [ɡaʁiɲi]) is a commune in the Cher department in the Centre-Val de Loire region of France about 20 miles (32 km) east of Bourges. The river Vauvise flows east through the northern part of the commune.

== Population ==
Historical population
Year	Pop.	±% p.a.
1968	307	—
1975	266	−2.03%
1982	222	−2.55%
1990	245	+1.24%
1999	248	+0.14%
2007	222	−1.37%
2012	240	+1.57%
2017	236	−0.34%
2023	219	−1.24%
Source: INSEE

== See also ==
- Communes of the Cher department
