= Herry, Cher =

Herry
- Commune
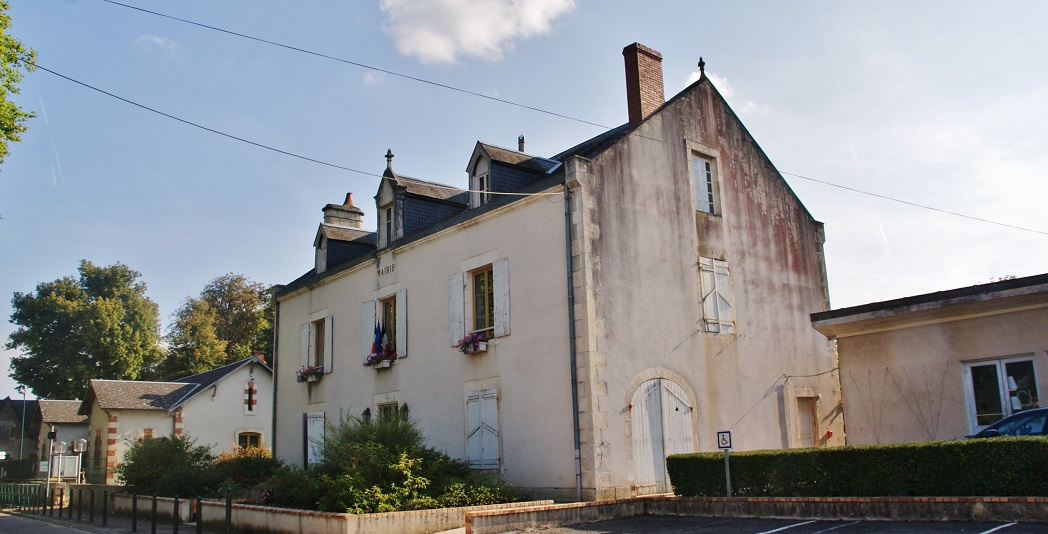
- The town hall in Herry

- Coat of arms
- Location of Herry
- Location within France Location within Centre-Val de Loire
- Coordinates: 47°13′03″N 2°57′16″E
- Country: France
- Region: Centre-Val de Loire
- Department: Cher
- Arrondissement: Bourges
- Canton: Avord

Government
  - Mayor (2023–2026): Etienne De Choulot
- Area^{1}: 49.87 km^{2} (19.25 sq mi)
- Elevation: 167 m (548 ft)
- Highest elevation: 188 m (617 ft)
- Lowest elevation: 147 m (482 ft)
- Population (2023): 958
  - Density: 19.2/km^{2} (49.8/sq mi)
- Time zone: UTC+01:00 (CET)
  - Summer (DST): UTC+02:00 (CEST)
- INSEE/Postal code: 18110 /18140
- ^{1} French Land Register data, which excludes lakes, ponds, glaciers > 1 km^{2} (0.386 sq mi or 247 acres) and river estuaries.

Herry (French pronunciation: [ɛʁi]) is a commune in the Cher department in the Centre-Val de Loire region of France.

== Geography ==
An area of forestry and farming, comprising the village and a dozen hamlets situated by the banks of the canal latéral à la Loire, some 27 miles (43 km) northeast of Bourges, at the junction of the D7, D920 and the D52 roads. The river Vauvise forms most of the commune's western border and the Loire most of its eastern border. A nature reserve, the Val de Loire National Nature Reserve was created here in 1995, along 12 miles (19 km) of the Loire valley.

== Population ==
Historical population
Year	Pop.	±% p.a.
1968	1,097	—
1975	964	−1.83%
1982	1,024	+0.87%
1990	991	−0.41%
1999	1,016	+0.28%
2007	1,075	+0.71%
2012	1,009	−1.26%
2017	988	−0.42%
2023	958	−0.51%
Source: INSEE

== Sights ==
- The church of St. Loup, dating from the thirteenth century.
- The fifteenth-century château.
- An ancient abbey at Chalivoy.

== See also ==
- Communes of the Cher department
