= Couy =

- Commune
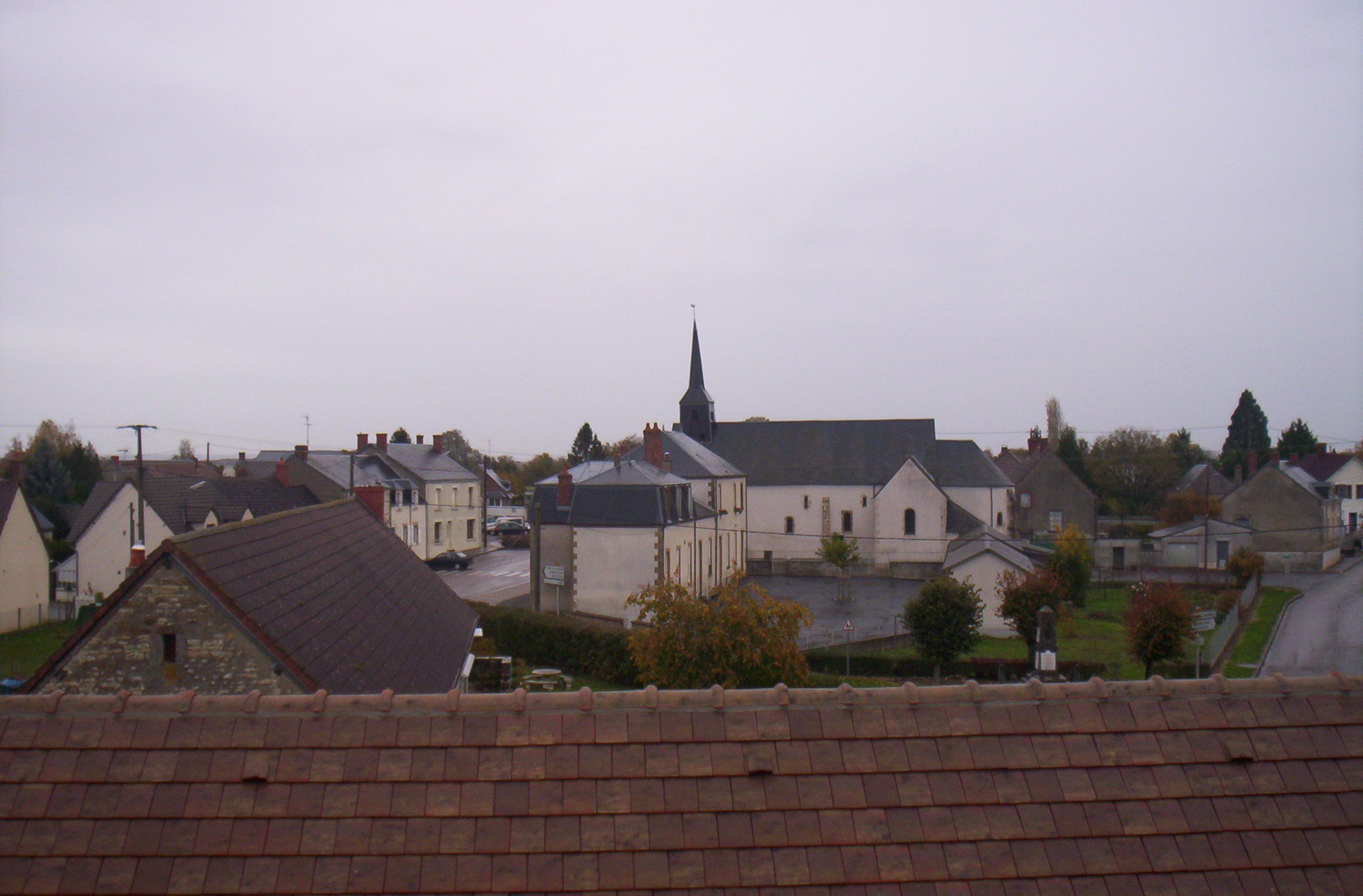
- A general view of Couy

- Coat of arms
- Location of Couy
- Location within France Location within Centre-Val de Loire
- Coordinates: 47°07′05″N 2°49′35″E
- Country: France
- Region: Centre-Val de Loire
- Department: Cher
- Arrondissement: Bourges
- Canton: Avord

Government
  - Mayor (2020–2026): Philippe Policard
- Area^{1}: 18.36 km^{2} (7.09 sq mi)
- Highest elevation: 219 m (719 ft)
- Lowest elevation: 171 m (561 ft)
- Population (2023): 369
  - Density: 20.1/km^{2} (52.1/sq mi)
- Time zone: UTC+01:00 (CET)
  - Summer (DST): UTC+02:00 (CEST)
- INSEE/Postal code: 18077 /18140
- ^{1} French Land Register data, which excludes lakes, ponds, glaciers > 1 km^{2} (0.386 sq mi or 247 acres) and river estuaries.

Couy (French pronunciation: [kwi]) is a commune in the Cher department in the Centre-Val de Loire region of France.

== Geography ==
A farming area comprising the village and one hamlet situated some 19 miles (31 km) east of Bourges at the junction of the D53 and the D72 roads. The river Vauvise flows northeastward through the eastern part of the commune.

== Population ==
Historical population
Year	Pop.	±% p.a.
1968	417	—
1975	371	−1.66%
1982	305	−2.76%
1990	308	+0.12%
1999	334	+0.90%
2007	367	+1.18%
2012	374	+0.38%
2017	355	−1.04%
2023	369	+0.65%
Source: INSEE

== Sights ==
- The church of St. Martin, dating from the thirteenth century.
- The eighteenth-century manorhouse at Creu.

== See also ==
- Communes of the Cher department
