= Saint-Martin-des-Champs, Cher =

Saint-Martin-des-Champs
- Commune
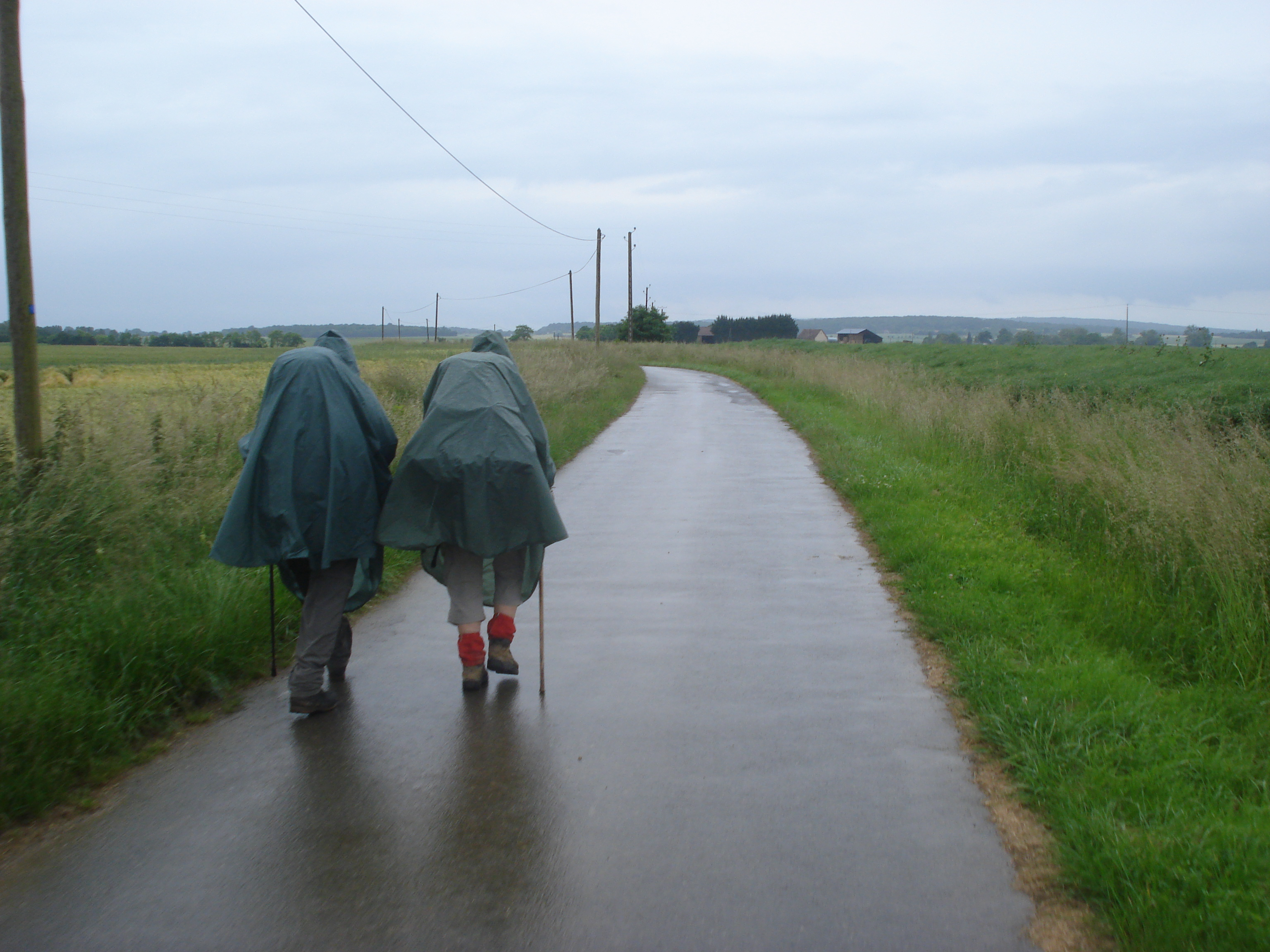
- Pilgrims on the Way of St. James
- Location of Saint-Martin-des-Champs
- Location within France Location within Centre-Val de Loire
- Coordinates: 47°09′30″N 2°55′24″E
- Country: France
- Region: Centre-Val de Loire
- Department: Cher
- Arrondissement: Bourges
- Canton: Avord

Government
  - Mayor (2020–2026): André Delavault
- Area^{1}: 18.96 km^{2} (7.32 sq mi)
- Elevation: 174 m (571 ft)
- Highest elevation: 188 m (617 ft)
- Lowest elevation: 159 m (522 ft)
- Population (2023): 307
  - Density: 16.2/km^{2} (41.9/sq mi)
- Time zone: UTC+01:00 (CET)
  - Summer (DST): UTC+02:00 (CEST)
- INSEE/Postal code: 18224 /18140
- ^{1} French Land Register data, which excludes lakes, ponds, glaciers > 1 km^{2} (0.386 sq mi or 247 acres) and river estuaries.

Saint-Martin-des-Champs (French pronunciation: [sɛ̃ maʁtɛ̃ de ʃɑ̃]) is a commune in the Cher department in central France.

== Geography ==
The village lies on the right bank of the Vauvise, which forms most of the commune's western border.

== Population ==
Historical population
Year	Pop.	±% p.a.
1968	445	—
1975	391	−1.83%
1982	356	−1.33%
1990	335	−0.76%
1999	331	−0.13%
2007	341	+0.37%
2012	314	−1.64%
2017	304	−0.65%
2023	307	+0.16%
Source: INSEE

== See also ==
- Communes of the Cher department
