= Ménétréol-sous-Sancerre =

- Commune
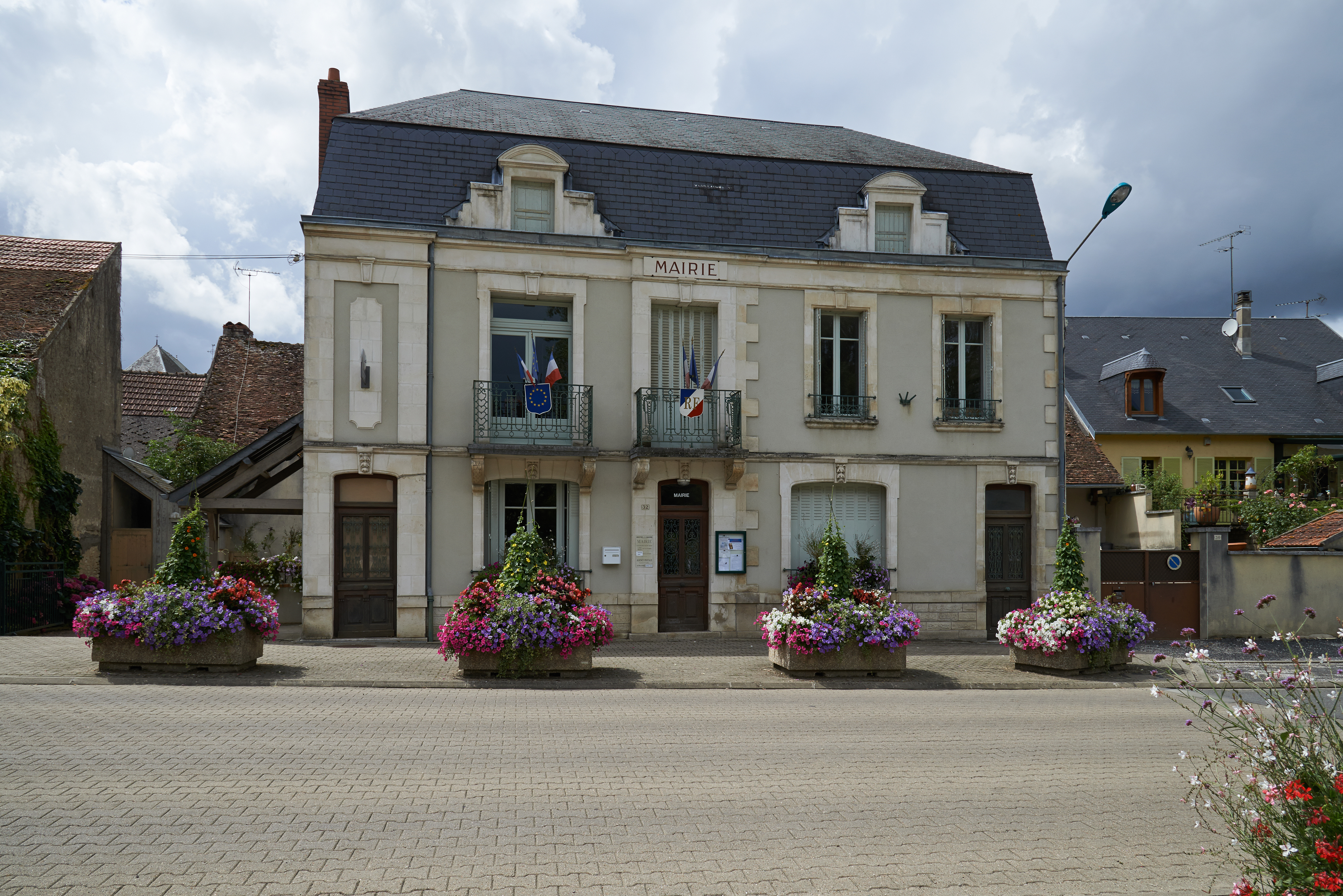
- The town hall in Ménétréol-sous-Sancerre
- Location of Ménétréol-sous-Sancerre
- Location within France Location within Centre-Val de Loire
- Coordinates: 47°19′07″N 2°51′24″E
- Country: France
- Region: Centre-Val de Loire
- Department: Cher
- Arrondissement: Bourges
- Canton: Sancerre
- Intercommunality: CC Pays Fort Sancerrois Val de Loire

Government
  - Mayor (2020–2026): Pascale Marq
- Area^{1}: 5.67 km^{2} (2.19 sq mi)
- Elevation: 185 m (607 ft)
- Highest elevation: 252 m (827 ft)
- Lowest elevation: 142 m (466 ft)
- Population (2023): 292
  - Density: 51.5/km^{2} (133/sq mi)
- Time zone: UTC+01:00 (CET)
  - Summer (DST): UTC+02:00 (CEST)
- INSEE/Postal code: 18146 /18300
- ^{1} French Land Register data, which excludes lakes, ponds, glaciers > 1 km^{2} (0.386 sq mi or 247 acres) and river estuaries.

Ménétréol-sous-Sancerre (French pronunciation: [menetʁeɔl su sɑ̃sɛʁ], literally Ménétréol under Sancerre) is a commune in the Cher department in the Centre-Val de Loire region of France.

== Geography ==
A winegrowing and farming village situated by the banks of the rivers Vauvise and Loire and the Loire lateral canal, some 26 miles (42 km) northeast of Bourges, at the junction of the D9 with the D920 and the D307 roads. The Sauvignon blanc grapes grown here are used for Sancerre AOC wines.

== Population ==
Historical population
Year	Pop.	±% p.a.
1968	390	—
1975	436	+1.61%
1982	389	−1.62%
1990	353	−1.21%
1999	354	+0.03%
2007	366	+0.42%
2012	368	+0.11%
2017	315	−3.06%
2023	292	−1.26%
Source: INSEE

== Sights ==
- The church of St. Hilaire, dating from the seventeenth century.
- The restored watermill.
- The twelfth-century chateau des Aubelles and its chapel.
- The small port on the canal.
- The nineteenth-century railway viaduct.

== See also ==
- Communes of the Cher department
