= Tasciaca =

Ancient Gallo-Roman settlements in present-day France

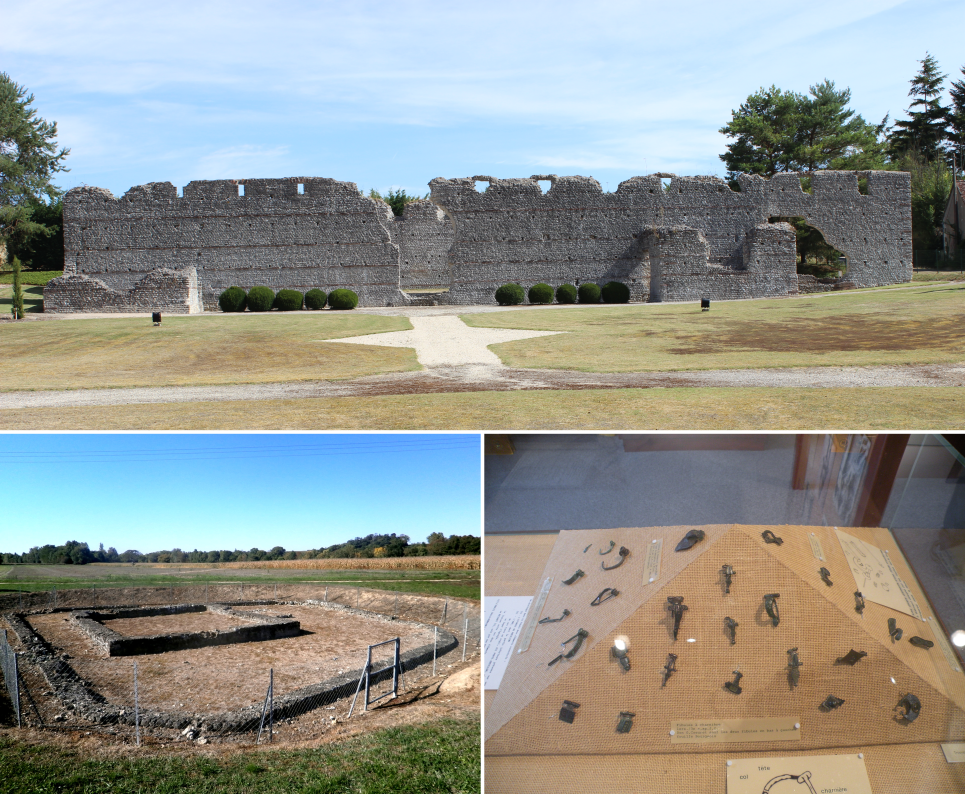
- From top to bottom and left to right: the Mazelles ruins; the Pouillé temple and a collection of fibulae at the Thésée archaeological museum.

- Location within France
- 47°19′37″N 1°18′16″E
- Location: Roman Empire
- Region: Gallia Lugdunensis Centre-Val de Loire

Tasciaca was an ancient vicus (secondary settlement) characterized by a series of Gallo-Roman settlements located in the communes of Thésée, Pouillé, and Monthou-sur-Cher, on either side of the Cher River, in the French department of Loir-et-Cher in the Centre-Val de Loire region.

Tasciaca appears on the Peutinger table, designating a stopover from Avaricum (Bourges) to Caesarodunum (Tours). The settlement, on the border of the civitates of the Turons, Carnutes, and Bituriges Cubes, seems to have been developing since the beginning of our era; it was very active during the High Empire, with significant production of common ceramics, glassware, and metal objects, before declining from the 2nd century onwards, without however being abandoned under the Merovingians.

On the left bank of the Cher, the site includes a fanum, a basin with a possibly religious role and at least one well, some 40 potter's kilns whose ceramics are found in several archaeological sites in the Centre-Val de Loire region, as well as other facilities with less well-documented functions, such as buildings with multiple rooms, several fords (although they cannot be dated), perhaps two piers and a hypothetical bridge in the Cher riverbed. The best-known feature of the site, however, is the Mazelles (or Maselles) complex, a monumental group of buildings on the right bank of the Cher, possibly linked to navigation on the river or road traffic, the largest of which has a footprint of almost fifty meters long by some twenty meters wide. Other remains, possibly including a temple, identified in the early 2000s to the west of the site previously located in Thésée and Pouillé, show that Tasciaca appears to have extended downstream into the neighboring commune of Monthou-sur-Cher, stretching for over two kilometers along the Cher. Everything remains to be discovered about the heart of this agglomeration, its public buildings, and its function(s).

The Roman ruins at Les Mazelles, owned by the Loir-et-Cher departmental council, are listed as a historic monument in the 1840 list. The fanum and kiln area at Pouillé, owned by the same local authority, is in a protected archaeological zone, but some of its remains are in an advanced state of deterioration.

== Geographical and historical context ==
=== A river valley between two limestone hillsides ===
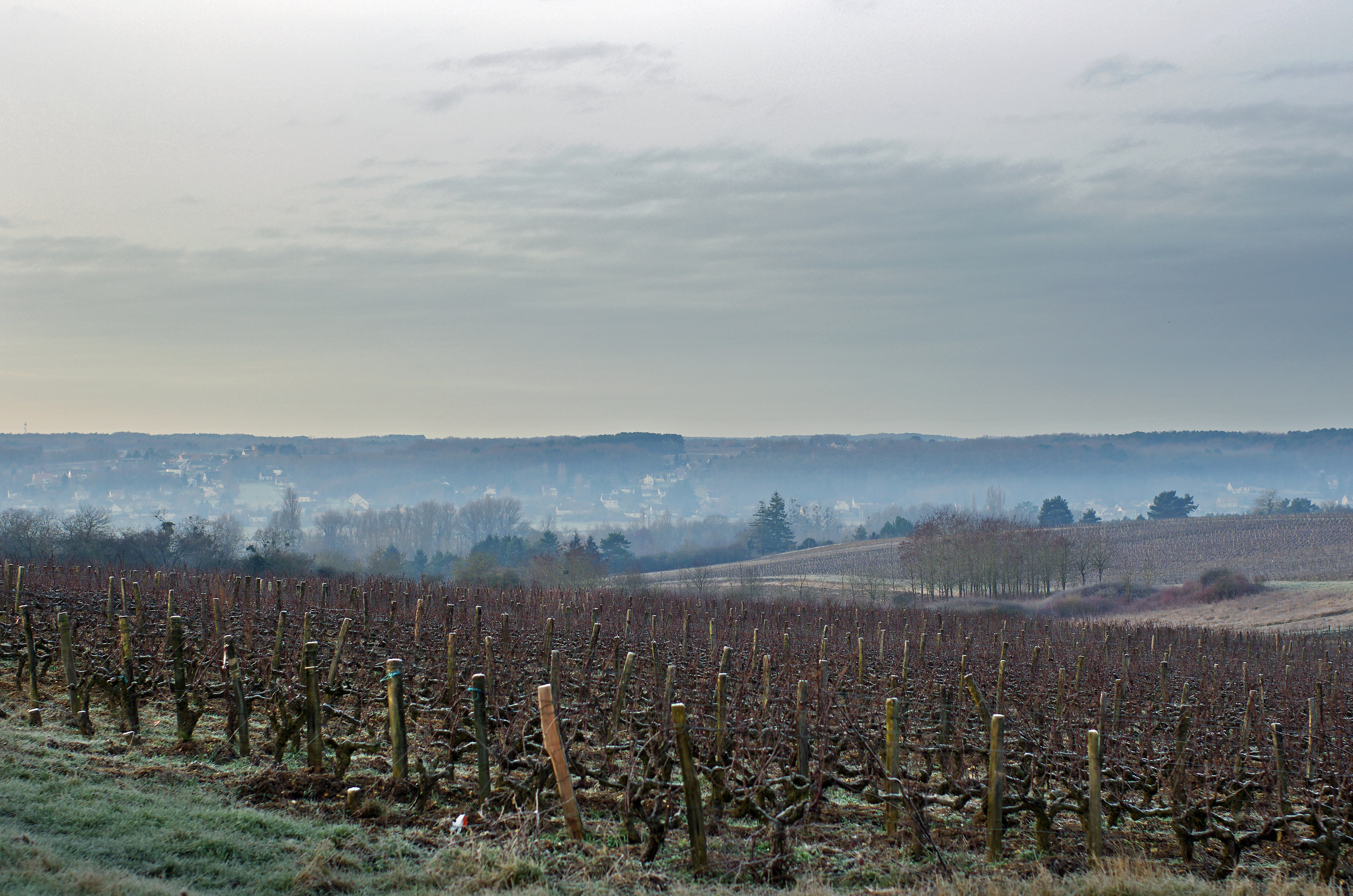
The Cher valley at Thésée.

The Tasciaca site is located in the Cher valley, which was canalized in the 19th century and is now around 50 m wide. This valley, composed of Quaternary alluvial deposits brought down by the Cher, cuts deeply into the limestone plateau (Turonian and later), which rises to an altitude of around 80 m on the northern edge of Thésée and towards Pouillé to the south, where the valley settles at 65 m at the Pouillé archaeological site and drops to 61 m at Monthou-sur-Cher. Between the D176 to the north and the D17 to the south, the valley is around 1.3 km wide at the site. Thésée is also located at the confluence of the Cher and the Renne, a small right bank tributary rising in the commune of Sassay.

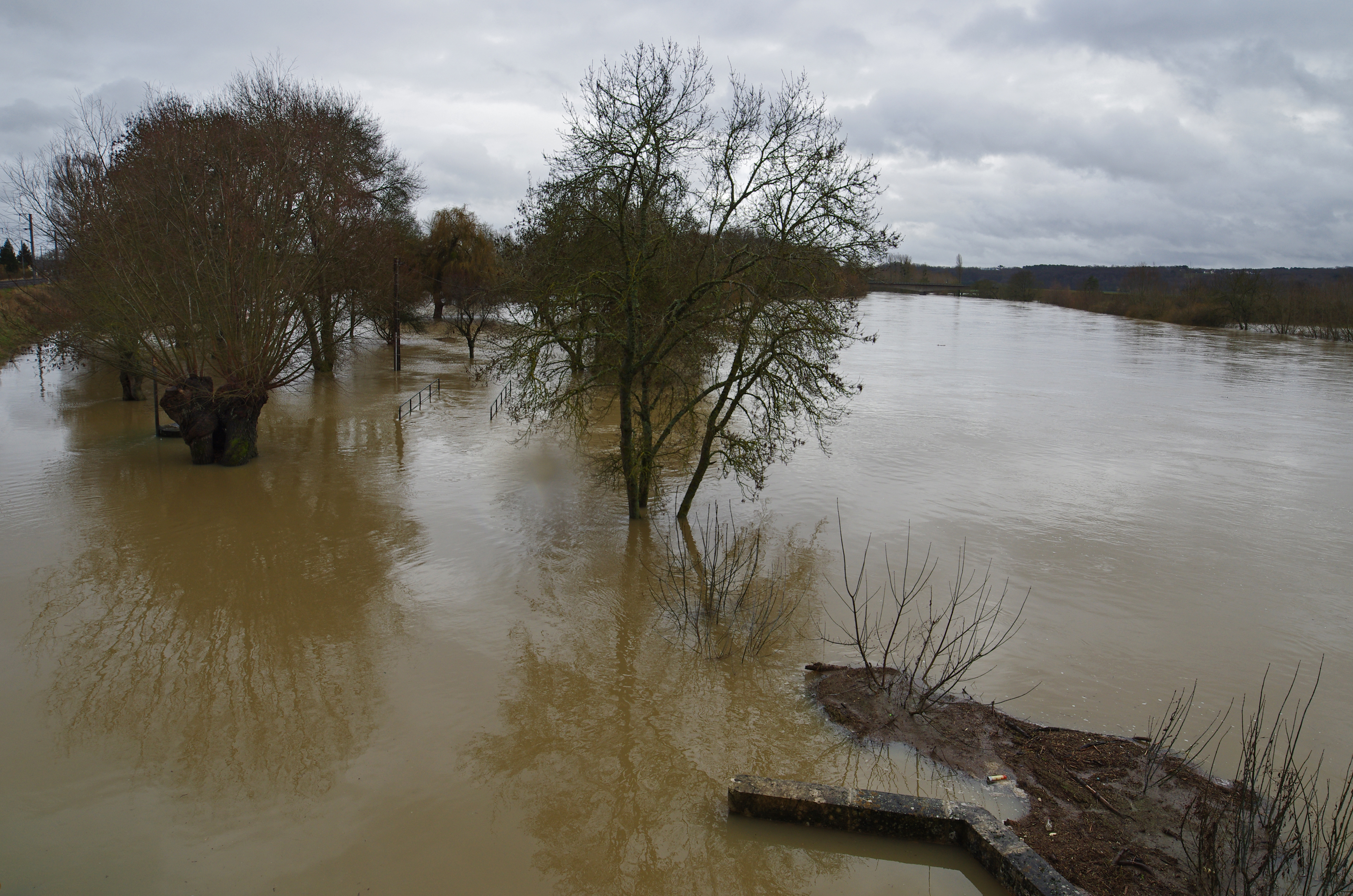
The Cher in flood at Thésée in 2013.

These geological features mean that the materials used in Antiquity can be found on site: sand in the valley, lime, and limestone in the lower slopes for building purposes, and decalcification clay on the upper slopes or in the valley bottoms under the alluvium for pottery.

The remains are located in the valley, but also at the beginning of the slopes of the hillsides, in three different nuclei: Monthou-sur-Cher (le Moulin du Ru), Pouillé (les Bordes and la Soler) and Thésée (le Grand Cimetière and the village, extending westwards to Les Mazelles after a break of several hundred meters). Although some parts of the valley were regularly flooded in the 21st century, it seems that in ancient times these areas were less prone to flooding, as the average level of the unchannelled Cher was lower.

=== A strategic site at the crossroads of several regions ===
Tasciaca in the civitas of the Turones in red; the Indre-et-Loire département in green.

Under the Roman Empire, river navigation was a favored mode of transport, supported and accompanied by a road network, a large part of which, in Gallic territories, was inherited from before the conquest. The Cher valley was on a major route from Lugdunum (Lyon) via Bourges to the Atlantic Ocean and the English Channel.

The Tasciaca site stretches along both banks of the Cher. Since the Middle Ages, the river has marked the boundary of several dioceses: parishes on the right bank of the Cher came under the diocese of Orléans, and those on the left bank under the diocese of Tours. These dioceses are generally based on the boundaries of the civitates of Roman administration in Antiquity. In this hypothesis, the northern part of the site would have belonged to the civitas of the Carnutes and later the Aureliani, while the southern part would have been part of the civitas of the Turones. However, despite the lack of certainty, researchers agree that the entire Tasciaca site belongs to the Turon territory.

Be that as it may, the town occupies a special geographical position, reinforced by its proximity to the territorial limits of the powerful Bituriges Cubes: the Turones, Carnutes and Aureliani belong to the province of Gaul Lyonnaise, while the Bituriges Cubes belong to Gaul Aquitaine.

=== A stop on the Peutinger table ===
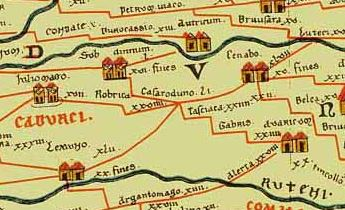
Extract from the Peutinger table mentioning Tasciaca.

The Peutinger table is a medieval parchment, a repeatedly updated copy of an ancient document, which depicts the main routes of the Roman Empire and the milestones on the way from one city to another. On the route from Avaricum (Bourges) to Casaroduno (for Caesarodunum, Tours), which in all likelihood follows the Cher valley from Foëcy, the consonance of the names and the distances mentioned, despite discrepancies in interpretation that may be due to errors made by the copyists of the Peutinger table, allows us to equate the Tasciaca station with Thésée, while the station to the right on the same route, labeled Gabris, most probably refers to Gièvres and/or Chabris.

For historian Jean Martin-Demézil, the name Tasciaca could derive from a Gallo-Roman toponym and the suffix -acum, the whole being declined in the plural. For Albert Dauzat and Charles Rostaing, it's the Latin anthroponym Tatius with the same suffix -acum.

=== Ancient sites on either side of Tasciaca in the Cher valley ===
The remains of Tasciaca are not the only evidence of human presence in this part of the Cher valley in antiquity. Even if reports, mostly from the middle of the 19th century and sometimes geographically imprecise, must be interpreted with caution, they testify to a dense occupation of the valley.

At Saint-Romain-sur-Cher, 4 km upstream from Thésée, on the same bank of the Cher, a village-street was occupied from at least Augustus to the end of the 1st century, with more than ten buildings and private baths, craft workshops and perhaps a mausoleum, arranged on either side of a road.

In the village of Pouillé, south of the Tasciaca artisanal hub, an aqueduct, burials, and remains of buried structures were reported in the 19th century. At Angé and Bourré, (Note: Since January 1, 2016, Bourré has been a delegated commune within the new commune of Montrichard Val de Cher.) ancient occupation is certain (villa and/or necropolis, possible temple)13,14,15; upstream from Pouillé, at Mareuil-sur-Cher, nineteenth-century authors attribute the remains of private baths to a large villa, perhaps accompanied by a necropolis, but the reliability of this information, which is old and poorly documented, is low.

== Timeline ==
=== A valley occupied since Mesolithic times ===
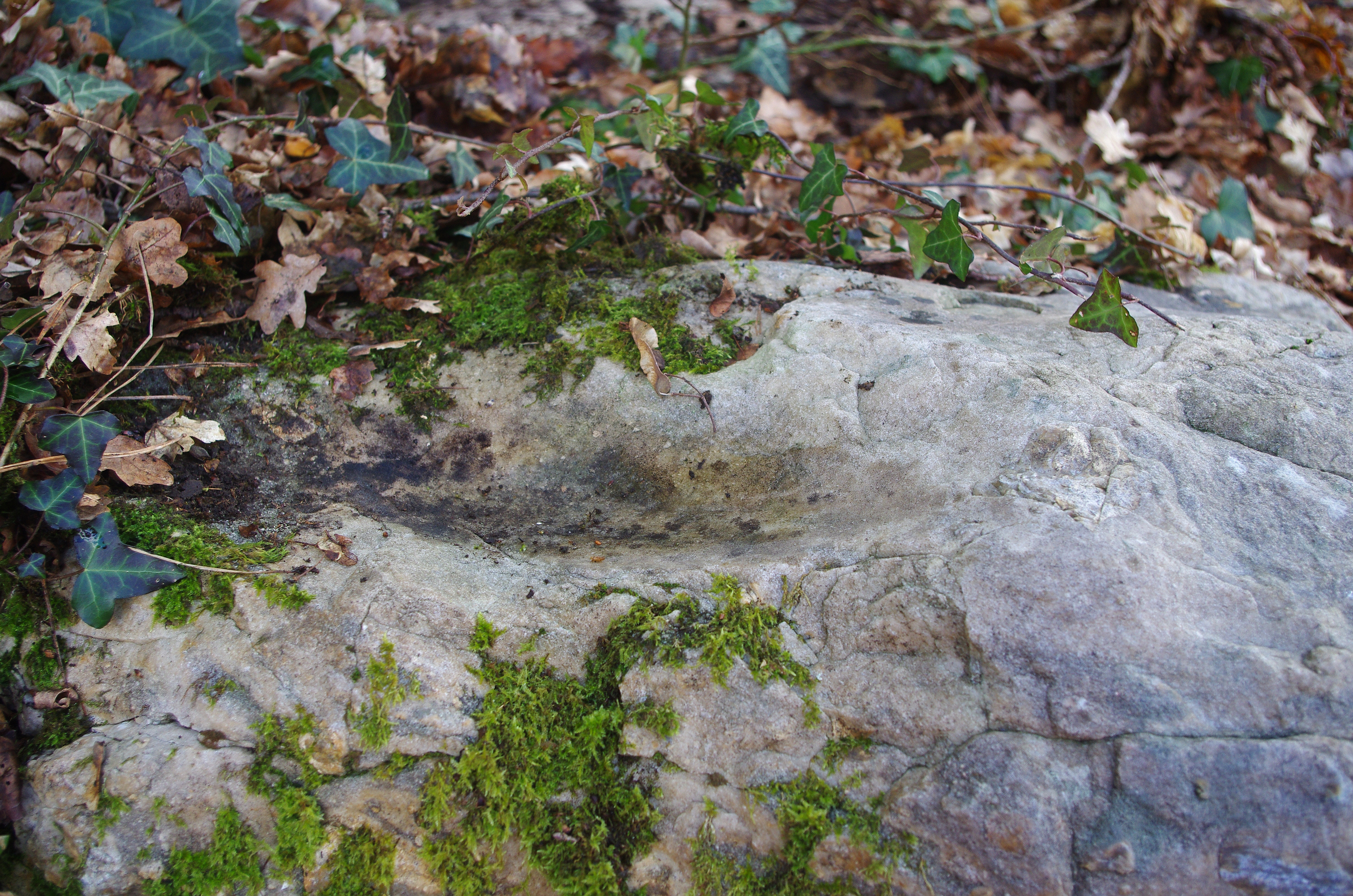
One of the Crémaillère polishing machines (Monthou-sur-Cher).

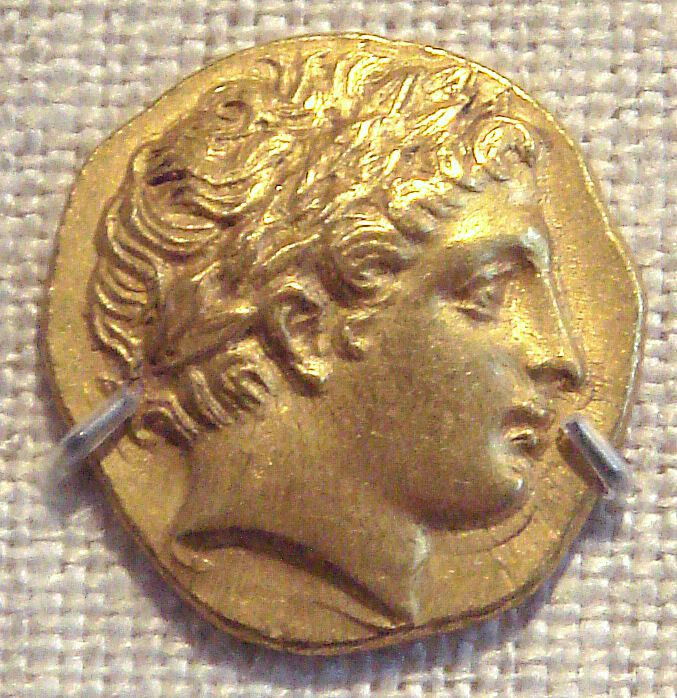
Statere of Philip II of Macedonia, the type used as a model for Gallic copies, including those found at Theseus.

Excavations at Les Mazelles have demonstrated Mesolithic occupation of the site, yielding several tools.

More broadly, Neolithic human occupation of the Cher valley is attested by reports of polissoirs, dolmens, menhirs and cromlechs at Monthou-sur-Cher, Pouillé and Thésée, but these testimonies all disappeared in the 21st century; it is not certain, however, that they all existed, as the reliability of some 19th-century sources is uncertain. The Crémaillère polishing works in Monthou-sur-Cher, on the other hand, have survived. Prior to the construction of the A85 freeway, preventive excavations on the borders of Thésée and Mareuil-sur-Cher revealed the existence of Neolithic settlements whose occupation continued into the Bronze Age.

Gold coins, imitations of Greek staters (in the commune of Thésée, but not located), and shards of ceramics or amphorae (on the Bordes site in Pouillé), can be dated to La Tène. On the left bank of the river, at Angé, west of Pouillé, a Gallic farmhouse has been identified.

=== The heyday of the High Roman Empire ===
The beginning of the Augustan period is poorly documented (a coin bearing the emperor's effigy has been found), but from the first decades of the 1st century, trade and crafts developed significantly and simultaneously across the entire site, although the relationships between the three main poles of occupation (Monthou, Pouillé, and Thésée) remain unclear. In the following century, the Pouillé industrial zone expanded and new buildings replaced the old ones, at the same time as the Mazelles buildings were erected. As no remains of public monuments have been found, it is not possible to locate the center of this settlement. Coins found on site (mainly in the Pouillé area) confirm that Tasciaca was at its height during this period: the oldest are dated to the Julio-Claudian period (27 B.C.-68 A.D.), and the most recent to the reign of Arcadius (395-408), found at Les Mazelles in a probable context of partial or temporary occupation of the buildings.

This period of intense activity at Tasciaca came to an end at the beginning of the 2nd century, as the small number of archaeological finds attributable to this period would seem to indicate. However, the site continued to be frequented by people representing a social elite, and was not completely abandoned; some people even minted their coins. However, it's not possible to say that all the settlements active during the High Kingdom are still inhabited. This general decline is probably a consequence of the period of instability experienced by the Roman Empire, but at Tasciaca, as at many other sites, there are insufficient sources to confirm this.

=== Focus on Theseus in the Middle Ages ===
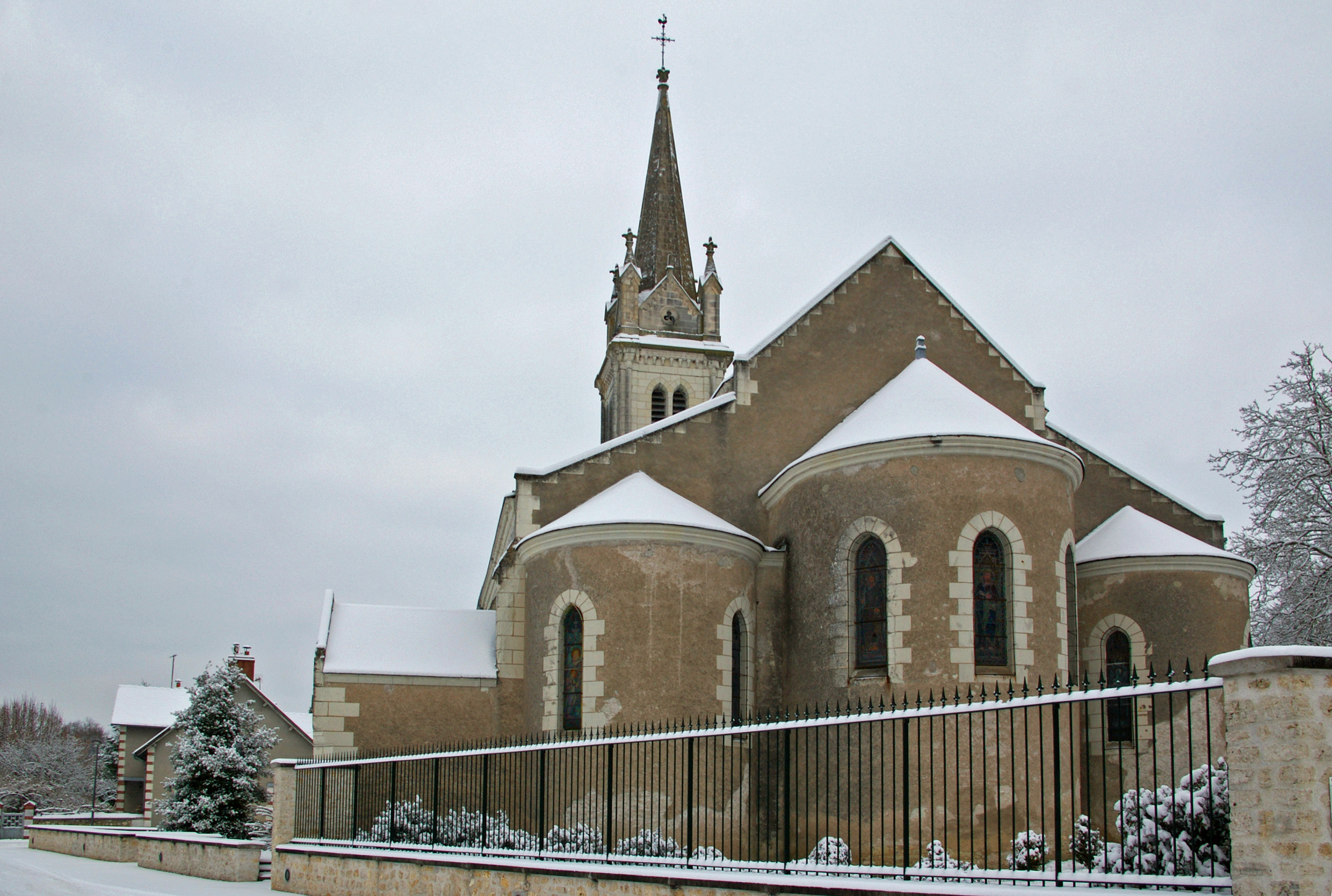

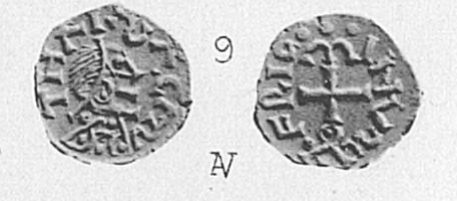
Merovingian coin of Theseus.

During the High Middle Ages, Tasciaca continued to be occupied, but only to the benefit of the town of Thésée. According to Jacqueline Cadalen-Lesieur, the Merovingian necropolis identified near Saint-Georges church, thanks to the presence of at least fourteen stone sarcophagi, seems to demonstrate this. A first church may have been built in the 10th century on the same site; a vanished chape, located a little to the north of the church, maybe older. Merovingian coins, probably locally minted (two triens are marked THAISACAS), have been found at Thésée. In the 10th century, Thésée was also the administrative center of a viguerie within the pagus Aurelianensis, which confirms the persistence of its administrative function.

From this time onwards, viticulture played an increasingly important role in the local economy, replacing manufacturing activities. The ancient sites of Pouillé (La Soler and Les Bordes) and the Mazelles area appear to have been deserted, as no mention is made of them in medieval sources; a burial site dating from the early Middle Ages was, however, found in one of the ancient buildings of Les Bordes. On the other hand, the Moulin du Ru is mentioned in the Monthou-sur-Cher priory's land register in the early 16th century.

=== Contemporary “Theseus” seeks to reconnect with its ancient past ===
In 1968, less than ten years after the first excavations revealed the richness of the local ancient heritage, the Thésée town council, at the suggestion of writer and politician Maurice Druon and supported by Jean Martin-Demézil, asked the Loir-et-Cher prefecture for authorization to rename the commune “Thésée-la-Romaine” (on the model of Vaison-la-Romaine) to “pay tribute” to its ancient past, replacing “Thézée”, the name then in force according to the official geographical code. In 1972, the prefecture refused to add the determinant “-la-Romaine”, justifying its refusal because this precedent could lead more than a thousand French communes to request a name change for the same reason. On the other hand, it accepts the substitution of the “s” for the “z”, more in keeping with the evolution of the ancient toponym. Nevertheless, the term Thésée-la-Romaine is still widely used in everyday language.

== Research, studies, and site enhancement ==
All the research carried out on the Tasciaca site up until the 21st century has been partial, limited to a specific sector of the site, and varied in terms of the objectives it set out to achieve and the investigative techniques used. What's more, the earliest of these were not always carried out with the scientific rigor that is essential today, particularly when it came to recording the archaeological context of the objects collected. This complicates the overall perception of the ancient settlement in terms of its spatial organization, history, and functions.

=== 18th and 19th centuries: first mentions and scholarly work ===
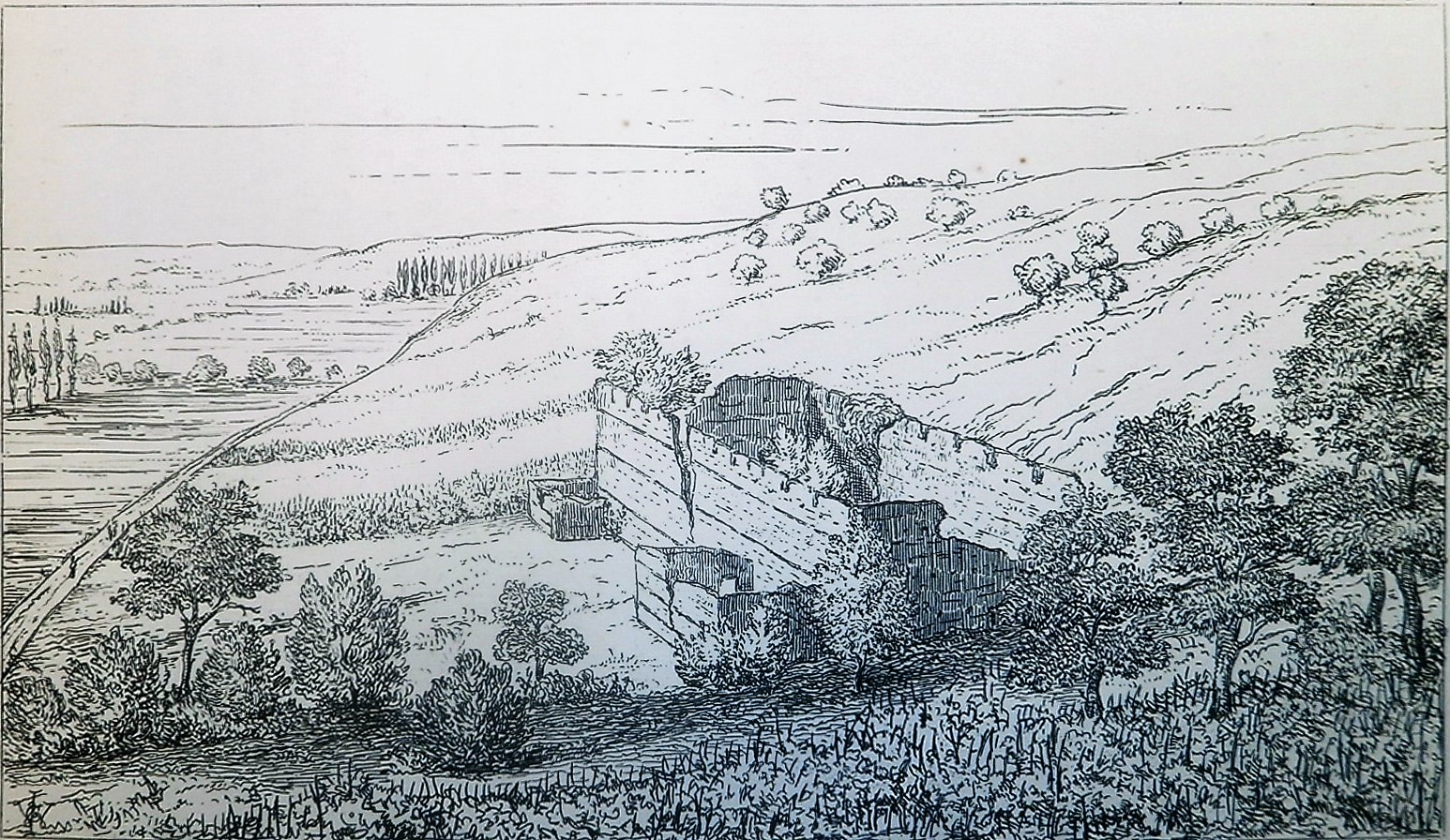
The Roman ruins of Les Mazelles, drawn by Charles Roach Smith in 185426.

As early as 1760, geographer Jean-Baptiste Bourguignon d'Anville saw the settlement of Thésée as the Tasciaca of the Peutinger table. The remains at Les Mazelles (the only ones known at the time) attracted the interest of French and foreign scholars such as Charles Roach Smith - who visited the Cher valley in June and July 1854 - from the mid-nineteenth century onwards, in a national context that was highly favorable to archaeology. (Note: Napoleon III's passion for ancient history (he was an avid reader of the Commentaries on the Gallic War and published an unfinished History of Julius Caesar) led many scholars to explore the remains and testimonies of Roman culture in France.) The ruins were included in the 18401 list of historic monuments. Investigations were carried out, plans of Les Mazelles were published and various hypotheses on the purpose of these buildings were formulated by Arcisse de Caumont and Louis de La Saussaye, and later by Albert Grenier. However, until the end of the 1950s, no systematic excavation was carried out on what was then known as the “Thésée site ”.

Furniture was collected on the left bank of the Cher during surface surveys; these finds, reported as early as 1842, did not lead to the clear identification of what was to become the site of the Pouillé kilns and temple. Similarly, research carried out at Monthou-sur-Cher (Moulin du Ru) in the 1830s by Louis de La Saussaye led to the identification of ancient structures whose function was not specified.

=== 20th century: gradual discovery of the site ===
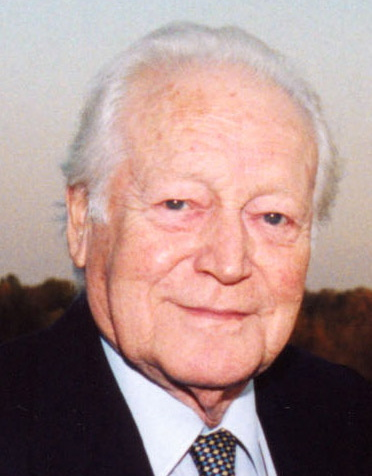
Maurice Druon.

In 1961, under the leadership of Georges Gaume, an engineer living in Thésée and supported by prehistorian André Högström, Les Mazelles was cleared of vegetation and the south-eastern buildings excavated. At the same time, the first structures were uncovered at Pouillé, on the left bank of the Cher, although they had been reported as early as 1842. In the autumn of 1965, Maurice Druon, who had discovered the site by chance, (Note: Driving through Thésée, Maurice Druon was struck by the coincidence between the mythological evocation of the commune's name and the presence of the Mazelles ruins.) bought the Mazelles plots to protect them from the risks of property speculation and to clear them of the recent buildings that were cluttering them up, so that archaeologists could carry out investigations; he sold them ten years later to the Loir-et-Cher General Council for the symbolic franc. In 1967, Maurice Druon was made an honorary citizen of Thésée. Excavations, led by Georges Gaume, continued until the early 1970s.

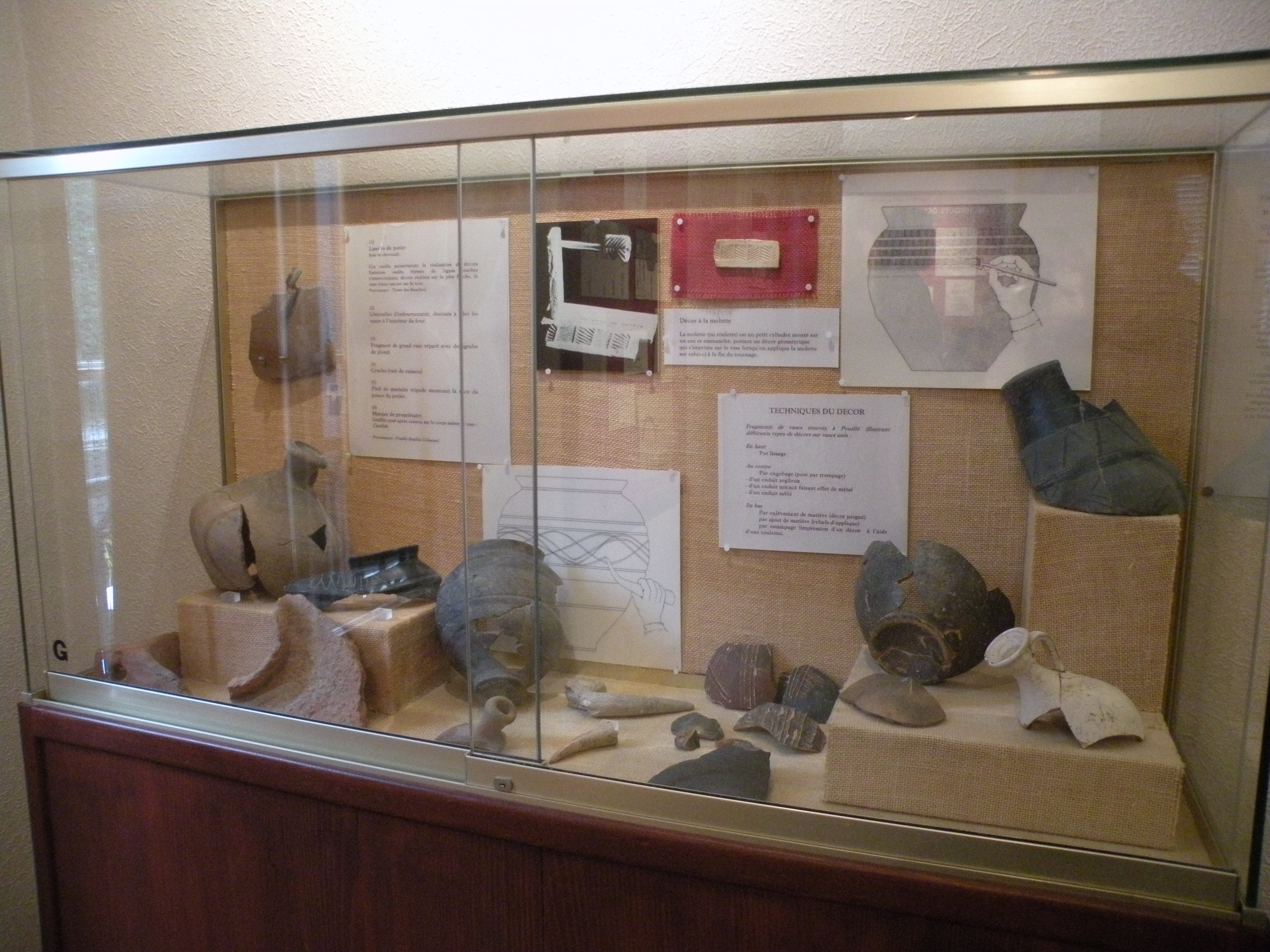
A display case at the Thésée archaeological museum in 2013.

In 1974, responsibility for the excavations was transferred to the Institut d'Art et d'Archéologie of the Université Paris-Sorbonne, under the direction of Claude Bourgeois, and the site became a training ground for students; excavations continued to the north, but above all to the south of the Cher, where the temple was cleared. From then on, publications referred to the “Thésée-Pouillé site”. These excavation programs were accompanied by surveys aimed at collecting and characterizing surface furniture. In the winter of 1982-1983, an exhibition at the Château de Blois was devoted to Tasciaca and the studies carried out there. The exhibition catalog accurately inventoried the results of the excavations and studies carried out at Tasciaca up to that point. This concrete example serves as the basis for a description and analysis of the working methods applicable to an excavation site, and the work is still a reference on the subject. Excavations ceased in 1983, a year after Georges Gaume's death.

Between 1985 and 1987, the Thésée Archaeological Museum was opened on the second floor of the town hall building, showcasing numerous artifacts from the excavations and retracing the site's history; in 2002, it was awarded the title of “Musée de France”. A summary of our knowledge was published in 1999 in a special issue of the Revue archéologique du Centre de la France. From then on, there were no significant advances in our understanding of the Tasciaca site until the beginning of the 21st century.

=== 21st century: collective interdisciplinary research program ===
A new research program, begun in 2003 and completed in 2007, combines documentary studies (bibliography and IGN aerial photo archives), aerial and ground surveys, and studies of furniture and buildings. The results suggest that the Tasciaca site extends over 2.5 km along the Cher, in three communes, justifying the name “site of Thésée-Pouillé-Monthou-sur-Cher”. This program has also enabled us to gain a better understanding of the activities carried out in the secondary urban area, although we have not yet made any progress on certain points, such as the actual purpose of the Mazelles complex. The program was initially intended to accompany the restructuring of the Musée de Thésée but was ultimately abandoned. The conclusions of this study were published in 2016 in a copious chapter in the 64th issue of the Revue archéologique du Centre de la France.

=== Enhancement ===
In the 21st century, the various elements of the site uncovered by successive excavations have been unevenly showcased. At Thésée, the Mazelles complex, the only part of the site classified as a historic monument and owned by the Loir-et-Cher departmental council (CD 41), is protected by a fence; lecterns describe and explain the architecture of the buildings and, in summer, guided tours are organized. The area is also landscaped. In Pouillé, the entire Les Bordes area, including the remains of the fanum, is also the property of CD 41 and is in a protected archaeological zone. The masonry of the temple has been consolidated with mortar, and the entire site has been enclosed to prevent damage. After being studied, the furnaces were reburied to protect them (from climatic aggression, flooding of the Cher, and “archaeological” vandalism), but a furnace was rebuilt nearby, offering as faithful a reconstruction as possible. It was soon damaged. The remains of the large buildings, the well, and the basin were left untouched after excavation. While the well remains well preserved, the remains of the large buildings tend to disappear under the earth and vegetation, and those of the basin have become difficult to discern.

The oldest elements of the Tasciaca site at Monthou-sur-Cher are no longer visible, and those identified by recent studies have not been uncovered.

A museum devoted entirely to the Tasciaca site has been set up on the second floor of the Thésée town hall. It displays some of the material collected during excavations at Thésée and Pouillé, reconstructions of buildings and fittings, and explanatory panels on the history of the site. A project to relocate the museum, led by the association des amis du musée et du site de Tasciaca and project managed by the Conseil départemental, is being studied in 2018 to facilitate visitor access and improve museography.

== Ancient site layout ==
Tasciaca's site, known in 2016, is located in a strip more than 2.5 km long on the right bank of the Cher, in the valley between the river and the hillside, between Thésée to the east (le Grand Cimetière and le Bourg, les Mazelles) and Monthou-sur-Cher to the west (le Moulin du Ru). Opposite Thésée, on the left bank of the Cher, in the commune of Pouillé, another area of occupation is identified in the river's major bed (lieux-dits de la Soler and des Bordes).

Known extent of the Tasciaca site plotted on a modern map.

=== Communication routes ===
==== The waterway, the Cher river crossing, and riverbank improvements ====
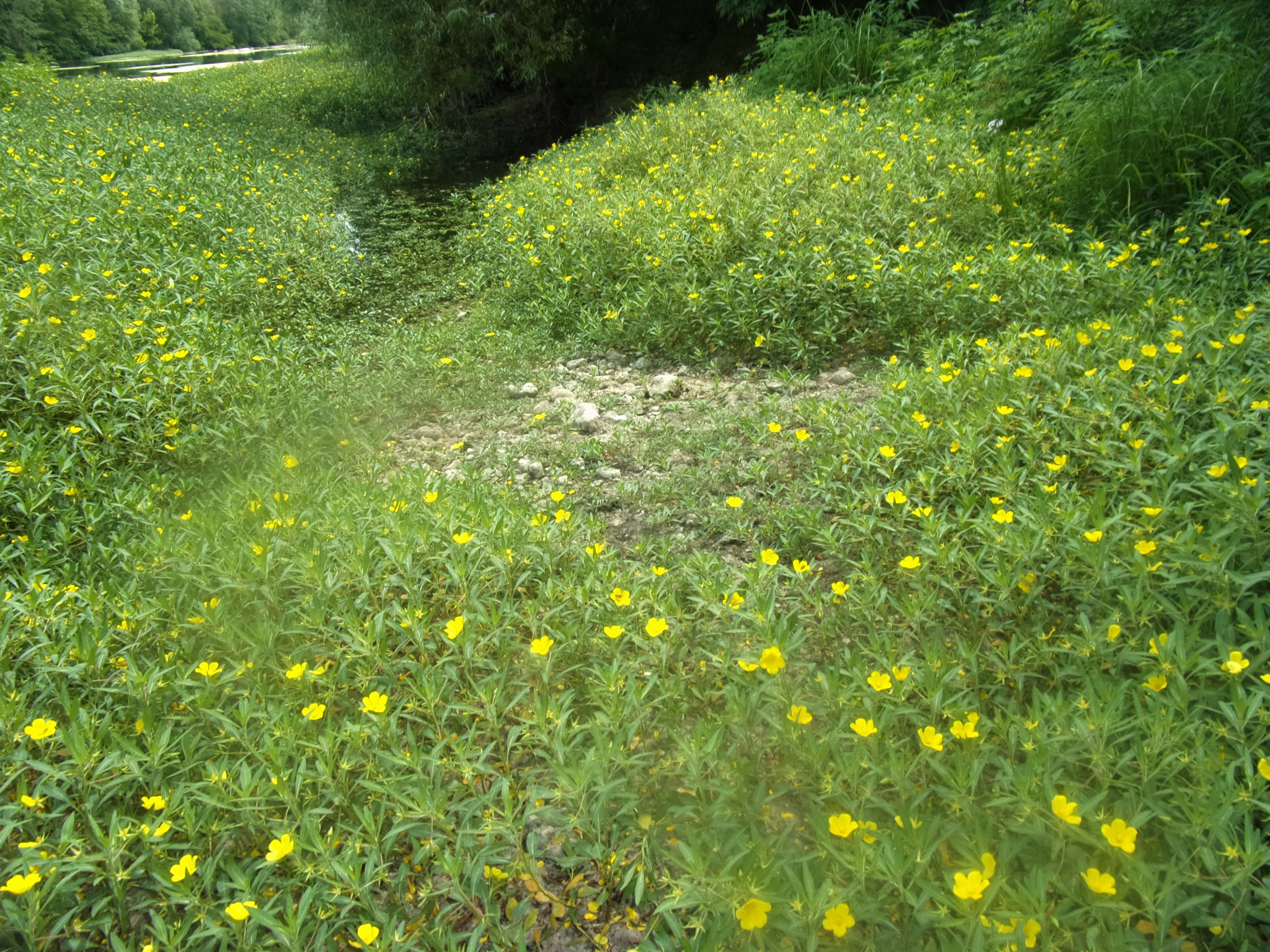
Remains of a potential ford on the left bank of the Cher.

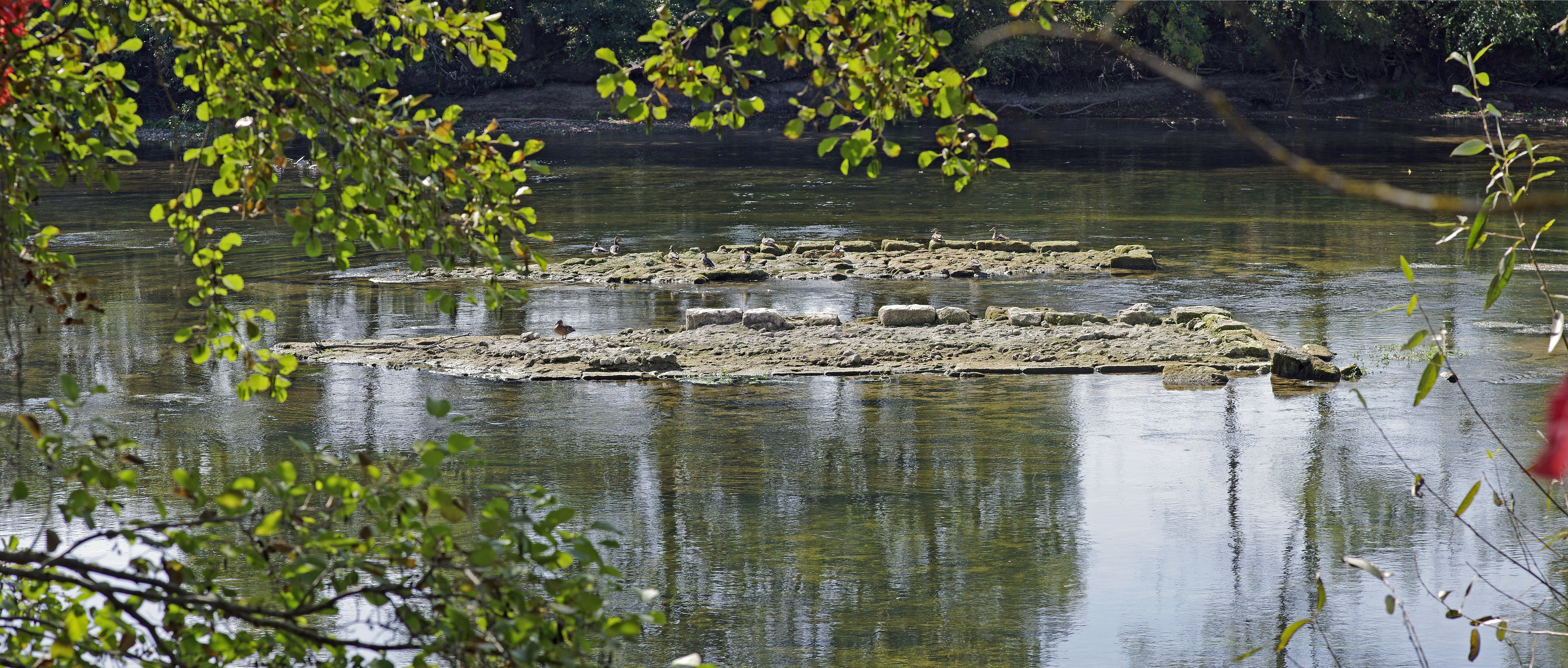
Piles from the medieval mill at Thésée.

In ancient times, the Cher was probably navigable from Vierzon to Tours; remains of monoxide dugout canoes have been found at several upstream sites, but this type of evidence is lacking in the area around Tasciaca. The course of the river does not appear to have changed significantly since Antiquity.

The existence of a Cher river crossing (bridge or ford) in the Tasciaca sector is a hypothesis based on the need to connect the sites occupied by either bank. The two piers of a former medieval mill in the bed of the Cher appear to reuse older structures that could be those of an ancient bridge (masonry piers, wooden deck), but this remains a hypothesis in the current state of knowledge. In addition, it is not possible to confirm the antiquity of fords that have been identified based on remains or because traces of them have been preserved in place names.

At a shallow depth in the bed of the Cher, near the right bank downstream of Les Mazelles, remains similar to a cobbled quay have been identified over a length of some thirty meters. A similar structure has been identified to the west of the potters' workshops on the left bank (Pouillé), towards which an ancient road leads; here again, there is no certainty as to its function.

==== The Bourges-Tours overland route ====
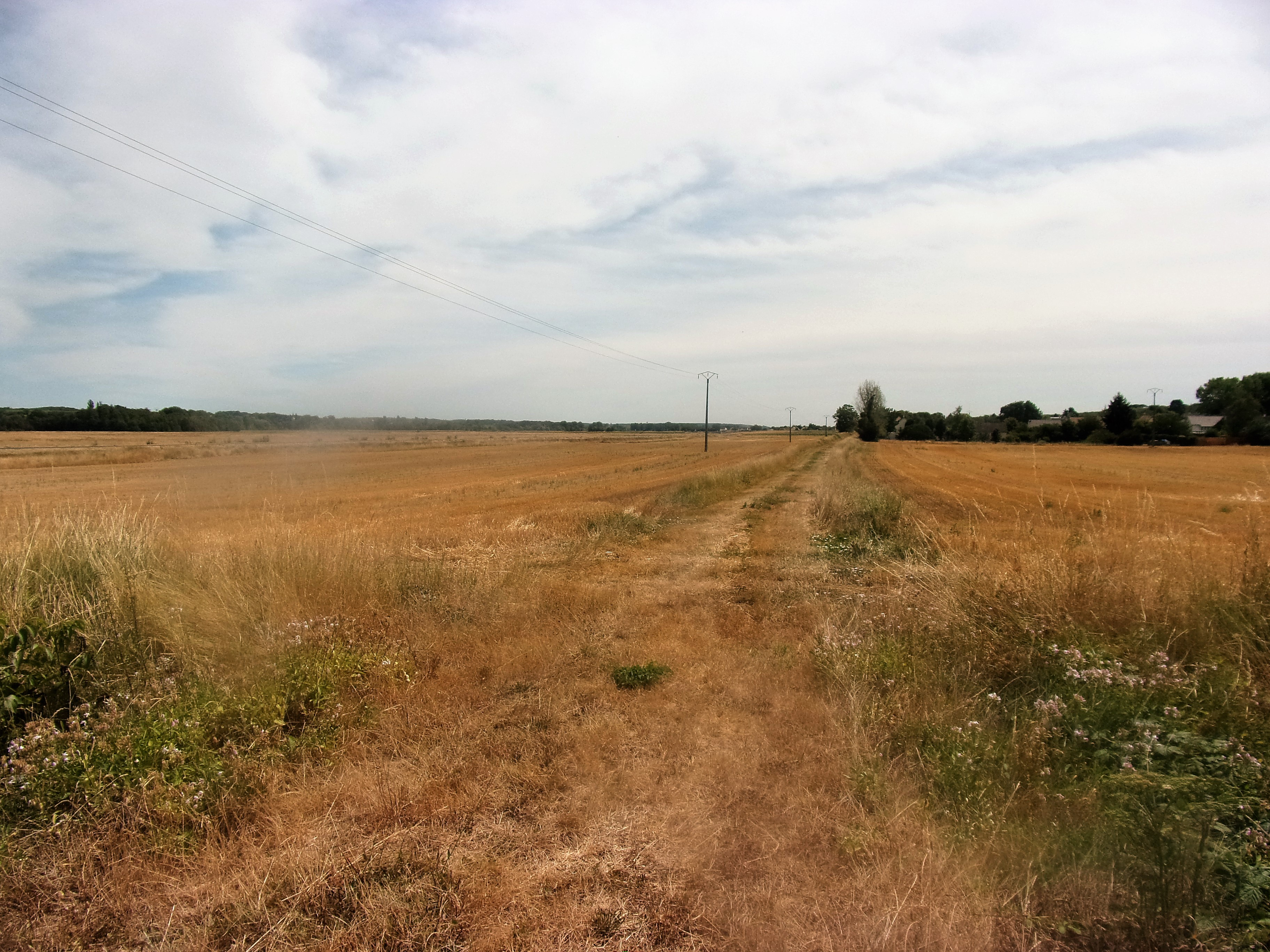
Old road from Montrichard to Pouillé.

The ancient Bourges-Tours road, mentioned on the Peutinger table, has not been formally identified on the right bank of the Cher at the site, although it is attested in other nearby places (Chisseaux or Nohant-en-Graçay). In 1854, Charles Roach Smith believed it to be “completely covered by the main road between Tours and Bourges”. However, observations gathered in the 2000s (aerial views, electrical prospecting) suggest that an undated track runs along the Cher on its right bank, between the river and the railway line; it is located at Les Mazelles (a dense layer of pebbles resting on yellow sand, bounded on one side by stones) and further west, at the Moulin du Ru site (fossil traces on photographic images); electrical prospecting reveals a linear structure between these two points and in their extension. Another route, again on the right bank, certainly runs along the crest of the plateau, sheltered from flooding; parallel traces over a 2 km length could be a vestige of this. On the left bank, an ancient path, parallel to the Cher, most probably runs between the D976 to the north and the D17 to the south; this route was mentioned as early as the 19th century. It too is probably doubled by a path on the plateau, passing to the south of the village of Pouillé.

This set of observations suggests that the single route shown on the Peutinger table covers many routes in the field: the main route, usable in all seasons, would follow the crest of the hillside on the right bank; in the valley, outside flood periods, it would be possible to take either a right bank path or a left bank path, the latter seemingly intended more specifically to serve the artisan workshops of Pouillé.

==== Other land routes ====
The secondary roads serving the Tasciaca settlement are almost unknown. Running south-west-north-east, roughly parallel to each other and towards the Cher, only two roads have been identified at Pouillé, in the area of the kilns they seem to serve; the westernmost runs along the fanum to the west. These roads, which appear to be secondary, seem to structure this sector well, and all the buildings identified, except the temple, are aligned with them; they do not, however, link up with a larger network. To the north, on the Cher side, they appear to lead to one of the structures identified as a possible quay or riverbank development.

=== The Mazelles complex ===
==== Description ====
Map of the Mazelles site (dotted line shows structures attested but not uncovered)C 35.

The origin of the name Mazelles can be traced back to the evolution of the Latin name maceriae, translatable as “ruins ”.

This large complex is located on the right bank of the Cher, more than 500 m west of the last houses of the modern village of Thésée; the site occupies the southern end of a thalweg that cuts through the plateau and descends towards the Chervalley. The archaeological data available in the 21st century show a complex of four buildings (two of which are adjoining and may be considered as a single structure) with a total built-up area of 1,400 m^{2} within an area of 2.6 ha, probably enclosed by a wall of which only part has been preserved. This complex is listed as a historic monument on the 1840 list.

==== Large north building ====
Plan of the large north building.

The largest of the buildings, to the north, measures over 48 m in length and almost 20 m in width after extension, with 5.50 m of the wall elevation locally preserved. It comprises a vast, unpartitioned hall flanked by a gallery to the south, accompanied by two pavilions (40 x 19.40 m for all these constructions). There are three doorways (west, east, and south) and 27 windows, mostly at the top of the walls. The location of these windows, at a height of 4.70 m, probably just under the roof structure, is difficult to explain. An undated extension (8.50 x 14.70 m) was added to the east of the building. The new construction is visible on the north wall, on the exterior side: no projection at the base of the wall, different layout of the terracotta beds.

The foundations of the walls rest directly on the limestone of the hillside, which is almost flush on the north and west sides, while they rest on the sands of ancient Cher river beds that line the eastern and southern ends of the thalweg. Composed of two facings of small-scale limestone rubble bonded with pink tuileau mortar and enclosing a block core, the walls measure a maximum of 0.80 m thick. In addition to small units, their architecture features tile beds and courses in which the rubble stones, made from the same rock, are less wide but longer, and assembled obliquely (opus spicatum). Tiles can also be found in round arches, quoins, or at the top of a row of bolt holes. The circulation floor of this building was uncovered in the largest room during excavations carried out in 1965, the report of which is unpublished; it consists of two beds of small pebbles bonded with mortar. Nothing has been found of its roof structure, but a wooden truss structure, even on a span of this size, is technically feasible. In the nineteenth century, the hypothesis of a partial roof with a compluvium in the center of the largest room was even considered.

Les Mazelles, large north building.

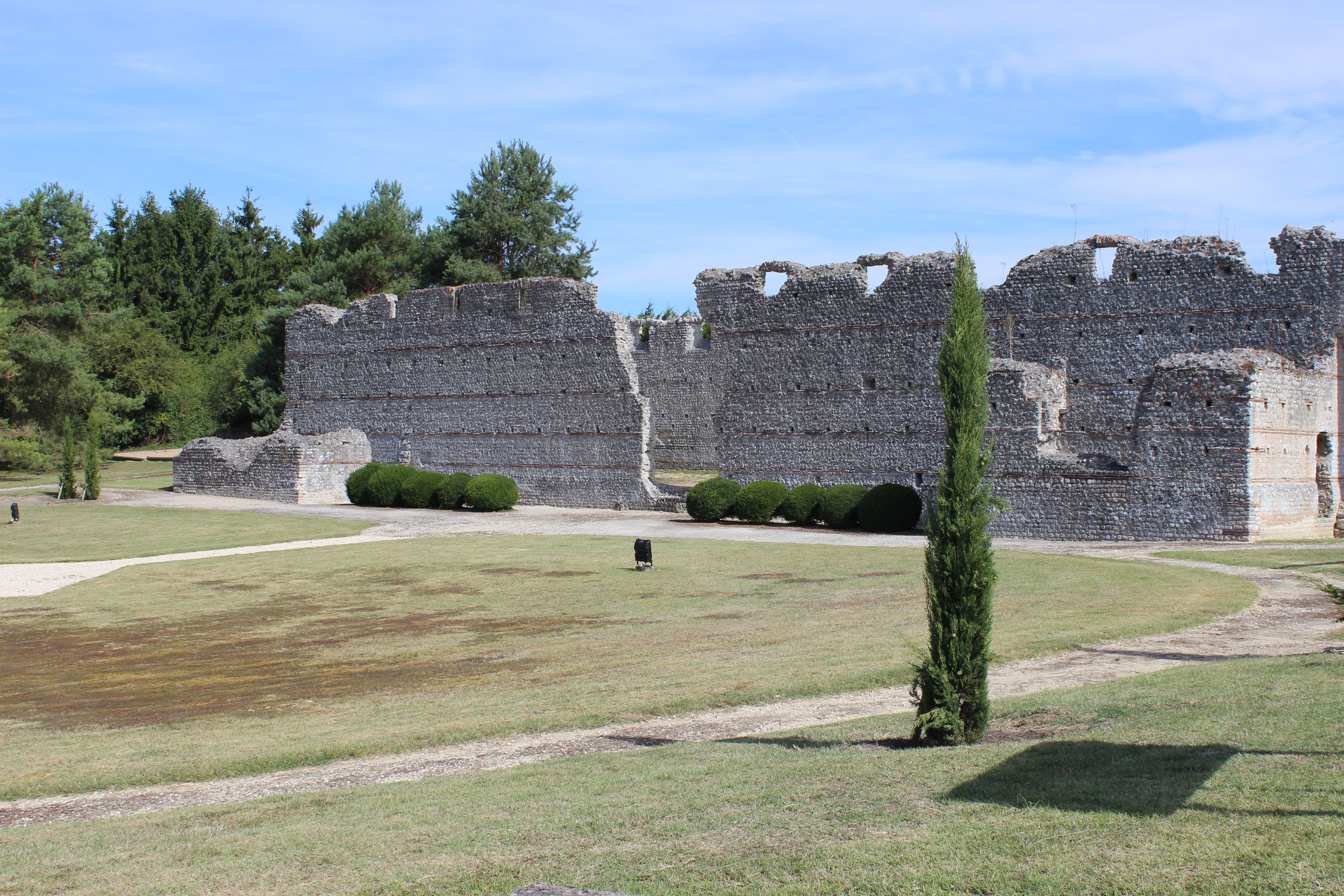
General view.

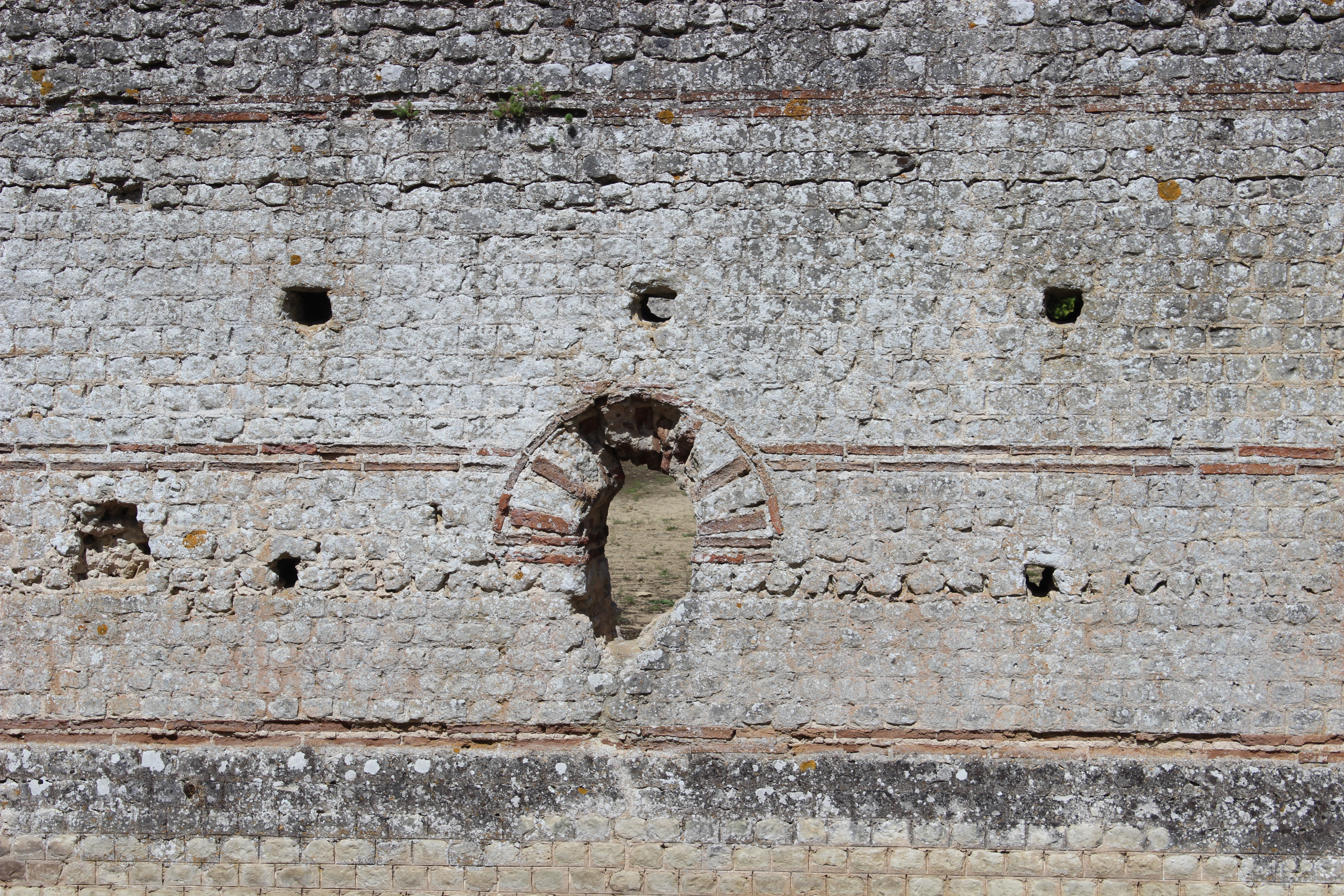
Detail of the architectural device (terracotta bed and opus spicatum).

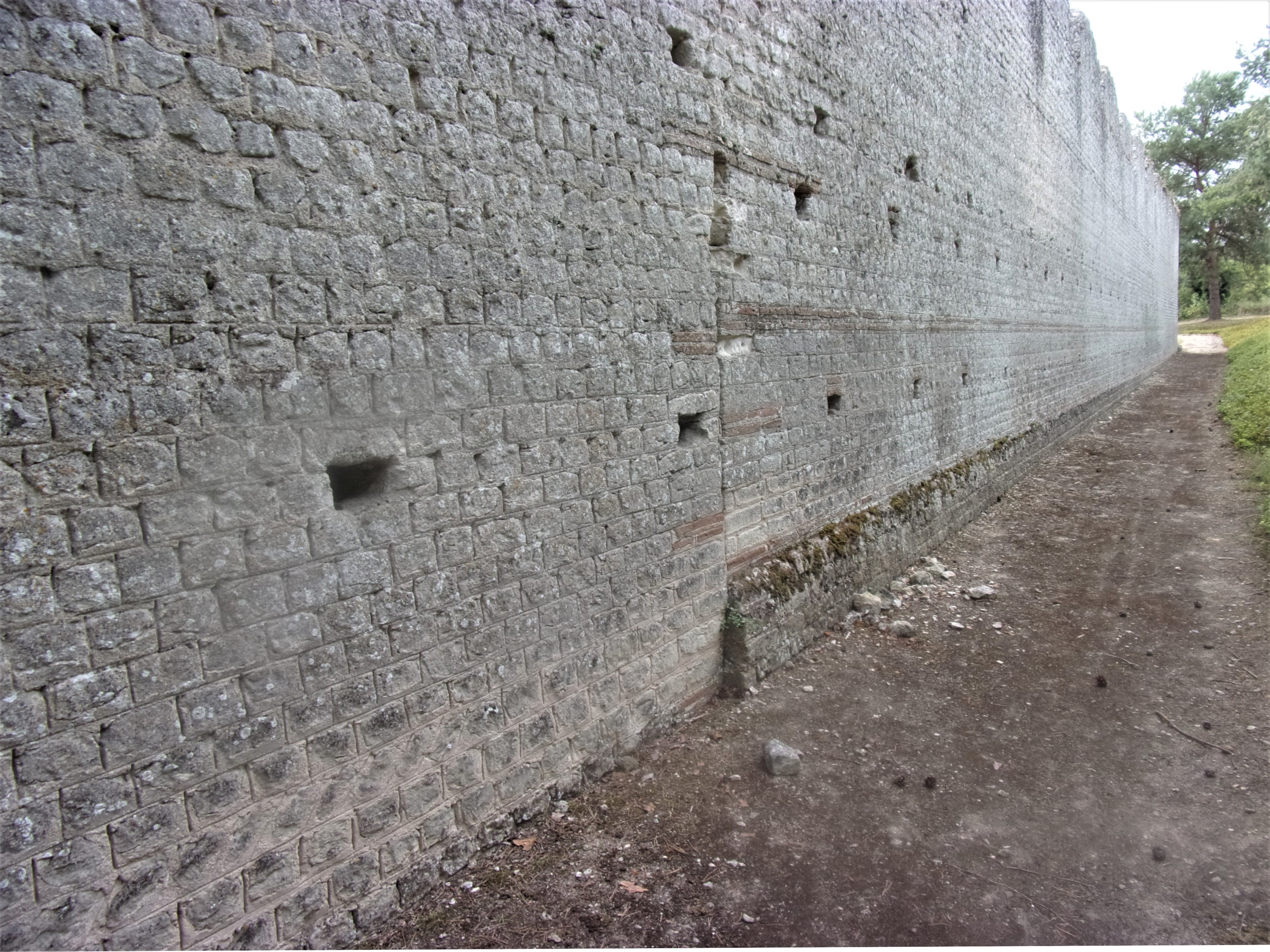
Rebuilding the north wall on the outside.

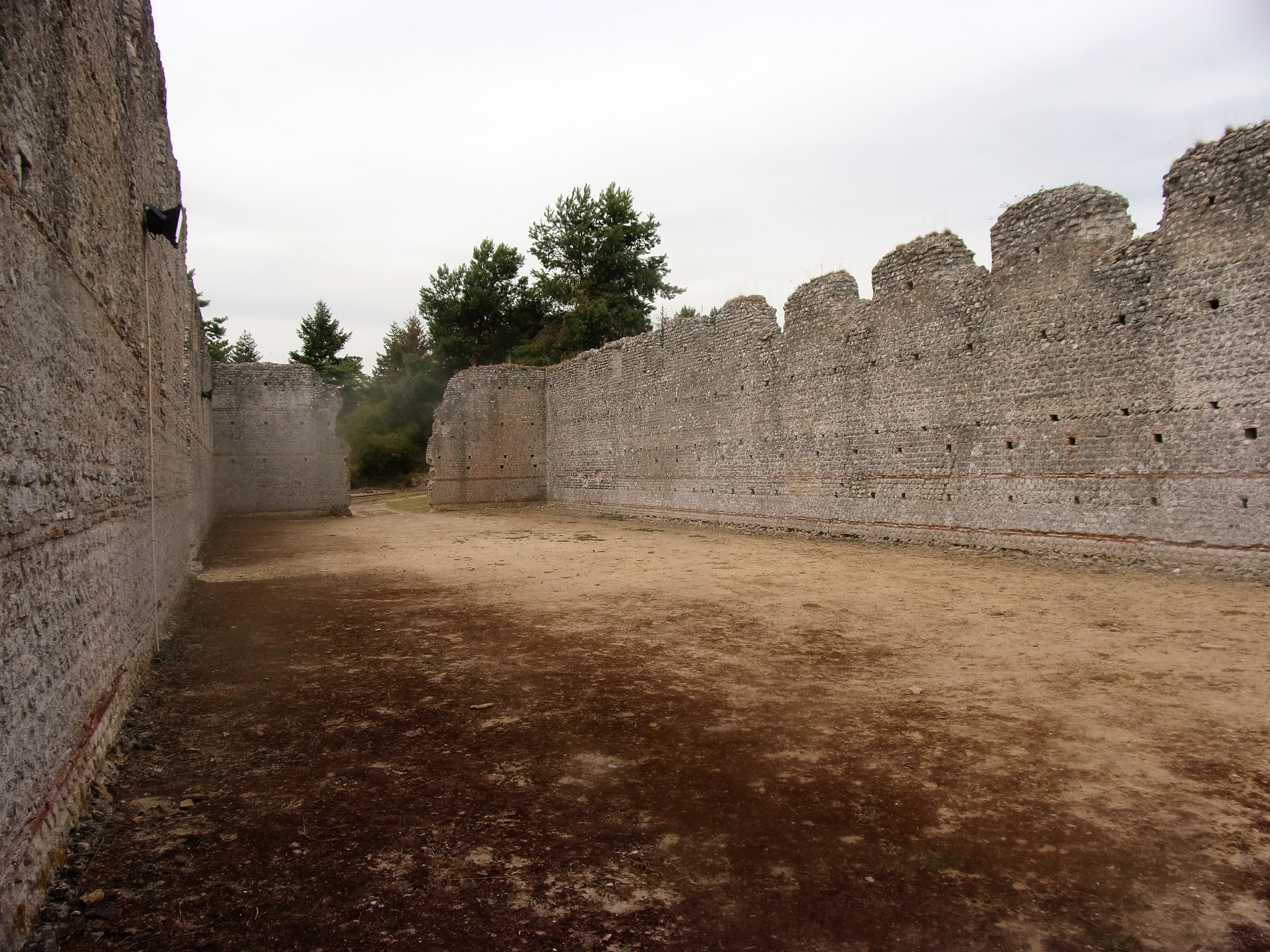
Interior view.

==== Other site amenities ====
The other two buildings are located in the southern part of the site; they are built according to the same architectural principle, but their walls are slightly thinner than those of the northern building (0.50 m). The southwest building, consisting of a single room, measures 11.50 × 9.60 m; its walls, leveled at the third elevation, may have provided an entrance to the west. The southeast building, measuring 30.60 × 17.80 m, is composed of two juxtaposed structures. The north building, like the large Mazelles building, has two square rooms on its west side, probably linked by a gallery.

The layout of the site's perimeter wall is only partially recognized: its long western side measures 82 m in length and is pierced by a 3.16 m-wide doorway with a vestibule shape protruding into the courtyard. From the northwest corner of this wall, the north side is preserved for 18 m towards the large Mazelles building. On the south side, it is attested but not visible for several dozen meters under the D176 right-of-way, as well as on the east side, to the right of the large building.

Excavations and surveys carried out in the enclosure and buildings of Les Mazelles reveal the paucity of archaeological material, varied in composition but quantitatively very small. There are several reasons for this: precise observations are only partial; Les Mazelles has been subject to looting; when the site was cleared in the mid-1960s, at a time when it was occupied by crops (gardens, vines, orchards, etc.), a large quantity of earth was removed without observation, the only requirement being to stop stripping when masonry appeared, which certainly led to the destruction of a great deal of archaeological material.

Les Mazelles, small buildings and enclosure.

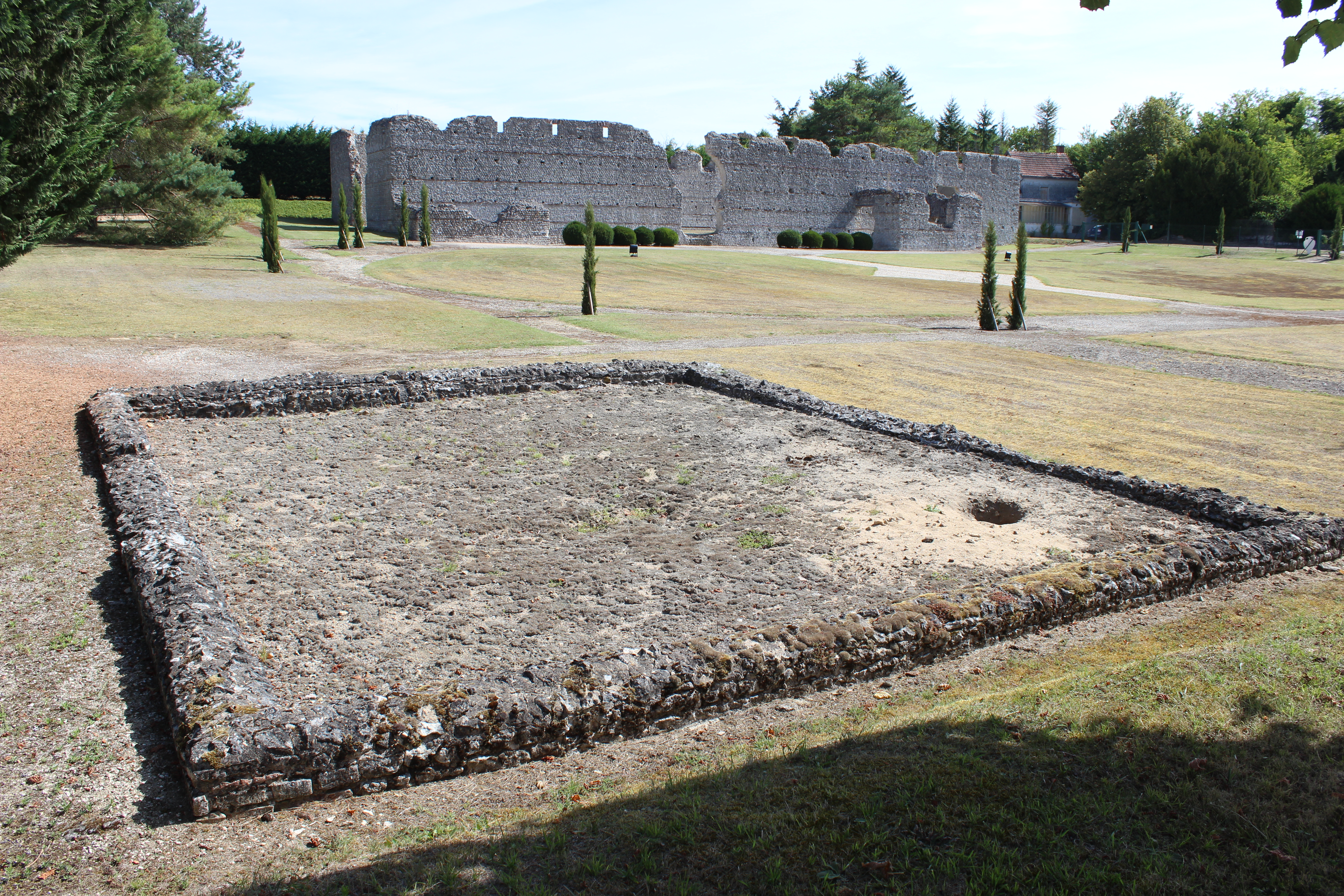
Southwest building.

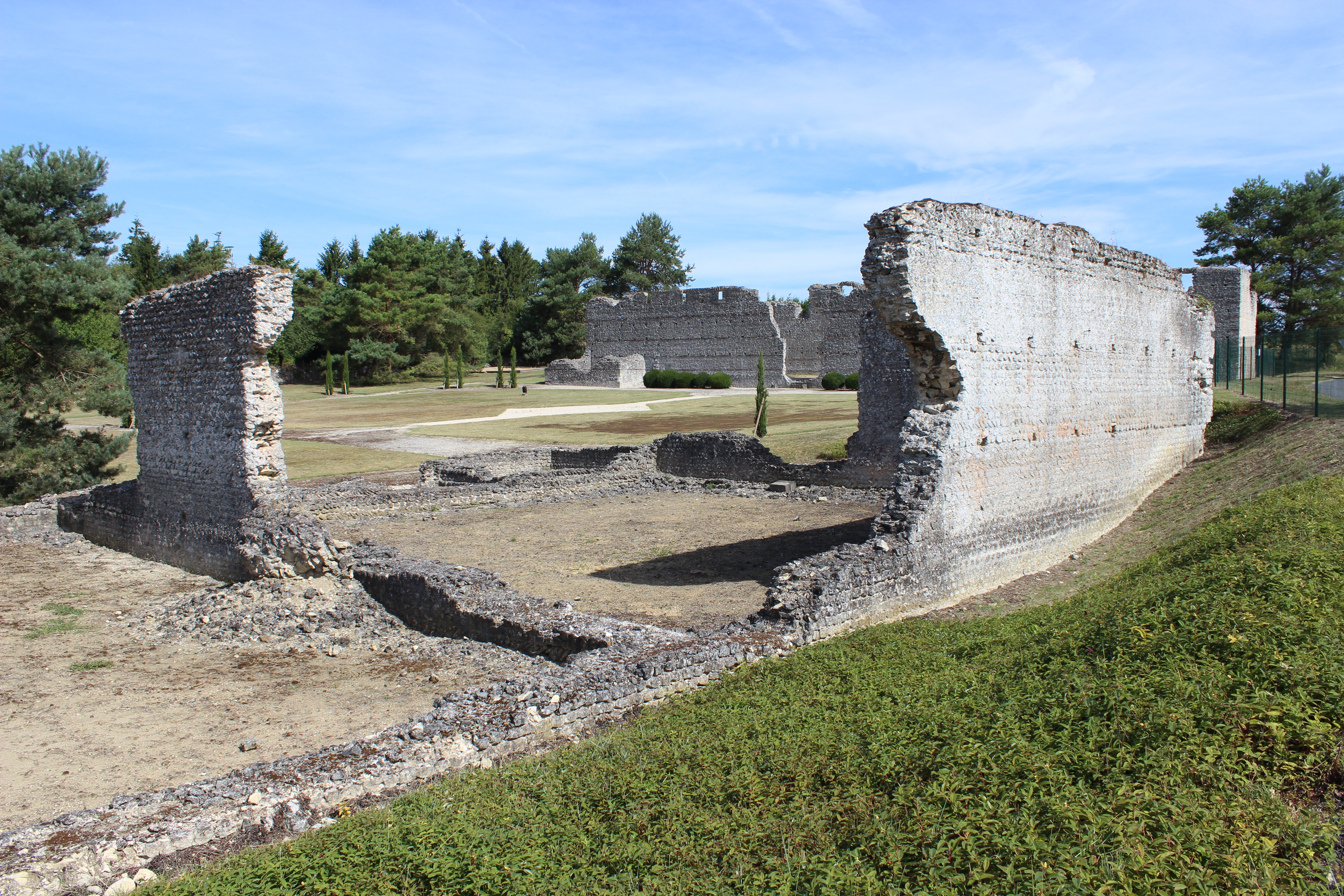
South-east building.

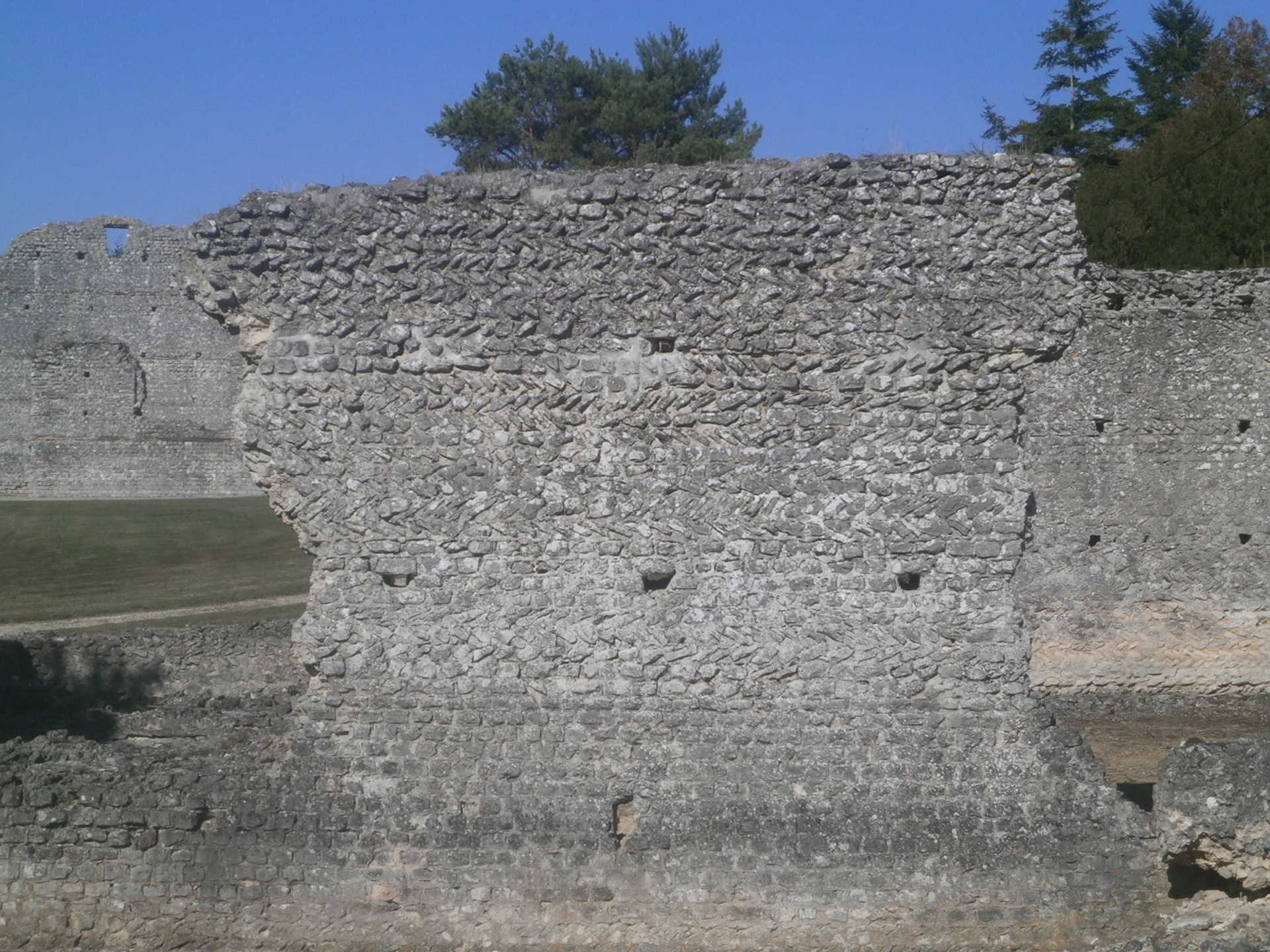
South-east building, close-up view.

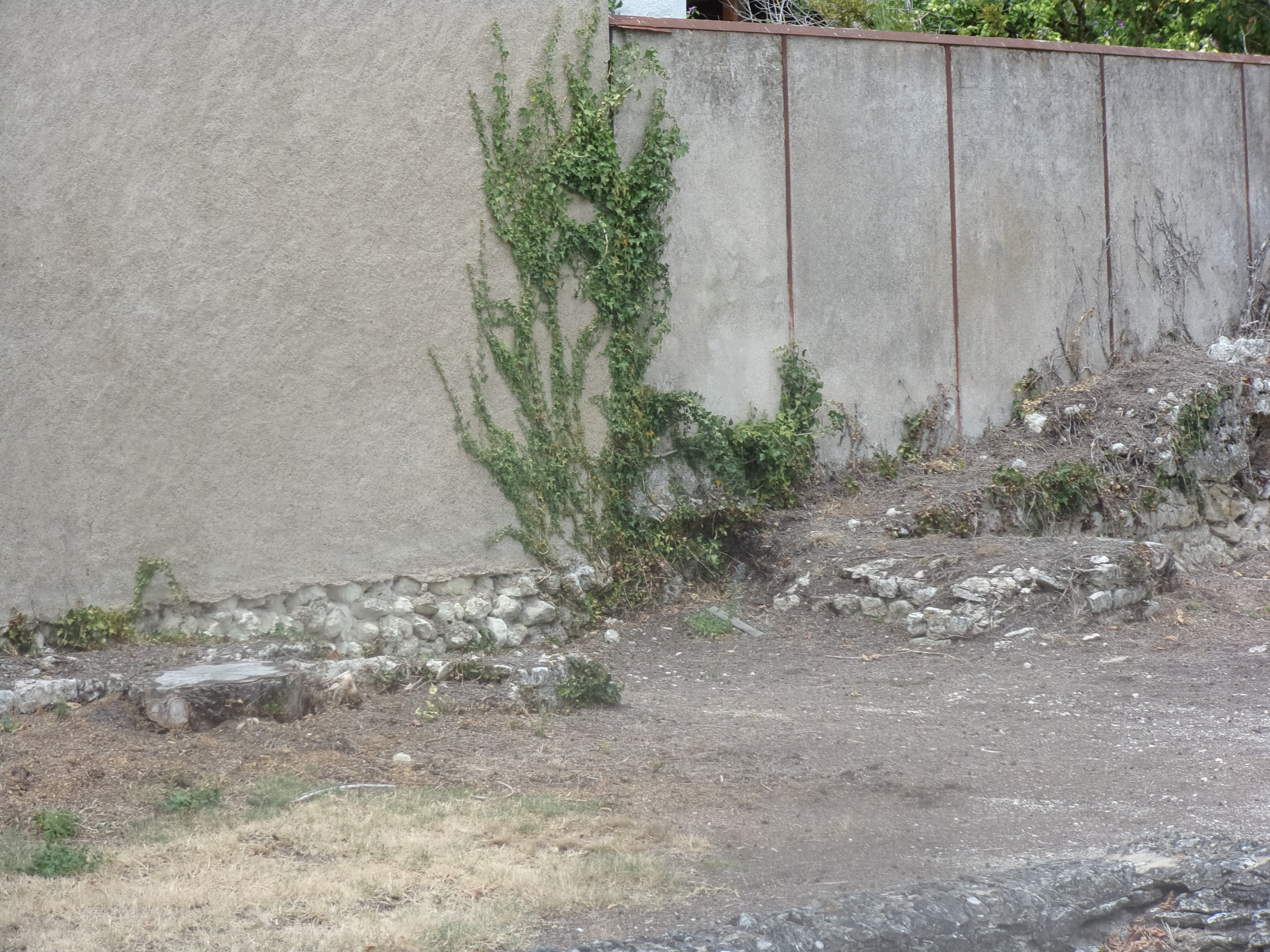
West entrance to the enclosure.

==== Dating and chronology ====
Very little archaeological material was found on the site, just a few shards of pottery or tiles and a few rare coins, making it more difficult to date the complex. For the same reason, and because the architecture of the buildings raises questions that remain unanswered for the time being (type of roofing, for example), it has even been suggested - which seems less and less plausible - that the construction site, which took place in several stages, may have been abandoned prematurely. Under these conditions, the dating of Les Mazelles is based on fragile hypotheses linked to the architectural style; however, it is argued - and recently discovered evidence supports this hypothesis - that construction may have begun as early as the beginning of the first century, and accelerated significantly during Hadrian's reign, as part of a vast building program in the Gauls desired by the emperor. A later dating had initially been proposed, when scholars believed that the inclusion of terracotta beds in masonry only appeared during the Late Roman Empire.

The limestone rubble used in the construction of the large north building and the southeast buildings appears to have been extracted from a quarry some 800 m to the northeast of the site. Samples taken from the south-west building indicate that the stone was probably extracted from a different area in the same quarry, and suggest that this building is older than the others. Several types of bonding mortar were also identified, making it possible to establish the existence of several stages in the construction of the complex, as well as to establish a relative chronology of these construction phases. Four successive construction phases can thus be distinguished, without it being possible to establish precise start and end dates or to assess the length of the interval separating each phase, even if stage 3 may have succeeded stage 2 within a very short space of time

1. construction of the south-west building;
2. erection of the large north building (before the extension) and the start of construction of the southeast building;
3. enlargement of the north building and extension of the southeast building;
4. Construction of the perimeter wall.
Phase 1.

Phase 2.

Phase 3.

Phase 4.

=== Functions ===
The purpose of this complex is uncertain. It has sometimes been assimilated into a villa, with the large northern building constituting the residential part or pars urbana (difficult to conceive in the absence of partitioning of the building and due to the high position of the windows), to a castrum (unlikely due to the thinness of the walls) or a civil basilica. Another possibility is that the Mazelles site was a wine cellar, whose layout seems similar to that of similar buildings in Sainte-Colombe, Cognac or Port-des-Barques, or even in the Rhineland, and whose function is well attested, but there is no evidence (furniture, fittings) to corroborate this hypothesis even though winegrowing is attested in this area in ancient times. An administrative function, such as a building for receiving and depositing annone, cannot be ruled out either.

The most likely hypothesis, however, is that of an establishment linked to traffic and commerce on the Bourges-Tours route (perhaps a mansio) or to river traffic on the Cher; in this hypothesis, the main building would constitute a warehouse or a public building with multiple functions, the smaller structures being either service buildings such as stables, or guesthouses providing accommodation for travelers.

=== The sanctuary ===
==== Fanum ====
S1: primitive sanctuary A C: cella P: peribola V: undefined building remains Ca: antique road I: lapidary inscription

Restitution of the dedication inscription found in the temple:
Element 1:

CAES

MPII

Element 2 (assembly of 10 different fragments):

AVG . GER

AE . FLUME

V . S . L . M.EX

DI . VITAE

NIS. PERICVL

VS. VIRTICOMBO

WIRE

A small fanum was discovered in 1975 in the southern part of the site, on the left bank of the Cher. Bordered to the north-west by an ancient road (Ca) leading to the Cher, it takes the form of a square cella (C) measuring 6.45 m on each side, probably without a peripheral gallery. Its walls, 0.50 m thick, are lined with regular small-scale limestone on the outside, facing a block of mortar-bonded flint and limestone chips; a door opens to the southeast. This cella, flanked to the north by another structure (A) (perhaps an altar or an offering table) and to the west by another highly degraded aedicula (V), forms part of a peribola (P) whose irregular shape seems to have been dictated by the presence of the road that runs alongside the temple to the west; the construction of the wall of this peribola, whose entrance is probably to the northeast, is much less meticulous than that of the sanctuary itself. The presence of altars outside the temple is frequently reported.

A lapidary inscription (I), found in 1974 in the southeast corner of the cella of this sanctuary, maybe a dedication to a Roman emperor, Domitian or Trajan. According to the reconstruction and interpretation, a person bearing a Latin name (ending in “...VS”) would thank the emperor on behalf of his father, whose name would be Gallic (“VIRTICOMBO”) and who would have escaped danger from the river, the word flume possibly being a reference to the Cher.

A few fragments of painted plaster, attributable to the outer covering of the temple walls, were found near the monument. They are white, pink, or red, except one where a black line separates a white part from an ochre-red part.

A square construction (dry-stone walls and wooden posts at the corners), possibly the first stage of the sanctuary (S1), was found under the fanum cella; leveled, it was buried under fill when the cella was built. The following chronology can be proposed for the construction of this sanctuary, based on the nature of the stones and the composition of the mortar used in the masonry

1. construction of the primitive sanctuary;
2. construction of the cella of the Gallo-Roman fanum, centered on the original sanctuary and enclosing it;
3. creation of a circulation floor around the cella;
4. construction of the peribolus wall;
5. construction of the altar against the north wall of the cella.

Phases 2 to 4 may have been built in quick succession during the second quarter of the 1st century, and the fifth phase is potentially contemporary with the construction of the large Mazelles building, as shown by the study of the rubble making up the altar. It appears to have been abandoned in the late 1st or early 2nd century.

Bones found in the sanctuary are likely to have been deposited for votive purposes. The skeleton of a butchered dog dates from the period of the sanctuary preceding the fanum; the sacred sacrifice of this animal seems to have been a fairly widespread practice. More than 1,600 bone fragments, most of them unidentifiable, but including bovine bones, are deposited at the entrance to the Gallo-Roman temple, exposed to the trampling of worshippers using this passageway.

==== Other fittings ====
On the other side of a modern road, some thirty meters south-southwest of the temple stands a basin measuring 6.00 × 4.75 m; two niches cut into the thickness of its walls and its small capacity - so its water probably had no utilitarian function - suggest that it could be linked to the fanum, with which it would constitute, according to Claude Bourgeois, a “healing water” sanctuary. The means used to fill it are not known; in the absence of a recognized spring in the vicinity, it was probably filled with water drawn from a well and its water carefully collected in a sump dug at one of its corners. It may have been converted into a dwelling at a later date, with the addition of a door in its northeast corner.

A circular well with a diameter of around 0.80 m was dug some 30 m to the northeast of the fanum. Just over 4 m deep, its curbstone has disappeared, but its drystone lining is perfectly preserved. It has been filled with various materials, including bones and ceramic shards, probably “occasional” materials. Its votive nature cannot be confirmed. Another well, with similar characteristics but smaller in diameter, was dug further north, in the kiln area.

==== Function ====
The votive function of the sanctuary (the cult of “healing waters”) seems to be confirmed by the discovery of a variety of objects in the vicinity: fish plates, bronze surgical tools (specilla (Note: "A specillum is a daily hygiene object, pharmaceutical or medical instrument consisting of a metal rod [...] one end of which is oblong [and the other] shaped like a spatula or spoon.)), and three lead ex-votos in the shape of eyes, the lozenge shape being common in the Loire Valley and northwestern Gaul. The ophthalmic equipment found in Pouillé may not have a ritual significance but could testify to the existence of a nearby eye-care dispensary. Medicine and religion would thus be associated in Pouillé.

This hypothesis seems to be accepted in the most recent publications, although it is not unanimously accepted, as the temple, basin, and furniture are not necessarily linked; furthermore, the objects identified on site are of types common to other sanctuaries. Because of its small size, it is unlikely that this was a public worship group for the surrounding population, as has been suggested. A sanctuary for one of the artisans' guilds operating on the site is more likely.

Sanctuary of Pouillé.

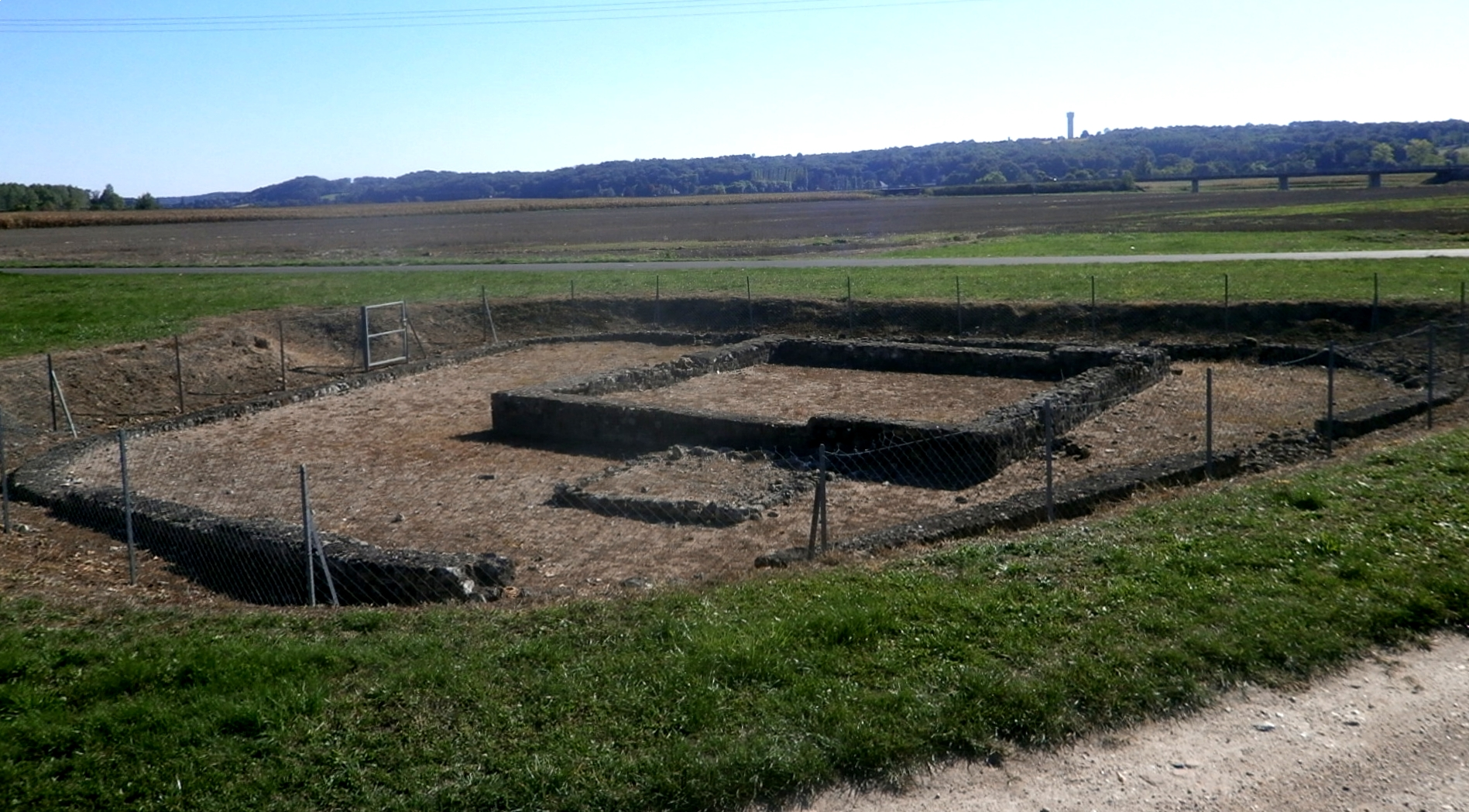
Looking south from the Tasciaca fanum.

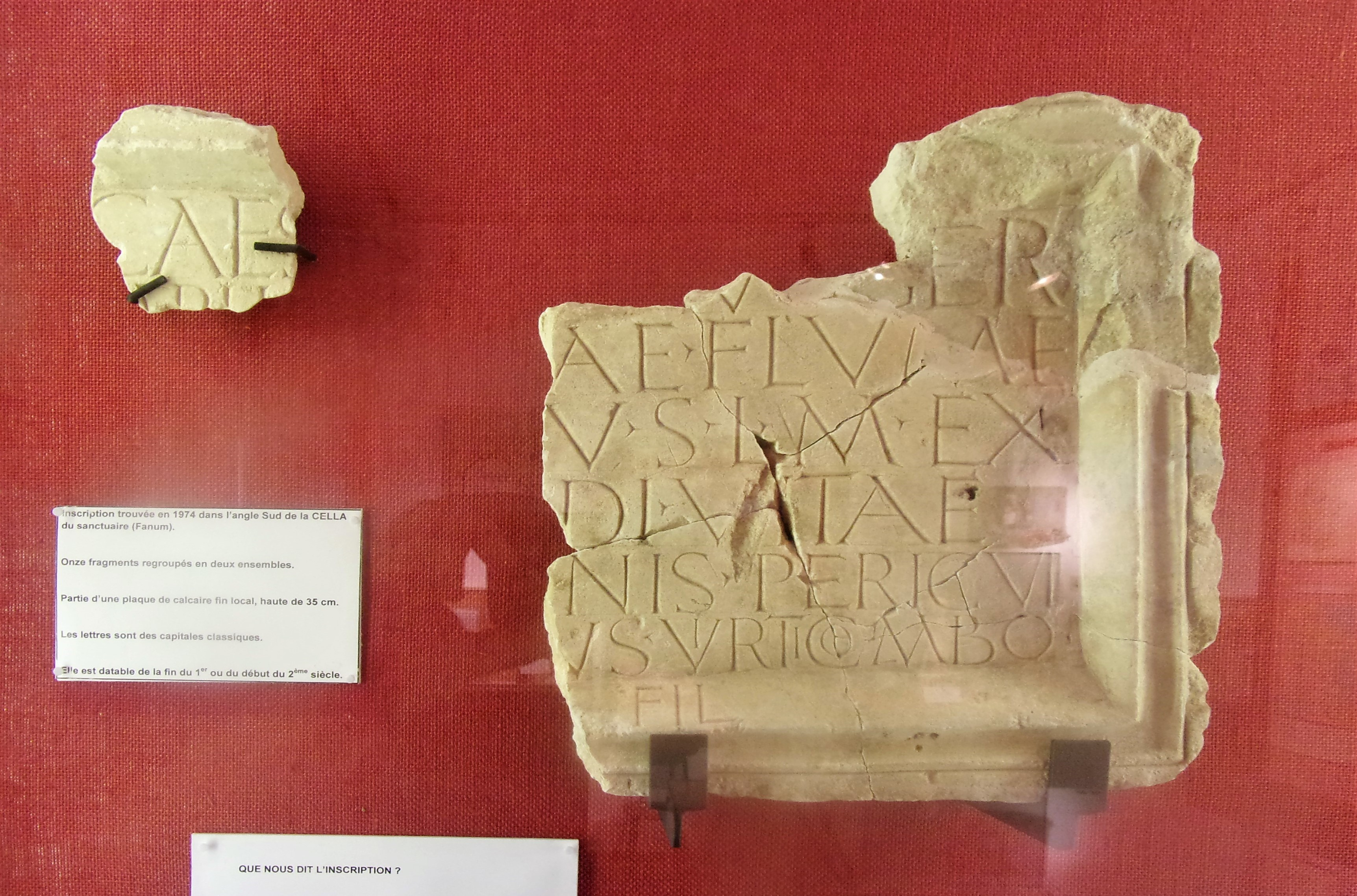
Dedicatory inscription from the Pouillé temple (Musée de Thésée).

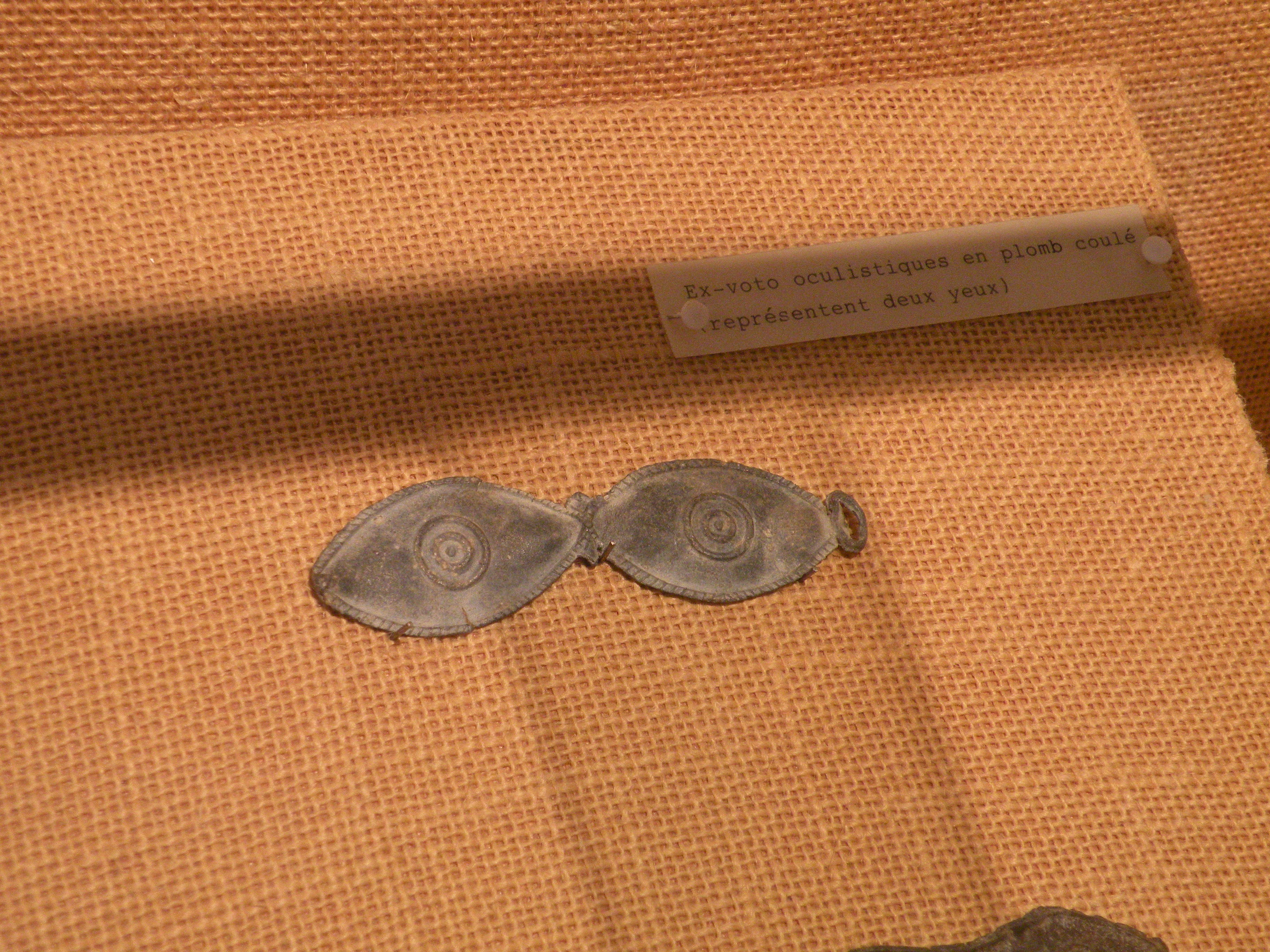
Ex-voto depicting eyes (Musée de Thésée).

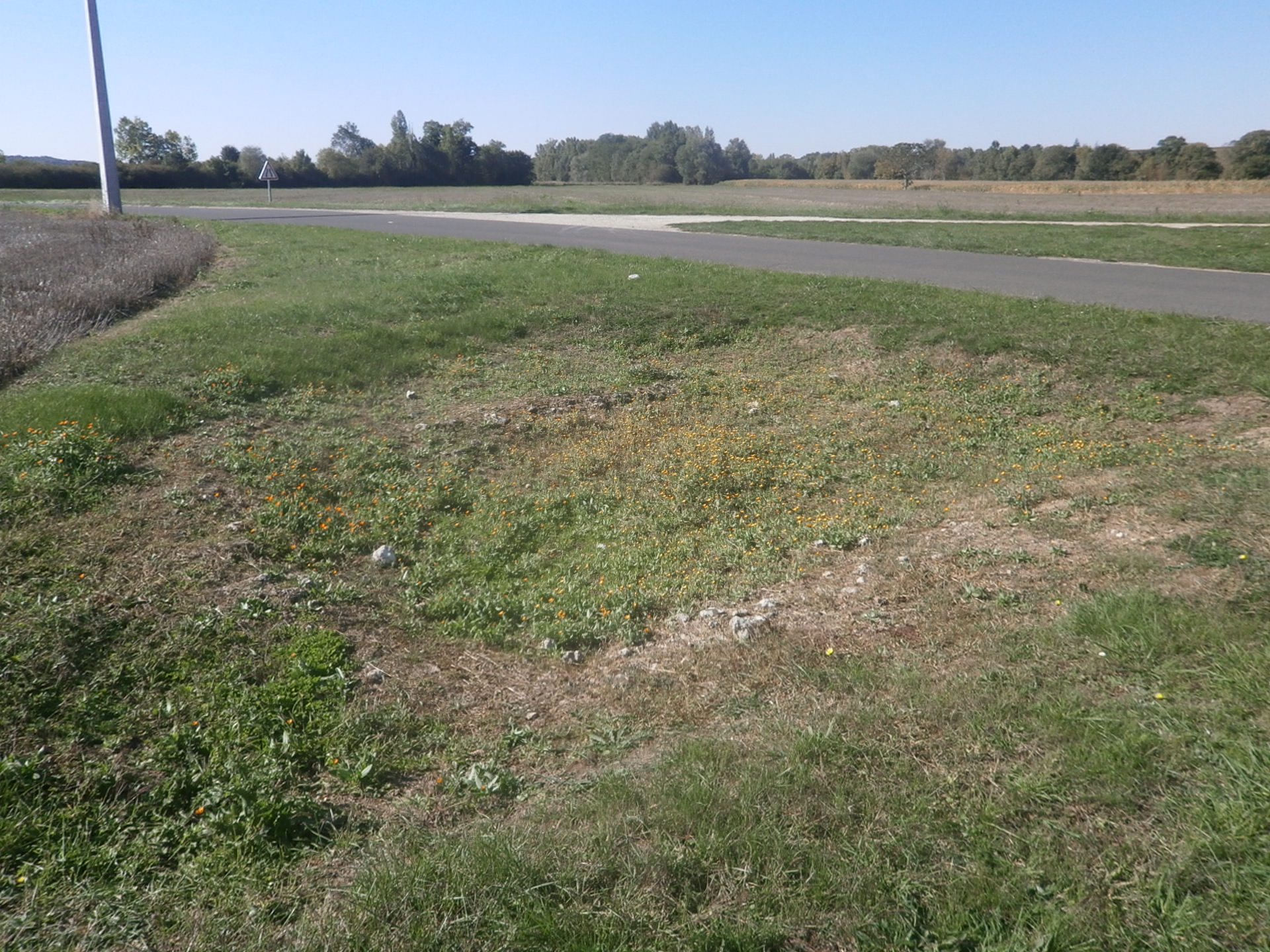
View of the basin to the northwest.

Basin plan.

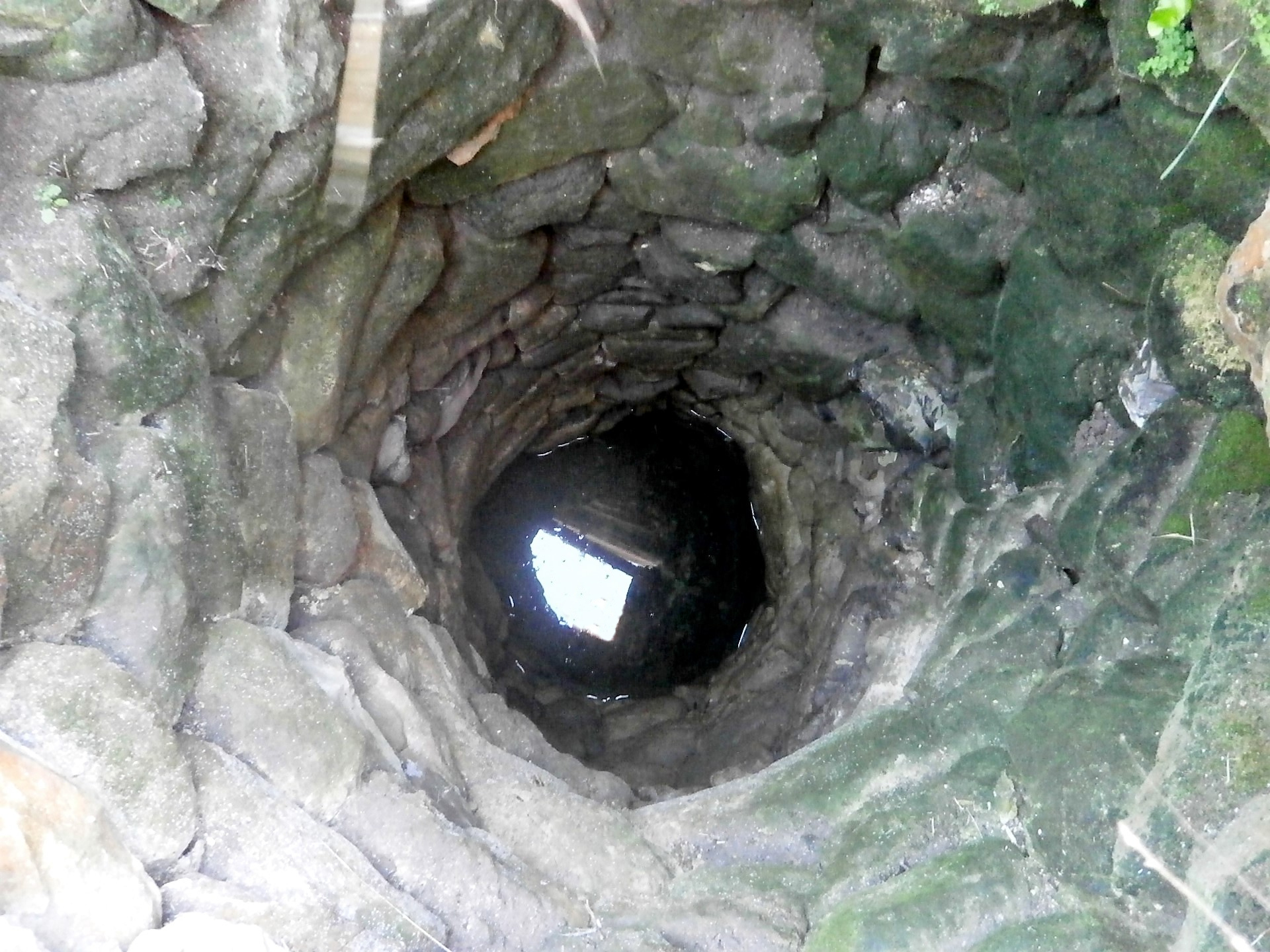
Well.

=== Craft activities ===
==== Furnaces ====
Simplified diagram of an ancient potter's kiln of the “sole” type.

The Tasciaca site developed a significant pottery industry (ceramics and vinous amphorae), as evidenced by the numerous potters' kilns found on both banks of the Cher, with a greater concentration on the left bank (La Soler and later Les Bordes), according to available data. The existence of twenty-three kilns is attested, and the presence of around twenty more is assumed.

All these kilns are of the hearth type, in which the pottery to be fired is placed on a perforated firing hearth heated from below. A masonry or clay vault covers the kiln; it is destroyed after firing to allow the fired pottery to be recovered, then rebuilt for the next firing, if the overall condition of the kiln does not justify its abandonment. The limited lifespan of kilns of this type may partly explain their large number at Tasciaca; three of them, built and then demolished successively, are superimposed on the same site. A closer look at fourteen of Pouillé's furnaces shows that they vary in size, with combustion chamber diameters ranging from 1.05 to 1.98 m, and that at least four of them are arranged in groups.

Having been in operation for between 100 and 150 years, the furnaces use local resources: clay extracted nearby, water from the Cher and fuel taken from the Pouillé woods.

=== Local production ===
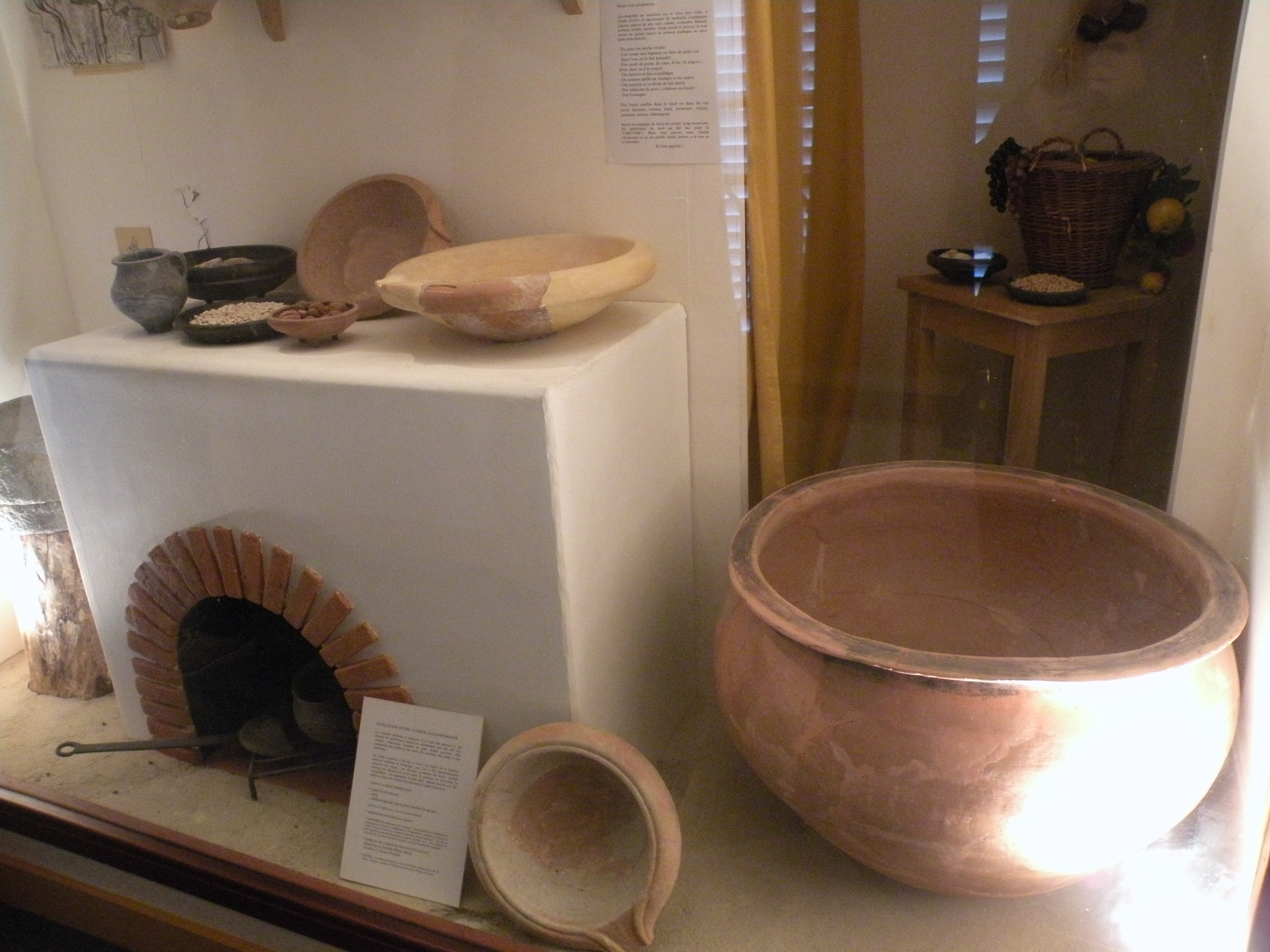
Ceramics from the Thésée workshops (Thésée museum).

Tasciaca potters' kilns produced mainly common ceramics; 70% of the pottery shards found in local production are of this type. By the mid-1st century, kilns were producing plates, bowls, vases, and pots. As techniques improved, mortars and jugs with molded necks began to be produced, with both the most recent and the oldest types being manufactured until the middle of the 2nd century.

There is also evidence of amphora production in the second half of the 1st century, with some shards found in the backfill of former baking ovens. The manufacture of amphorae confirms the presence of a wine-producing basin around Thésée, as is the case in Mougon (Indre-et-Loire), Vendée, Burgundy or Rhineland, where the link between these two activities has been made and the boom in wine-growing may have been a determining factor in the development of ceramic craftsmanship at Tasciaca.

Production of common ceramics at the Tasciaca site

Sites where Tasciaca pottery and techniques are exported

seemed to have been fairly locally distributed when excavations were carried out in the 1970s, but the discovery in 2005 of pottery shards at the Cinq-Mars pile site, 64 km west of Thésée as the crow flies, has tempered this assessment. Ceramics from the Tasciaca workshops seem to be distributed in the Cher and Loire valleys, both upstream and downstream of the production site; if the products themselves are not marketed, it is the manufacturing techniques developed at Tasciaca that seem to be spreading to other sites.

Although no workshop has yet been discovered, tile production at Tasciaca is certain, but the debris found is too fragmented to be characterized and dated. Loom weights, perhaps from the Pouillé kilns, are also present.

==== Imported products ====
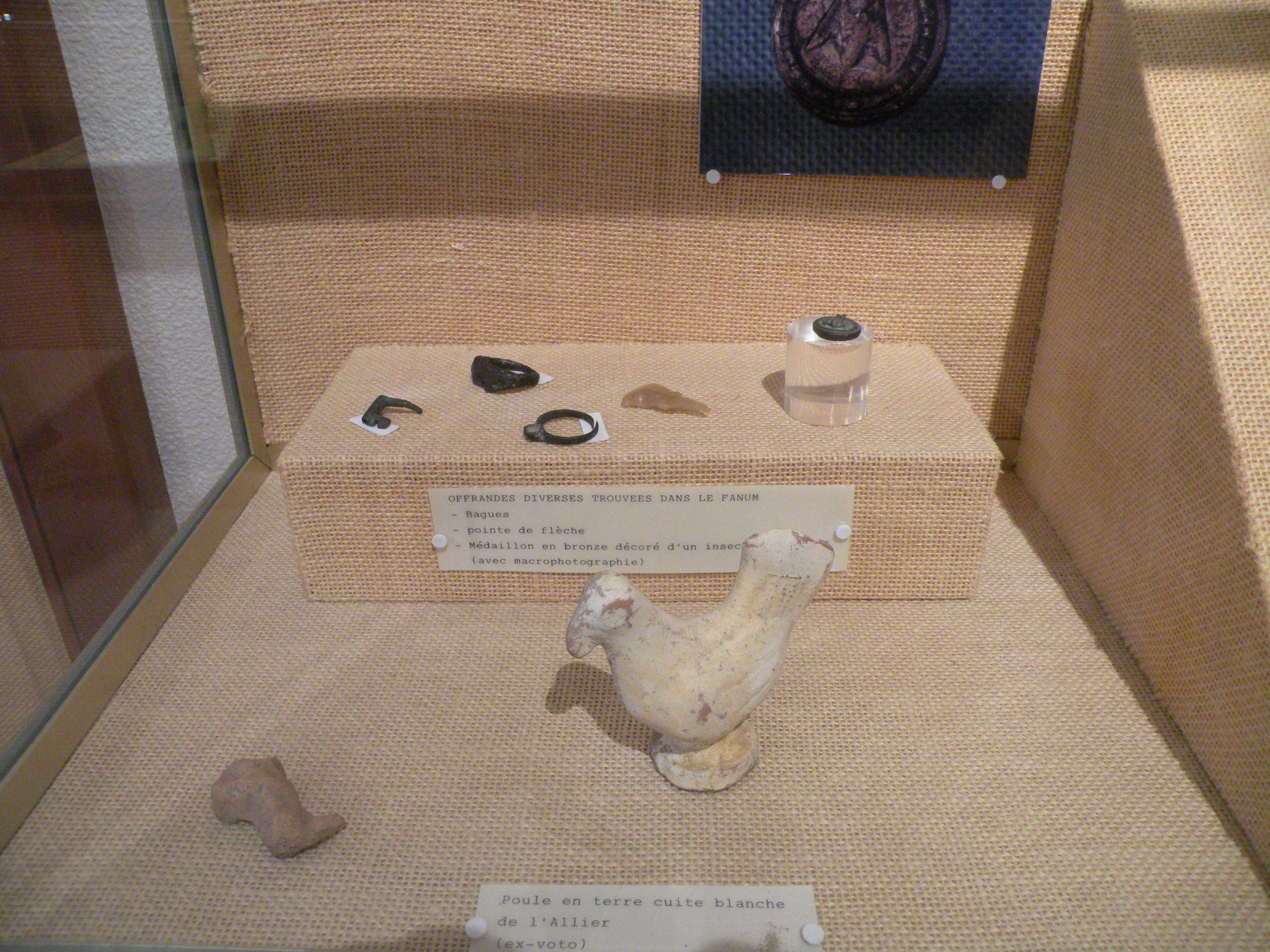
Figurine of a hen (Musée de Thésée).

Tasciaca was also involved in the resale of “luxury” sigillated ceramics from other production sites, the Italian peninsula from the beginning of our era, but above all from workshops in central Gaul (Lezoux) at the same time and southern Gaul such as La Graufesenque or Banassac a few decades later.

The site also yielded shards of fine ceramics, mainly pots, beakers and cups, whose production in workshops in the south-west, Burgundy (“Beuvray type”), the Loire Valley and the Allier is attested as early as the beginning of our era. On the other hand, production from eastern Gaul does not seem to be represented at Tasciaca.

Alongside local production, several Italic amphorae from the late 1st century B.C. have also been identified, as well as votive objects or figurines, such as three incomplete statuettes of Venus, probably from a workshop in the Allier region, and a terracotta hen of a known type whose provenance cannot be determined.

==== Glassware and jewelry ====
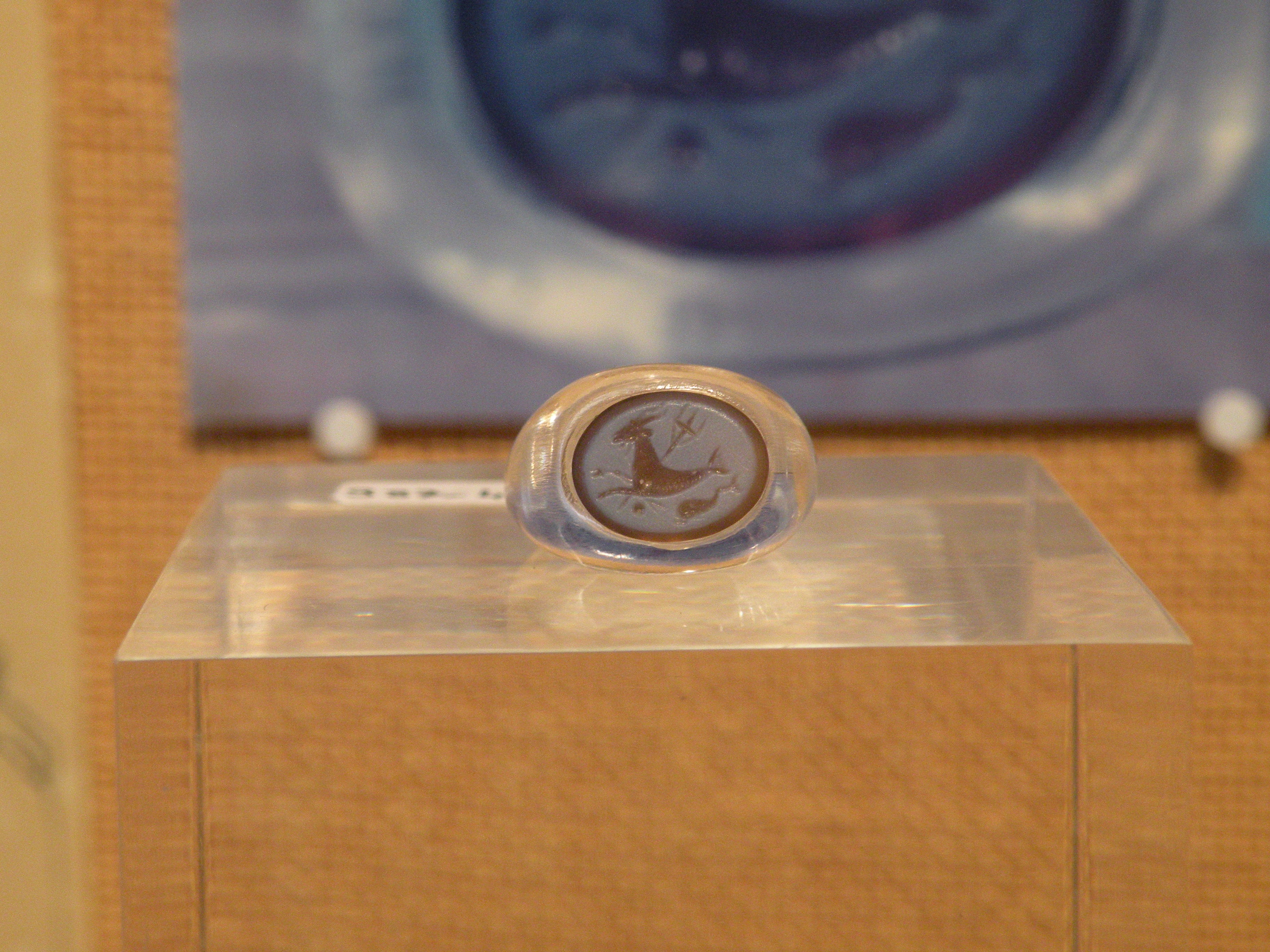
Capricorn intaglio (Musée de Thésée).

Early excavations in the Pouillé artisanal sector and more recent surveys in the Thésée and Monthou-sur-Cher areas have revealed the presence of glass objects dating from the first three centuries AD. In Pouillé, they are sometimes accompanied by molten glass amalgams, implying that they were made on-site. At Thésée, fragments of a furnace associated with molten glass waste, sometimes mixed with clay, suggest the existence of a glassmaker's workshop.

The objects found are mainly tableware (cups, bowls, goblets, bottles and vases). Glass jewelry (sometimes with associated gemstones such as agate), beads, and rings are also present. As with other manufactured objects, the artefacts found at Tasciaca combine supposedly local production with objects from workshops spread over a very wide geographical area, and sometimes even far away (bowl made in northern Italy) according to the nomenclature established by Clasina Isings.

==== Metallurgy ====
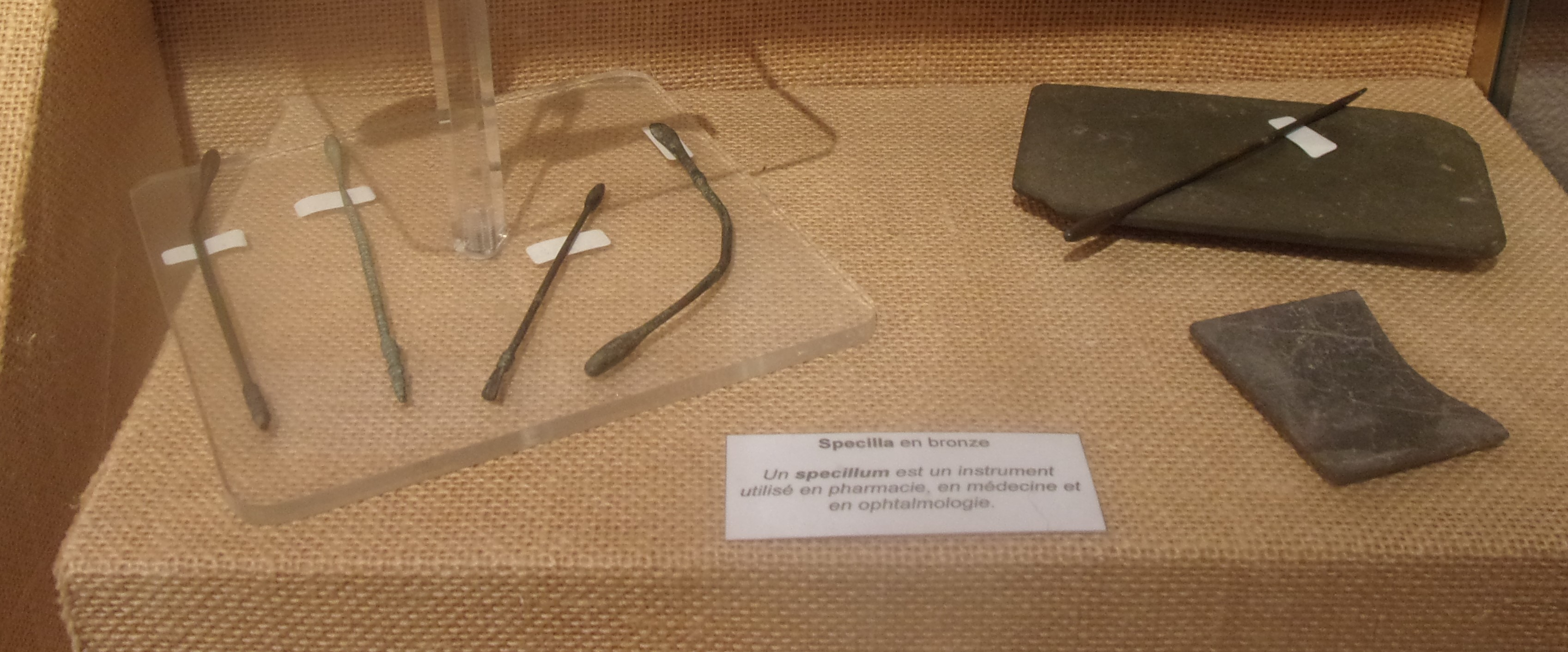
Specilla (medical and ophthalmological instruments) (Musée de Thésée).

Metalworking activities are also attested to by the presence of significant metal waste - some slag blocks weigh 2 kg - found at Pouillé, although no forging equipment has been formally identified. Iron ore does not seem to be present in the Tasciaca environment, and the origin of the ore worked on site is unknown.

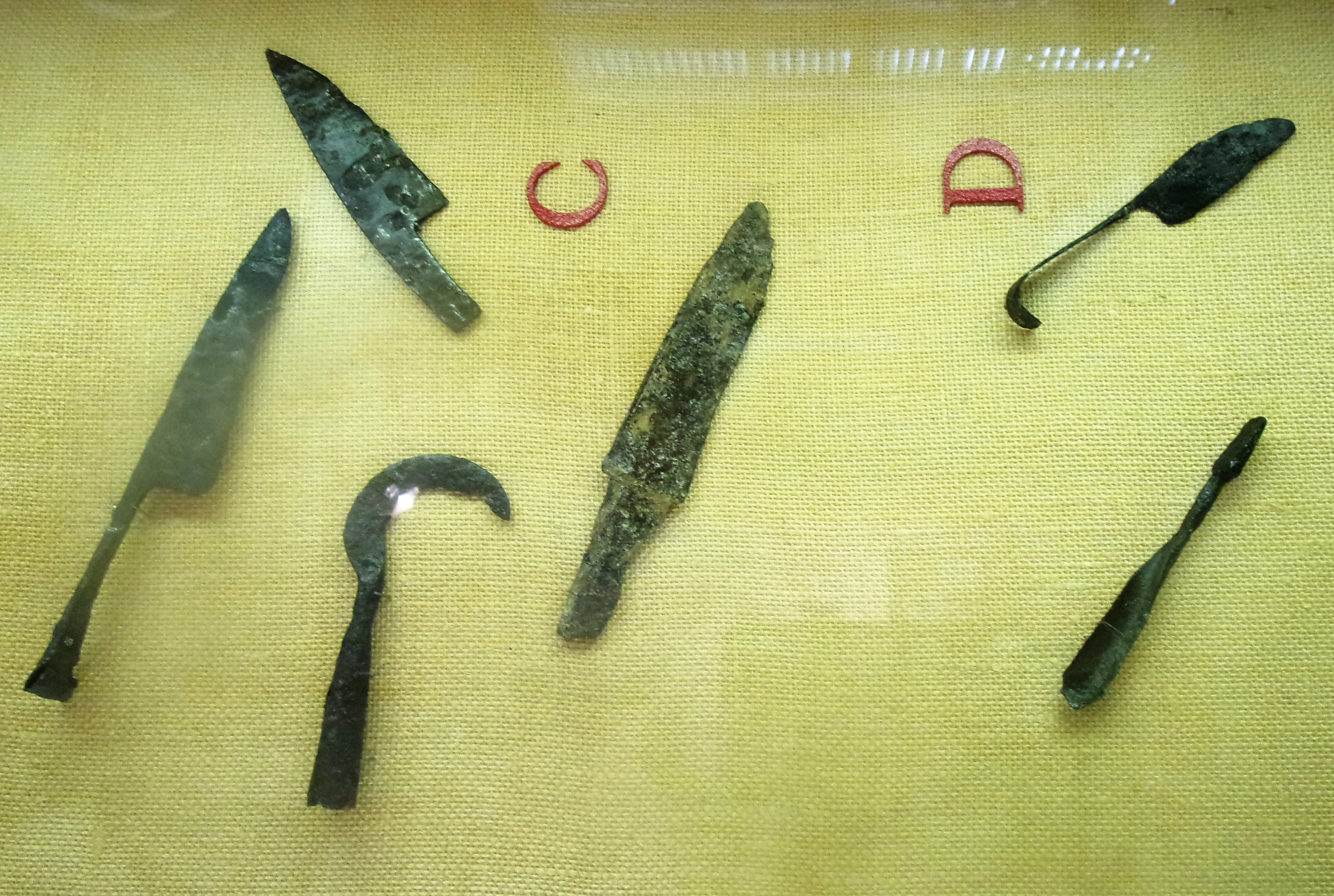
Farming tools (Musée de Thésée).

Manufactured tools, found almost exclusively on the left bank of the Cher, are mainly utilitarian objects, fibulae, but also body-care utensils (spatulas, tweezers, ear picks) or medicine utensils (bronze special), agricultural tools (serpettes), harnessing and locksmithing items. A few devotional objects, such as eye-shaped ex-votos, were also unearthed - some fibulae were probably deposited for votive purposes. All of these objects were either locally produced or “imported” (from Aquitaine, Burgundy, Switzerland, Germania).

Manufactured tools, found almost exclusively on the left bank of the Cher, are mainly utilitarian objects, fibulae, but also body-care utensils (spatulas, tweezers, ear picks) or medicine utensils (bronze specilla), agricultural tools (serpettes), harnessing and locksmithing items. A few devotional objects, such as eye-shaped ex-votos, were also unearthed - some fibulae were probably deposited for votive purposes. All these objects were either locally produced or “imported” (from Aquitaine, Burgundy, Switzerland, Germania).

An exception is a statuette representing a 4 cm-high bronze owl, found in an excavation pit in the town of Thésée, near a potter's kiln. This statuette was stolen in 1975. (Note: A specillum stolen from Theseus at the same time as this owl was found at a sale at the Hôtel Drouot in Paris in 1980.)

=== Facilities with ill-defined functions ===
==== Monthou-sur-Cher ====
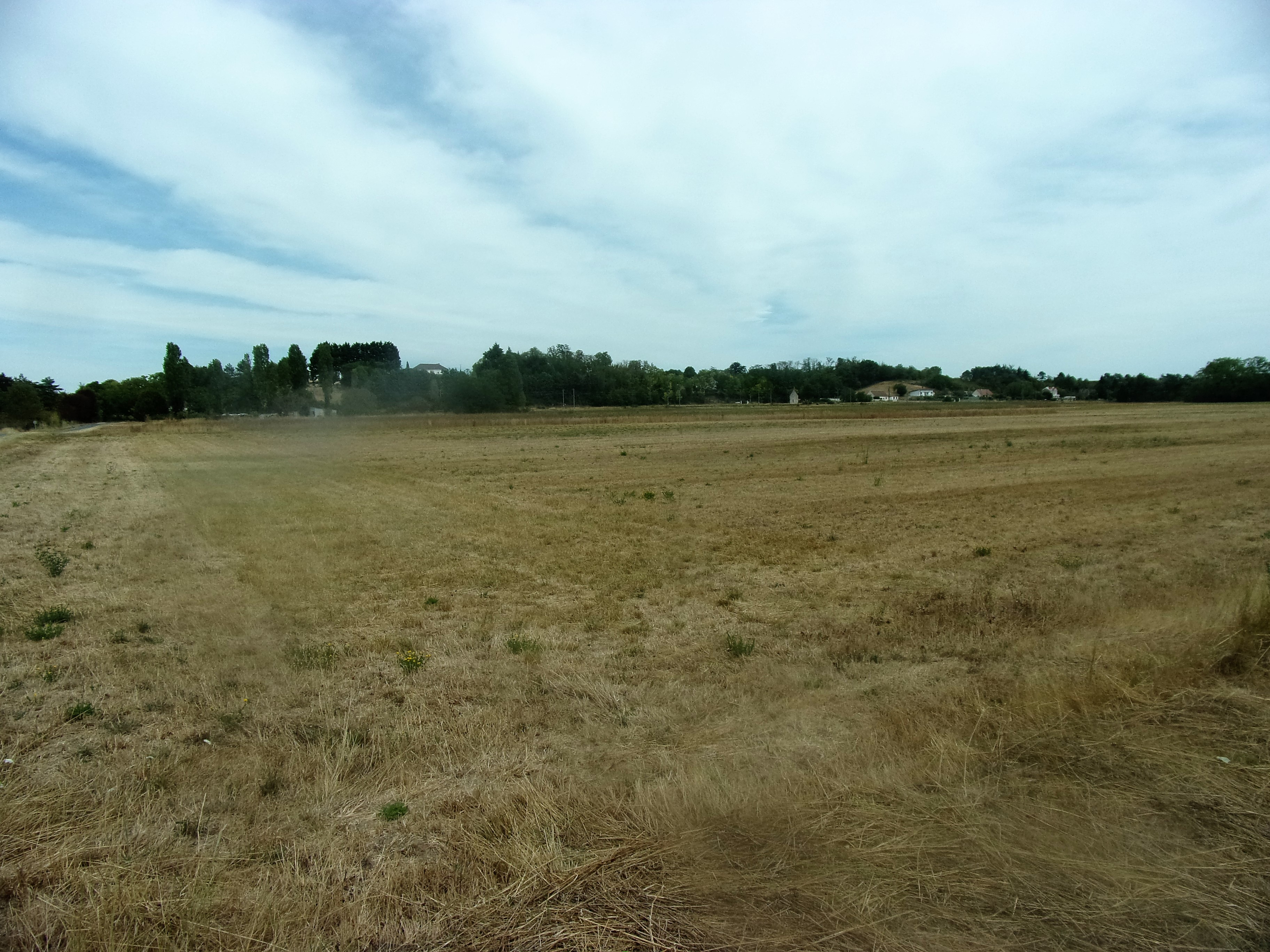
The Moulin du Ru site in Monthou-sur-Cher.

In the Monthou-sur-Cher commune, at a place called Moulin du Ru, Louis de La Saussaye, following excavations carried out between 1830 and 1840, reported on a whole series of structures that he attributed “to a locality of some importance” or to “the villa of an inhabitant of ancient Theseus ”. These remains were also noted during a visit to the site by archaeologists and scholars in 1853. The construction of the royal road from Tours to Vierzon, now the D 976 (1834), the railway line from Vierzon to Saint-Pierre-des-Corps (1869), and the general raising of the ground in the area to prevent the effects of flooding (late 19th century) greatly reshaped the site. Previous flood silt deposits, land consolidation, and the excavation and subsequent filling of a fish farm pond all contributed to the upheaval of the soils in this area, which was also heavily wooded in modern times.

The program of investigations initiated in 2003 over a wide geographical area revealed three sets of structures - no remains of which are visible on the ground - covering a total surface area of around 13 ha. The first, which is difficult to read, may correspond to several juxtaposed buildings or a single compartmentalized building. To the north of this complex, two parallel linear traces suggest the presence of a road, perhaps Bourges-Tours. The second group shows a large partitioned building measuring at least 100 × 30 m, one of whose rooms may have been the hearth of a thermal bath. The third and last group of buildings could be the site of a fanum. A large quantity of furniture (ceramics, glass, metal objects) was found throughout the site, dating from the Gallic period to the beginning of the 4th century. Finally, large blocks of mortar (crushed bricks and bonding cement) used in modern constructions may be of ancient originC 59. Taken together, these remains may correspond to a hamlet situated between the Roman road and the Cher river, although the buildings do not appear to be oriented towards the road, as is usually the case. The presence of a possible ancient quay, between Moulin du Ru and Mazelles, establishes the geographical continuity of occupation in this sector.

==== Pouillé ====
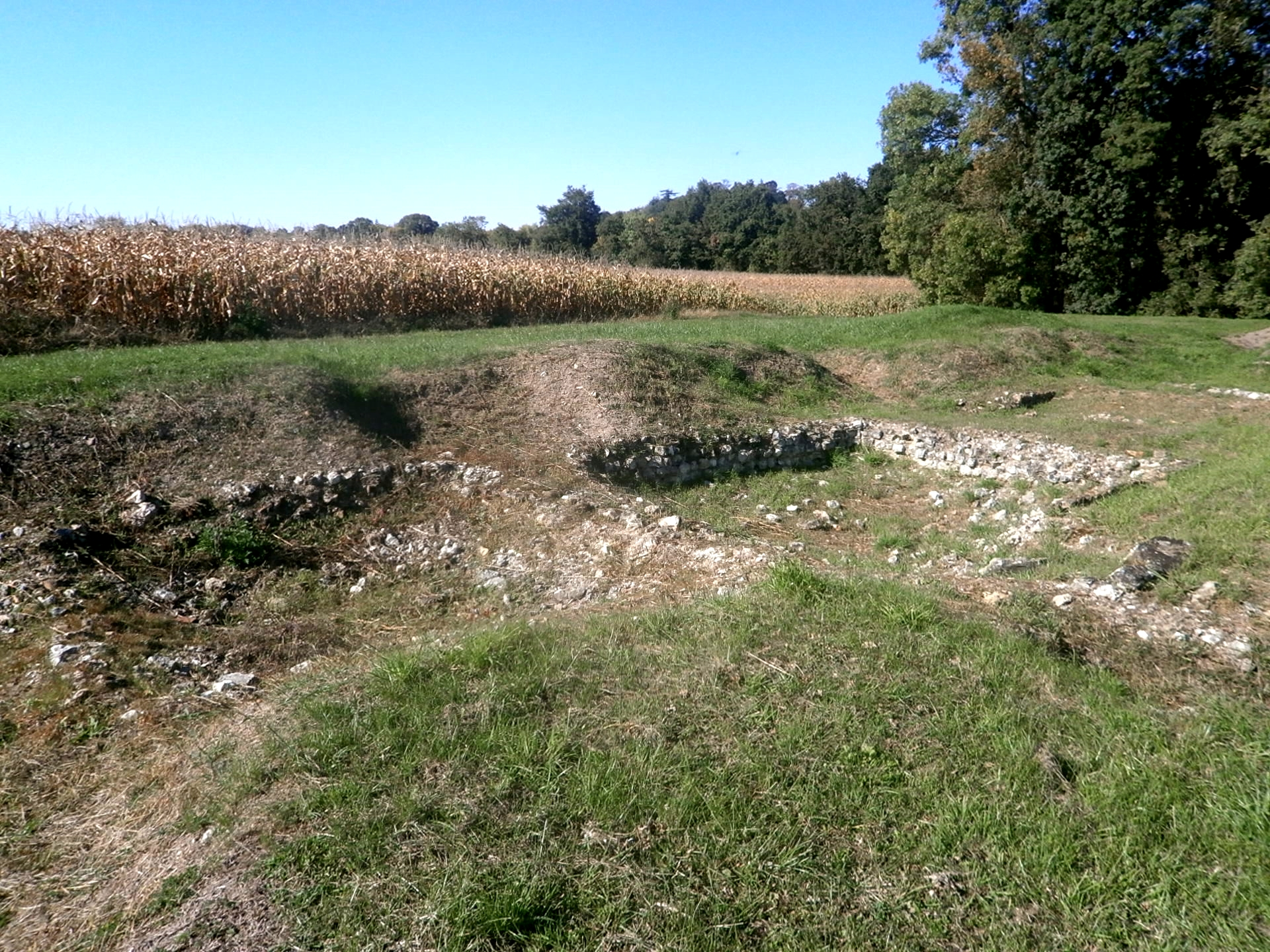
Vestiges of buildings of indefinite function (Pouillé).

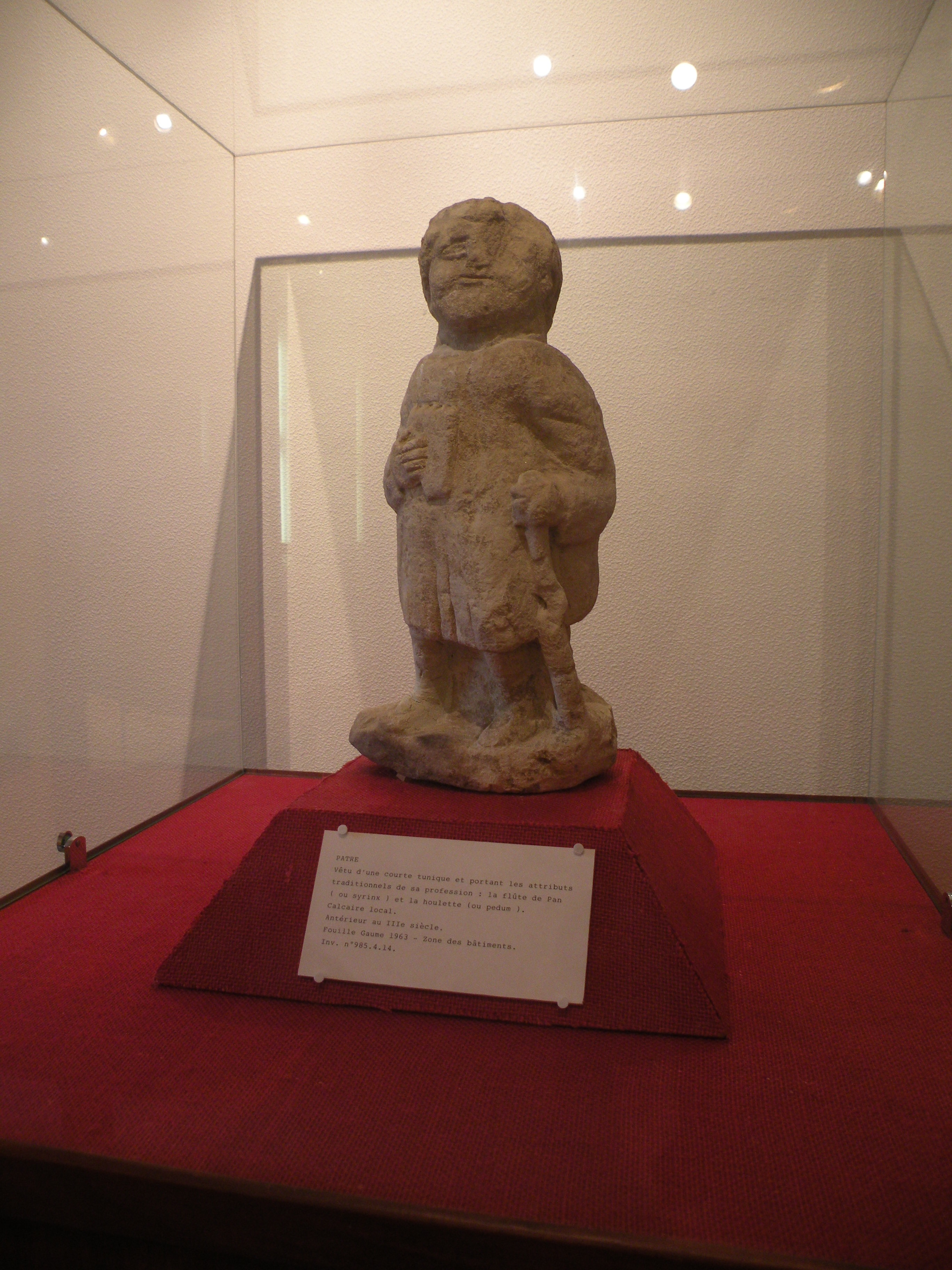
Limestone statuette (Musée de Thésée).

On the left bank of the Cher, in addition to the sanctuary (fanum, basin, and possibly well) and the potters' kilns, there's a vast complex of walls identified in 1973. They line the ancient road and the known surface area of the whole complex is around 6 ha. The two main buildings in this complex are rectangular, measuring 48.10 x 14.80 and 29 x 12 m. Adjoining each other on one of their longest sides, they are partitioned and feature basement cellars that have yielded several probably votive objects, including a limestone statuette depicting a shepherd holding a Pan flute.

Schematic plan of large buildings (earlier constructions are not shown)

Their large size (like the buildings of a villa), their presence near the kiln area (like warehouses), and the presence of votive objects in their cellars (like buildings of which at least one part has a cultic vocation) are all non-concordant elements that do not allow us to attribute a precise use to them.

Beneath these buildings lie the remains of older, identically oriented structures, whose precise nature and function are unknown, but numerous fragments of Gallic pottery have been found in this stratum. Aerial photographs and electrical and magnetic surveys also reveal the presence of other large structures (at least 40 m long for one of them), the remains of which appear very degraded, on either side of the buildings already excavated in the 1960s and 1970s. Some of these may also have been used to store pottery.

==== Thésée ====
Access to possible ancient remains in the town of Thésée itself comes up against the usual obstacles of urban archaeology: potential remains buried under multiple more recent anthropic strata, small excavation areas often resulting from opportunity, very short timeframe for their examination. The remains of Gallo-Roman buildings have been reported in the village, including a potter's kiln, dumps and other remains that have not yet been identified. Recent research has revealed the presence of a large number of artifacts (architectural terracotta, pottery shards, glass paste). The furnishings are frequent closer to the Cher, and increasingly rare the further away you get.

=== Public facilities to discover ===
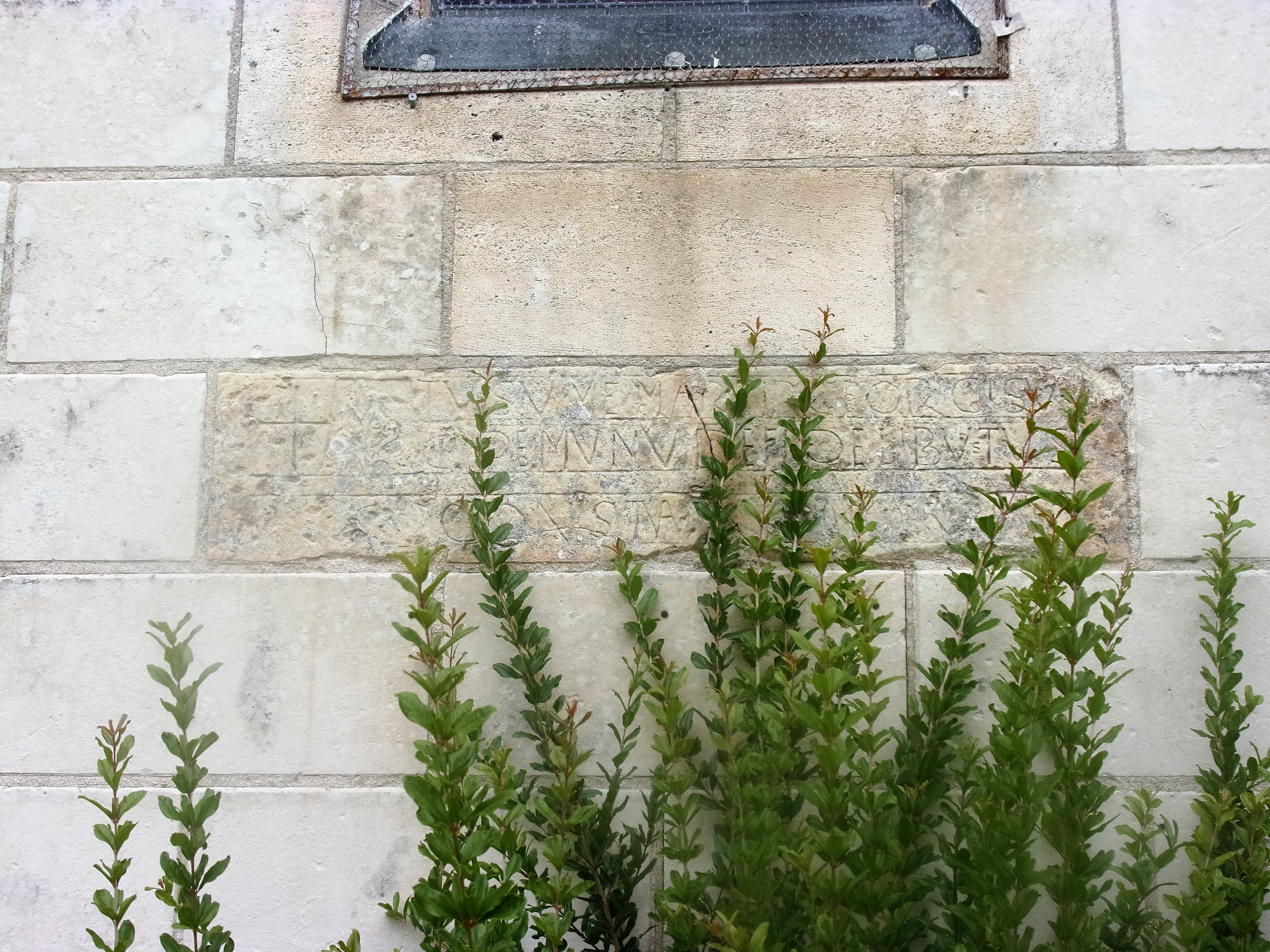
Carolingian engraved block in the church of Saint-Georges in Thésée.

Given the state of knowledge available in the 21st century, no buildings or facilities for public use (forum, baths, large public temple, water supply system) have been identified on the Tasciaca site, even though the quality of the masonry on the Mazelles complex could make these buildings part of this corpus. The existence of a necropolis also raises questions: isolated burials have been discovered, with no indication of a concentration in a given place and no possibility of dating, due to their poor state of preservation.

The heart of this secondary agglomeration, which would have grouped one or more of these monuments, remains to be located if it exists. It may well have been located beneath the present-day village of Thésée, where the greatest concentration of remains and furnishings can be found on the right bank; the absence of any large-scale excavations in this sector would then be the only reason for this gap in our topographical knowledge of the ancient site. The fact that, of all the poles active in Antiquity, only that of Theseus survived and developed in the Middle Ages also lends credence to this hypothesis, but there is no evidence to support it.

== Secondary conurbation functions ==
The existence of a secondary settlement on the Tasciaca site, growing in size and scope as archaeological discoveries are made, is no longer in doubt, but its function remains debated. This uncertainty is compounded by the lack of information concerning the heart of the agglomeration, the ad hoc nature of the earliest studies, the fragility of the hypotheses formulated concerning the Moulin du Ru sector at Monthou-sur-Cher, and ignorance of the exact function of the Mazelles complex, which nonetheless appears to be a major development of the agglomeration.

=== A proven production and trading center ===
Tasciaca was, at least between the second half of the 1st century and the beginning of the 2nd century, a major center for the production of ceramics, glassware, and metallurgy. As the production capacity of the Thésée-Pouillé kilns far exceeded local needs, certainly, the agglomeration was also the seat of a major trade along the Cher, for Tasciaca products, including pottery, but also products “imported” from other sites (Lezoux, La Graufesenque) and then resold.

=== Probable administrative, political, and religious functions ===
The mention of Tasciaca on the Peutinger table implies the existence of a road station, but there's nothing to suggest that the Mazelles complex had such a function. Beyond this, the pieces of furniture found, notably in Pouillé (hipposandals, bits, harness parts), seal boxes perhaps linked to imperial mail, militate in favor of attributing to this agglomeration a role that was presumed to be important beyond its commercial function, on the ancient road from Bourges to Tours, along the then navigable Cher and at the limits of three civitates. The nature of this role, whether unique or more likely multiple (administrative, fiscal, political), remains to be clarified.

In the south of the Cher, the presence of the sanctuary at Pouillé may be linked to the cult of an unidentified healing deity, particularly for ophthalmic care, in association with a dispensary dispensing such care, as suggested by the material and ex-voto found on site.

== See also ==
- Thésée
- Pouillé
- Monthou-sur-Cher
- La Tène culture

== Bibliography ==
- Magnan, Danielle; Amandry, Michel; Bourgeois, Claude; Comte, Dominique; Ruffier, Olivier; Plateau, Éric; Trombetta, Pierre-Jean (1982). Fouilles et méthodes archéologiques en Loir-et-Cher: Thésée-la-Romaine et Pouillé, château de Blois.
- collectif (1998). Le site archéologique de Thésée-Pouillé. Les fours de potiers de Tasciaca, Thésée. Les amis du musée de Thésée-Pouillé.
- Cadalen-Lesieur (2014). Thésée-Pouillé (Loir-et-Cher), l'agglomération antique, dans Élizabeth Zadora-Rio (dir.), Atlas Archéologique de Touraine: 53e supplément à la Revue archéologique du Centre de la France, Tours. FERACF.
- Cadalen-Lesieur, Jacqueline (2016). Nouvelle approche de l'agglomération antique de Tasciaca (Thésée, Pouillé, Monthou-sur-Cher, Loir-et-Cher) », dans Christian Cribellier (dir.), Agglomérations secondaires antiques en région Centre-Val de Loire (Volume 4): 64e supplément à la Revue archéologique du Centre de la France, Tours. FERACF. ISBN 978-2-9132-7250-7.
- Guitton, David; Tilhard, Jean-Louis; Delage, Richard (2012). Sigillée du groupe Centre-Ouest: état des lieux, dans Actes du congrès de Poitiers, Université de Poitiers. Marseille: SFECAG.
- Latrémolière, Élisabeth (1999). Thésée-Pouillé (Loir-et-Cher), dans Michel-Édouard Bellet, Christian Cribellier et Alain Ferdière (dir.), Agglomérations secondaires antiques en région Centre (Volume 1): 17e supplément à la Revue archéologique du Centre de la France Tours. FERACF. ISBN 2-9132-7203-7.
- Mornat, Évelyne (1997). Thésée, le monument des Maselles: mémoire de maîtrise. Paris: université de Paris-Sorbonne.
- Fauduet, Isabelle (1993). Les temples de tradition celtique en Gaule romaine. Paris: Errance. ISBN 978-2-8777-2074-8.
- Roach Smith, Charles (1854). Note on some of the antiquities or France, made during a fortnight's excursion in the summer of 1854. Londres.
- Gaston Cœuret (1977). "La céramique commune de l'atelier de Thésée-la-Romaine". Revue archéologique du Centre de la France. 16 (3): 325–337. doi:10.3406/racf.1977.2106.
- Cribellier, Christian (2016). Nouvelle approche de l'agglomération antique de Tasciaca (intro).
- Roux, Émilie (2013). Approche qualitative et quantitative de l'usage du mobilier non céramique dans les agglomérations (IIe s. av. J.-C. - IIIe s. apr. J.-C.): l'exemple des territoires turon, biturige et carnute : thèse de doctorat en archéologie / préhistoire, vol. I, II et III. Université François-Rabelais.
