= Romorantin - Pruniers Air Detachment =

DA 273 Romorantin - Pruniers Air Detachment Romorantin Aerodrome Air Service Production Center No. 2.
- Part of French Air Force; Armée de l'Air
- Located near: Romorantin-Lanthenay, France
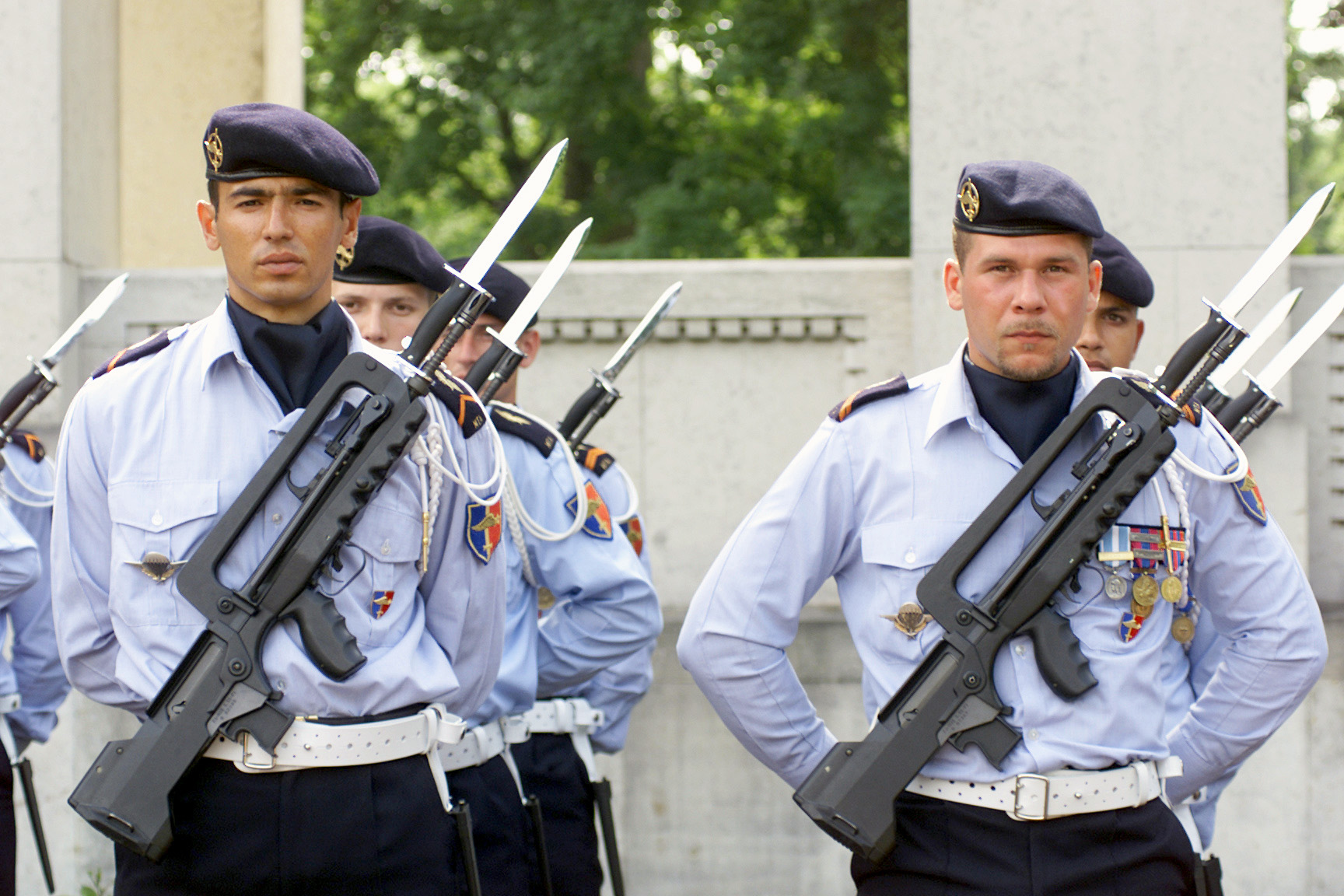
- French Air Force Riflemen-commando, armed with FAMAS F1 assault rifles,

Site information
- Owner: France
- Controlled by: French Air Force
- Condition: Air Force Station

Location
- Location within France
- Coordinates: 47°19′11″N 001°41′05″E

Site history
- Built: 1912
- In use: 1913–Present
- Battles/wars: World War I World War II

Garrison information
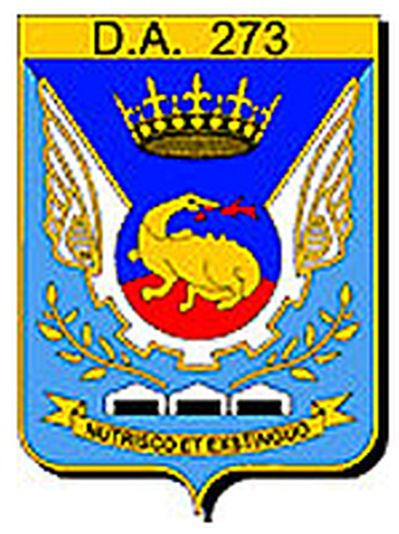
- Garrison: DA 273

Romorantin - Pruniers Air Detachment (DA 273) is a French Air Force military facility, located 6 kilometres (3.7 mi) southwest of Romorantin-Lanthenay, in the Loir-et-Cher department of central France.

Pruniers airfield was part of a huge depot built for the United States Army Air Service during World War I as an aircraft engineering facility. After the Armistice, the airfield stayed operational, with a French Air Force depot built in 1934. The airfield is slightly widened during World War II by the German Luftwaffe, but not much used. It returned to French control in September 1944, still as a depot.

== Overview ==
DA 273 is primarily a logistics base for repairing aircraft by maintaining warehouses of spare parts. It is also a center for printing and issuing the technical documentation for the French Air Force. It also operates a small grass airfield as center for glider pilot training. It has a worldwide reputation as the gliding training site for the air Air Force for national and international competitions.

The base employs approximately 650; half of the workforce are civilian personnel.

== History ==
The first aviation use of Romorantin was in 1911, when a professor at the Collège Maurice Genevoix in Romorantin set up a "Society pour le Développement de l'Aéronautique". On 3 June 1911, the new society organized the demonstration of a Blériot Aéronautique monoplane which was flown for eight and one-half minutes from the military training and firing range of "La Butte". After the flight, the crowd went wild and the Mayor offered champagne. After a second flight, this aviation event remained deeply marked in local annals. According to the elected officials at the time, there were more than 10,000 people in attendance at the demonstration.

On 31 March 1912, the city council received a letter from the Ligue National Aéronautique (an aviation lobbying association whose president was Georges Clemenceau) suggesting that some land be provided for an airfield. With the help of the LNA, a "station aéronautique" is set on the military range of La Butte, one miles out of Romorantin, on the road leading to the futur Pruniers airfield, with one hangar at the edge of the field; the new aerodrome was inaugurated in June 1913. No civil aircraft were permanently based as the station was mostly designed to bring shelter for passing aircraft: in 1913, during military manoeuvres, some French Aeronautique Militaire's planes landed at the airfield, on a stop-over to Limoges.

=== World War I ===
From 1915, the "La Butte" airfield was often used by the trainer aircraft from the Avord air school; it was event projected for a time to build a flying school on the airfield. With the construction of the American depot at Pruniers, the "old" airfield was abandoned and used to store disused aircraft.

In early 1917, after the entry of the United States into the war, the site of Pruniesr was chosen over eight others for use by the Air Service of the American Expeditionary Forces for the establishment of a large Air Force Depot, eventually known as the Air Service Production Center No. 2. Romorantin was selected due to the low population density, the flatness of the terrain, the large presence of timber and also the fact that a large number or railroads between the Atlantic shipping ports converged there and also went into the Zone of the Advance (Western Front).

==== Facilities ====
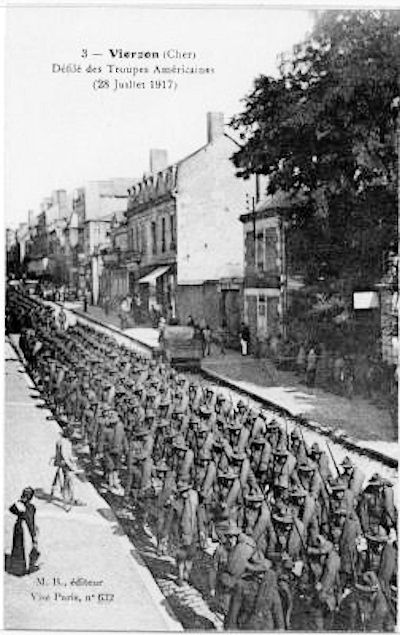
American Arrival in Romorantin, France, 28 June 1917

On 28 June 1917, the first American forces arrived, the 75th, 109th and 116th Aero Squadrons (Construction) which initially established quarters for themselves in the French Army Camp des Bluets about three miles away from the facility. The first construction was that of a railroad line and barracks for themselves at the field.

Within two weeks, the barracks were ready and construction of the actual base was begun. The 116th Squadron was transferred out and the 75th and 109th were re-designated as the 487th Aero (Construction) and 803d Aero (Repair). Construction then began in earnest on the base facilities and also two landing field. Additional units brought in for construction were the 465th and 493d Aero Squadrons (Construction).

A compound for the American soldiers assigned to Romorantin was established at a French barracks named North Camp Gièvres in the nearby town of Pruniers-en-Sologne. The camp eventually became the home of almost 30,000 personnel, living in barracks. However, their influence in Pruniers, along with the towns of Gièvres, Villefranche-sur-Cher and Romorantin was evident. They made many friends with the local inhabitants and frequented the shops, restaurants and taverns daily. Also the Americans relied on the local economy for civilian workers such as bakers, cooks, and various tradesmen.

Eventually the facility consisted of over 200 buildings on 40 hectares (99 acres) of land; a gasoline and oil depot; refrigerator plant; weapons storage area, a workshop for locomotive repair; three aircraft landing fields along with extensive aircraft assembly and repair buildings along with aircraft hangars at the landing fields and a large balloon hangar. Major buildings on the base were:

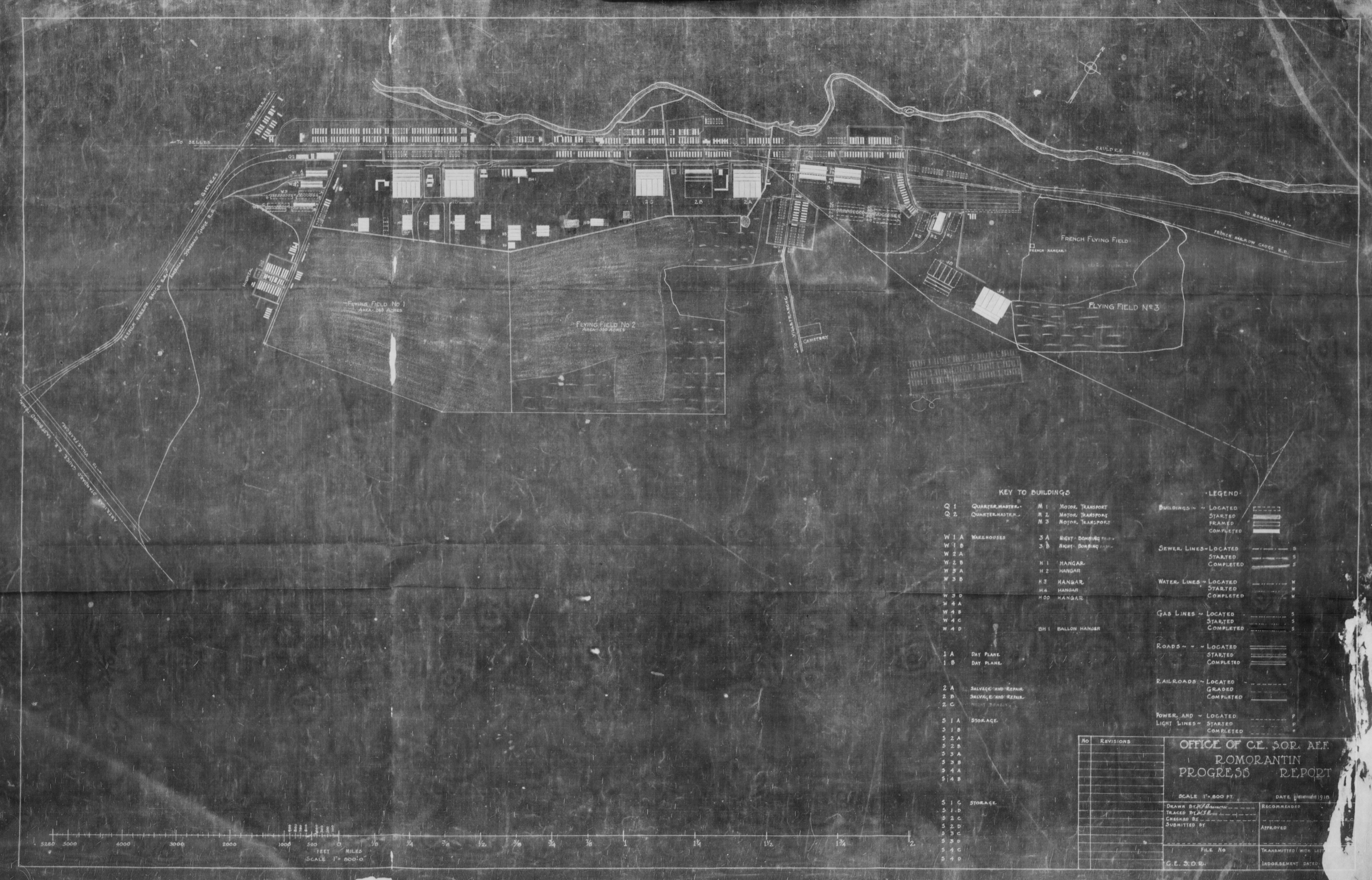
Air Service Production Center No. 2 site map, 1918

- Q1 and Q2 - Quartermaster Storage
- W1-A/B, W2-A/B, W3-A/B/D, W-4A/B/C/D - General Storage Warehouses
- 1-A/B - DH-4 Day Aircraft Assembly
- 2-C - DH-4 Night Bomber Assembly
- 2-A/B DH-4 Salvage and Repair
- S-1A/B/C/D, S-2A/B/C/D, S-3A/B/C/D, S-4A/B/C/D General Aircraft Storage
- M-1/2/3 - Motor Transport
- 3-A/B Night Bombing Warehouses

There were four airfield hangars (H-1/2/3/4) and a Balloon Hangar (BH-2) on two main airfields.

What was unique about the center was that the American-built railroads on the site amounted to over 200 km (120 mi) of narrow-gauge and standard-gauge trackage. Over 14,000 railroad cars of all types and 200 locomotives were assigned to the facility by the time of the Armistice in November 1918.

==== Operations ====
Initially, the main purpose of the center was the assembly and final testing of airplanes and engines manufactured in the United States. However the center also developed into a major supply depot for the Dayton-Wright built DH-4 along with the Liberty Engines. It also was a storage and repair depot for all balloons used by the Air Service.

DH-4 Aircraft Assembly and Repair

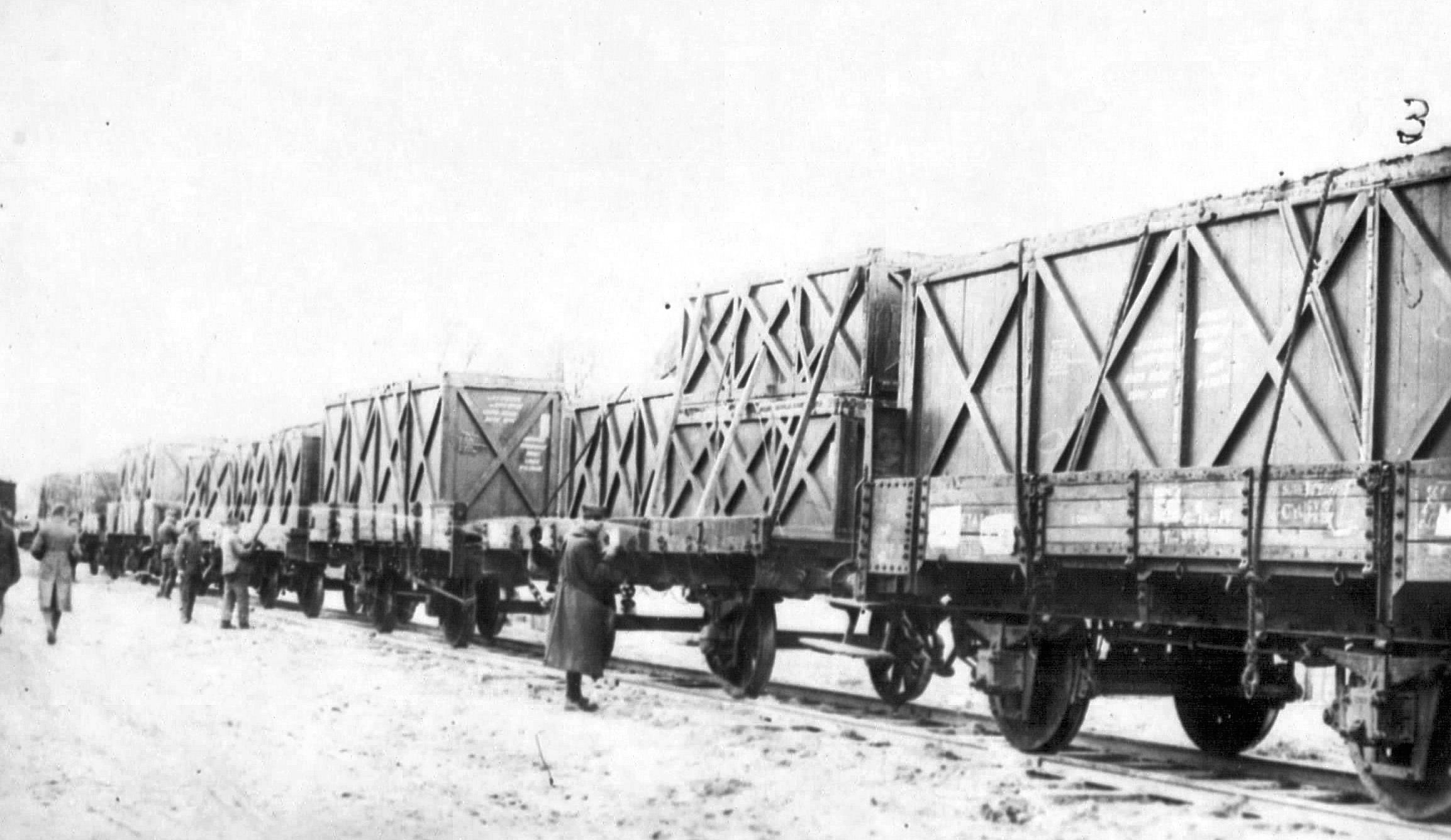
Dh-4 crates on rail cars arriving at Romorantin

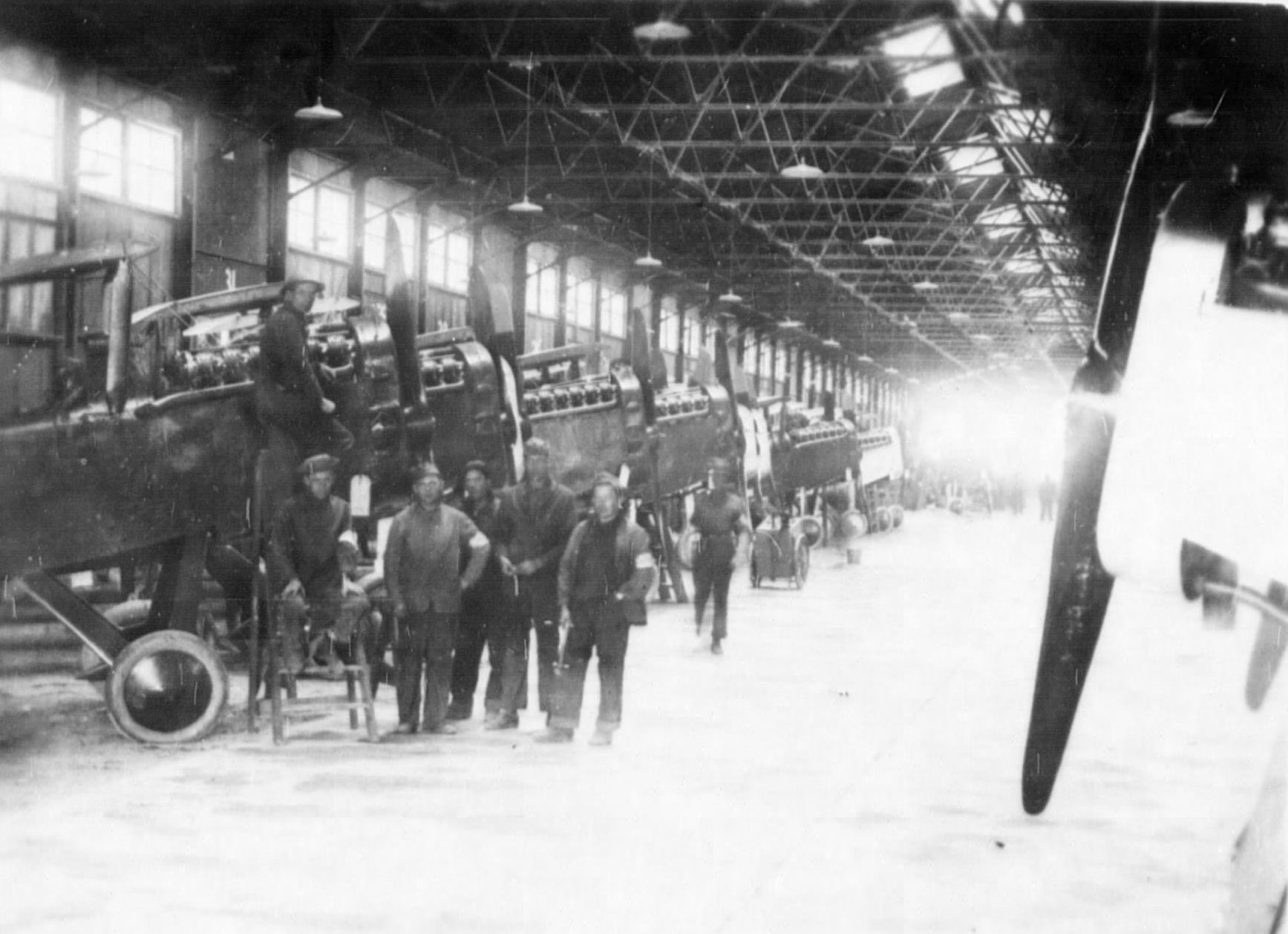
V-12 Liberty Engine installation in building 1-A

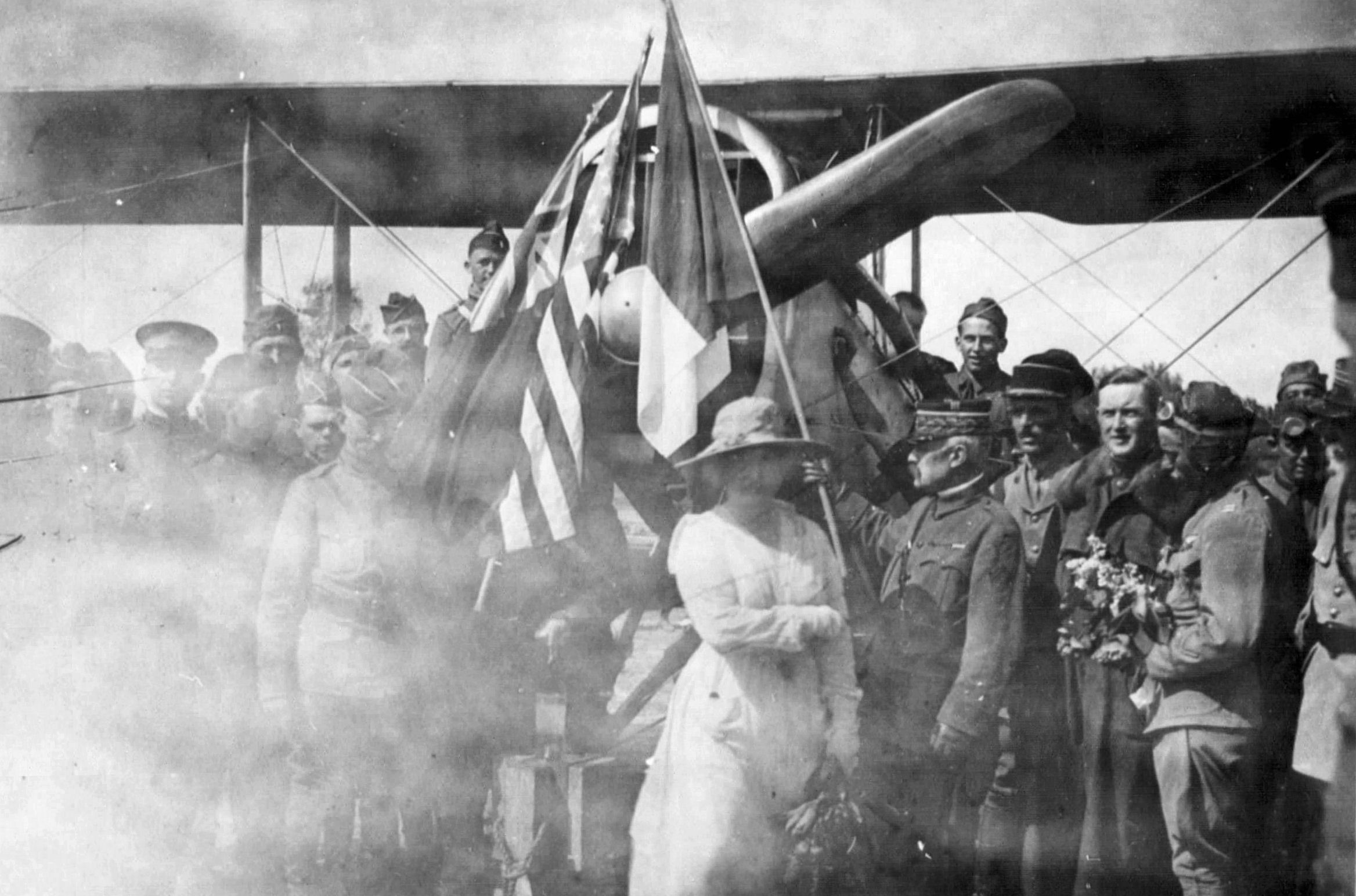
1st completed DH-4, 16 May 1918

Building 1-A was the main facility for DH-4 assembly. Aircraft manufactured in the United States were dis-assembled and crated prior to shipment to East Coast Seaports. There, the crates were loaded onto ships that sailed north to Halifax, Nova Scotia where they were assembled into convoys for the trans-Atlantic crossing. Upon their arrival in European waters, the ships were unloaded either in England or ports in France. The aircraft crates were loaded on flatbed rail cars and routed to Romorantin. This also included the Liberty L-12 aircraft engines, built by Ford, Cadillac, Lincoln, Packard, and General Motors. Upon arrival, the aircraft fuselage and wing components were re-assembled, along with the pilot cockpit instruments, seat and controls. The engines would be installed along with the propeller, fuel tank and the machine guns; bomb racks and other combat equipment.

Experiences in combat resulted in certain modifications to the aircraft and engines be performed before being released for operational use. This increased their effectiveness. Once certified ready for flight, the aircraft would be taken to one of eventually three flying fields where pilots would perform a checkout flight and insure everything was in working order. The assembled aircraft were then flown to the 1st Air Depot at Colombey-les-Belles Aerodrome where they would be assigned to the combat squadrons at the front.

The aircraft assembly and dispatch being the primary mission of Romorantin, secondary work performed at the base was performed by a large Engineering Department. This department included a large storage depot for all hardware fasteners, spare parts, spruce lumber, machine shops, metal workshops, along with armament, radio and camera repair shops for damaged equipment. Beginning in September 1918, a separate facility for Italian Caproni Ca.5 heavy bomber aircraft was established, however the Armistice in November 1918 ended the war before it could be put into production

The Engineering Department also established an aircraft salvage and repair facility in Building B-1 to salvage, reclaim and repair crashed airplanes retrieved from the front. All aircraft engine installation was done by this department, however engines salvaged from crashed aircraft were turned over to the Engine Overhaul Shop. When an aircraft was damaged in combat, or would crash on our side of the front line, a crew would be sent from the 1st Air Depot to dismantle the plane and bring it back to be repaired, if possible. French aircraft were taken to Colombey, while American aircraft were sent to Romorantin. Here if the aircraft could be repaired, it was, or it was placed on a salvage pile where it could be cannibalized for usable parts.

Supply Depot 2 and 3

The other important mission of Romorantin was Supply Depot No 3., which began operations in late March 1918. Initially operated by the 636th Aero Squadron (Supply), it was later joined by the 649th and 667th Aero Squadrons (Supply). The Depot's mission was the storage of aviation supplies, raw materials and equipment received from the United States for distribution to advance depots, air parks, schools and combat squadrons. The Depot stored airplane instruments and accessories; aviation clothing and equipment; portable hangars of canvas and steel; foreign motor forgings and bearings; hardwood lumber for aircraft construction and repair; linen and canvas for wings and fuselage covering; metal fasteners of all kinds; electrical equipment; tools; construction materiel and machinery, steel and radio equipment.

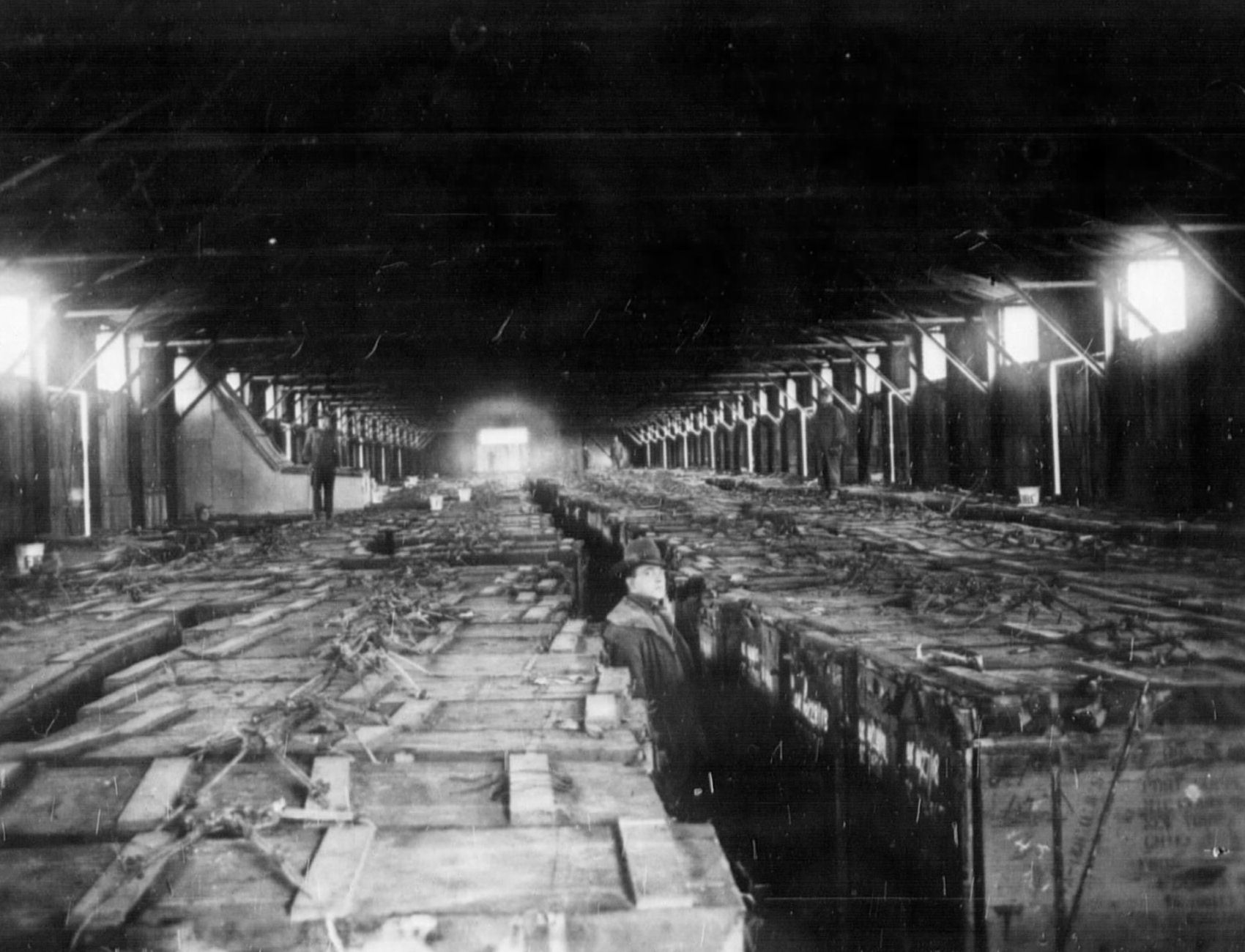
Liberty Engine storage building

Supply Depot No. 2 was the Liberty Engine spare parts depot, and handled every spare part for the engine used by the Air Service in France. Originally part of Supply Depot No 3, it was separated early in June 1918 and managed by the 649th Aero Squadron (Supply). Each Liberty Engine could be operated between 20 and 30 hours in the air before it was needed to be overhauled; therefore, for each aircraft at least 3 or 4 engines were in the process of overhaul or in ready reserve in the field. Besides the Liberty Engines, many LeRhone, Renault, Fiat, Hispano-Suisa, Salmson, Cloget and Clemont engines were received and distributed, along with spare parts for them. A propeller shop for the repair of damaged propellers, along with spares for rapid shipment to combat squadrons was maintained. In addition to the engine parts, Depot No. 2 also managed the storage of over 3,000 Merlin fixed and Lewis flexible mounte machine guns, 10,000 spare magazines each holding 97 rounds of ammunition, over a thousand gunner's belts and various other ordinance equipment.

A scarcity of railroad rolling stock meant that cars arriving at the Depot needed to be unloaded quickly so they could be released for other uses. This activity was carried out 24 hours a day, 7 days a week. Also a shortage of trucks was another problem which meant that each truck leaving the Depot had to have its shipment organized for quick unloading at its destination so it could complete its convoy shipment and return to the Depot for re-loading. During the big offensives of the war during 1918, it was necessary to rush the materiel to the various field depots and combat squadrons at the front. During these periods, men frequently remained at their posts between 12 and 16 hours a day processing requisitions to get the shipments out the same day if possible.

Balloon Department

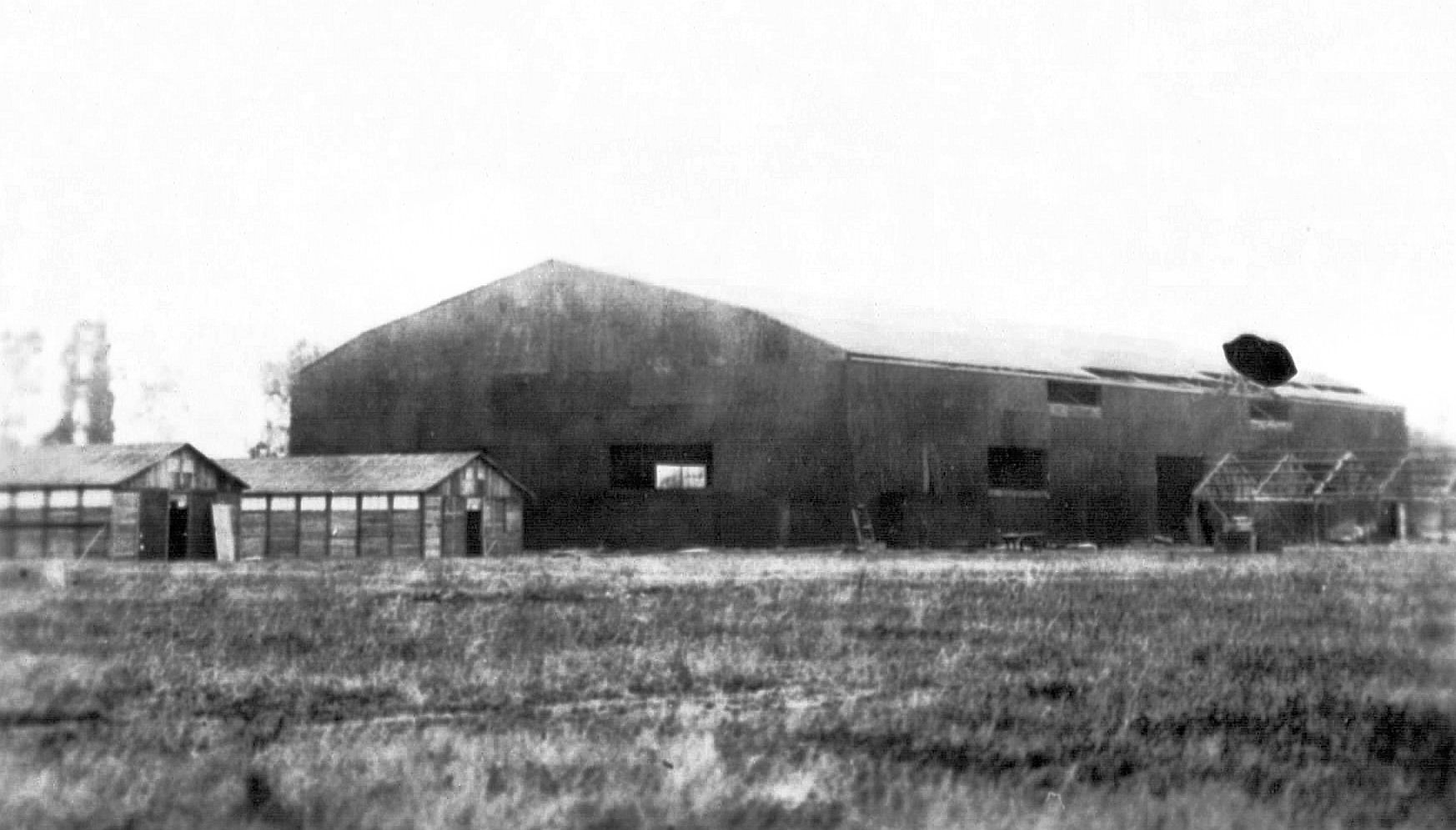
Balloon Hangar

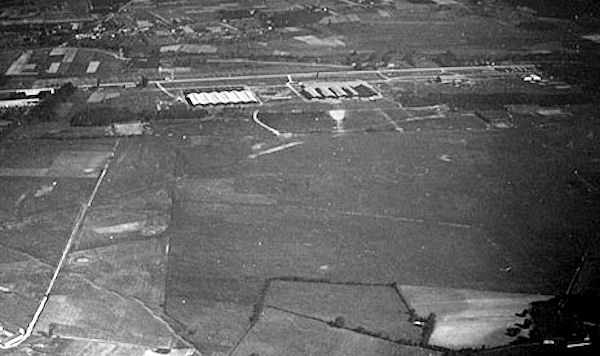
Flying Field #1

The Balloon Department was responsible for providing all necessary materiel to support the Observation Balloon Companies at the front. Caquot Observation balloons, manufactured both in France as well as the United States were received at Romorantin and rigged for combat use. Once prepared and inspected for service they were trucked to the combat Companies. This also included parachutes for the observers. A large amount of cloth, adhesive tape, rubberised glue, and silk, roes and cords were kept on hand for repairs. The Balloon Repair Depot received damaged Balloons and was equipped with sewing machines, bloweres, long tables, benches canvas, silk, wicker and the equipment needed to repair and ship back to the field balloons quickly.

Transportation Department

The Transportation Department was responsible for the overhauling, repair and shipment of all motor vehicles used by the Air Service in France. The 803d Aero Squadron (Transportation) was responsible for furnishing vehicle spare parts and supplies to all Air Service units, bringing vehicles from the ports, holding them in reserve, and delivering them to organizations as required. It also recovered damaged vehicles which it brought back to Romorantin for repair or salvage. By August 1918, this mission was taken over by the Air Service Motor Transportation Corps which continued the work of the 803d. The MTC established a depot for foreign-made trucks and supplies. A school for vehicle mechanics was also established at Romorantin.

Medical Department

Three large hospitals were established at Romorantin, providing medical treatment for casualties incurred in combat. It also treated personnel who were injured in the course of their duties or off-duty recreational activities, those who required dental work, and those who contracted Venereal Diseases.

==== Post Armistice use ====
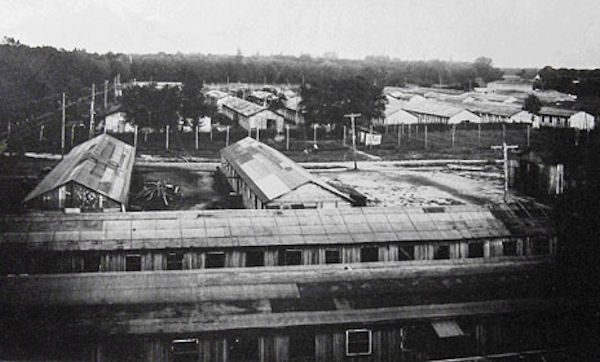
Abandoned buildings at Romorantin, Summer, 1919

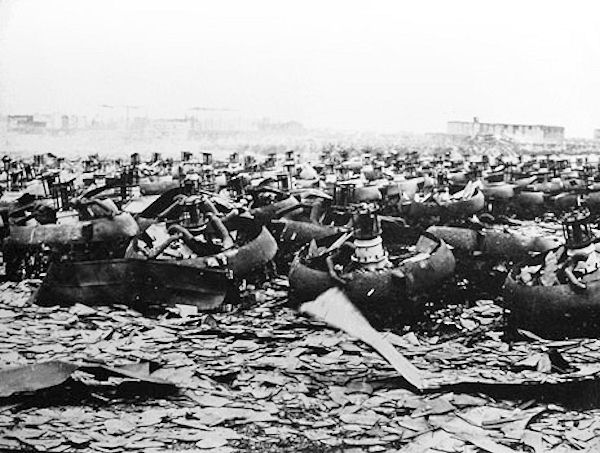
Scrap pile of aircraft engines, paperwork and other abandoned materiel at Romorantin, summer, 1919

With the end of combat in November 1918, the mission of Romorantin was wound down. The depot began receiving large numbers of DH-4 Combat Aircraft from the 1st Air Depot that were used in combat. The aircraft, basically having no further use, were disassembled, and their engines either piled in storage or sold. Also captured German aircraft, abandoned on airfields in France, were sent to Romorantin for various testing and then dis-assembly for shipment back to the United States.

When the Air Service in France was ordered demobilized in April 1919, the Americans at Romorantin turned the facility over to the French Government, leaving warehouses full of supplies, equipment, tools dis-assembled aircraft and trucks to the care of the French, abandoning almost everything in place.

The French, in turn, contracted with a private company for the sale and disposal of the facility for liquidation. Sales were held for clothing, hardware and small tools. Entire buildings were sold to buyers and everything inside it. In the countryside, many farms found themselves with former American buildings being used for various purposes. A group of 200 guards were hired to protect the facility, however many people looted and ransacked the deserted buildings still filled with goods. Fortunes were made at the expense of the public good.

=== Inter-war period ===
In the 1920s, a small portion of the former American depot (137 ha (340 acres)) was used as Aviation General Store # 3. It became an aircraft equipment and training center. It was later designated as BA 304, Camp Blume. It grew during the 1920s and 1930s and became a major employer in the region, with the salaries of its civilian employees being 30% higher than the private sector.

=== World War II ===
During the Battle of France in 1940, Camp Blume was attacked by 18 bombers of the German Luftwaffe on 25 May. The entire facility was severely damaged. The defenses of the base at the time consisted of only three aircraft, flown by Polish pilots who gave chase. Later that night, the airfield was again attacked and the Luftwaffe again dropped bombs on the field. On 5 June, in the beginning of the afternoon, 17 Luftwaffe bombers again bombed the facility and the main warehouse was evacuated. On the morning of 19 June the German Army entered Romorantin and seized control of the airfield and facilities.

With the Armistice with Germany on 22 June, the airfield was placed in control of the Luftwaffe, the airfield being renamed Feldluftpark Romorantin. Some of the former civilian employees of Camp Blume were rehired for the rehabilitation of the airfield and the construction of hangars for aircraft.

An unidentified Luftwaffe unit, flying Heinkel He 111 bombers used Romorantin in the fall of 1940 flying bombing missions over England. Many do not return During the occupation, known Luftwaffe units assigned to the airfield were:

- Fluganwärter-Bataillon V (July–November 1942)
- Flieger-Regiment 91 (26 February-2 September 1944)
- 1 Staffle Jagdgeschwader 105 (1./JG105) (21 March-1 August 1944) Fw 190

Romorantin was attacked by twenty-one American Eighth Air Force B-24 Liberators (Mission 295) on 10 April 1944, destroying most of 1./JG105 and its facilities. One can still see bomb craters on the airfield. The Germans abandoned the airfield in the last days of August 1944 and the Free French Army moved into the area on 2 September.

=== Subsequent use ===
The French Air Force has used Romorantin as a storage depot and the Technical Documentation Center of Air Force (CDTAA) since 15 December 1944. In 1973, CVA 602, the Center Gliding Force was created which trains French Glider Pilots. Today, the depot is located in the site of the main World War I American 1-A and 1-B DH-4 assembly buildings and primarily supports the Dassault Rafale F1 Advanced Technology Fighter.

The former American Flying Field #1 remains a grass field, and is used by the glider training school.

== See also ==
- List of Air Service American Expeditionary Force aerodromes in France
