= La Marolle-en-Sologne =

- Commune
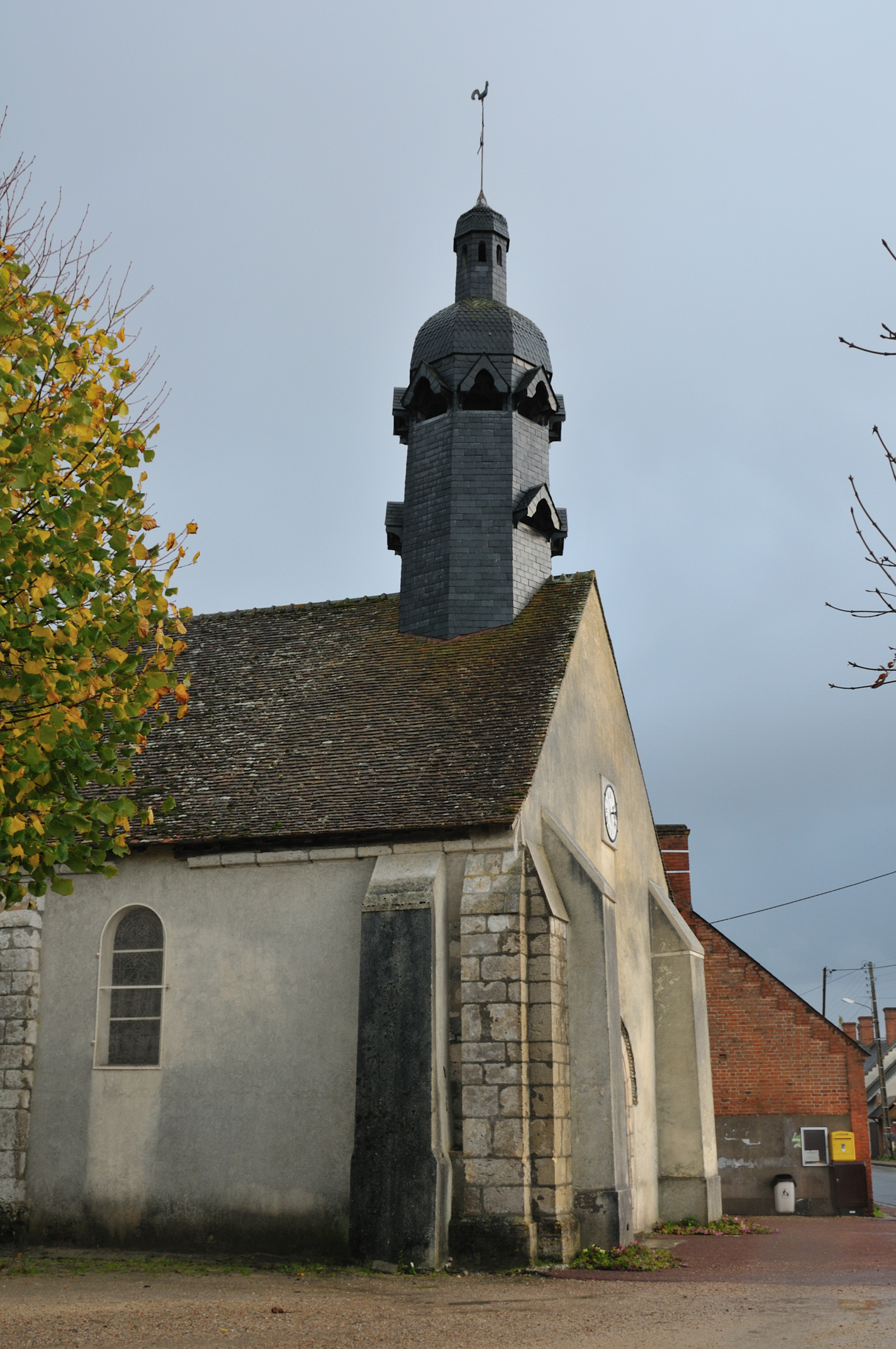
- Church of Saint-Pierre
- Location of La Marolle-en-Sologne
- Location within France Location within Centre-Val de Loire
- Coordinates: 47°35′06″N 1°46′48″E
- Country: France
- Region: Centre-Val de Loire
- Department: Loir-et-Cher
- Arrondissement: Romorantin-Lanthenay
- Canton: Chambord
- Intercommunality: La Sologne des étangs

Government
  - Mayor (2020–2026): Éric Fassot
- Area^{1}: 25.24 km^{2} (9.75 sq mi)
- Elevation: 117 m (384 ft)
- Highest elevation: 136 m (446 ft)
- Lowest elevation: 97 m (318 ft)
- Population (2023): 379
  - Density: 15.0/km^{2} (38.9/sq mi)
- Time zone: UTC+01:00 (CET)
  - Summer (DST): UTC+02:00 (CEST)
- INSEE/Postal code: 41127 /41210
- ^{1} French Land Register data, which excludes lakes, ponds, glaciers > 1 km^{2} (0.386 sq mi or 247 acres) and river estuaries.

La Marolle-en-Sologne (French pronunciation: [la maʁɔl ɑ̃ sɔlɔɲ], literally La Marolle in Sologne), commonly known as La Marolle, is a town and commune in the Loir-et-Cher department in the administrative region of Centre-Val de Loire, France.

The town is located in the natural region of Sologne.

== Population ==
Historical population
Year	Pop.	±% p.a.
1968	460	—
1975	429	−0.99%
1982	428	−0.03%
1990	439	+0.32%
1999	355	−2.33%
2007	384	+0.99%
2012	399	+0.77%
2017	344	−2.92%
2023	379	+1.63%
Source: INSEE

== See also ==
- Communes of the Loir-et-Cher department
