= Gy-en-Sologne =

- Commune
- Location of Gy-en-Sologne
- Location within France Location within Centre-Val de Loire
- Coordinates: 47°20′45″N 1°35′03″E
- Country: France
- Region: Centre-Val de Loire
- Department: Loir-et-Cher
- Arrondissement: Romorantin-Lanthenay
- Canton: Selles-sur-Cher
- Intercommunality: Val-de-Cher-Controis

Government
  - Mayor (2020–2026): Franck Baillieul
- Area^{1}: 35.92 km^{2} (13.87 sq mi)
- Elevation: 90 m (300 ft)
- Highest elevation: 111 m (364 ft)
- Lowest elevation: 77 m (253 ft)
- Population (2023): 475
  - Density: 13.2/km^{2} (34.2/sq mi)
- Time zone: UTC+01:00 (CET)
  - Summer (DST): UTC+02:00 (CEST)
- INSEE/Postal code: 41099 /41230
- ^{1} French Land Register data, which excludes lakes, ponds, glaciers > 1 km^{2} (0.386 sq mi or 247 acres) and river estuaries.

Gy-en-Sologne (French pronunciation: [ʒi ɑ̃ sɔlɔɲ], lit. 'Gy in Sologne') is a commune in the Loir-et-Cher department of central France.

== Population ==
Historical population
Year	Pop.	±% p.a.
1968	513	—
1975	509	−0.11%
1982	444	−1.93%
1990	419	−0.72%
1999	449	+0.77%
2007	513	+1.68%
2012	511	−0.08%
2017	499	−0.47%
2023	475	−0.82%
Source: INSEE

== See also ==
- Communes of the Loir-et-Cher department
