= Langon =

Langon may refer to:

- Langon, Gironde, a commune in the Gironde department, France
- Langon, Ille-et-Vilaine, a commune in the Ille-et-Vilaine department, France
- Langon, Loir-et-Cher, a commune in the Loir-et-Cher department, France
- Långön, an island in the Luleå archipelago in the Swedish part of the Bothnian Bay
- Le Langon
- Arrondissement of Langon

== Other uses ==
- Langon (grape), another name for the wine grape Merlot
- Fargues de Langon
