= Arrondissement of Romorantin-Lanthenay =

Coordinates: 47°21′N 1°44′E

Romorantin-Lanthenay
- Arrondissement
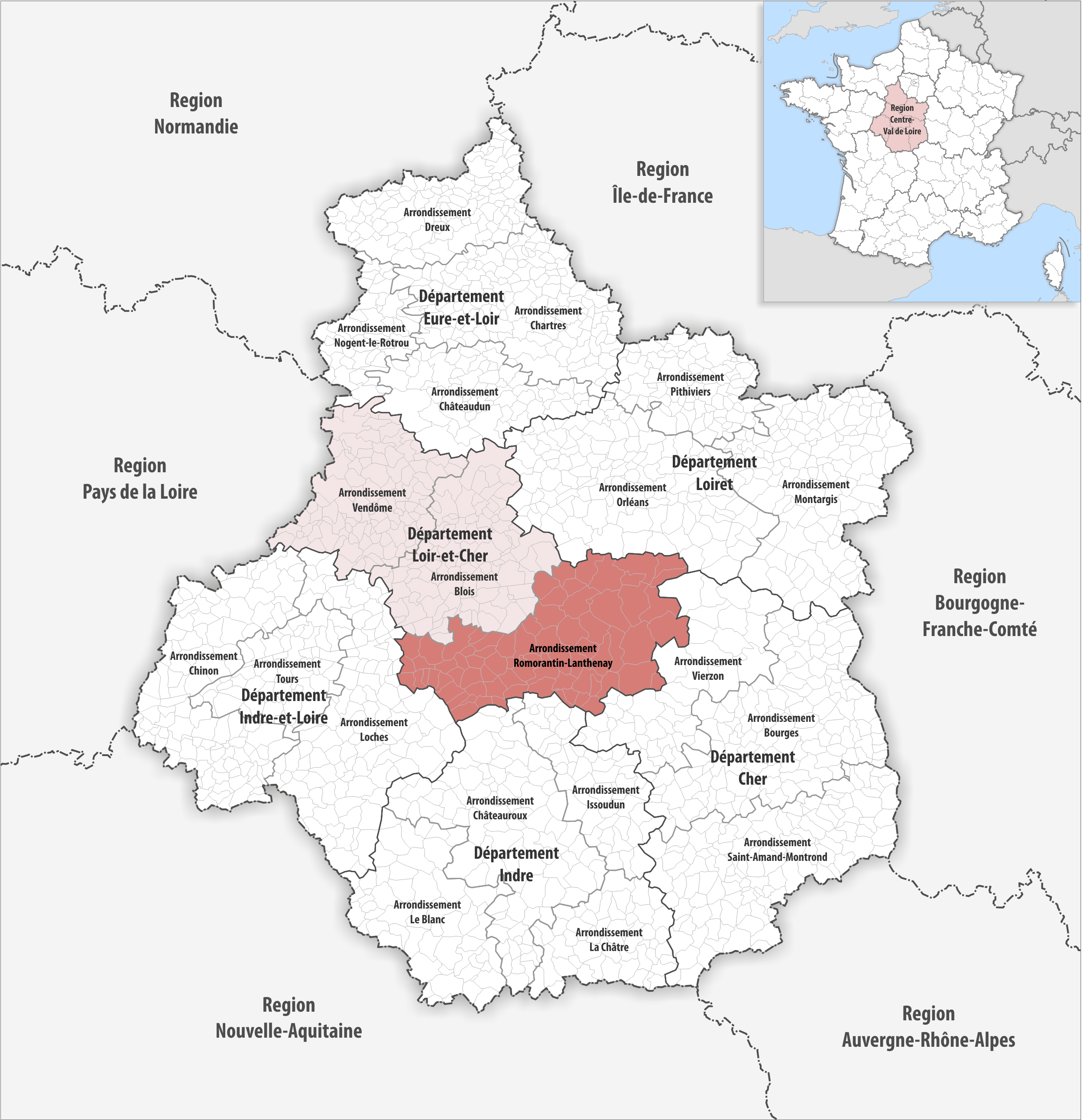
- Location within the region Centre-Val de Loire
- Country: France
- Region: Centre-Val de Loire
- Department: Loir-et-Cher
- No. of communes: {{{nbcomm}}}
- Area: 2,670.9 km^{2} (1,031.2 sq mi)
- Population (2023): 109,789
  - Density: 41.106/km^{2} (106.46/sq mi)
- INSEE code: 413

The arrondissement of Romorantin-Lanthenay is an arrondissement of France in the Loir-et-Cher department, in the Centre-Val de Loire region. It has 74 communes. Its population is 110,000 (2021), and its area is 2,670.9 km^{2} (1,031.2 sq mi).

== Composition ==
The communes of the arrondissement of Romorantin-Lanthenay are:

1. Angé (41002)
2. Billy (41016)
3. Chaon (41036)
4. La Chapelle-Montmartin (41038)
5. Châteauvieux (41042)
6. Châtillon-sur-Cher (41043)
7. Châtres-sur-Cher (41044)
8. Chaumont-sur-Tharonne (41046)
9. Chémery (41049)
10. Chissay-en-Touraine (41051)
11. Choussy (41054)
12. Le Controis-en-Sologne (41059)
13. Couddes (41062)
14. Couffy (41063)
15. Courmemin (41068)
16. Dhuizon (41074)
17. Faverolles-sur-Cher (41080)
18. La Ferté-Beauharnais (41083)
19. La Ferté-Imbault (41084)
20. Fresnes (41094)
21. Gièvres (41097)
22. Gy-en-Sologne (41099)
23. Lamotte-Beuvron (41106)
24. Langon-sur-Cher (41110)
25. Lassay-sur-Croisne (41112)
26. Loreux (41118)
27. Maray (41122)
28. Marcilly-en-Gault (41125)
29. Mareuil-sur-Cher (41126)
30. La Marolle-en-Sologne (41127)
31. Méhers (41132)
32. Mennetou-sur-Cher (41135)
33. Meusnes (41139)
34. Millançay (41140)
35. Monthou-sur-Cher (41146)
36. Montrichard-Val-de-Cher (41151)
37. Montrieux-en-Sologne (41152)
38. Mur-de-Sologne (41157)
39. Neung-sur-Beuvron (41159)
40. Nouan-le-Fuzelier (41161)
41. Noyers-sur-Cher (41164)
42. Oisly (41166)
43. Orçay (41168)
44. Pierrefitte-sur-Sauldre (41176)
45. Pontlevoy (41180)
46. Pouillé (41181)
47. Pruniers-en-Sologne (41185)
48. Romorantin-Lanthenay (41194)
49. Rougeou (41195)
50. Saint-Aignan (41198)
51. Saint-Georges-sur-Cher (41211)
52. Saint-Julien-de-Chédon (41217)
53. Saint-Julien-sur-Cher (41218)
54. Saint-Loup (41222)
55. Saint-Romain-sur-Cher (41229)
56. Saint-Viâtre (41231)
57. Salbris (41232)
58. Sassay (41237)
59. Seigy (41239)
60. Selles-Saint-Denis (41241)
61. Selles-sur-Cher (41242)
62. Soings-en-Sologne (41247)
63. Souesmes (41249)
64. Souvigny-en-Sologne (41251)
65. Theillay (41256)
66. Thésée (41258)
67. Vallières-les-Grandes (41267)
68. Veilleins (41268)
69. Vernou-en-Sologne (41271)
70. Villefranche-sur-Cher (41280)
71. Villeherviers (41282)
72. Villeny (41285)
73. Vouzon (41296)
74. Yvoy-le-Marron (41297)

== History ==
The arrondissement of Romorantin-Lanthenay was created in 1800, disbanded in 1926 and restored in 1943. In 2007 it absorbed the canton of Saint-Aignan from the arrondissement of Blois. At the January 2017 reorganisation of the arrondissements of Loir-et-Cher, it gained 17 communes from the arrondissement of Blois, and it lost three communes to the arrondissement of Blois. In January 2019 it gained the commune Courmemin from the arrondissement of Blois.

As a result of the reorganisation of the cantons of France which came into effect in 2015, the borders of the cantons are no longer related to the borders of the arrondissements. The cantons of the arrondissement of Romorantin-Lanthenay were, as of January 2015:

1. Lamotte-Beuvron
2. Mennetou-sur-Cher
3. Neung-sur-Beuvron
4. Romorantin-Lanthenay-Nord
5. Romorantin-Lanthenay-Sud
6. Saint-Aignan
7. Salbris
8. Selles-sur-Cher
