= Mur-de-Sologne =

- Commune
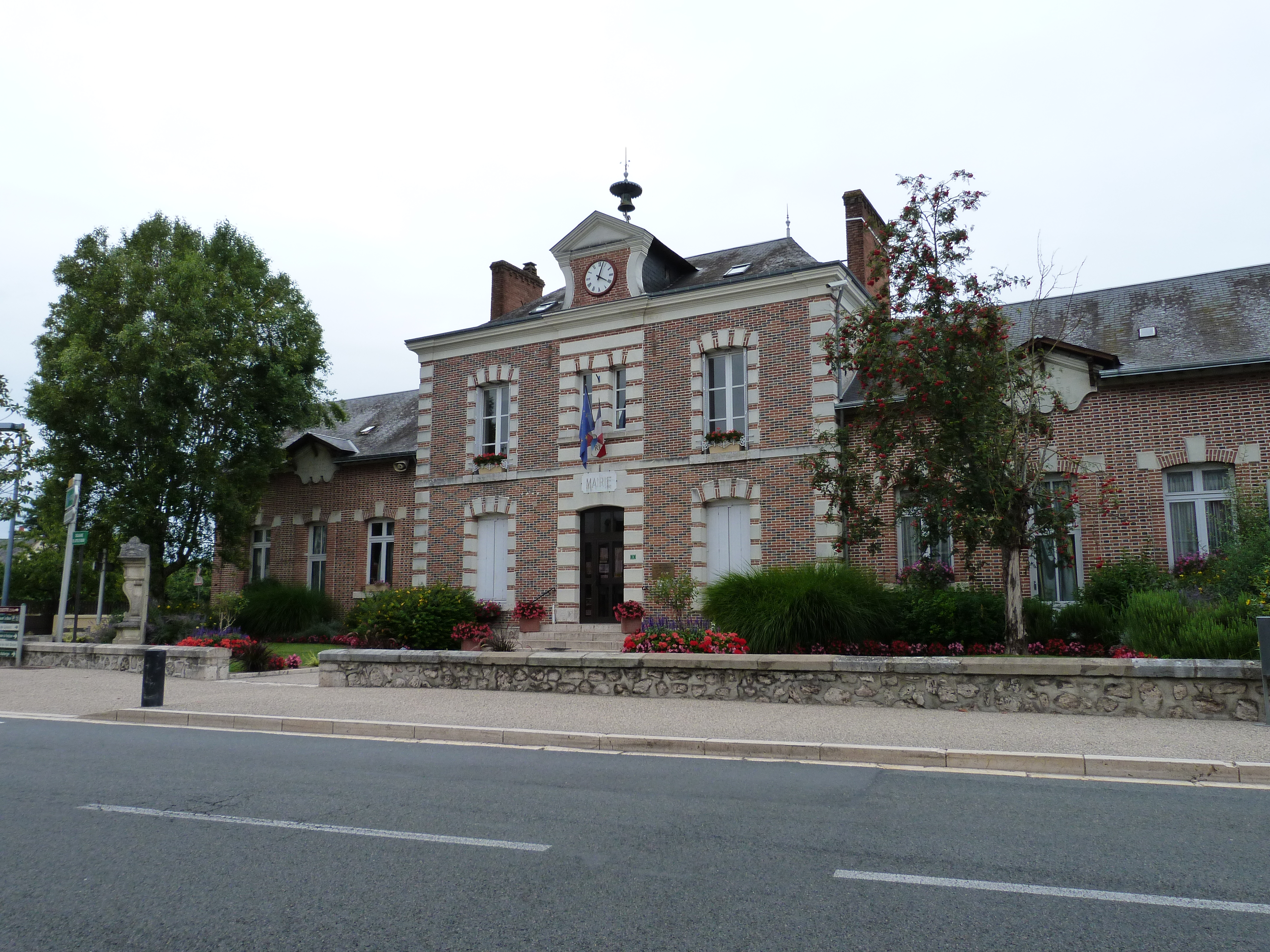
- Town hall
- Location of Mur-de-Sologne
- Location within France Location within Centre-Val de Loire
- Coordinates: 47°24′48″N 1°36′33″E
- Country: France
- Region: Centre-Val de Loire
- Department: Loir-et-Cher
- Arrondissement: Romorantin-Lanthenay
- Canton: Selles-sur-Cher

Government
  - Mayor (2022–2026): Yves Villanueva
- Area^{1}: 50.5 km^{2} (19.5 sq mi)
- Elevation: 113 m (371 ft)
- Highest elevation: 131 m (430 ft)
- Lowest elevation: 88 m (289 ft)
- Population (2023): 1,518
  - Density: 30.1/km^{2} (77.9/sq mi)
- Time zone: UTC+01:00 (CET)
  - Summer (DST): UTC+02:00 (CEST)
- INSEE/Postal code: 41157 /41230
- ^{1} French Land Register data, which excludes lakes, ponds, glaciers > 1 km^{2} (0.386 sq mi or 247 acres) and river estuaries.

Mur-de-Sologne (French pronunciation: [myʁ də sɔlɔɲ], literally Mur of Sologne) is a commune in the Loir-et-Cher department of central France.

== Population ==
Historical population
Year	Pop.	±% p.a.
1968	925	—
1975	1,017	+1.36%
1982	1,102	+1.15%
1990	1,054	−0.56%
1999	1,197	+1.42%
2007	1,305	+1.09%
2012	1,496	+2.77%
2017	1,519	+0.31%
2023	1,518	−0.01%
Source: INSEE

== See also ==
- Communes of the Loir-et-Cher department
