= Montrieux-en-Sologne =

- Commune
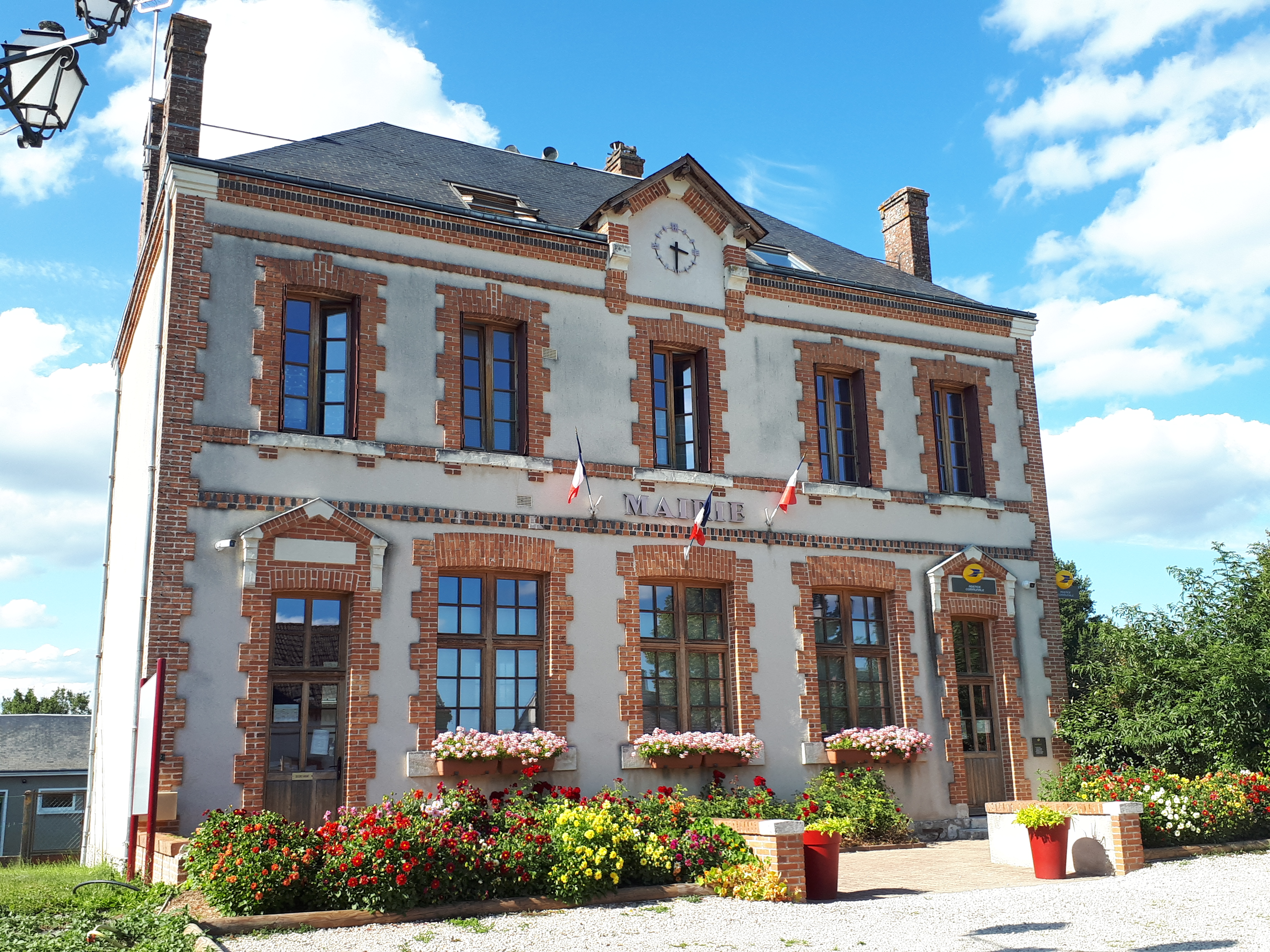
- Town hall
- Location of Montrieux-en-Sologne
- Location within France Location within Centre-Val de Loire
- Coordinates: 47°33′15″N 1°43′28″E
- Country: France
- Region: Centre-Val de Loire
- Department: Loir-et-Cher
- Arrondissement: Romorantin-Lanthenay
- Canton: Chambord
- Intercommunality: Sologne des étangs

Government
  - Mayor (2020–2026): Eric Morand
- Area^{1}: 34.11 km^{2} (13.17 sq mi)
- Elevation: 112 m (367 ft)
- Highest elevation: 118 m (387 ft)
- Lowest elevation: 80 m (260 ft)
- Population (2023): 638
  - Density: 18.7/km^{2} (48.4/sq mi)
- Time zone: UTC+01:00 (CET)
  - Summer (DST): UTC+02:00 (CEST)
- INSEE/Postal code: 41152 /41210
- ^{1} French Land Register data, which excludes lakes, ponds, glaciers > 1 km^{2} (0.386 sq mi or 247 acres) and river estuaries.

Montrieux-en-Sologne (French pronunciation: [mɔ̃tʁijø ɑ̃ sɔlɔɲ], literally Montrieux in Sologne) is a commune and town in the French department of Loir-et-Cher, Centre-Val de Loire, France.

== Population ==
Historical population
Year	Pop.	±% p.a.
1968	651	—
1975	550	−2.38%
1982	481	−1.90%
1990	459	−0.58%
1999	524	+1.48%
2007	610	+1.92%
2012	655	+1.43%
2017	651	−0.12%
2023	638	−0.34%
Source: INSEE

== See also ==
- Communes of the Loir-et-Cher department
