= Châtres-sur-Cher =

- Commune
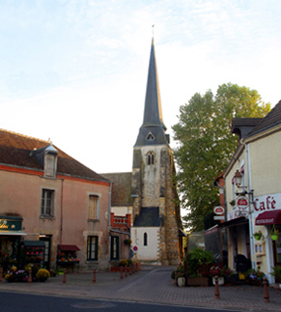

- Coat of arms
- Location of Châtres-sur-Cher
- Location within France Location within Centre-Val de Loire
- Coordinates: 47°15′57″N 1°54′25″E
- Country: France
- Region: Centre-Val de Loire
- Department: Loir-et-Cher
- Arrondissement: Romorantin-Lanthenay
- Canton: Selles-sur-Cher

Government
  - Mayor (2024–2026): Claude de Carfort
- Area^{1}: 35.33 km^{2} (13.64 sq mi)
- Elevation: 103 m (338 ft)
- Highest elevation: 157 m (515 ft)
- Lowest elevation: 87 m (285 ft)
- Population (2023): 1,132
  - Density: 32.04/km^{2} (82.99/sq mi)
- Time zone: UTC+01:00 (CET)
  - Summer (DST): UTC+02:00 (CEST)
- INSEE/Postal code: 41044 /41320
- ^{1} French Land Register data, which excludes lakes, ponds, glaciers > 1 km^{2} (0.386 sq mi or 247 acres) and river estuaries.

Châtres-sur-Cher (French pronunciation: [ʃatʁ syʁ ʃɛʁ], literally Châtres on Cher) is a commune in the Loir-et-Cher department, central France.

== Geography ==
The Rère forms the commune's northern border. The Cher forms part of the commune's southern border.

== Population ==
Historical population
Year	Pop.	±% p.a.
1968	1,059	—
1975	1,009	−0.69%
1982	1,110	+1.37%
1990	1,074	−0.41%
1999	1,129	+0.56%
2007	1,075	−0.61%
2012	1,106	+0.57%
2017	1,097	−0.16%
2023	1,132	+0.52%
Source: INSEE

== See also ==
- Communes of the Loir-et-Cher department
