= Saint-Loup, Loir-et-Cher =

Saint-Loup
- Commune
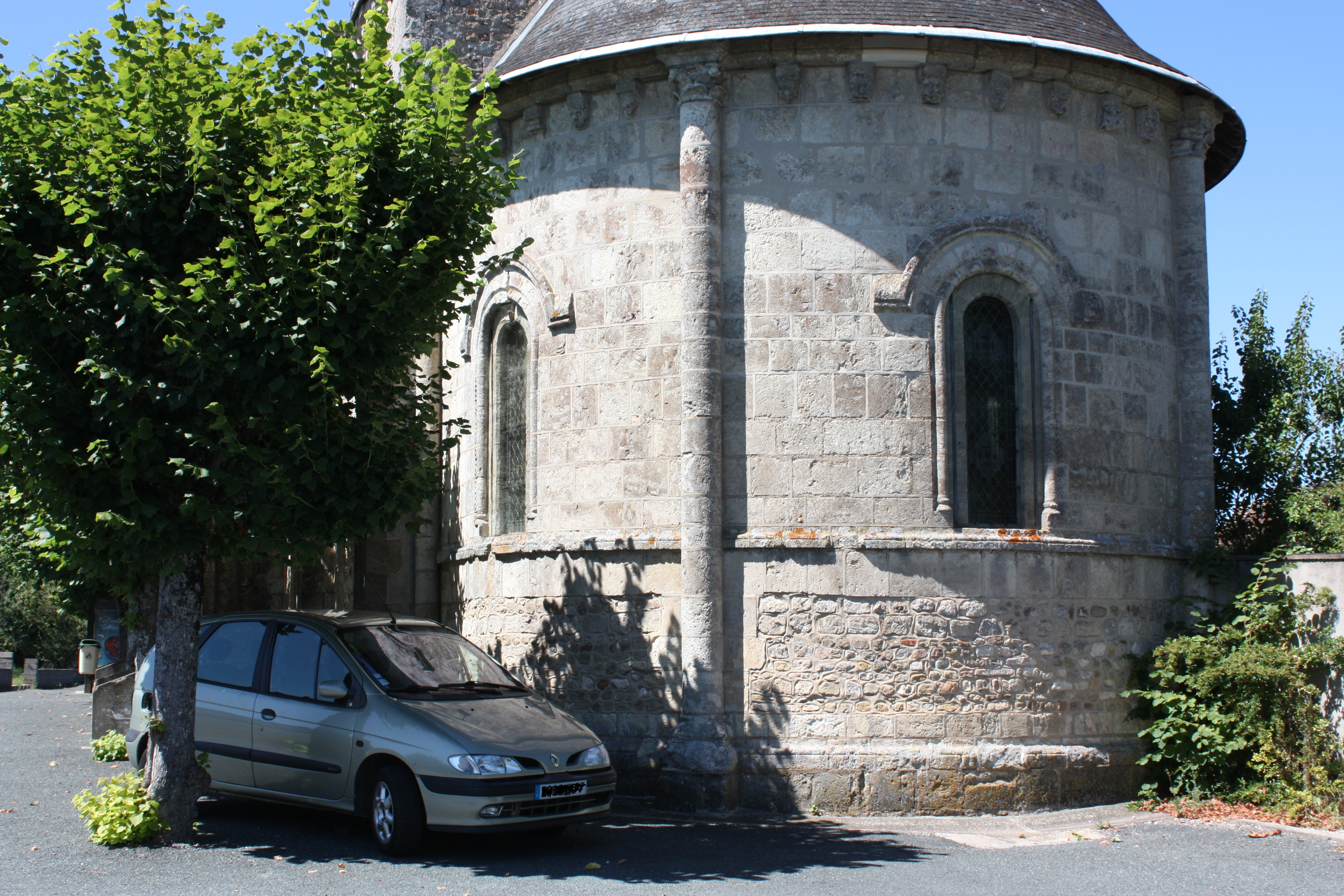
- Location of Saint-Loup
- Location within France Location within Centre-Val de Loire
- Coordinates: 47°15′58″N 1°50′25″E
- Country: France
- Region: Centre-Val de Loire
- Department: Loir-et-Cher
- Arrondissement: Romorantin-Lanthenay
- Canton: Selles-sur-Cher

Government
  - Mayor (2020–2026): Pierre Barbé
- Area^{1}: 14.7 km^{2} (5.7 sq mi)
- Elevation: 120 m (390 ft)
- Highest elevation: 151 m (495 ft)
- Lowest elevation: 82 m (269 ft)
- Population (2023): 354
  - Density: 24.1/km^{2} (62.4/sq mi)
- Time zone: UTC+01:00 (CET)
  - Summer (DST): UTC+02:00 (CEST)
- INSEE/Postal code: 41222 /41320
- ^{1} French Land Register data, which excludes lakes, ponds, glaciers > 1 km^{2} (0.386 sq mi or 247 acres) and river estuaries.

Saint-Loup (French pronunciation: [sɛ̃ lu]) is a commune in the Loir-et-Cher department in central France.

== Population ==
Historical population
Year	Pop.	±% p.a.
1968	230	—
1975	196	−2.26%
1982	231	+2.37%
1990	259	+1.44%
1999	298	+1.57%
2007	325	+1.09%
2012	369	+2.57%
2017	375	+0.32%
2023	354	−0.96%
Source: INSEE

== See also ==
- Communes of the Loir-et-Cher department
