= Pruniers-en-Sologne =

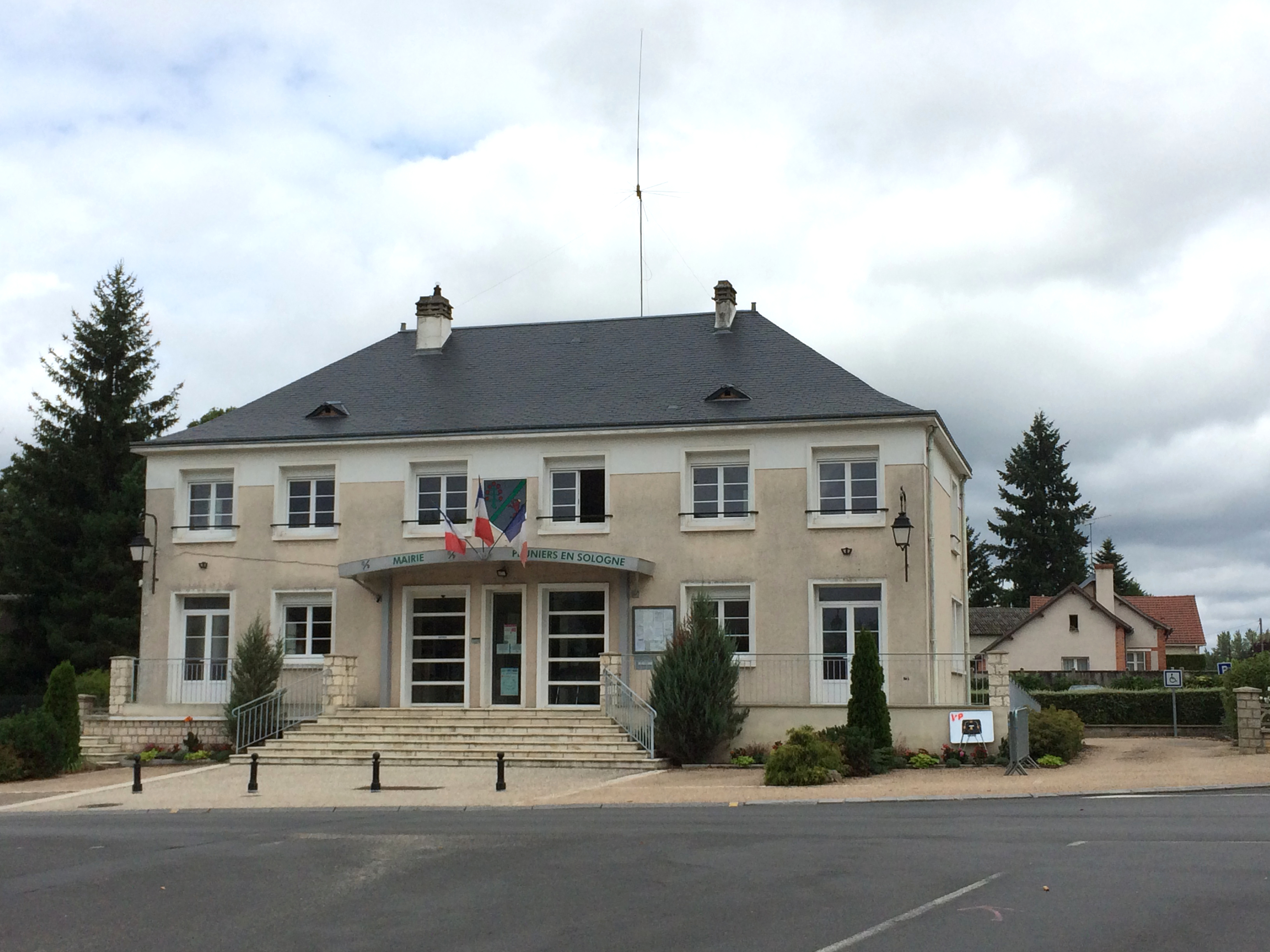
- Town hall

- Coat of arms
- Location of Pruniers-en-Sologne
- Location within France Location within Centre-Val de Loire
- Coordinates: 47°19′25″N 1°40′19″E
- Country: France
- Region: Centre-Val de Loire
- Department: Loir-et-Cher
- Arrondissement: Romorantin-Lanthenay
- Canton: Selles-sur-Cher
- Intercommunality: Romorantinais et Monestois

Government
  - Mayor (2020–2026): Aurélien Bertrand
- Area^{1}: 43.84 km^{2} (16.93 sq mi)
- Highest elevation: 111 m (364 ft)
- Lowest elevation: 74 m (243 ft)
- Population (2023): 2,245
  - Density: 51.21/km^{2} (132.6/sq mi)
- Time zone: UTC+01:00 (CET)
  - Summer (DST): UTC+02:00 (CEST)
- INSEE/Postal code: 41185 /41200
- ^{1} French Land Register data, which excludes lakes, ponds, glaciers > 1 km^{2} (0.386 sq mi or 247 acres) and river estuaries.

Pruniers-en-Sologne (French pronunciation: [pʁynje ɑ̃ sɔlɔɲ], literally Pruniers in Sologne) is a commune and town in the Loir-et-Cher department in the administrative region of Centre-Val de Loire, France.

== Population ==
Historical population

Year	Pop.	±% p.a.
1793	531	—
1821	656	+0.76%
1846	608	−0.30%
1872	823	+1.17%
1901	1,013	+0.72%
1926	1,031	+0.07%
1946	963	−0.34%
1962	988	+0.16%
1968	890	−1.73%

Year	Pop.	±% p.a.
1975	1,102	+3.10%
1982	1,556	+5.05%
1990	1,992	+3.14%
1999	2,128	+0.74%
2007	2,291	+0.93%
2012	2,329	+0.33%
2017	2,388	+0.50%
2023	2,245	−1.02%

Source: EHESS and INSEE (1968-2023)

== See also ==
- Communes of the Loir-et-Cher department
- Romorantin - Pruniers Air Detachment
