= Saint-Julien-sur-Cher =

- Commune
- Location of Saint-Julien-sur-Cher
- Location within France Location within Centre-Val de Loire
- Coordinates: 47°16′58″N 1°46′29″E
- Country: France
- Region: Centre-Val de Loire
- Department: Loir-et-Cher
- Arrondissement: Romorantin-Lanthenay
- Canton: Selles-sur-Cher

Government
  - Mayor (2020–2026): Romain Sourioux
- Area^{1}: 15.99 km^{2} (6.17 sq mi)
- Elevation: 100 m (330 ft)
- Highest elevation: 152 m (499 ft)
- Lowest elevation: 82 m (269 ft)
- Population (2023): 742
  - Density: 46.4/km^{2} (120/sq mi)
- Time zone: UTC+01:00 (CET)
  - Summer (DST): UTC+02:00 (CEST)
- INSEE/Postal code: 41218 /41320
- ^{1} French Land Register data, which excludes lakes, ponds, glaciers > 1 km^{2} (0.386 sq mi or 247 acres) and river estuaries.

Saint-Julien-sur-Cher (French pronunciation: [sɛ̃ ʒyljɛ̃ syʁ ʃɛʁ], literally Saint-Julien on Cher) is a commune in the Loir-et-Cher department in central France.

== Population ==
Historical population
| Year | Pop. | ±% p.a. |
|---|---|---|
| 1968 | 403 | — |
| 1975 | 447 | +1.49% |
| 1982 | 553 | +3.09% |
| 1990 | 627 | +1.58% |
| 1999 | 663 | +0.62% |
| 2007 | 746 | +1.49% |
| 2012 | 760 | +0.37% |
| 2017 | 768 | +0.21% |
| 2023 | 742 | −0.57% |
Source: INSEE

== See also ==
- Communes of the Loir-et-Cher department
