= Theillay =

- Commune
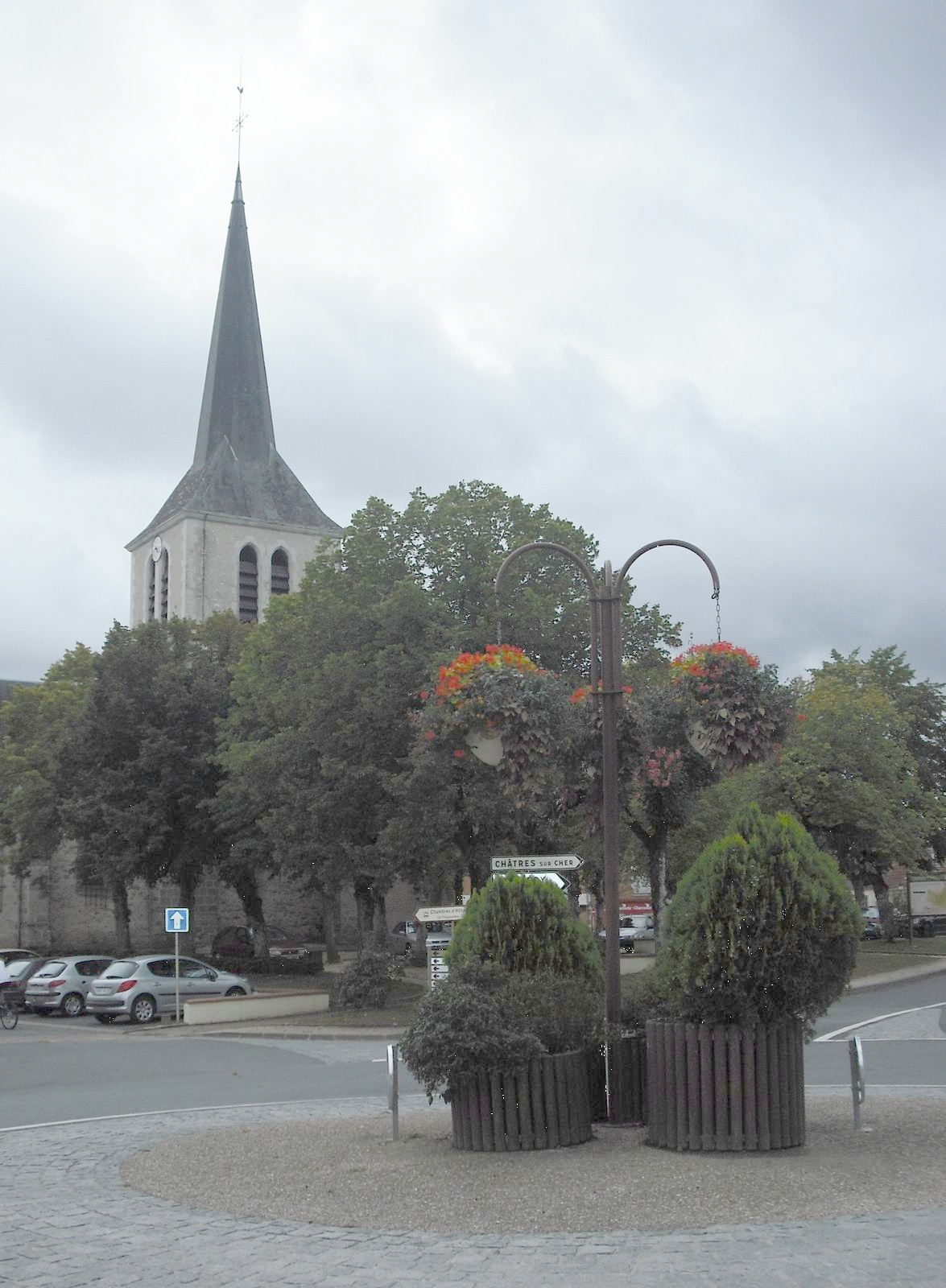
- Church of Saint-Sulpice

- Coat of arms
- Location of Theillay
- Location within France Location within Centre-Val de Loire
- Coordinates: 47°18′52″N 2°02′28″E
- Country: France
- Region: Centre-Val de Loire
- Department: Loir-et-Cher
- Arrondissement: Romorantin-Lanthenay
- Canton: Selles-sur-Cher
- Intercommunality: Sologne des rivières

Government
  - Mayor (2020–2026): Gérard Chopin
- Area^{1}: 96.38 km^{2} (37.21 sq mi)
- Highest elevation: 168 m (551 ft)
- Lowest elevation: 96 m (315 ft)
- Population (2023): 1,258
  - Density: 13.05/km^{2} (33.81/sq mi)
- Time zone: UTC+01:00 (CET)
  - Summer (DST): UTC+02:00 (CEST)
- INSEE/Postal code: 41256 /41300
- ^{1} French Land Register data, which excludes lakes, ponds, glaciers > 1 km^{2} (0.386 sq mi or 247 acres) and river estuaries.

Theillay (French pronunciation: [tɛjɛ]) is a commune of the Loir-et-Cher department in central France.

== Geography ==
The Rère flows west through the northern part of the commune.

== Population ==
Historical population
Year	Pop.	±% p.a.
1968	1,288	—
1975	1,198	−1.03%
1982	1,245	+0.55%
1990	1,354	+1.05%
1999	1,293	−0.51%
2007	1,263	−0.29%
2012	1,313	+0.78%
2017	1,260	−0.82%
2023	1,258	−0.03%
Source: INSEE

== See also ==
- Communes of the Loir-et-Cher department
