= Courmemin =

- Commune
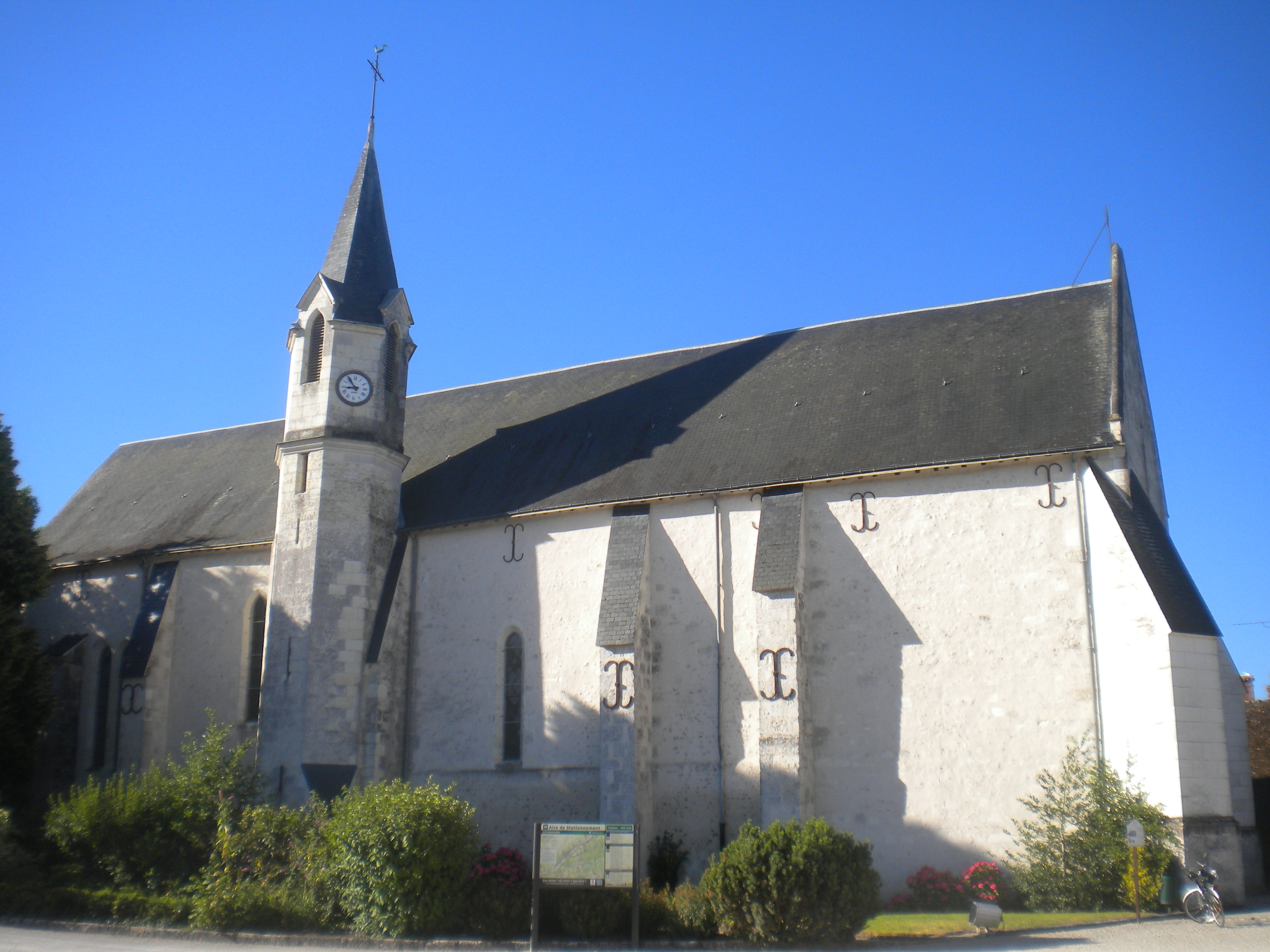
- Location of Courmemin
- Location within France Location within Centre-Val de Loire
- Coordinates: 47°28′22″N 1°37′41″E
- Country: France
- Region: Centre-Val de Loire
- Department: Loir-et-Cher
- Arrondissement: Romorantin-Lanthenay
- Canton: Chambord
- Intercommunality: Romorantinais et Monestois

Government
  - Mayor (2020–2026): Gilles Chantier
- Area^{1}: 24.17 km^{2} (9.33 sq mi)
- Elevation: 110 m (360 ft)
- Highest elevation: 124 m (407 ft)
- Lowest elevation: 84 m (276 ft)
- Population (2023): 502
  - Density: 20.8/km^{2} (53.8/sq mi)
- Time zone: UTC+01:00 (CET)
  - Summer (DST): UTC+02:00 (CEST)
- INSEE/Postal code: 41068 /41230
- ^{1} French Land Register data, which excludes lakes, ponds, glaciers > 1 km^{2} (0.386 sq mi or 247 acres) and river estuaries.

Courmemin (French pronunciation: [kuʁməmɛ̃]) is a commune in the Loir-et-Cher department of central France.

== Population ==
Historical population
Year	Pop.	±% p.a.
1968	588	—
1975	505	−2.15%
1982	503	−0.06%
1990	526	+0.56%
1999	471	−1.22%
2007	516	+1.15%
2012	521	+0.19%
2017	509	−0.46%
2023	502	−0.23%
Source: INSEE

== See also ==
- Communes of the Loir-et-Cher department
