= Mennetou-sur-Cher =

- Commune
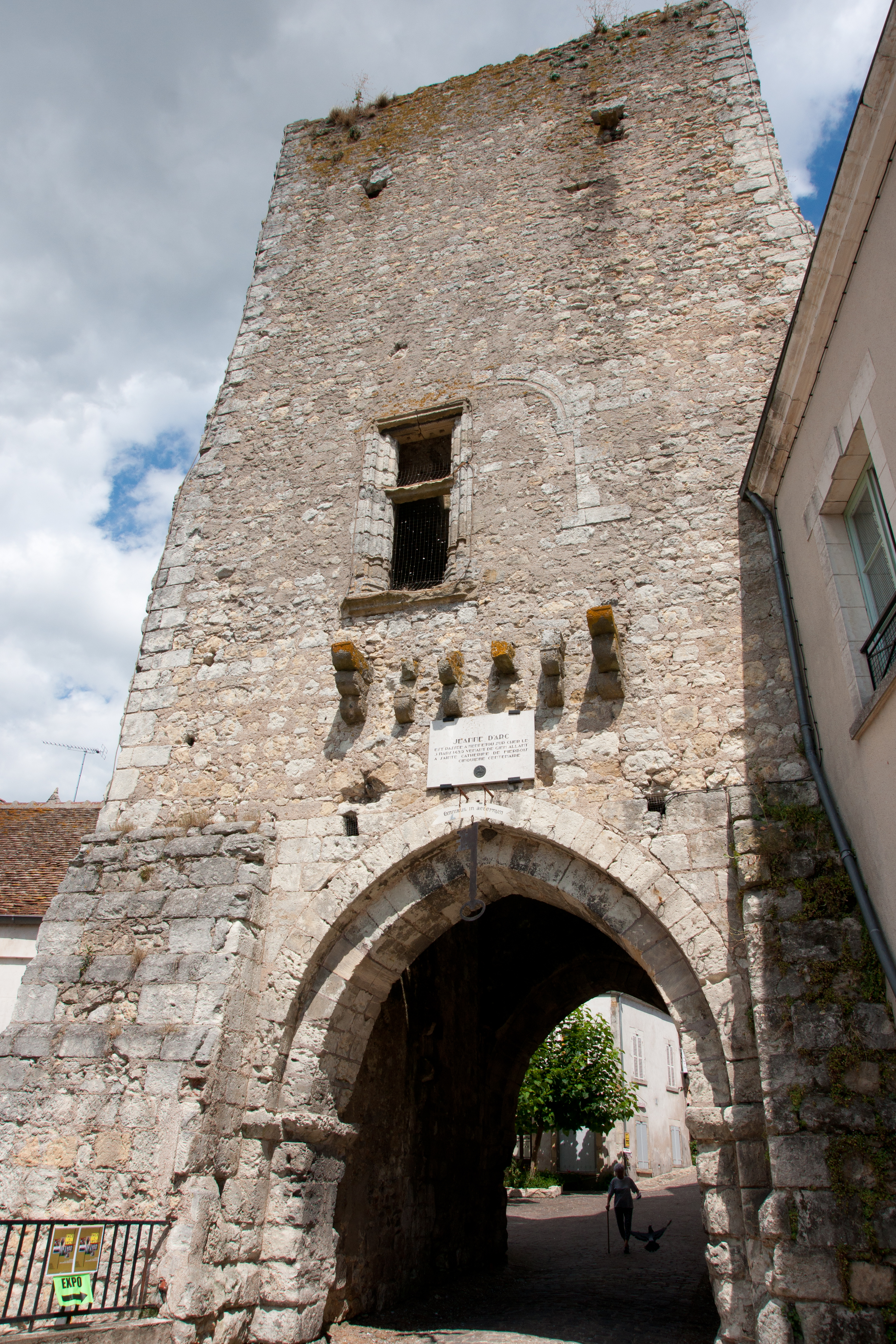
- The Joan of Arc gate

- Coat of arms
- Location of Mennetou-sur-Cher
- Location within France Location within Centre-Val de Loire
- Coordinates: 47°16′14″N 1°52′00″E
- Country: France
- Region: Centre-Val de Loire
- Department: Loir-et-Cher
- Arrondissement: Romorantin-Lanthenay
- Canton: Selles-sur-Cher

Government
  - Mayor (2020–2026): Christophe Thorin
- Area^{1}: 16.26 km^{2} (6.28 sq mi)
- Elevation: 100 m (330 ft)
- Highest elevation: 136 m (446 ft)
- Lowest elevation: 85 m (279 ft)
- Population (2023): 818
  - Density: 50.3/km^{2} (130/sq mi)
- Time zone: UTC+01:00 (CET)
  - Summer (DST): UTC+02:00 (CEST)
- INSEE/Postal code: 41135 /41320
- ^{1} French Land Register data, which excludes lakes, ponds, glaciers > 1 km^{2} (0.386 sq mi or 247 acres) and river estuaries.

Mennetou-sur-Cher (French pronunciation: [mɛntu syʁ ʃɛʁ]; lit. 'Mennetou-on-Cher') is a commune in the Loir-et-Cher department of central France.

== Population ==
Historical population
Year	Pop.	±% p.a.
1968	967	—
1975	984	+0.25%
1982	900	−1.27%
1990	827	−1.05%
1999	903	+0.98%
2007	877	−0.36%
2012	885	+0.18%
2017	885	+0.00%
2023	818	−1.30%
Source: INSEE

== See also ==
- Communes of the Loir-et-Cher department
