= Billy, Loir-et-Cher =

Billy
- Commune
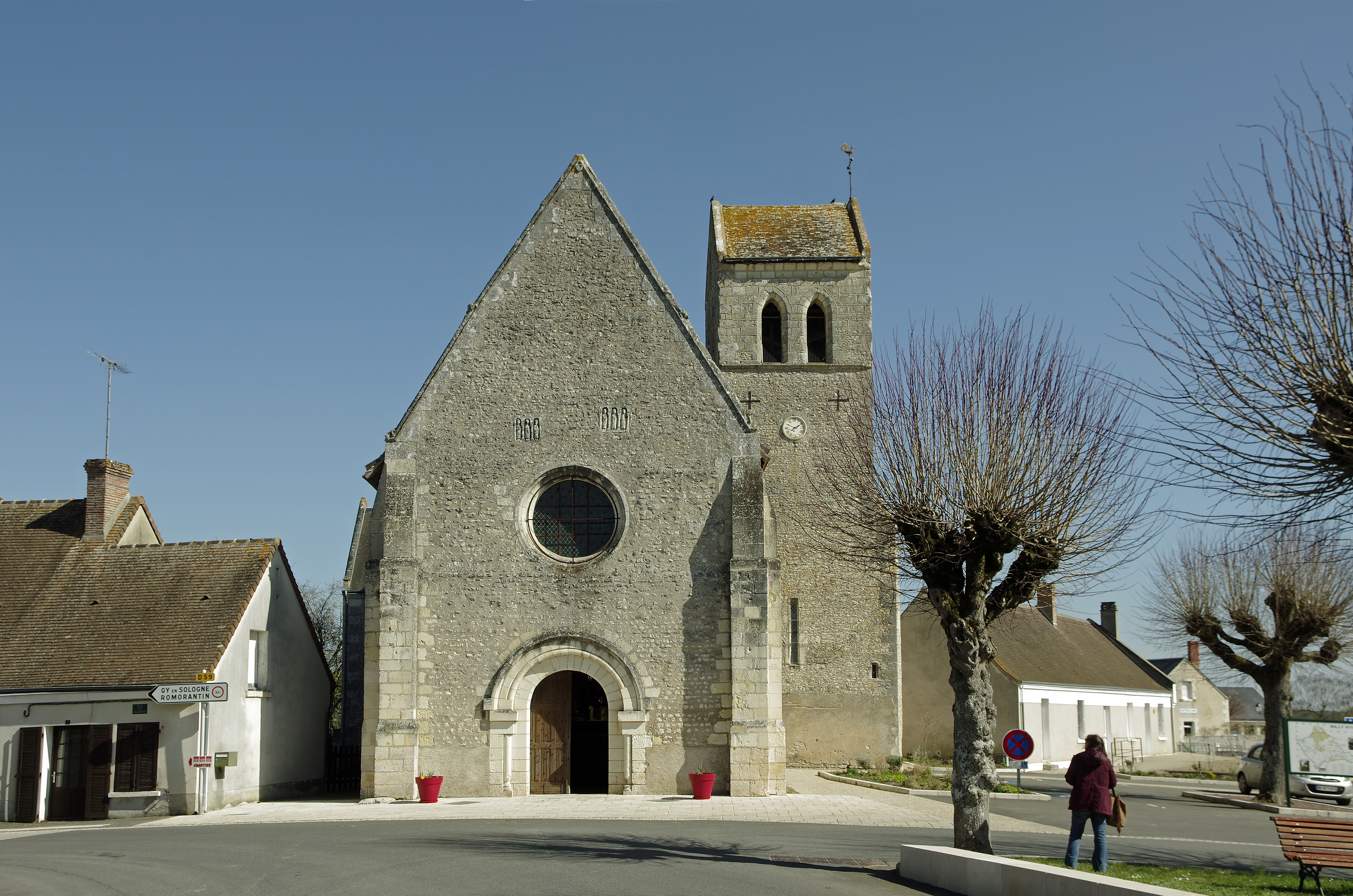

- Coat of arms
- Location of Billy
- Location within France Location within Centre-Val de Loire
- Coordinates: 47°18′47″N 1°32′22″E
- Country: France
- Region: Centre-Val de Loire
- Department: Loir-et-Cher
- Arrondissement: Romorantin-Lanthenay
- Canton: Selles-sur-Cher
- Intercommunality: Romorantinais et Monestois

Government
  - Mayor (2020–2026): Nicolas Garnier
- Area^{1}: 26.47 km^{2} (10.22 sq mi)
- Elevation: 90 m (300 ft)
- Highest elevation: 107 m (351 ft)
- Lowest elevation: 69 m (226 ft)
- Population (2023): 1,118
  - Density: 42.24/km^{2} (109.4/sq mi)
- Time zone: UTC+01:00 (CET)
  - Summer (DST): UTC+02:00 (CEST)
- INSEE/Postal code: 41016 /41130
- ^{1} French Land Register data, which excludes lakes, ponds, glaciers > 1 km^{2} (0.386 sq mi or 247 acres) and river estuaries.

Billy (French pronunciation: [biji]) is a commune in the Loir-et-Cher department in central France.

== Population ==
Historical population

Year	Pop.	±% p.a.
1793	465	—
1800	454	−0.34%
1806	471	+0.61%
1821	546	+0.99%
1831	629	+1.43%
1836	621	−0.26%
1841	621	+0.00%
1846	720	+3.00%
1851	794	+1.98%
1856	877	+2.01%
1861	909	+0.72%
1866	1,038	+2.69%
1872	1,030	−0.13%
1876	1,050	+0.48%
1881	1,061	+0.21%
1886	1,089	+0.52%
1891	1,043	−0.86%
1896	1,054	+0.21%
1901	1,093	+0.73%

Year	Pop.	±% p.a.
1906	1,070	−0.42%
1911	1,037	−0.62%
1921	977	−0.59%
1926	944	−0.68%
1931	852	−2.03%
1936	895	+0.99%
1946	860	−0.40%
1954	841	−0.28%
1962	854	+0.19%
1968	798	−1.12%
1975	808	+0.18%
1982	767	−0.74%
1990	804	+0.59%
1999	800	−0.06%
2007	792	−0.13%
2012	983	+4.42%
2017	1,020	+0.74%
2023	1,118	+1.54%

Source: EHESS and INSEE

== See also ==
- Communes of the Loir-et-Cher department
