= La Chapelle-Montmartin =

- Commune
- Location of La Chapelle-Montmartin
- Location within France Location within Centre-Val de Loire
- Coordinates: 47°16′16″N 1°44′26″E
- Country: France
- Region: Centre-Val de Loire
- Department: Loir-et-Cher
- Arrondissement: Romorantin-Lanthenay
- Canton: Selles-sur-Cher
- Intercommunality: Romorantinais et Monestois

Government
  - Mayor (2023–2026): Anne-Laure Chevalier
- Area^{1}: 10.72 km^{2} (4.14 sq mi)
- Elevation: 124 m (407 ft)
- Highest elevation: 152 m (499 ft)
- Lowest elevation: 82 m (269 ft)
- Population (2023): 407
  - Density: 38.0/km^{2} (98.3/sq mi)
- Time zone: UTC+01:00 (CET)
  - Summer (DST): UTC+02:00 (CEST)
- INSEE/Postal code: 41038 /41320
- ^{1} French Land Register data, which excludes lakes, ponds, glaciers > 1 km^{2} (0.386 sq mi or 247 acres) and river estuaries.

La Chapelle-Montmartin (French pronunciation: [la ʃapɛl mɔ̃maʁtɛ̃]) is a commune in the Loir-et-Cher department in central France.

== Population ==
Historical population
Year	Pop.	±% p.a.
1968	213	—
1975	289	+4.46%
1982	306	+0.82%
1990	329	+0.91%
1999	372	+1.37%
2007	393	+0.69%
2012	415	+1.10%
2017	435	+0.95%
2023	407	−1.10%
Source: INSEE

== See also ==
- Communes of the Loir-et-Cher department
