= Orçay =

- Location of Orçay
- Location within France Location within Centre-Val de Loire
- Coordinates: 47°17′29″N 2°06′42″E
- Country: France
- Region: Centre-Val de Loire
- Department: Loir-et-Cher
- Arrondissement: Romorantin-Lanthenay
- Canton: Selles-sur-Cher
- Intercommunality: La Sologne des rivières

Government
  - Mayor (2020–2026): Christelle Da Fonte
- Area^{1}: 18.75 km^{2} (7.24 sq mi)
- Elevation: 169 m (554 ft)
- Highest elevation: 168 m (551 ft)
- Lowest elevation: 122 m (400 ft)
- Population (2023): 206
  - Density: 11.0/km^{2} (28.5/sq mi)
- Time zone: UTC+01:00 (CET)
  - Summer (DST): UTC+02:00 (CEST)
- INSEE/Postal code: 41168 /41300
- ^{1} French Land Register data, which excludes lakes, ponds, glaciers > 1 km^{2} (0.386 sq mi or 247 acres) and river estuaries.

Orçay (French pronunciation: [ɔʁsɛ]) is a commune in the Loir-et-Cher department of central France.

== Population ==
Historical population
Year	Pop.	±% p.a.
1968	177	—
1975	191	+1.09%
1982	260	+4.50%
1990	259	−0.05%
1999	257	−0.09%
2007	236	−1.06%
2012	249	+1.08%
2017	235	−1.15%
2023	206	−2.17%
Source: INSEE

== See also ==
- Communes of the Loir-et-Cher department
