= Maray =

- Commune
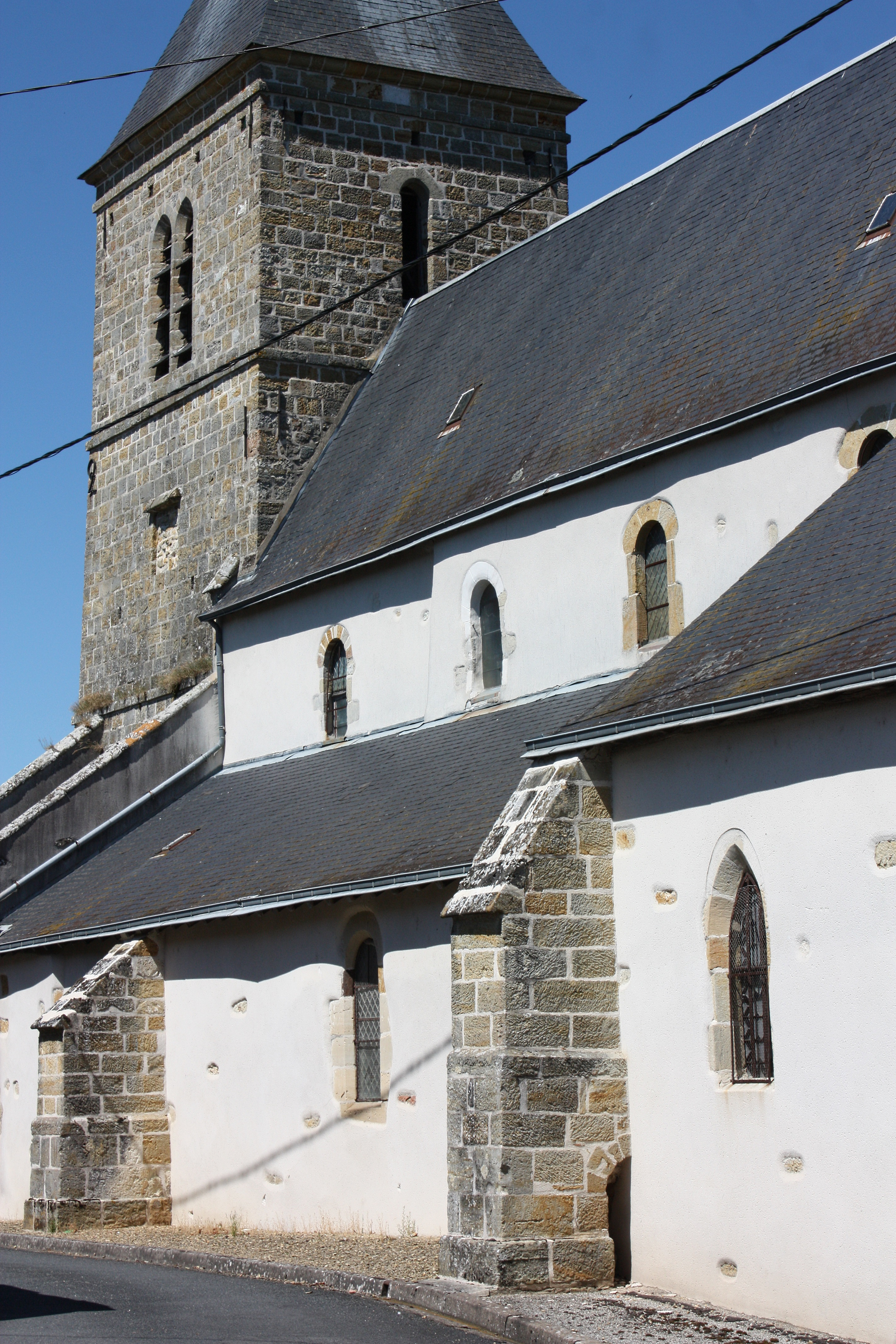
- Church of Saint Aignan in Maray

- Coat of arms
- Location of Maray
- Location within France Location within Centre-Val de Loire
- Coordinates: 47°14′53″N 1°53′09″E
- Country: France
- Region: Centre-Val de Loire
- Department: Loir-et-Cher
- Arrondissement: Romorantin-Lanthenay
- Canton: Selles-sur-Cher

Government
  - Mayor (2020–2026): Gérard Thué
- Area^{1}: 27.8 km^{2} (10.7 sq mi)
- Elevation: 120 m (390 ft)
- Highest elevation: 151 m (495 ft)
- Lowest elevation: 85 m (279 ft)
- Population (2023): 221
  - Density: 7.95/km^{2} (20.6/sq mi)
- Time zone: UTC+01:00 (CET)
  - Summer (DST): UTC+02:00 (CEST)
- INSEE/Postal code: 41122 /41320
- ^{1} French Land Register data, which excludes lakes, ponds, glaciers > 1 km^{2} (0.386 sq mi or 247 acres) and river estuaries.

Maray (French pronunciation: [maʁɛ]) is a commune in the Loir-et-Cher department of central France.

== Population ==
Historical population
Year	Pop.	±% p.a.
1968	344	—
1975	293	−2.27%
1982	297	+0.19%
1990	294	−0.13%
1999	252	−1.70%
2007	235	−0.87%
2012	233	−0.17%
2017	233	+0.00%
2023	221	−0.88%
Source: INSEE

== See also ==
- Communes of the Loir-et-Cher department
