= Langon-sur-Cher =

- Commune
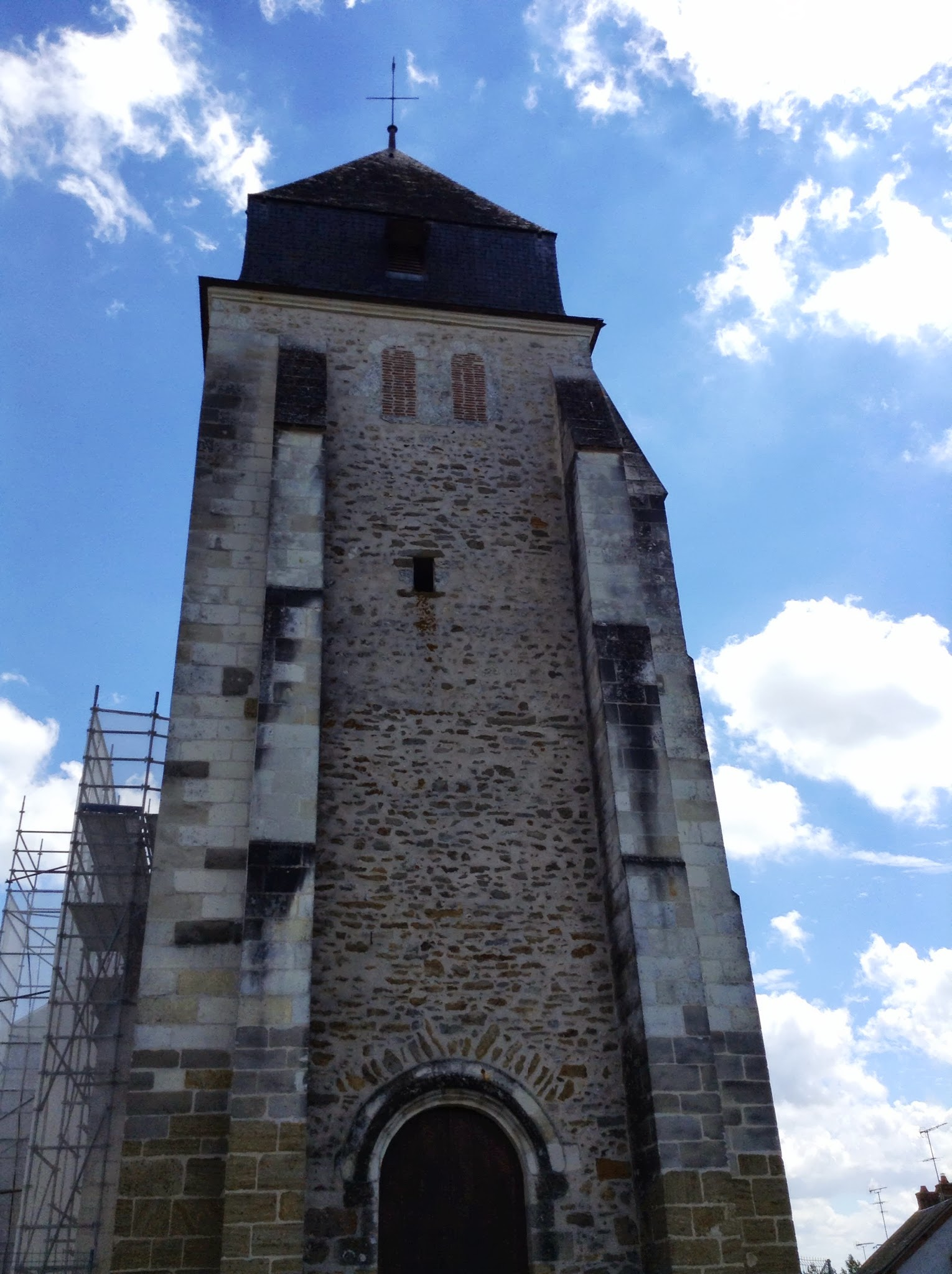
- Church of Saint-Sulpice

- Coat of arms
- Location of Langon-sur-Cher
- Location within France Location within Centre-Val de Loire
- Coordinates: 47°17′06″N 1°49′40″E
- Country: France
- Region: Centre-Val de Loire
- Department: Loir-et-Cher
- Arrondissement: Romorantin-Lanthenay
- Canton: Selles-sur-Cher
- Intercommunality: Romorantinais et Monestois

Government
  - Mayor (2020–2026): Dominique Retif
- Area^{1}: 38.82 km^{2} (14.99 sq mi)
- Elevation: 97 m (318 ft)
- Highest elevation: 130 m (430 ft)
- Lowest elevation: 82 m (269 ft)
- Population (2023): 821
  - Density: 21.1/km^{2} (54.8/sq mi)
- Demonym: Langonnais
- Time zone: UTC+01:00 (CET)
  - Summer (DST): UTC+02:00 (CEST)
- INSEE/Postal code: 41110 /41320
- ^{1} French Land Register data, which excludes lakes, ponds, glaciers > 1 km^{2} (0.386 sq mi or 247 acres) and river estuaries.

Langon-sur-Cher (French pronunciation: [lɑ̃ɡɔ̃ syʁ ʃɛʁ]; lit. 'Langon-on-Cher'; before 2017, simply Langon) is a rural commune in the Loir-et-Cher department of central France.

== Geography ==
The Rère forms part of the commune's northern border.

== Population ==
Historical population
| Year | Pop. | ±% p.a. |
|---|---|---|
| 1968 | 601 | — |
| 1975 | 610 | +0.21% |
| 1982 | 755 | +3.09% |
| 1990 | 813 | +0.93% |
| 1999 | 770 | −0.60% |
| 2007 | 832 | +0.97% |
| 2012 | 879 | +1.11% |
| 2017 | 812 | −1.57% |
| 2023 | 821 | +0.18% |
Source: INSEE

== See also ==
- Communes of the Loir-et-Cher department
