= Lassay-sur-Croisne =

- Commune
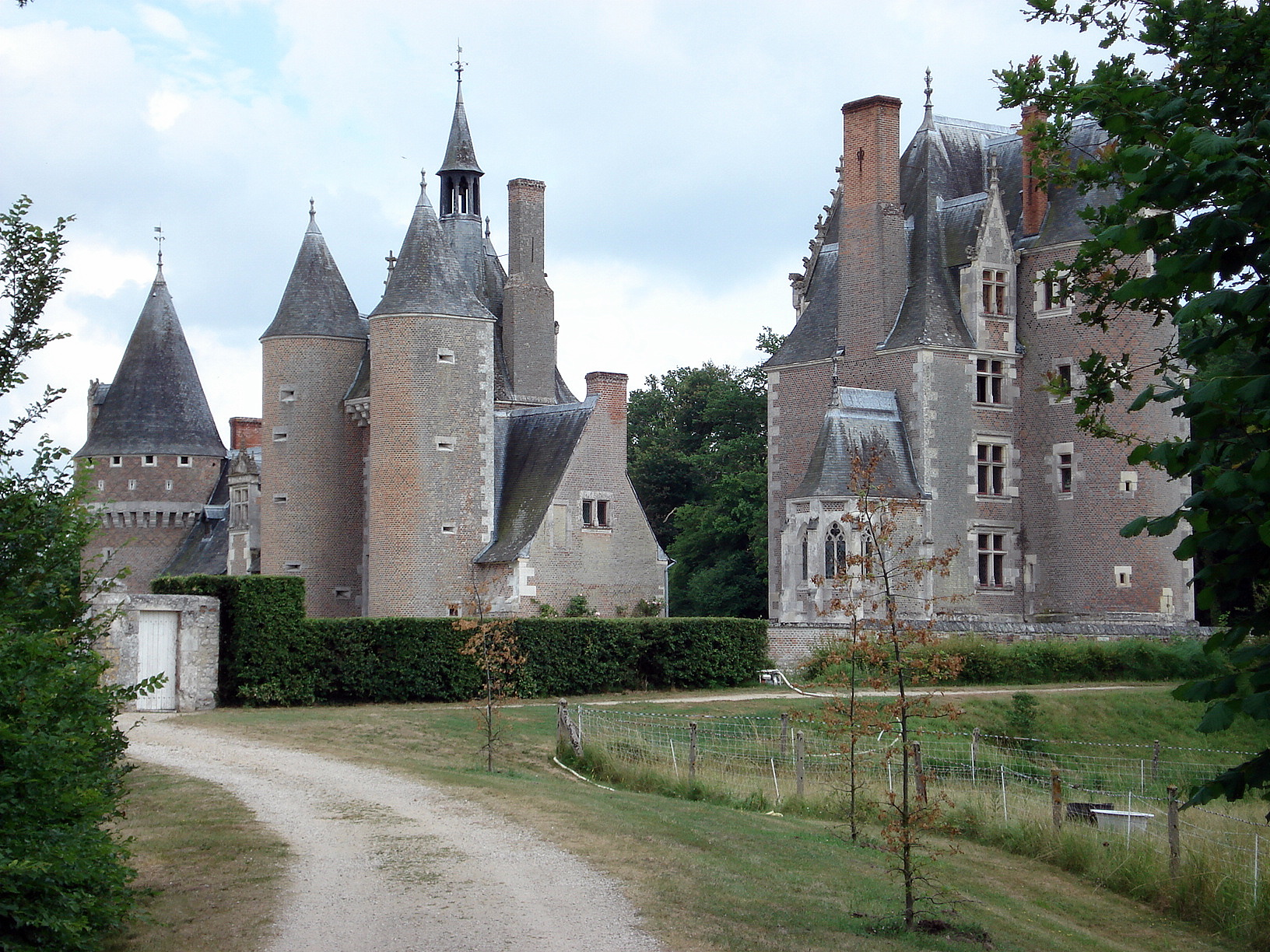
- Château du Moulin

- Coat of arms
- Location of Lassay-sur-Croisne
- Location within France Location within Centre-Val de Loire
- Coordinates: 47°22′28″N 1°37′25″E
- Country: France
- Region: Centre-Val de Loire
- Department: Loir-et-Cher
- Arrondissement: Romorantin-Lanthenay
- Canton: Selles-sur-Cher

Government
  - Mayor (2020–2026): François Gautry
- Area^{1}: 16.92 km^{2} (6.53 sq mi)
- Elevation: 100 m (330 ft)
- Highest elevation: 112 m (367 ft)
- Lowest elevation: 84 m (276 ft)
- Population (2023): 241
  - Density: 14.2/km^{2} (36.9/sq mi)
- Time zone: UTC+01:00 (CET)
  - Summer (DST): UTC+02:00 (CEST)
- INSEE/Postal code: 41112 /41230
- ^{1} French Land Register data, which excludes lakes, ponds, glaciers > 1 km^{2} (0.386 sq mi or 247 acres) and river estuaries.

Lassay-sur-Croisne (pronounced [lasɛ syʁ kʁwan]) is a commune in the Loir-et-Cher department in the administrative region of Centre-Val de Loire, France.

== Population ==
Historical population
Year	Pop.	±% p.a.
1968	137	—
1975	127	−1.08%
1982	145	+1.91%
1990	168	+1.86%
1999	184	+1.02%
2007	229	+2.77%
2012	250	+1.77%
2017	249	−0.08%
2023	241	−0.54%
Source: INSEE

== See also ==
- Communes of the Loir-et-Cher department
