= Canton of Selles-sur-Cher =

Coordinates: 47.28°N 1.55°E

The Canton of Selles-sur-Cher (French: canton de Selles-sur-Cher) is an canton of the French department of Loir-et-Cher, central France. Its borders were modified at the French canton reorganisation which came into effect in March 2015. Its seat is in Selles-sur-Cher.

It consists of the following communes:

1. Billy
2. La Chapelle-Montmartin
3. Châtres-sur-Cher
4. Gièvres
5. Gy-en-Sologne
6. Langon-sur-Cher
7. Lassay-sur-Croisne
8. Maray
9. Mennetou-sur-Cher
10. Mur-de-Sologne
11. Orçay
12. Pruniers-en-Sologne
13. Saint-Julien-sur-Cher
14. Saint-Loup
15. Selles-sur-Cher
16. Theillay
17. Villefranche-sur-Cher
