= Gièvres =

- Commune
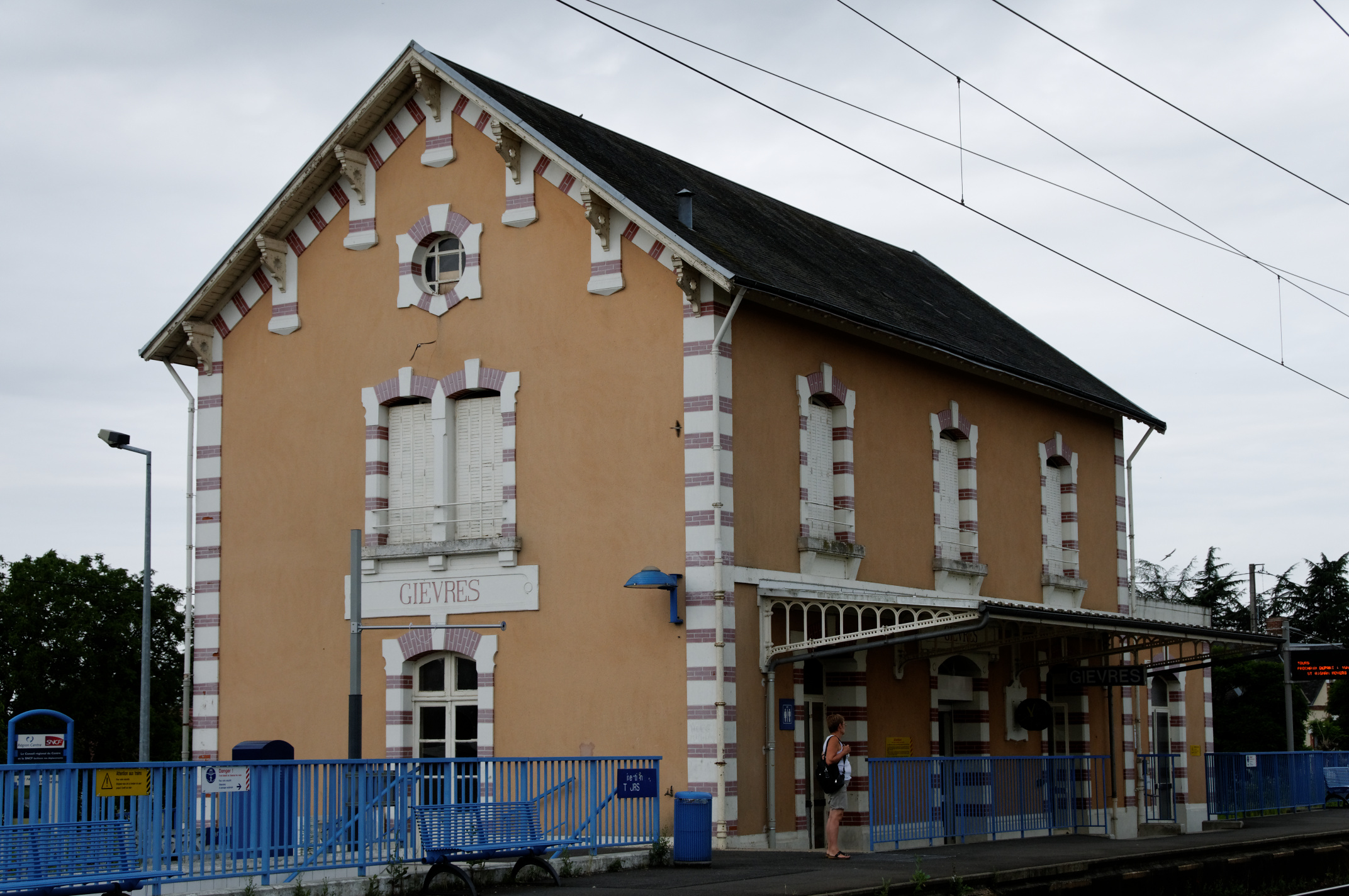
- Railway station

- Coat of arms
- Location of Gièvres
- Location within France Location within Centre-Val de Loire
- Coordinates: 47°16′38″N 1°40′11″E
- Country: France
- Region: Centre-Val de Loire
- Department: Loir-et-Cher
- Arrondissement: Romorantin-Lanthenay
- Canton: Selles-sur-Cher
- Intercommunality: Romorantinais et Monestois

Government
  - Mayor (2020–2026): Françoise Gilot-Leclerc
- Area^{1}: 38.05 km^{2} (14.69 sq mi)
- Highest elevation: 102 m (335 ft)
- Lowest elevation: 72 m (236 ft)
- Population (2023): 2,268
  - Density: 59.61/km^{2} (154.4/sq mi)
- Time zone: UTC+01:00 (CET)
  - Summer (DST): UTC+02:00 (CEST)
- INSEE/Postal code: 41097 /41130
- ^{1} French Land Register data, which excludes lakes, ponds, glaciers > 1 km^{2} (0.386 sq mi or 247 acres) and river estuaries.

Gièvres (French pronunciation: [ʒjɛvʁ]) is a commune in the Loir-et-Cher department, France.

== Population ==
Historical population

Year	Pop.	±% p.a.
1793	544	—
1821	885	+1.75%
1846	1,001	+0.49%
1872	1,225	+0.78%
1901	1,298	+0.20%
1926	1,363	+0.20%
1946	1,185	−0.70%
1962	1,292	+0.54%
1968	1,254	−0.50%

Year	Pop.	±% p.a.
1975	1,534	+2.92%
1982	1,666	+1.19%
1990	1,767	+0.74%
1999	1,999	+1.38%
2007	2,189	+1.14%
2012	2,429	+2.10%
2017	2,396	−0.27%
2023	2,268	−0.91%

Source: EHESS and INSEE (1968-2023)

== See also ==
- Communes of the Loir-et-Cher department
