= Villefranche-sur-Cher =

- Commune
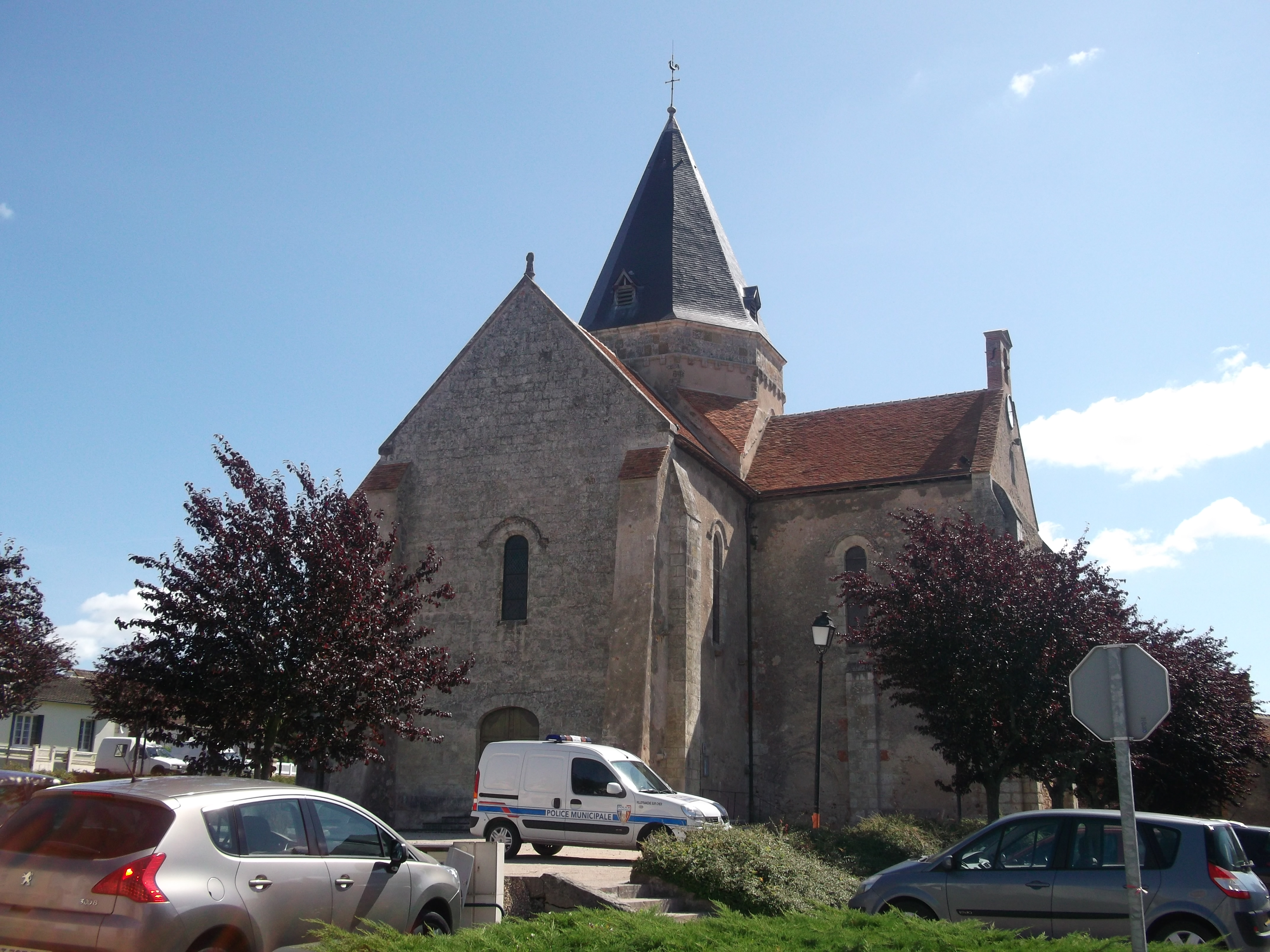
- Church of Sainte-Marie-Madeleine

- Coat of arms
- Location of Villefranche-sur-Cher
- Location within France Location within Centre-Val de Loire
- Coordinates: 47°17′39″N 1°46′15″E
- Country: France
- Region: Centre-Val de Loire
- Department: Loir-et-Cher
- Arrondissement: Romorantin-Lanthenay
- Canton: Selles-sur-Cher
- Intercommunality: Romorantinais et Monestois

Government
  - Mayor (2020–2026): Bruno Marechal
- Area^{1}: 27.23 km^{2} (10.51 sq mi)
- Elevation: 98 m (322 ft)
- Highest elevation: 123 m (404 ft)
- Lowest elevation: 82 m (269 ft)
- Population (2023): 2,678
  - Density: 98.35/km^{2} (254.7/sq mi)
- Time zone: UTC+01:00 (CET)
  - Summer (DST): UTC+02:00 (CEST)
- INSEE/Postal code: 41280 /41200
- ^{1} French Land Register data, which excludes lakes, ponds, glaciers > 1 km^{2} (0.386 sq mi or 247 acres) and river estuaries.

Villefranche-sur-Cher (French pronunciation: [vilfʁɑ̃ʃ syʁ ʃɛʁ], before 1962: Villefranche) is a commune in the Loir-et-Cher department, central France.

== Population ==
Historical population

Year	Pop.	±% p.a.
1793	421	—
1821	592	+1.22%
1846	1,363	+3.39%
1872	1,640	+0.71%
1901	1,707	+0.14%
1926	1,570	−0.33%
1946	1,443	−0.42%
1962	1,527	+0.35%
1968	1,540	+0.14%

Year	Pop.	±% p.a.
1975	1,743	+1.78%
1982	2,055	+2.38%
1990	2,298	+1.41%
1999	2,409	+0.53%
2007	2,614	+1.03%
2012	2,746	+0.99%
2017	2,667	−0.58%
2023	2,678	+0.07%

Source: EHESS and INSEE (1968-2023)

== See also ==
- Communes of the Loir-et-Cher department
