= Sologne =

Natural region in Central France

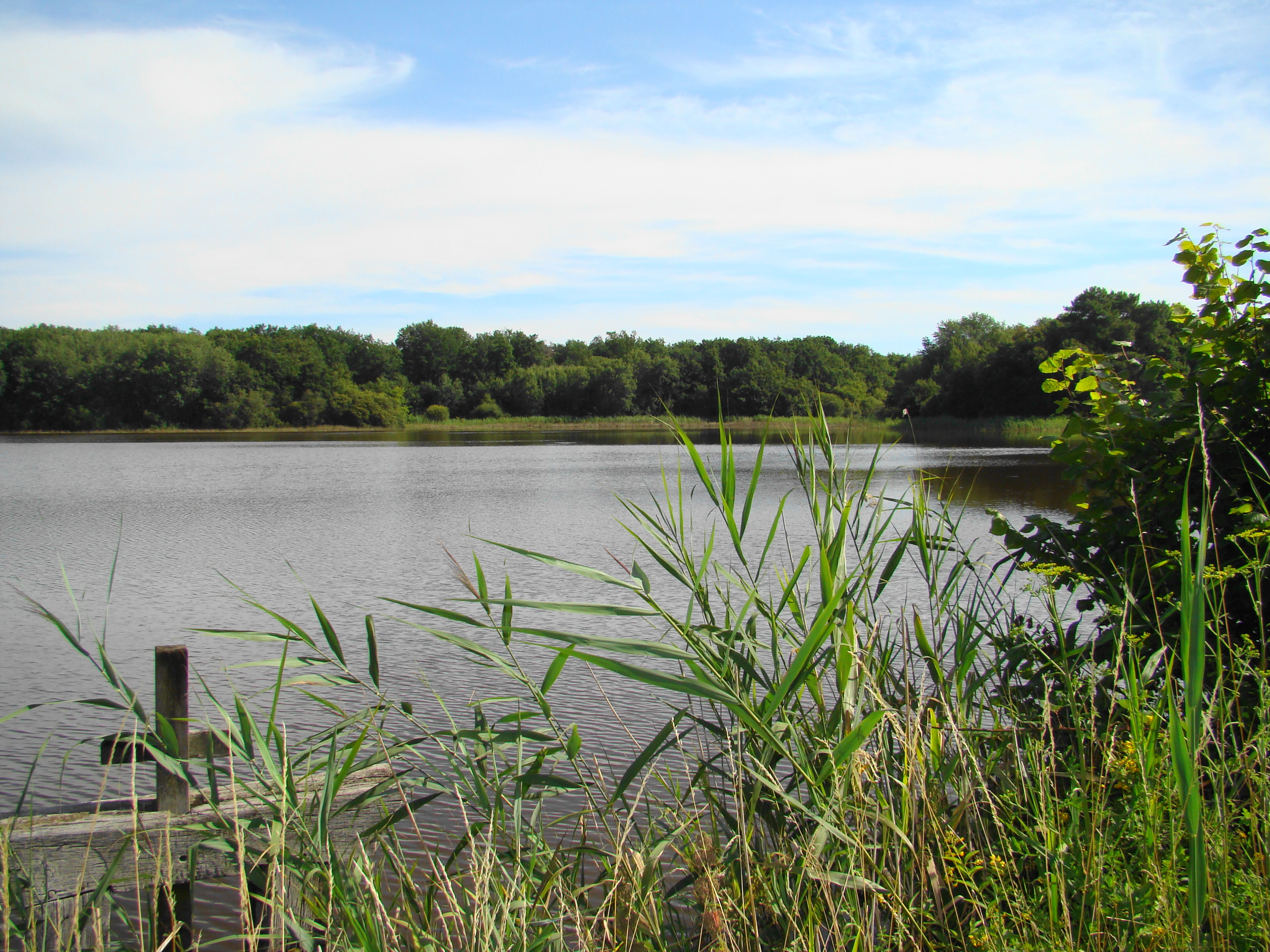
The pond of Sologne between the communes of Lassay-sur-Croisne and Pruniers-en-Sologne.

Sologne (/səˈlɔɪn/; French pronunciation: [sɔlɔɲ]) is a natural region in Centre-Val de Loire, France, extending over portions of the departements of Loiret, Loir-et-Cher and Cher. Its area is about 5,000 square kilometres (1,900 sq mi). To its north is the river Loire, to its south the river Cher, while the districts of Sancerre and Berry are to its east. Its inhabitants are known as the Solognots (masculine) and Solognotes (feminine).

Its name is thought to derive either from the Latin sœcalonia ("rye country") or sabulonia ("sandy country").

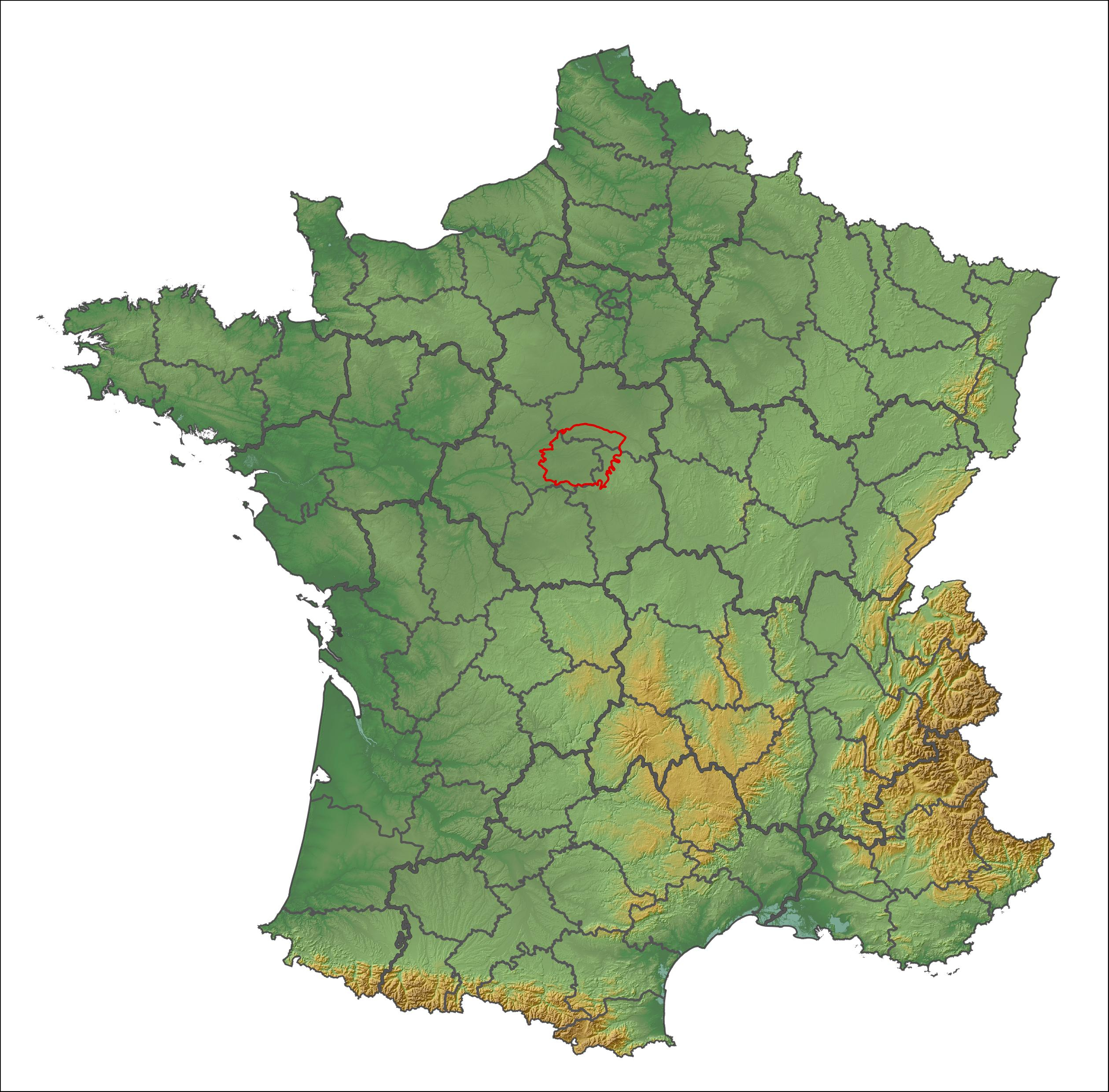
Location of the Sologne (red ring) in France

== Geography ==
The Sologne is watered by the Cosson and the Beuvron, tributaries of the Loire, and the Sauldre, a tributary of the Cher, all three having a west-south-westerly direction. The pools and marshes which are characteristic of the region are due to the impermeability of its soil, which is a mixture of sand and clay.

The main towns of Sologne are:

- Orléans (the most southern part of the city (La Source) and the university have been built in the woods of Sologne)
- Romorantin-Lanthenay (which hosts the Museum of Sologne)
- La Ferté-Saint-Aubin
- Salbris
- Lamotte-Beuvron
- Aubigny-sur-Nère

== History ==
In the middle of the 19th century Napoleon III led the way in the reclamation of swamps, the planting of pines and other trees and other land alterations. Arable farming and stock-raising are fairly flourishing in the Sologne, but there is little manufacturing activity, the cloth manufacture of Romorantin being the chief industry. Game is abundant, and the region owes much of its revived prosperity to the creation of large sporting estates.

== Cultural references ==
In the early 18th century, Jean-Philippe Rameau composed a famous harpsichord piece, Les Niais de Sologne, whose name translates as "the simpletons of Sologne". The form is a rondo with two episodes that are variations on the main section. Despite the title (which may allude to the meandering melody throughout), its use of ornamentation denotes a work of great subtlety and sophistication.

The book Le Grand Meaulnes by Alain-Fournier is set in the region of Sologne and mentions several places, such as Bourges, Vierzon, and the Cher. It is somewhere in this region where Meaulnes becomes lost and stumbles across the mysterious estate.

Many stories and essays of Maurice Genevoix are set in Sologne.

=== UN World Heritage Site ===
The Château de Chambord is situated in the region.
