= Châteaux of the Loire Valley =

Historic grand residences in a part of France

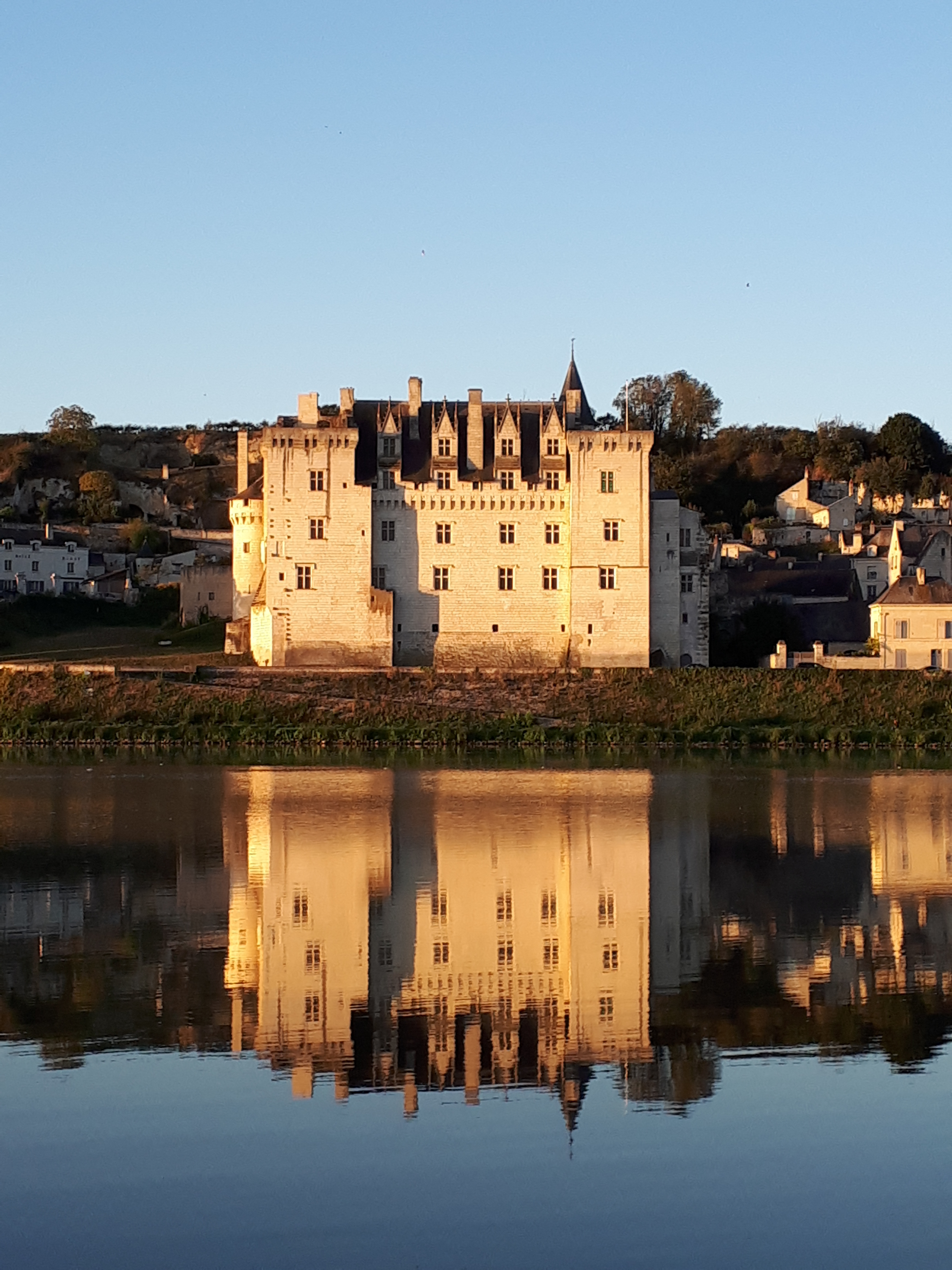
- Château de Montsoreau
- Interactive map of Châteaux of the Loire Valley
- Location: France (Centre, Pays de la Loire)

History
- Built: Renaissance period

Site notes
- Architectural style: French Renaissance architecture

UNESCO World Heritage Site
- Type: Cultural
- Designated: 2000
- Part of: The Loire Valley between Sully-sur-Loire and Chalonnes
- Reference no.: 933
- Country: France
- Region: Europe and North America

The châteaux of the Loire Valley (French: châteaux de la Loire) are part of the architectural heritage of the historic towns of Amboise, Angers, Blois, Chinon, Montsoreau, Orléans, Saumur, and Tours along the river Loire in France. They illustrate Renaissance ideals of design in France.

The châteaux of the Loire Valley number over three hundred, ranging from practical fortified castles from the 10th century to splendid residences built half a millennium later. When the French kings began constructing their huge châteaux in the Loire Valley, the nobility, drawn to the seat of power, followed suit, attracting the finest architects and landscape designers. The châteaux and their surrounding gardens are cultural monuments which embody the ideals of the Renaissance and Enlightenment. Many of the châteaux were built on hilltops, such as the Château d'Amboise, while the only one built in the riverbed is the Château de Montsoreau. Many had exquisite churches on the grounds or within the château.

== History ==
With the Hundred Years' War concluded, Charles VII, Louis XI, and their successors preferred to spend the bulk of their time in the "garden of France" along the banks of the Loire. In the late 15th century Tours, then Blois, and later Amboise became the preferred locations of the French royal court. Many courtiers bought dilapidated castles built by the medieval Counts of Blois and of Anjou, and they had them reconstructed in the latest Italianate fashion. Leonardo da Vinci and other Italian artists arrived to design and beautify these residences.

In the 16th century, Francis I moved his main residence back to the Louvre, in Paris. With him went the great architects, but the Loire Valley continued to be the place where French royalty preferred to spend their time when not in the capital. Toward the end of the 17th century, Louis XIV made the Île-de-France the permanent locale for great royal residences when he built the Palace of Versailles. Nonetheless, those who gained the king's favour, as well as the wealthy bourgeoisie, continued to renovate existing châteaux or build lavish new ones in the Loire Valley as summer residences.

The French Revolution saw a number of the great châteaux destroyed and many ransacked, their treasures stolen. The overnight impoverishment of many French noble families, usually after one of their members lost his or her head to the guillotine, saw many châteaux demolished. During World War I and World War II, various chateaux were commandeered as military headquarters. Some of these continued to be so used after the end of World War II.

Today, the remaining privately owned châteaux serve as homes and some of them open their doors to tourists, while others operate as hotels or bed-and-breakfasts. Many others have been taken over by local governments, and the grandest, like those at Chambord, are owned and operated by the national government and are major tourist sites, attracting hundreds of thousands of visitors each year.

== List of châteaux of the Loire ==
Though there may be no universally accepted definition for the designation, the main criterion is that the château must be situated close to the Loire or one of its tributaries (such as the Maine, Cher, Indre, Creuse or Loir). Châteaux further upstream than Gien are generally not included, with the possible exception of the Bastie d'Urfé for its historical significance.

=== Royal châteaux ===
Château	Commune	Département	Coordinates	Historic Events	Image
Amboise	Amboise	Indre-et-Loire	47°24′47″N 0°59′9″E	Accidental death of Charles VIII (1498); Amboise conspiracy (1560) Edict of Amboise with the Calvinists (1563)	Château d'Amboise
Angers	Angers	Maine-et-Loire	47°28′12″N 0°33′36″W	Location of the Apocalypse Tapestry	Château d'Angers, Maine-et-Loire, Pays de la Loire, France. La porte des champs côté sud au premier plan, était l'entrée principale de la forteresse à l'origine.
Blois	Blois	Loir-et-Cher	47°35′8″N 1°19′51″E	Assassination of Henry I, Duke of Guise (1588)	sans cadre
Chambord	Chambord	Loir-et-Cher	47°36′58″N 1°31′2″E	Considered the most magnificent Loire château Treaty of Chambord (1552)	Château de Chambord
Chenonceau	Chenonceaux	Indre-et-Loire	47°19′31″N 1°4′13″E	Owned by Diane de Poitiers (1547–1559) and Catherine de Médicis (1559–1589)	Château de Chenonceau
Chinon	Chinon	Indre-et-Loire	47°10′5″N 0°14′10″E	Meeting between Charles VII and Joan of Arc (1429)	Château de Chinon, vue de la Vienne
Langeais	Langeais	Indre-et-Loire	47°19′29″N 0°24′22″E	Marriage of Charles VIII and Anne of Brittany (1491)	Château de Langeais
Loches	Loches	Indre-et-Loire	47°7′29″N 0°59′48″E	Captured by Richard the Lionheart (1194) Residence of Agnès Sorel (1443–1450)	Château de Loches, Loches, FRANCE
Plessis-lez-Tours	La Riche	Indre-et-Loire	47°22′57″N 0°39′38″E	Treaty of Tours (1444) Death of Louis XI (1483) Death of Francis of Paola (1507), founder of the Order of Minims Treaty of Plessis-les-Tours (1580) Meeting between Henry III and the king of Navarre, future Henry IV, who allied against the Catholic League (1589)	Château de Plessiz-lèz-Tours
Saumur	Saumur	Maine-et-Loire	47°15′22″N 0°4′21″W	"Château d'amour" of the king René of Anjou (1454–1472); Place of sanctuary for Protestants (1589)	Château de Saumur
Tours	Tours	Indre-et-Loire	47°23′49″N 0°41′34″E	Marriage of the future Louis XI and Margaret of Scotland (1436); Imprisonment of Charles, Duke of Guise (1588–1591)	Le château de Tours.

=== Châteaux of the nobility ===
Château	Commune	Département	Coordinates	Notes	Image
Azay-le-Rideau	Azay-le-Rideau	Indre-et-Loire	47°15′33″N 0°27′58″E	Masterpiece of the first French Renaissance	Château d'Azay-le-Rideau, Indre-et-Loire, France
Armaillé	Loches	Indre-et-Loire	47°07′47″N 0°00′10″E	Loches Château of Count Arthur de Marsay	Château d'Armailé from the river frontage, Loches, Tours
Beauregard	Cellettes	Loir-et-Cher	47°32′13″N 1°23′3″E	Art gallery	Château de Beauregard
Brézé	Brézé	Maine-et-Loire	47°10′28″N 0°03′27″W	Artifacts of Troglodytes under the château Deepest moats in France	Château de Brézé
Brissac	Brissac Loire Aubance	Maine-et-Loire	47°21′11″N 0°26′59″W	Seat of the Dukes of Brissac	Façade est du château de Brissac-Quincé. Département de Maine-et-Loire, France.
Chanteloup	Amboise	Indre-et-Loire	47°23′28″N 0°58′13″E	Property of Duke of Choiseul (1760–1785)	Château de Chanteloup
Châteaudun	Châteaudun	Eure-et-Loir	48°04′15″N 1°19′25″E	Property of Jean de Dunois (1439–1468)	Château de Châteaudun
Chaumont-sur-Loire	Chaumont-sur-Loire	Loir-et-Cher	47°28′45″N 1°10′55″E	Property of Catherine de' Medici (1550–1559) et Diane de Poitiers (1559–1566)	Château de Chaumont sur Loire, FRANCE
Cheverny	Cheverny	Loir-et-Cher	47°30′1″N 1°27′29″E	Inspiration for Hergé's Marlinspike Hall	Château de Cheverny - Vue Frontale
Clos-Lucé	Amboise	Indre-et-Loire	47°24′36″N 0°59′31″E	Home to Leonardo da Vinci (1516–1519)	Le Clos Lucé, en Indre-et-Loire, en France
Meillant	Meillant	Cher	46°46′59″N 2°30′15″E	Contains the famous Tour du Lion	Château de Meillant
Montsoreau	Montsoreau	Maine-et-Loire	47°12′56″N 0°03′44″E	Only Château in the Loire Valley constructed in the Loire riverbed Château de Montsoreau-Museum of Contemporary Art has the world's largest holding of Art & Language works	Château de Montsoreau
Richelieu	Richelieu	Indre-et-Loire	47°00′26″N 0°19′33″E	Property of Cardinal Richelieu (1621-1642)	Château de Richelieu
Sully-sur-Loire	Sully-sur-Loire	Loiret	47°46′4″N 2°22′31″E	Property of Maximilien de Béthune, Duke of Sully (1602–1641)	Château de Sully-sur-Loire
Ussé	Rigny-Ussé	Indre-et-Loire	47°14′59″N 0°17′28″E	Inspiration for Charles Perrault's Sleeping Beauty	Château d'Ussé, façade Est
Valençay	Valençay	Indre	47°9′27″N 1°33′48″E	Property of Talleyrand (1803–1838)	Château de Valençay
Villandry	Villandry	Indre-et-Loire	47°20′26″N 0°30′51″E	Famous for its French formal gardens	(Château de Villandry (France) vu des jardins)

=== Other châteaux ===
Château	Commune	Département	Coordinates	Image
Argy	Argy	Indre	46°56′20″N 1°26′08″E	Château d'Argy
Azay-le-Ferron	Azay-le-Ferron	Indre	46°51′04″N 1°04′12″E	Château d'Azay-le-Ferron
Baugé	Baugé	Maine-et-Loire	47°32′29″N 0°06′07″E	Château de Baugé
Beaugency	Beaugency	Loiret	47°46′45″N 1°37′57″E	Château de Beaugency
Boisgibault	Ardon	Loiret	47°47′18″N 1°52′00″E	Château de Boisgibault
Boumois	Saint-Martin-de-la-Place	Maine-et-Loire	47°18′30″N 0°07′48″W	
Briare	Briare	Loiret	47°38′22″N 2°44′27″E	Château de Briare
Candé	Monts	Indre-et-Loire	47°17′49″N 0°39′56″E	Château de Candé
Chamerolles	Chilleurs-aux-Bois	Loiret	48°03′37″N 2°09′51″E	Château de Chamerolles
Châteauneuf-sur-Loire	Châteauneuf-sur-Loire	Loiret	47°51′51″N 2°13′00″E	Château de Châteauneuf-sur-Loire
Chémery	Chémery	Loir-et-Cher	47°20′43″N 1°28′48″E	Château de Chémery
Chissay	Chissay-en-Touraine	Loir-et-Cher	47°20′13″N 1°08′11″E	Château de Chissay
Courtalain	Courtalain	Eure-et-Loir	48°04′49″N 1°08′11″E	Château de Courtalain
Fougères-sur-Bièvre	Fougères-sur-Bièvre	Loir-et-Cher	47°26′52″N 1°20′37″E	Château de Fougères-sur-Bièvre
Gaillard	Amboise	Indre-et-Loire	47°24′47″N 0°59′09″E	Château Gaillard
Gien	Gien	Loiret	47°41′06″N 2°37′54″E	Château de Gien
Gizeux	Gizeux	Indre-et-Loire	47°23′26″N 0°12′22″E	Château de Gizeux
Gué-Péan	Monthou-sur-Cher	Loir-et-Cher	47°21′00″N 1°19′07″E	Château du Gué-Péan
La Bourdaisière	Montlouis-sur-Loire	Indre-et-Loire	47°22′11″N 0°50′19″E	Château de La Bourdaisière
La Bussière	La Bussière	Loiret	47°44′50″N 2°44′52″E	Château de La Bussière
La Farinière	Cinq-Mars-la-Pile	Indre-et-Loire	47°21′08″N 0°28′29″E	Château de La Farinière
La Ferté-Saint-Aubin	La Ferté-Saint-Aubin	Loiret	47°43′35″N 1°56′36″E	Château de La Ferté-Saint-Aubin
La Possonnière	Couture-sur-Loir	Loir-et-Cher	47°44′48″N 0°41′32″E	Château de La Possonnière
Lavardin	Lavardin	Loir-et-Cher	47°44′28″N 0°53′01″E	Château de Lavardin
Le Lude	Le Lude	Sarthe	47°38′45″N 0°09′14″E	Château du Lude
Le Moulin	Lassay-sur-Croisne	Loir-et-Cher	47°22′09″N 1°36′34″E	|
Nevers	Nevers	Nièvre	46°59′18″N 3°09′30″E	Palais ducal de Nevers
Le Plessis-Bourré	Écuillé	Maine-et-Loire	47°36′3″N 0°32′40″W	Le château du Plessis-Bourré, près du village d'Écuillé, en Maine-et-Loire (France), vu depuis le sud-est.
Le Rivau	Lemere	Indre-et-Loire	47°06′25″N 0°19′34″E	Château du Rivau
Le Roujoux	Fresnes	Loir-et-Cher	47°26′01″N 1°24′03″E	
Les Réaux	Chouzé-sur-Loire	Indre-et-Loire	47°14′54″N 0°8′52″E	Château des Réaux
Luynes	Luynes	Indre-et-Loire	47°23′28″N 0°33′19″E	Château de Luynes
Menars	Menars	Loir-et-Cher	47°38′36″N 1°24′34″E	Château de Menars
Meung-sur-Loire	Meung-sur-Loire	Loiret	47°49′26″N 1°41′41″E	Château de Meung-sur-Loire
Montgeoffroy	Mazé	Maine-et-Loire	47°28′08″N 0°16′35″W	Château de Montgeoffroy
Montigny-le-Gannelon	Montigny-le-Gannelon	Eure-et-Loir	48°00′54″N 1°14′07″E	Château de Montigny-le-Gannelon
Montpoupon	Céré-la-Ronde	Indre-et-Loire	47°15′11″N 1°8′28″E	Château de Montpoupon
Montrésor	Montrésor	Indre-et-Loire	47°9′21″N 1°12′35″E	Vue d'un château montrant une échauguette à l'angle de deux murs au premier plan.
Montreuil-Bellay	Montreuil-Bellay	Maine-et-Loire	47°07′58″N 00°09′14″W	Château de Montreuil-Bellay
Montrichard	Montrichard	Loir-et-Cher	47°20′37″N 1°11′10″E	Château de Montrichard
Saché	Saché	Indre-et-Loire	47°14′45″N 0°32′41″E	Château de Saché
Saint-Aignan	Saint-Aignan-sur-Cher	Loir-et-Cher	47°16′10″N 1°22′30″E	Château de Saint-Aignan-sur-Cher
Saint-Brisson	Saint-Brisson-sur-Loire	Loiret	47°39′00″N 2°40′56″E	
Selles-sur-Cher	Selles-sur-Cher	Loir-et-Cher	47°16′29″N 1°32′58″E	Château de Selles-sur-Cher
Serrant	Saint-Georges-sur-Loire	Maine-et-Loire	47°24′54″N 0°44′40″W	Château de Serrant
Talcy	Talcy	Loir-et-Cher	47°46′11″N 1°26′39″E	Château de Talcy (Loir et Cher)
Troussay	Cheverny	Loir-et-Cher	47°29′29″N 1°25′29″E	Château de Troussay)
Valmer	Chançay	Indre-et-Loire	47°27′32″N 0°53′14″E	Château de Valmer)
Vendôme	Vendôme	Loir-et-Cher	47°47′21″N 1°03′55″E	
Villesavin	Tour-en-Sologne	Loir-et-Cher	47°32′48″N 1°30′51″E	Château de Villesavin, vue d'est

== Map ==
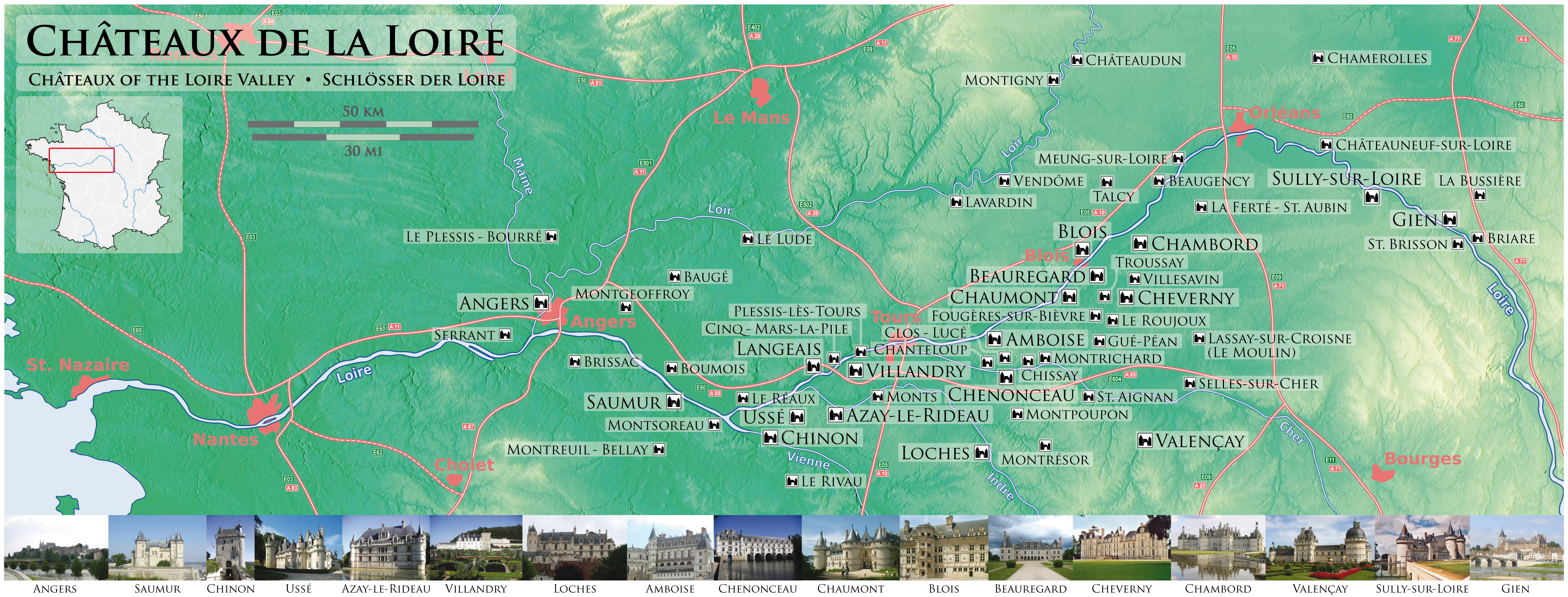
Châteaux of the Loire Valley

== See also ==
- List of châteaux in France
- Tuffeau, principal building material of the Loire Valley
- Château de la Gaudinière
