= Saint-Julien-de-Chédon =

- Commune
- Coat of arms
- Location of Saint-Julien-de-Chédon
- Location within France Location within Centre-Val de Loire
- Coordinates: 47°19′42″N 1°12′12″E
- Country: France
- Region: Centre-Val de Loire
- Department: Loir-et-Cher
- Arrondissement: Romorantin-Lanthenay
- Canton: Montrichard Val de Cher
- Intercommunality: Val-de-Cher-Controis

Government
  - Mayor (2020–2026): Michel Leplard
- Area^{1}: 9.87 km^{2} (3.81 sq mi)
- Elevation: 90 m (300 ft)
- Highest elevation: 159 m (522 ft)
- Lowest elevation: 59 m (194 ft)
- Population (2023): 791
  - Density: 80.1/km^{2} (208/sq mi)
- Time zone: UTC+01:00 (CET)
  - Summer (DST): UTC+02:00 (CEST)
- INSEE/Postal code: 41217 /41400
- ^{1} French Land Register data, which excludes lakes, ponds, glaciers > 1 km^{2} (0.386 sq mi or 247 acres) and river estuaries.

Saint-Julien-de-Chédon (French pronunciation: [sɛ̃ ʒyljɛ̃ də ʃedɔ̃]) is a commune in the Loir-et-Cher department of central France.

== Population ==
Historical population
Year	Pop.	±% p.a.
1968	560	—
1975	639	+1.90%
1982	717	+1.66%
1990	733	+0.28%
1999	698	−0.54%
2007	715	+0.30%
2012	738	+0.64%
2017	756	+0.48%
2023	791	+0.76%
Source: INSEE

== See also ==
- Communes of the Loir-et-Cher department
