= Château des Réaux =

French medieval castle

Coordinates: 47.2479°N 0.1481°E

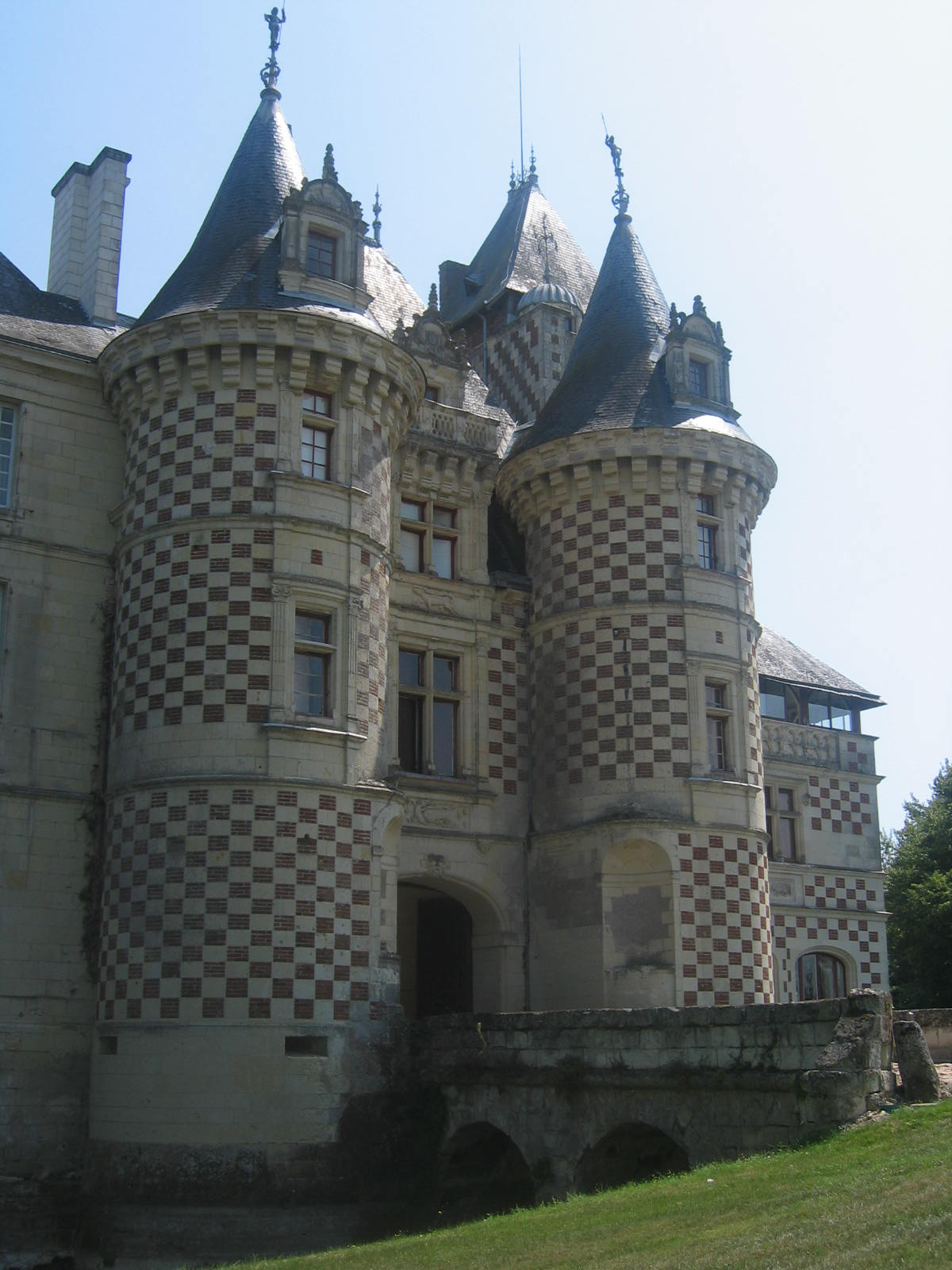
Château des Réaux

The Château des Réaux is a French medieval castle located in the commune Chouzé-sur-Loire in the Indre-et-Loire department in the Centre-Val de Loire region. It has been listed as a historic monument since 1930.

== History ==
The Château des Réaux castle had been in possession, in the fourteenth century, of Amaury Péau, Jeanne de Montejean, Countess of Sancerre, Antoine de Breuil and Gilles de Brye in 1455. Ruined in the fifteenth century, it was acquired by the Grand Father Jean Briçonnet, first mayor of Tours. The influence of the old fortified castle appears on the general plan of the building: it is situated on an island totally surrounded by a large water ditch which served for security reinforcement. The present castle was built on the site of the old fortified castle by the grandson Jean Briçonnet, son of Guillaume Briçonnet, lord of the sites then called Plessis-Rideau. He was also inhabited by Thibaut de Longuejoue and their descendants, the family Taveau. In 1595 a marriage has brought the castle into possession of the Béraudière family. François de La Béraudière has inherited it and then sold for an amount of one hundred and fifteen thousand pounds in 1650 to the writer and poet Tallemant des Réaux for whom the castle became home and his family name was attributed to the castle since the 30 of July 1653 by a royal charter of the king

== Contemporary art gallery (permanent exhibition) ==
Inside the Château des Réaux castle is inaugurated a paintings gallery (permanent exhibition) devoted to the topic of men's and women's legs, entitled "Legs of men and women in the Art of the third millennium". The main conception of this contemporary art gallery and exhibition is to "boost the creative research and make the topic of the exhibition to become the main subject of the works".

The content of the gallery, 760 paintings of 530 painters from over 40 countries of the world, is the result of an international competition which was launched in 2007. This exhibition was created as a part of preparations for celebration of the sixth century of the Château des Réaux castle foundation. The contemporary art gallery in the Château des Réaux castle was awarded by the "Merit and Dedication to the Arts" diploma issued by the Mazarine Academy. The paintings exhibition is available for individual and collective visits (including guided visits) all year round.

The paintings were selected according to their compliance with the four subdivisions of the main topic:

- "Classic and charming" legs of the 3rd millennium
- A humorous or satirical look at contemporary legs
- The evolution of men's legs until today
- A personal vision of the painter of the four legs of two persons on the same work

Among several painters who have sent their works are: Béatrice Le Limantour, Konstantin Altunin, Annalisa Avancini, Javier Azurdia, Stefan Burger, Ghyslaine Chirat-Leonelli, Sylvain Dez, Giovanni Faccioli, Eva Fellner, Olga Glumcher, Mel Ramos, Susan Jillette - SooZ, Raffaella Vaccari and many other.

== See also ==
- Chouzé-sur-Loire
- Indre-et-Loire
- Centre-Val de Loire
- Loire Valley

== Images ==
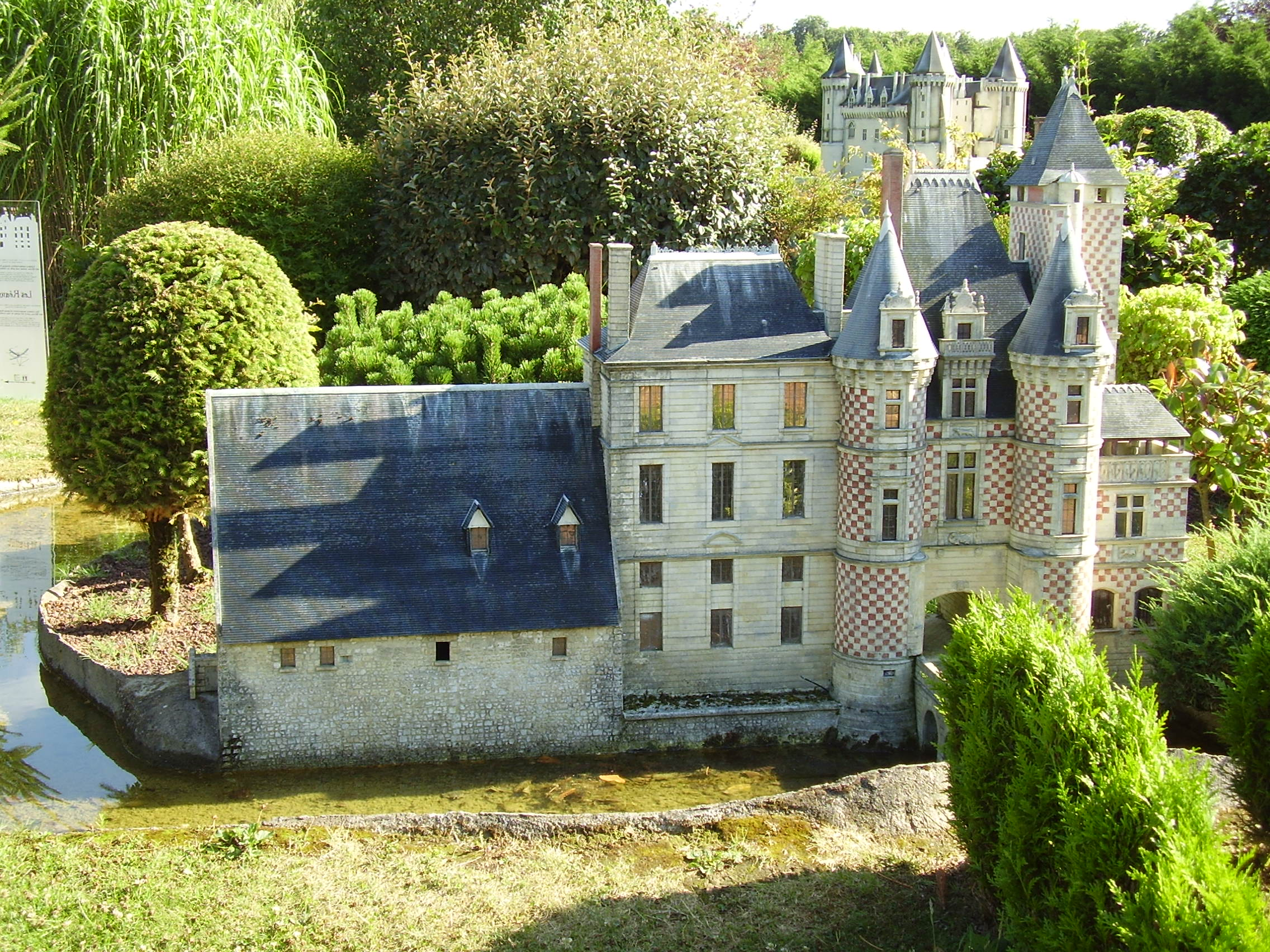
Mini-model of the Château des Réaux castle

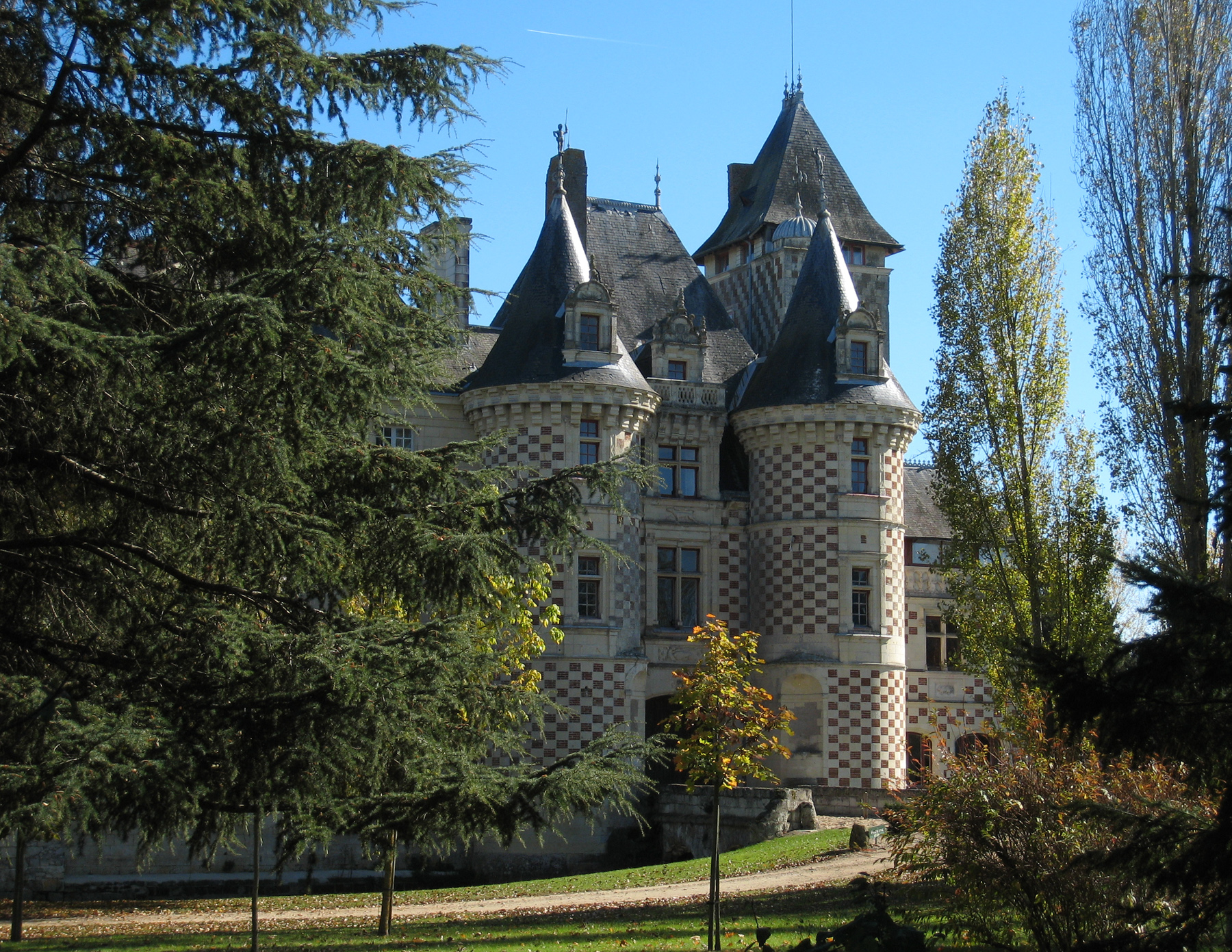
Château des Réaux castle, view from the adjacent park

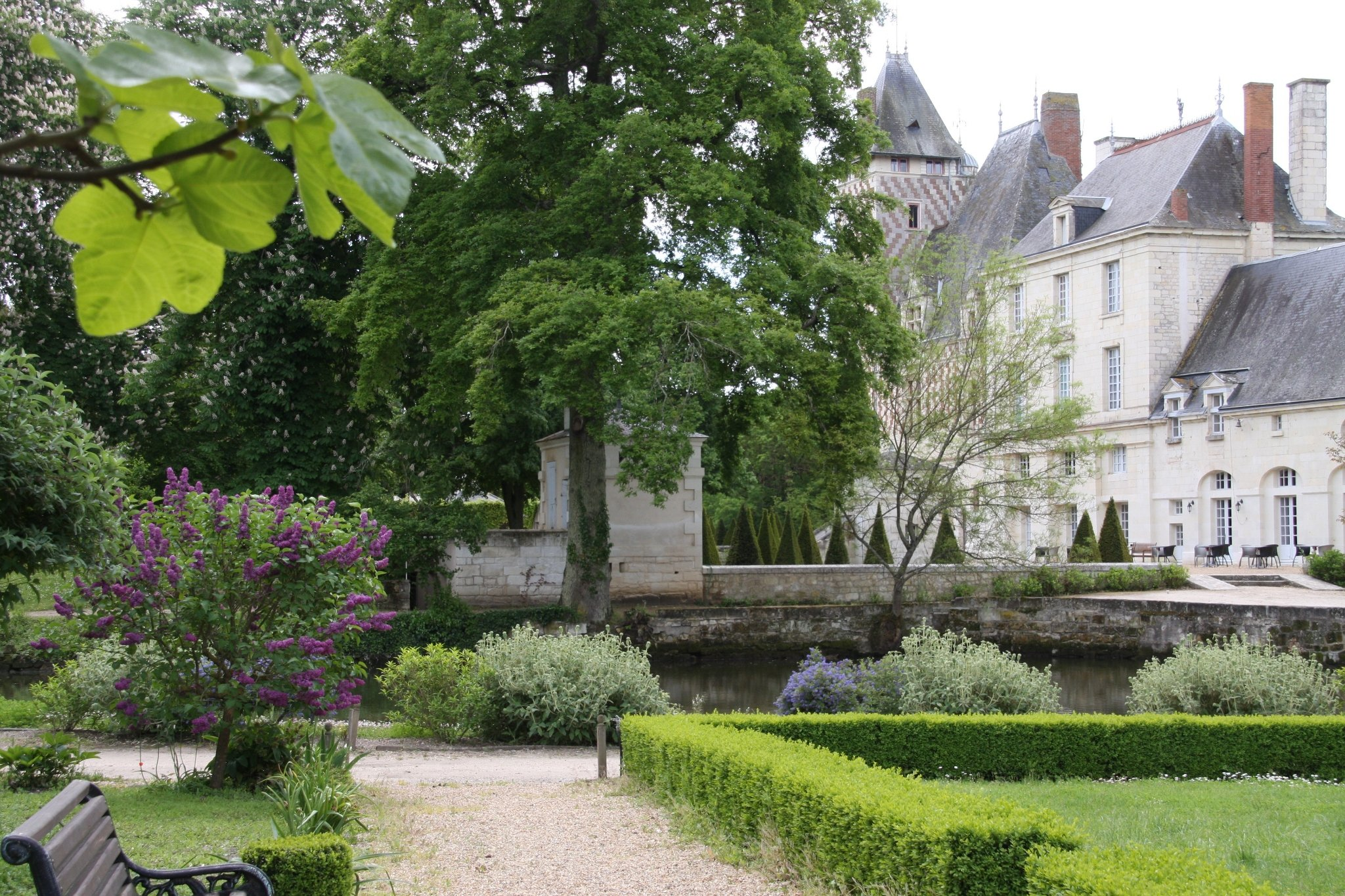
Lilac in the Jean Brisonne park

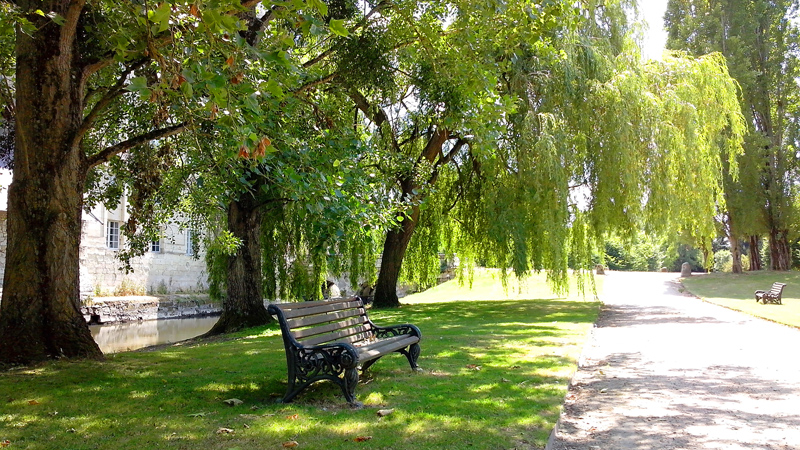
Willow in the park

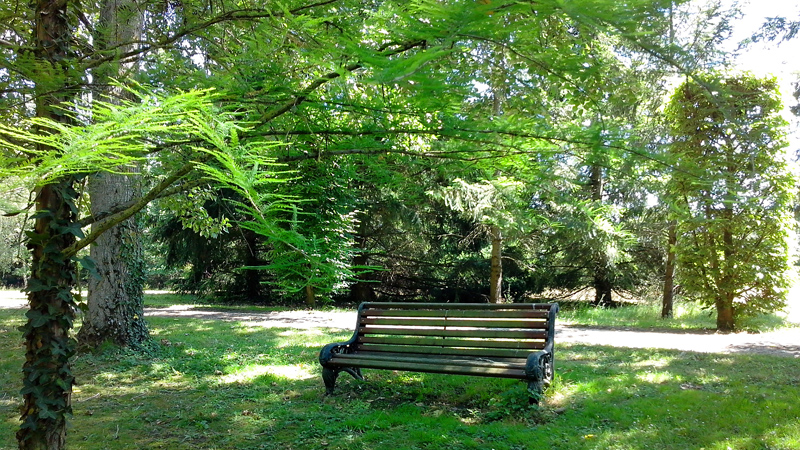
Jean Brisonne park

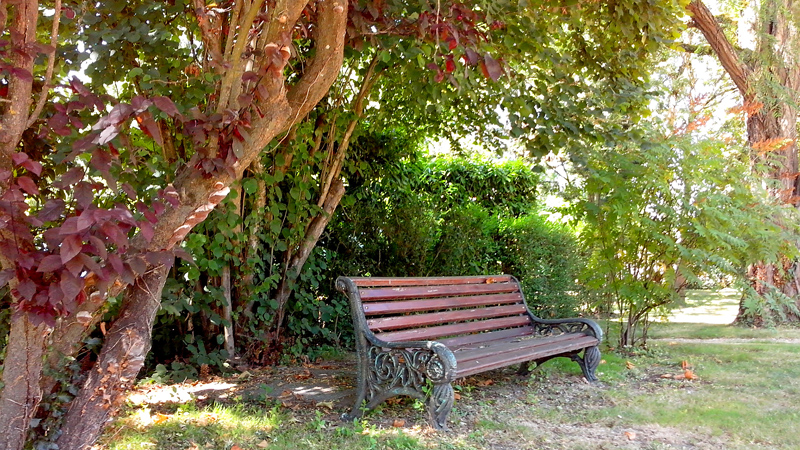
Bench in the park

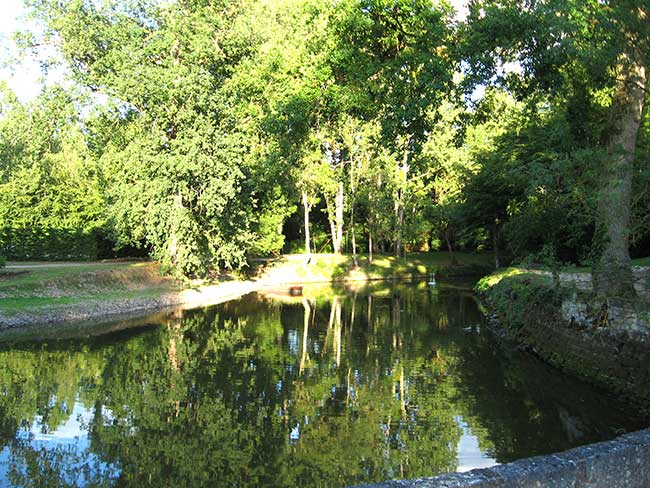
Pond in the park
