= Oisly =

- Commune
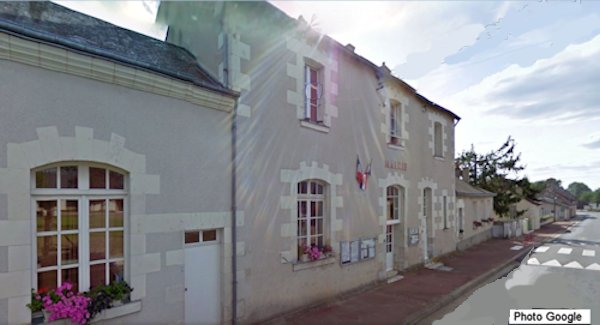
- Town hall

- Coat of arms
- Location of Oisly
- Location within France Location within Centre-Val de Loire
- Coordinates: 47°23′25″N 1°22′41″E
- Country: France
- Region: Centre-Val de Loire
- Department: Loir-et-Cher
- Arrondissement: Romorantin-Lanthenay
- Canton: Montrichard Val de Cher
- Intercommunality: Val-de-Cher-Controis

Government
  - Mayor (2026–32): Cécile Gomes Recchia
- Area^{1}: 10.61 km^{2} (4.10 sq mi)
- Elevation: 120 m (390 ft)
- Highest elevation: 131 m (430 ft)
- Lowest elevation: 98 m (322 ft)
- Population (2023): 392
  - Density: 36.9/km^{2} (95.7/sq mi)
- Time zone: UTC+01:00 (CET)
  - Summer (DST): UTC+02:00 (CEST)
- INSEE/Postal code: 41166 /41700
- ^{1} French Land Register data, which excludes lakes, ponds, glaciers > 1 km^{2} (0.386 sq mi or 247 acres) and river estuaries.

Oisly (French pronunciation: [wali]) is a commune in the Loir-et-Cher department of central France.

== Population ==
Historical population
Year	Pop.	±% p.a.
1968	399	—
1975	350	−1.85%
1982	316	−1.45%
1990	319	+0.12%
1999	310	−0.32%
2007	333	+0.90%
2012	351	+1.06%
2017	377	+1.44%
2023	392	+0.65%
Source: INSEE

== See also ==
- Communes of the Loir-et-Cher department
