= Couddes =

- Commune
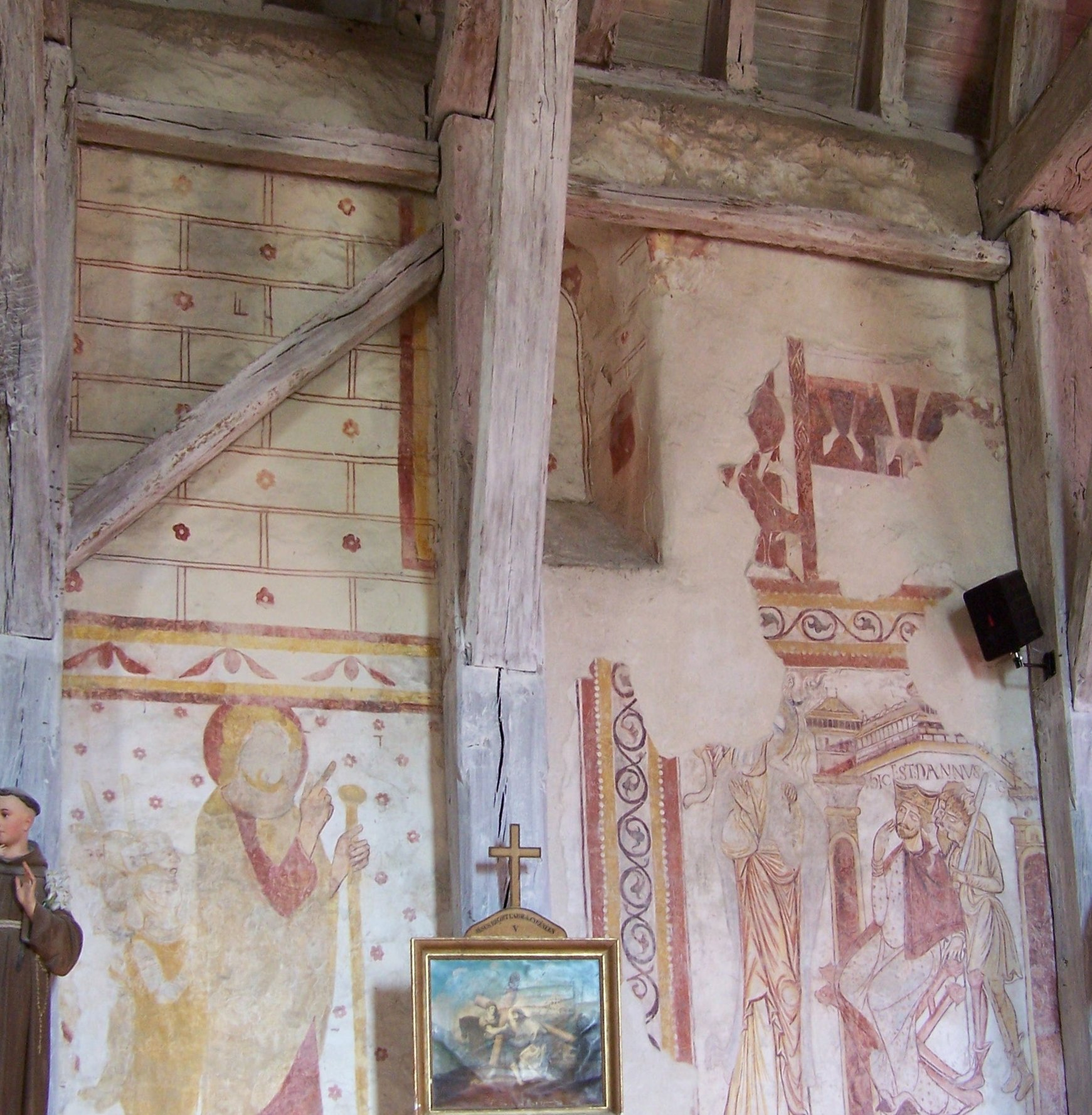
- Fresco in the church
- Location of Couddes
- Location within France Location within Centre-Val de Loire
- Coordinates: 47°21′51″N 1°24′16″E
- Country: France
- Region: Centre-Val de Loire
- Department: Loir-et-Cher
- Arrondissement: Romorantin-Lanthenay
- Canton: Montrichard Val de Cher
- Intercommunality: Val-de-Cher-Controis

Government
  - Mayor (2020–2026): Jean-Pierre Rabusseau
- Area^{1}: 18.64 km^{2} (7.20 sq mi)
- Elevation: 91 m (299 ft)
- Highest elevation: 119 m (390 ft)
- Lowest elevation: 94 m (308 ft)
- Population (2023): 530
  - Density: 28/km^{2} (74/sq mi)
- Time zone: UTC+01:00 (CET)
  - Summer (DST): UTC+02:00 (CEST)
- INSEE/Postal code: 41062 /41700
- ^{1} French Land Register data, which excludes lakes, ponds, glaciers > 1 km^{2} (0.386 sq mi or 247 acres) and river estuaries.

Couddes (French pronunciation: [kud]) is a commune in the Loir-et-Cher department of central France.

== Population ==
Historical population
Year	Pop.	±% p.a.
1968	528	—
1975	518	−0.27%
1982	520	+0.06%
1990	485	−0.87%
1999	486	+0.02%
2007	517	+0.78%
2012	519	+0.08%
2017	546	+1.02%
2023	530	−0.49%
Source: INSEE

== See also ==
- Communes of the Loir-et-Cher department
