= Château de la Gaudinière =

Château in Nantes, France

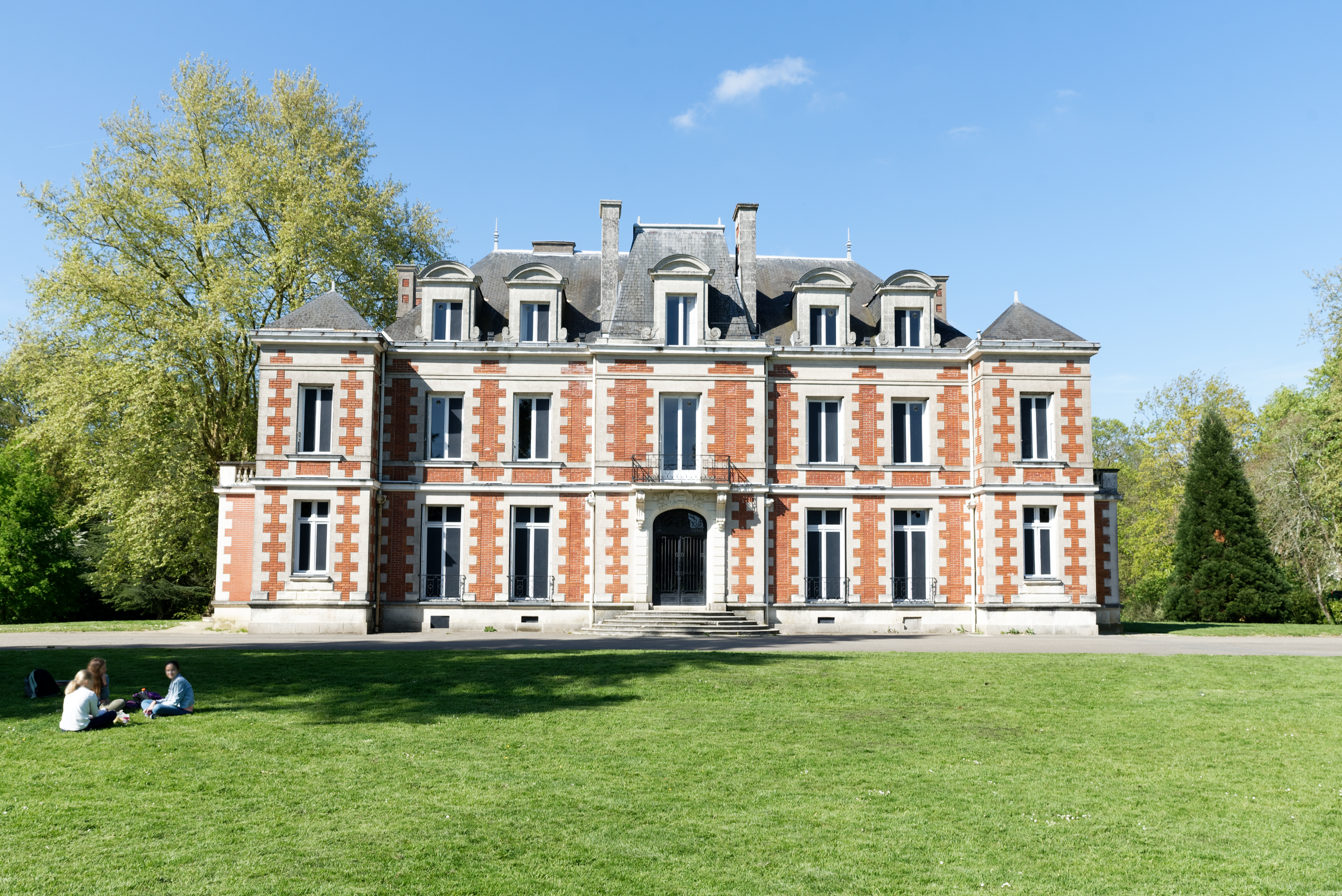
- The château and its park.
- Interactive map of the Château de la Gaudinière area

General information
- Type: Château
- Location: Nantes, Loire-Atlantique, France
- Coordinates: 47.243438°N 1.578231°W
- Construction started: 18th century
- Completed: 19th century
- Owner: City of Nantes

Design and construction
- Architect: Léon Lenoir

The Château de la Gaudinière is a château located in Nantes, in the Breil-Barberie district, France.

== History ==
The Château de la Gaudinière was constructed in the 18th century. Before the French Revolution, it was owned by Louis Chaurand, a wealthy Nantes shipowner with connections to the Beauharnais and Tascher de la Pagerie families.

In 1814, the château passed to the d'Aux family, then to the Perrien family. During the Restoration, it was acquired by the Goüin family, friends, and former neighbors of Balzac in Tours. The estate then included a main residence with a courtyard of honor, a chapel, an English-style garden with an orangery, an orchard with a pond, and a wooded area. It provided an ideal setting for a gentleman farmer interested in the emerging trend of ornamental gardens and exotic plants from the Americas, such as magnolias and bald cypresses.

In 1857, the château and its park were purchased by banker J. Brousset, a relative of the Goüin family. The 8-hectare park underwent significant expansions and enhancements with the collaboration of landscape architect Provost. Between 1864 and 1873, Brousset commissioned architect Léon Lenoir to construct the current château on the site of the previous residence, though it has since undergone substantial alterations. The red brick façade contrasts with the white tuffeau stone typically used in Nantes' follies and grand bourgeois residences along the Erdre River. In 1864, a giant sequoia from North America was planted near the château in the upper park, which expanded to 17 hectares by 1881.

In 1918, the Belot family, another banking dynasty, acquired the estate and restored the park with the assistance of the Lizé brothers, renowned Nantes horticulturist-landscapers. They sold the park to the city of Nantes in 1936, part of which was used to create the Pont du Cens Cemetery. The château and its immediate surroundings were sold to the Fondation d'Auteuil in 1942.

In 1948, the Caisse régionale d'assurance maladie (CRAM) acquired the property to establish a functional rehabilitation center, adding 7,500 square meters of new buildings over the years. However, located in a wooded area, further expansion was not feasible, making relocation inevitable.

In 1992, the city of Nantes repurchased the château and its surroundings, demolishing the CRAM buildings to restore the château's original exterior appearance. As of the early 21st century, the château remains unoccupied.

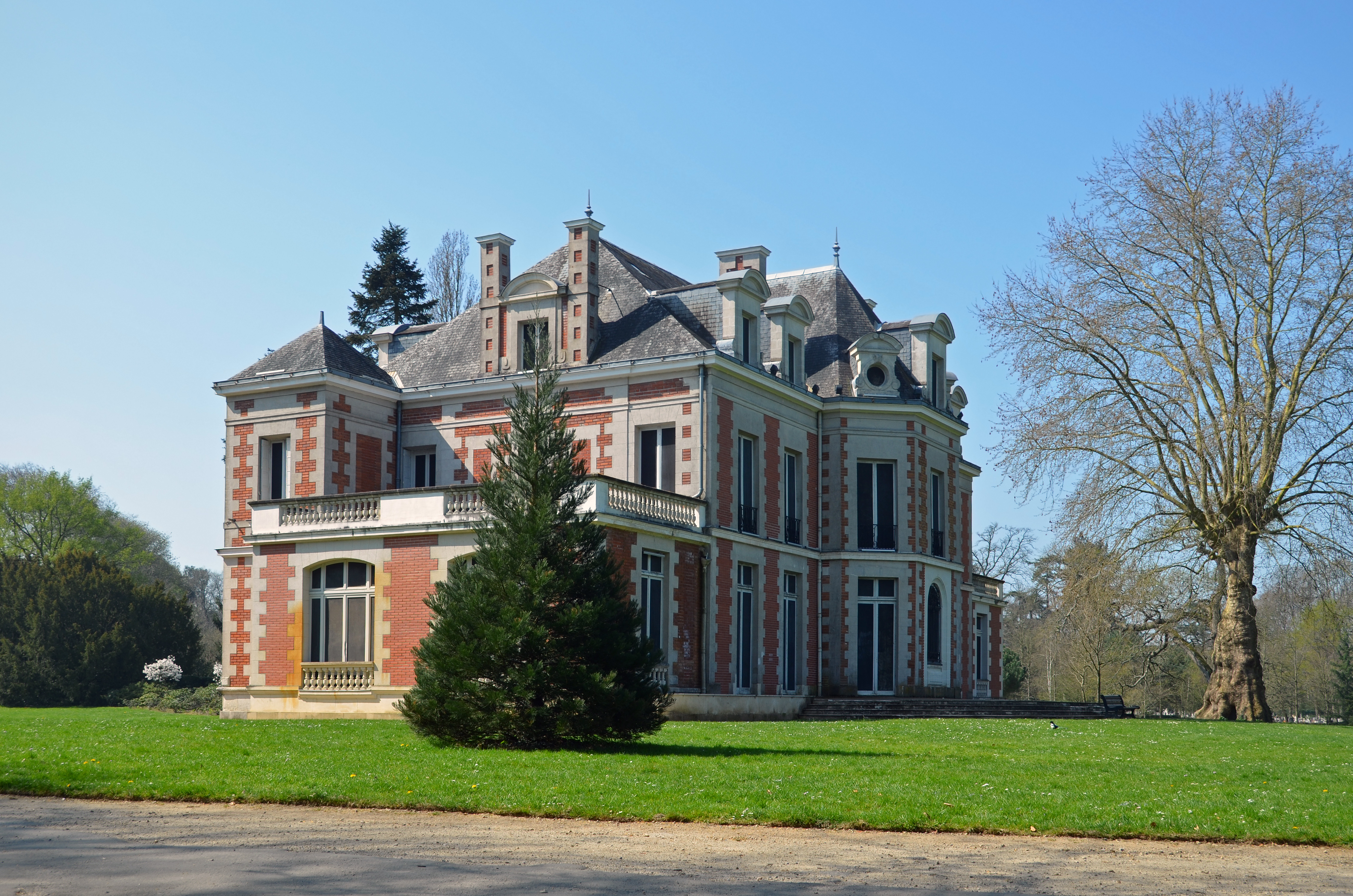
Château from the park

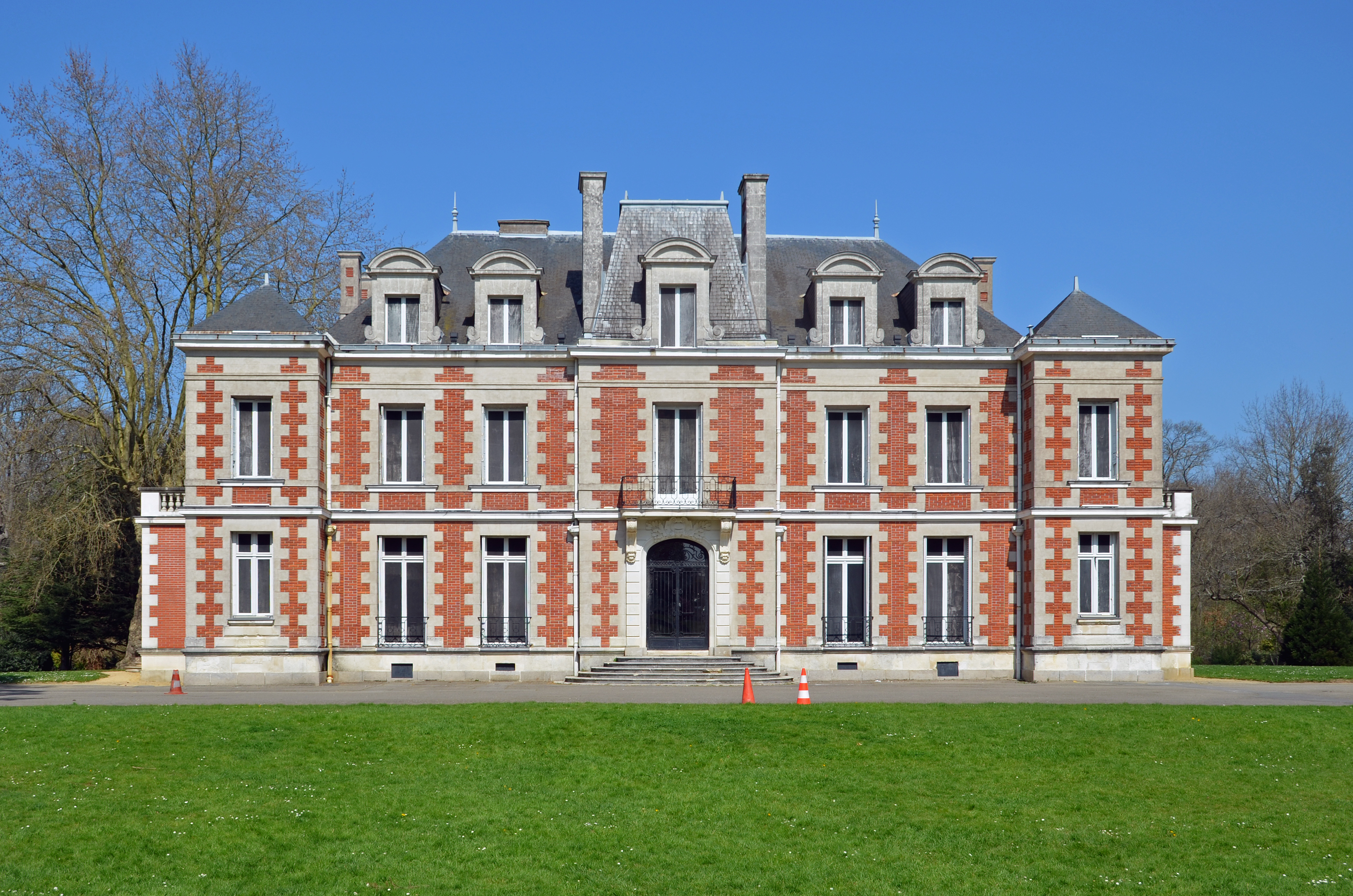
Chateau on the park side.

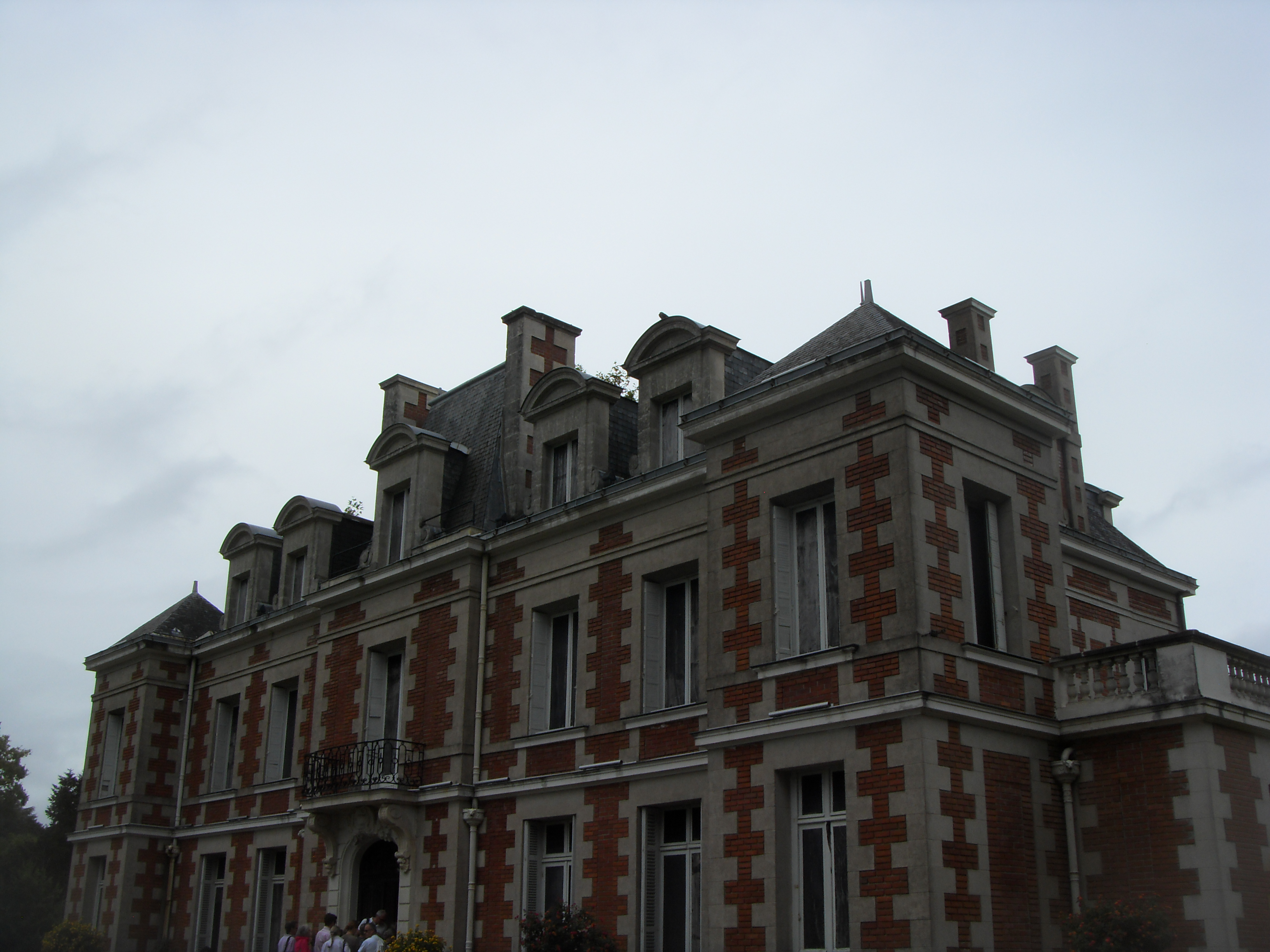

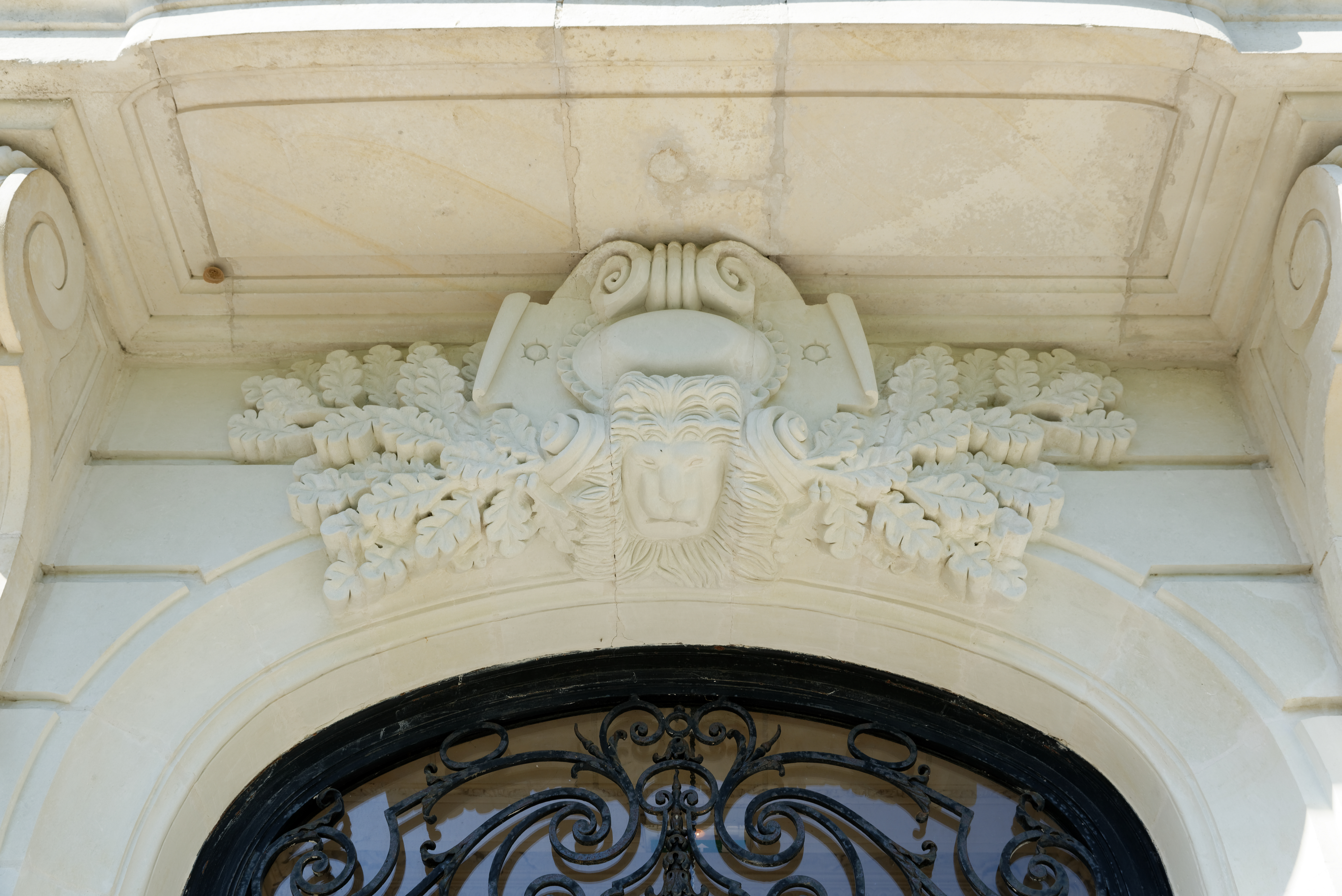
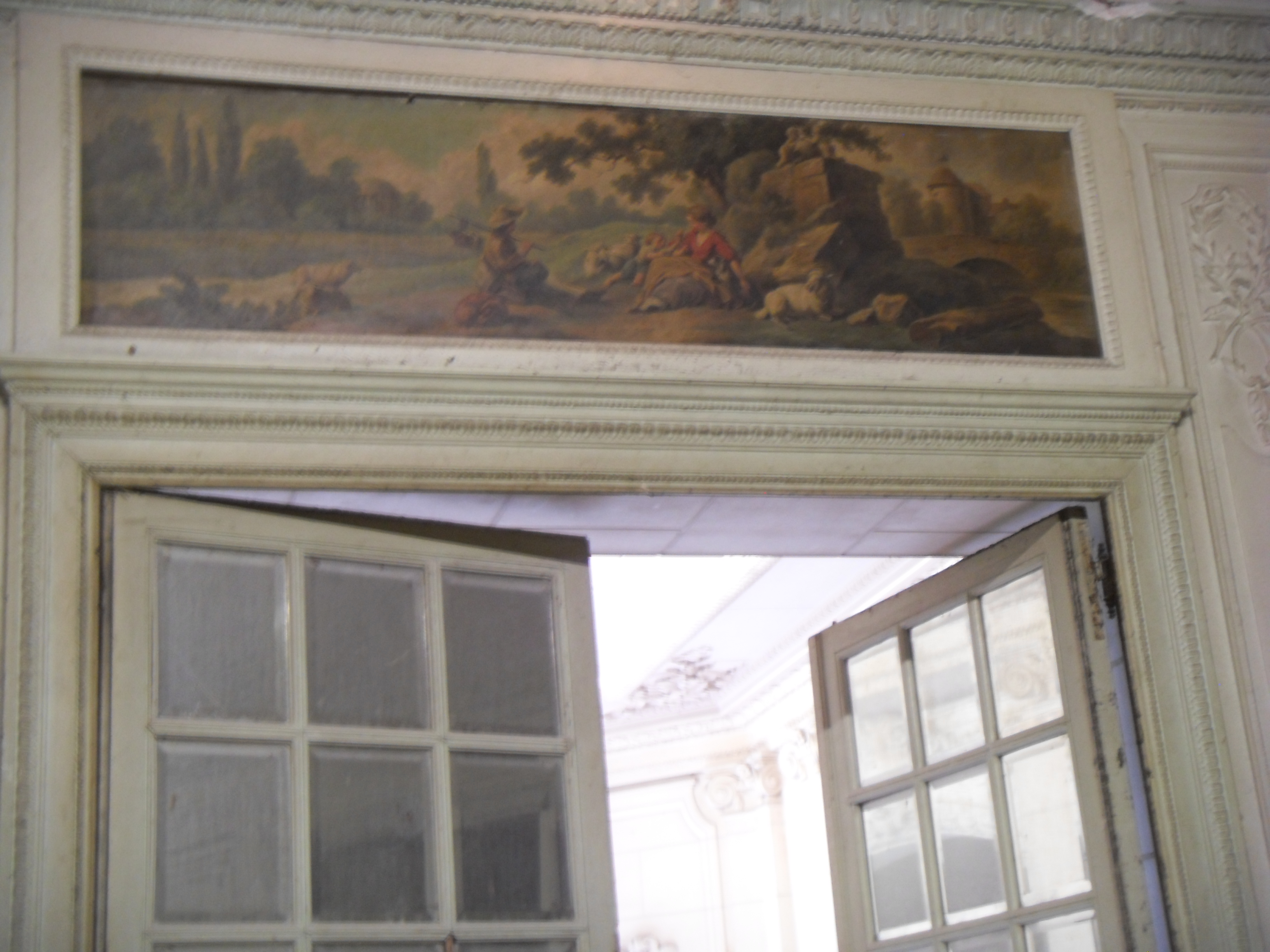

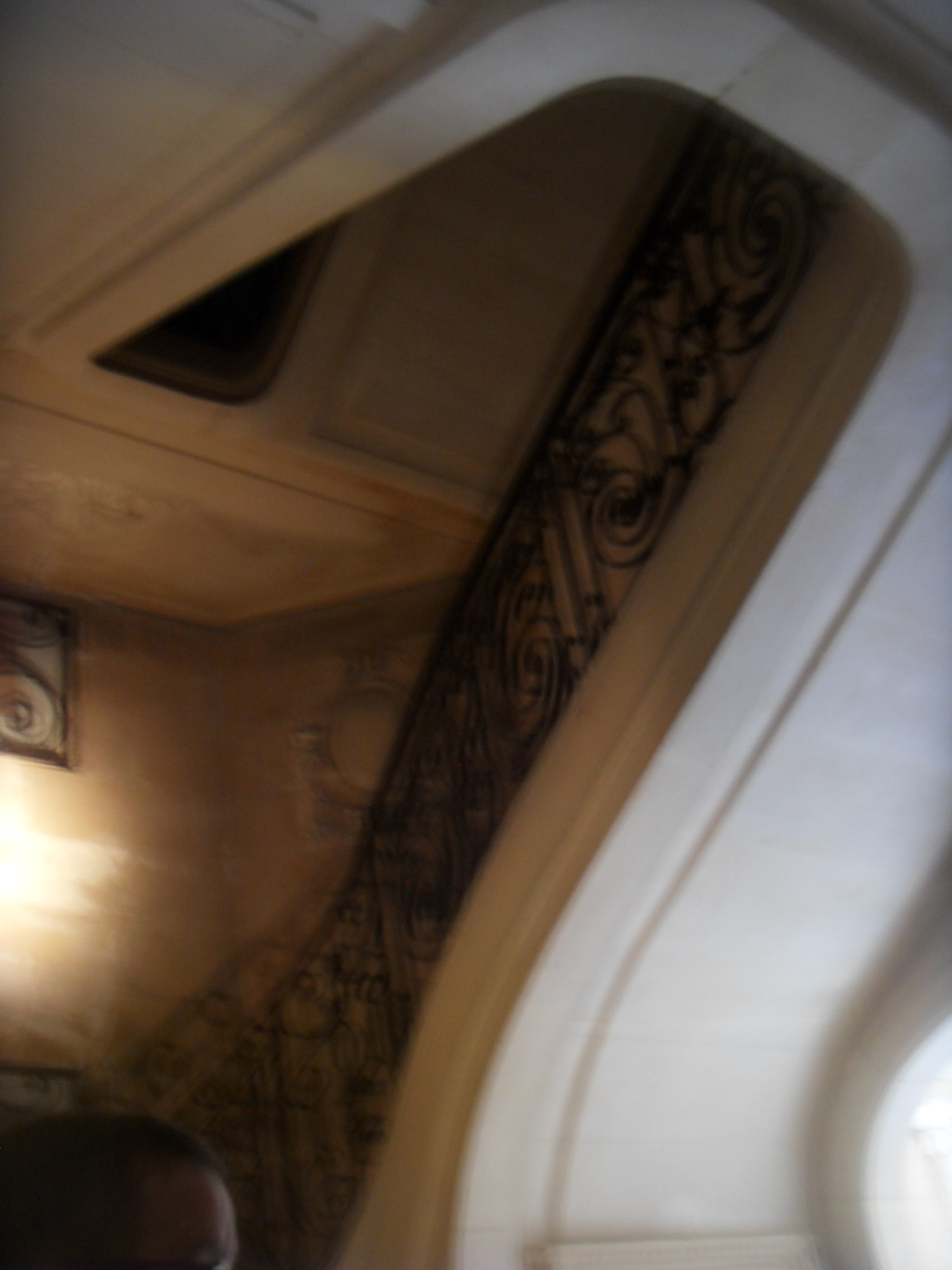

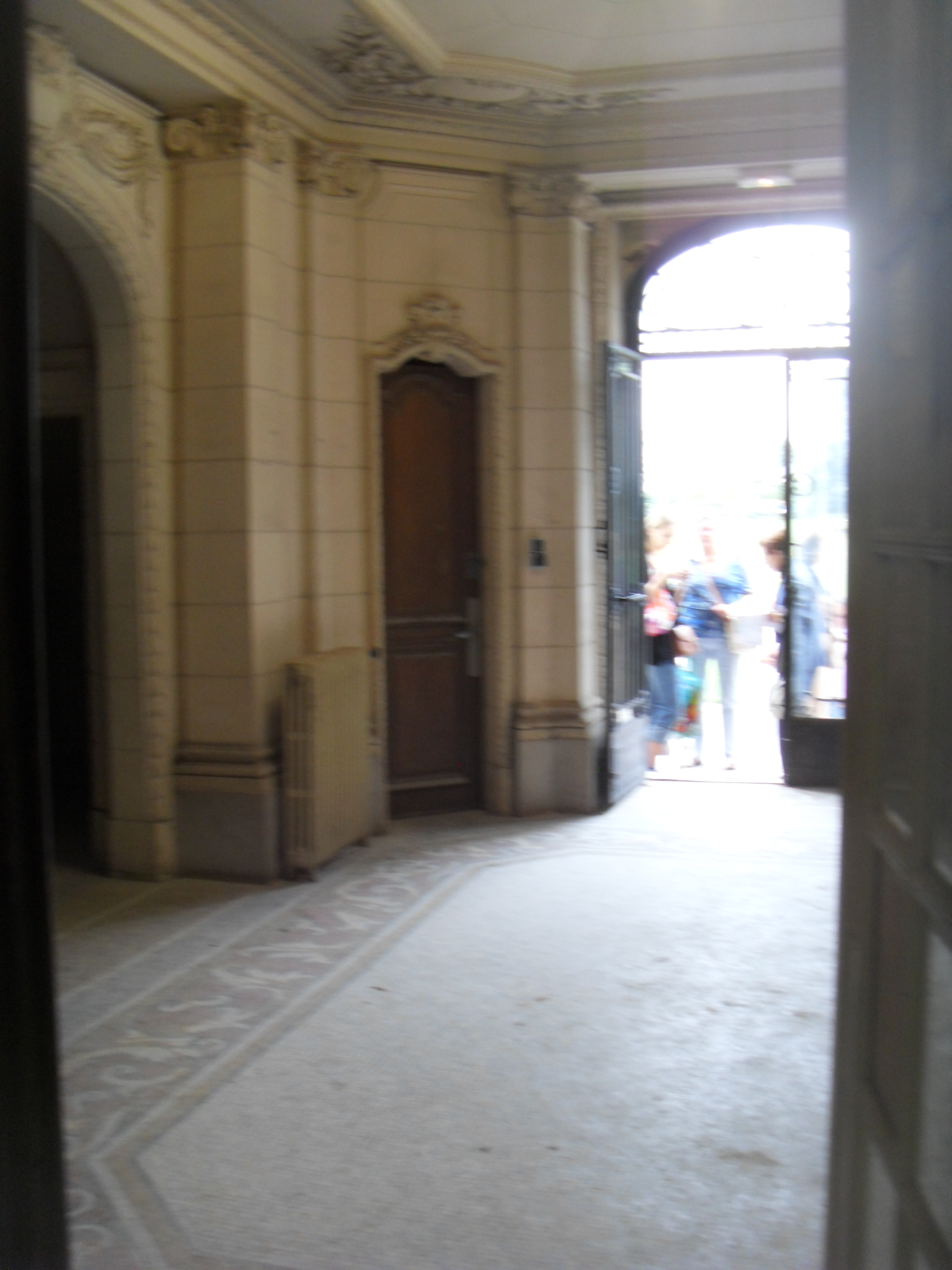

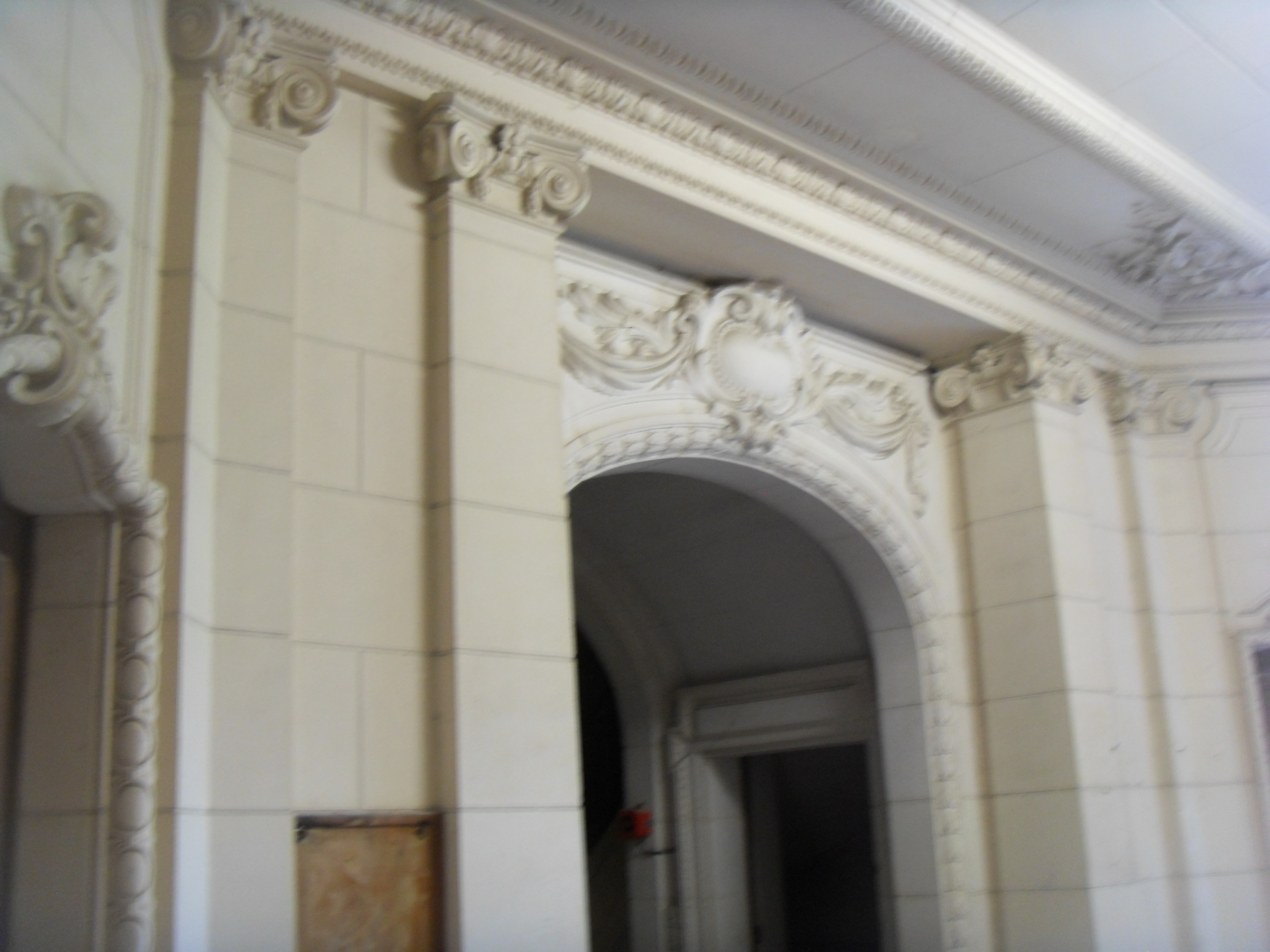

== Park ==
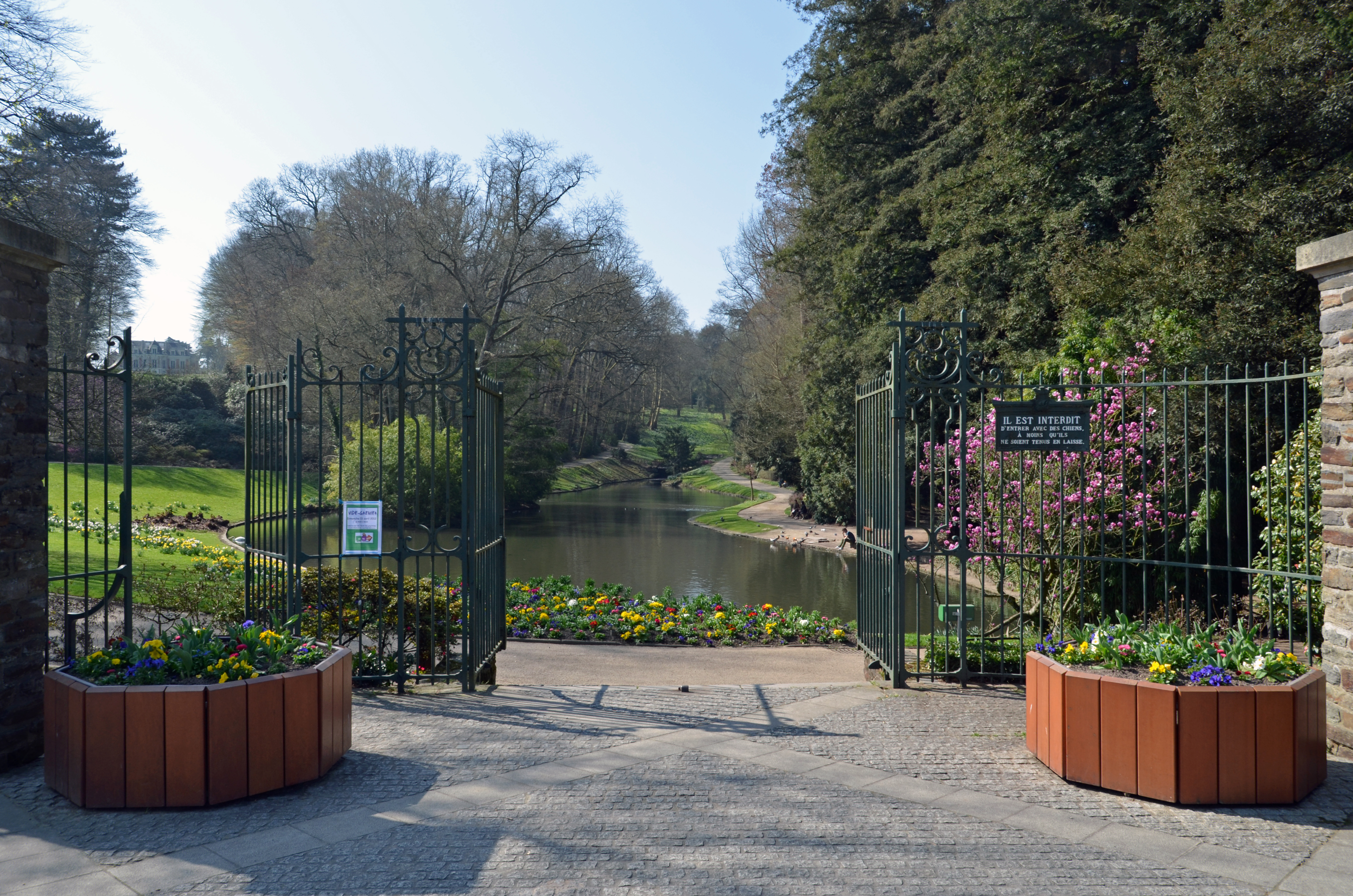

View of the park

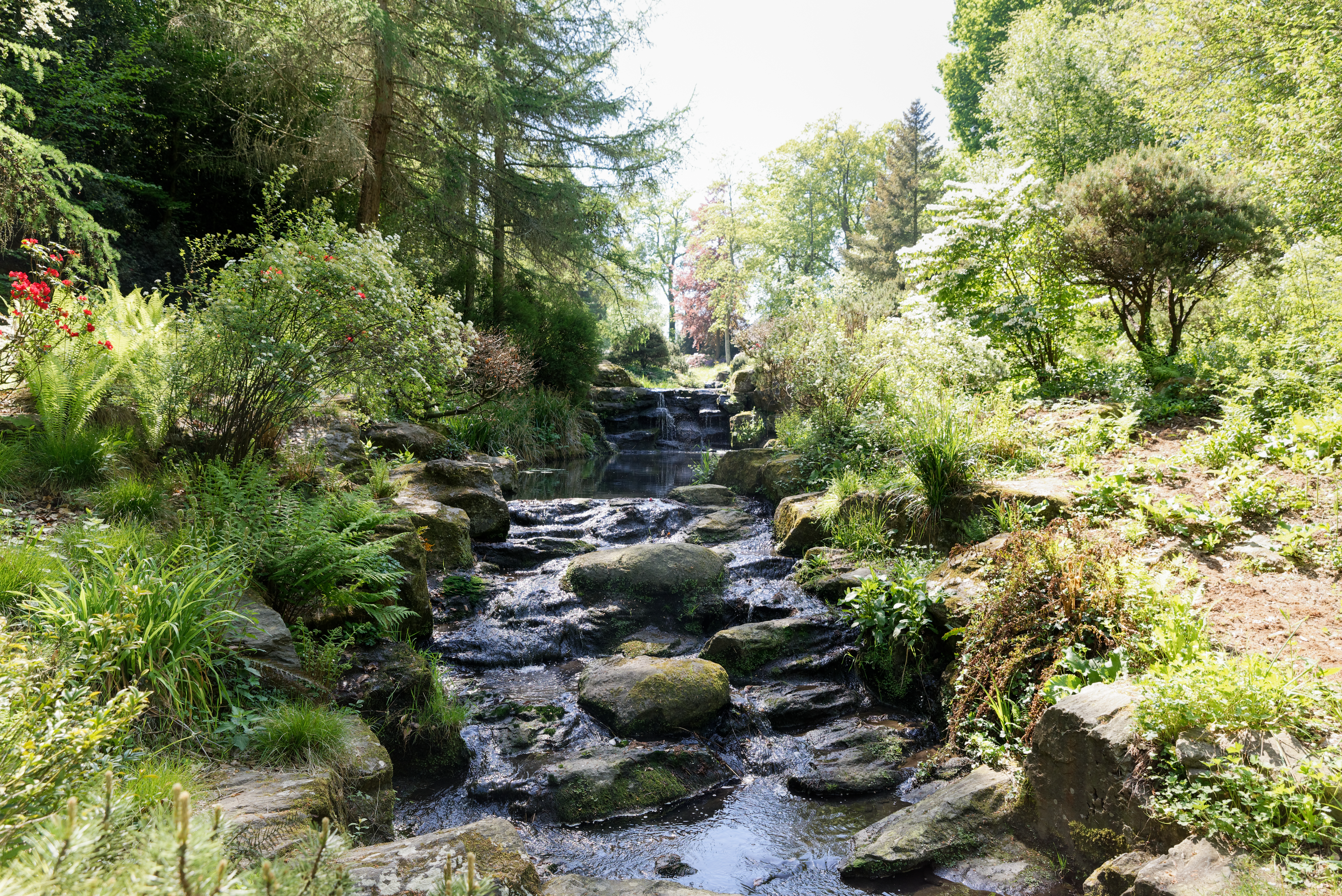

== See also ==
- Pont du Cens Cemetery
- History of Nantes
- Châteaux of the Loire Valley
- English landscape garden

== Bibliography ==
- Abed-Denesle, Loïc (2009). "Le parc de la Gaudinière, deux siècles d'histoire" [The Parc de la Gaudinière, two centuries of history]. Nantes au quotidien, supplément à Nantes Passion (in French) (194). Nantes: Mairie de Nantes. ISSN 1764-1128.
- Renaudineau, Jean (2008). "Le parc de la Gaudinière (1)" [The Parc de la Gaudinière (1)]. Seve Info (1505). Nantes: Service des espaces verts de la ville de Nantes.
- Renaudineau, Jean (2008). "Le parc de la Gaudinière (2)" [The Parc de la Gaudinière (2)] (PDF). Seve Info (1506). Nantes: Service des espaces verts de la ville de Nantes.
- Renaudineau, Jean (2008). "Le parc de la Gaudinière (3)" [The Parc de la Gaudinière (3)] (PDF). Seve Info (1507). Nantes: Service des espaces verts de la ville de Nantes.
