= Faverolles-sur-Cher =

- Commune
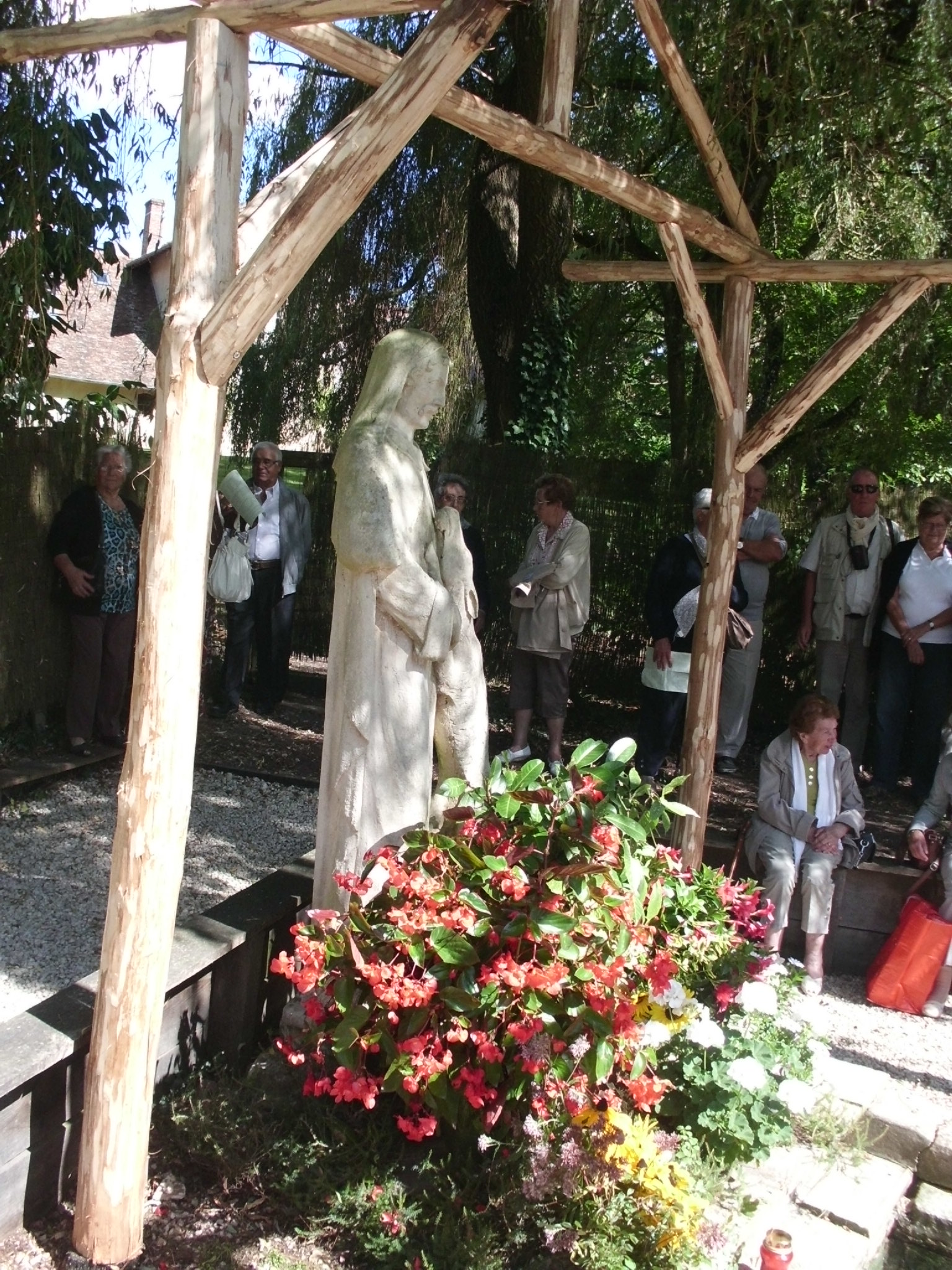
- Statue of Saint Gilles

- Coat of arms
- Location of Faverolles-sur-Cher
- Location within France Location within Centre-Val de Loire
- Coordinates: 47°19′20″N 1°11′11″E
- Country: France
- Region: Centre-Val de Loire
- Department: Loir-et-Cher
- Arrondissement: Romorantin-Lanthenay
- Canton: Montrichard Val de Cher

Government
  - Mayor (2021–2026): Olivier Racault
- Area^{1}: 15.51 km^{2} (5.99 sq mi)
- Elevation: 70 m (230 ft)
- Highest elevation: 146 m (479 ft)
- Lowest elevation: 57 m (187 ft)
- Population (2023): 1,408
  - Density: 90.78/km^{2} (235.1/sq mi)
- Time zone: UTC+01:00 (CET)
  - Summer (DST): UTC+02:00 (CEST)
- INSEE/Postal code: 41080 /41400
- ^{1} French Land Register data, which excludes lakes, ponds, glaciers > 1 km^{2} (0.386 sq mi or 247 acres) and river estuaries.

Faverolles-sur-Cher (French pronunciation: [favʁɔl syʁ ʃɛʁ], literally Faverolles on Cher) is a commune in the Loir-et-Cher department of central France.

== Population ==
Historical population
Year	Pop.	±% p.a.
1968	762	—
1975	807	+0.82%
1982	1,008	+3.23%
1990	1,056	+0.58%
1999	1,120	+0.66%
2007	1,251	+1.39%
2012	1,305	+0.85%
2017	1,386	+1.21%
2023	1,408	+0.26%
Source: INSEE

== See also ==
- Communes of the Loir-et-Cher department
