= Sassay =

- Commune
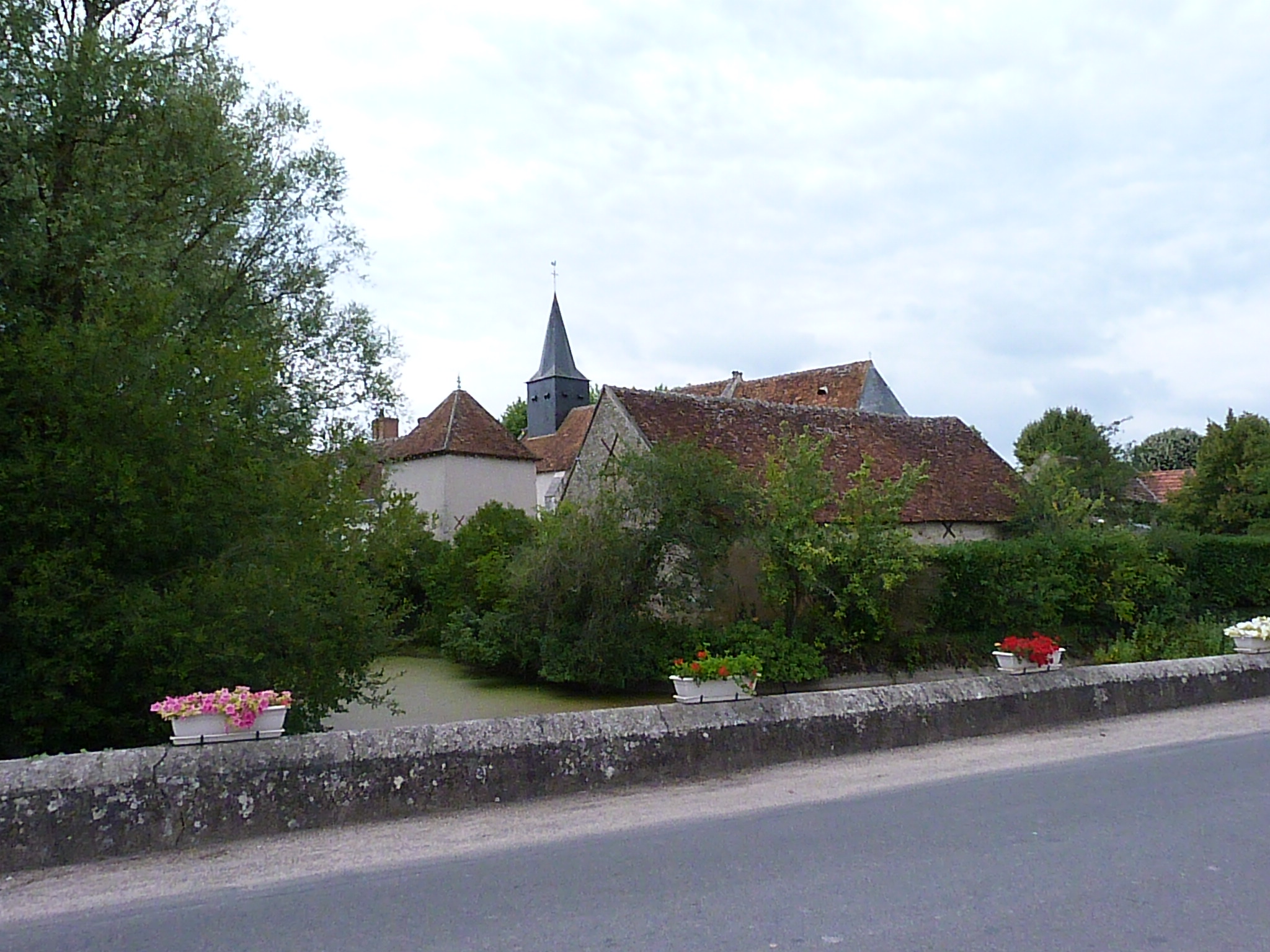
- Location of Sassay
- Location within France Location within Centre-Val de Loire
- Coordinates: 47°23′38″N 1°26′33″E
- Country: France
- Region: Centre-Val de Loire
- Department: Loir-et-Cher
- Arrondissement: Romorantin-Lanthenay
- Canton: Montrichard Val de Cher
- Intercommunality: Val-de-Cher-Controis

Government
  - Mayor (2020–2026): Jean-Pierre Charles-Guimpied
- Area^{1}: 16.44 km^{2} (6.35 sq mi)
- Elevation: 112 m (367 ft)
- Highest elevation: 137 m (449 ft)
- Lowest elevation: 99 m (325 ft)
- Population (2023): 1,142
  - Density: 69.46/km^{2} (179.9/sq mi)
- Time zone: UTC+01:00 (CET)
  - Summer (DST): UTC+02:00 (CEST)
- INSEE/Postal code: 41237 /41700
- ^{1} French Land Register data, which excludes lakes, ponds, glaciers > 1 km^{2} (0.386 sq mi or 247 acres) and river estuaries.

Sassay (French pronunciation: [sasɛ]) is a commune in the Loir-et-Cher department in central France.

== Population ==
Historical population
Year	Pop.	±% p.a.
1968	640	—
1975	580	−1.40%
1982	567	−0.32%
1990	584	+0.37%
1999	730	+2.51%
2007	865	+2.14%
2012	939	+1.66%
2017	1,023	+1.73%
2023	1,142	+1.85%
Source: INSEE

== See also ==
- Communes of the Loir-et-Cher department
