= Canton of Montrichard Val de Cher =

French administrative division

Coordinates: 47.35°N 1.18°E

The canton of Montrichard Val de Cher (before 2021: Montrichard) is an administrative division of the Loir-et-Cher department, central France. Its borders were modified at the French canton reorganisation which came into effect in March 2015. Its seat is in Montrichard Val de Cher.

It consists of the following communes:

1. Chissay-en-Touraine
2. Choussy
3. Le Controis-en-Sologne (partly)
4. Couddes
5. Faverolles-sur-Cher
6. Fresnes
7. Monthou-sur-Cher
8. Montrichard Val de Cher
9. Oisly
10. Pontlevoy
11. Saint-Georges-sur-Cher
12. Saint-Julien-de-Chédon
13. Sassay
14. Vallières-les-Grandes
