= Choussy =

- Commune
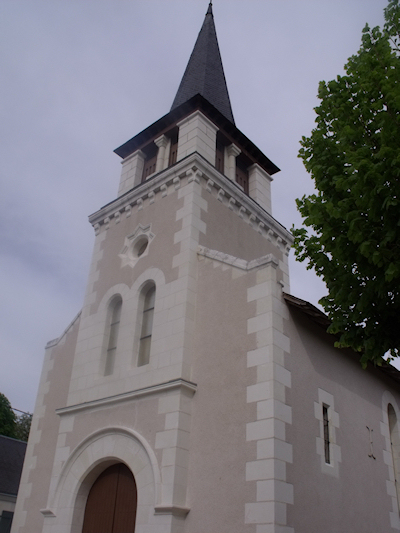

- Coat of arms
- Location of Choussy
- Location within France Location within Centre-Val de Loire
- Coordinates: 47°22′27″N 1°20′51″E
- Country: France
- Region: Centre-Val de Loire
- Department: Loir-et-Cher
- Arrondissement: Romorantin-Lanthenay
- Canton: Montrichard Val de Cher

Government
  - Mayor (2020–2026): Thierry Gosseaume
- Area^{1}: 15.45 km^{2} (5.97 sq mi)
- Elevation: 69 m (226 ft)
- Highest elevation: 117 m (384 ft)
- Lowest elevation: 80 m (260 ft)
- Population (2023): 351
  - Density: 22.7/km^{2} (58.8/sq mi)
- Time zone: UTC+01:00 (CET)
  - Summer (DST): UTC+02:00 (CEST)
- INSEE/Postal code: 41054 /41700
- ^{1} French Land Register data, which excludes lakes, ponds, glaciers > 1 km^{2} (0.386 sq mi or 247 acres) and river estuaries.

Choussy (French pronunciation: [ʃusi]) is a commune in the Loir-et-Cher department of central France.

== Population ==
Historical population
Year	Pop.	±% p.a.
1968	232	—
1975	206	−1.68%
1982	228	+1.46%
1990	240	+0.64%
1999	234	−0.28%
2007	312	+3.66%
2012	341	+1.79%
2017	338	−0.18%
2023	351	+0.63%
Source: INSEE

== See also ==
- Communes of the Loir-et-Cher department
