= Vallières-les-Grandes =

- Commune
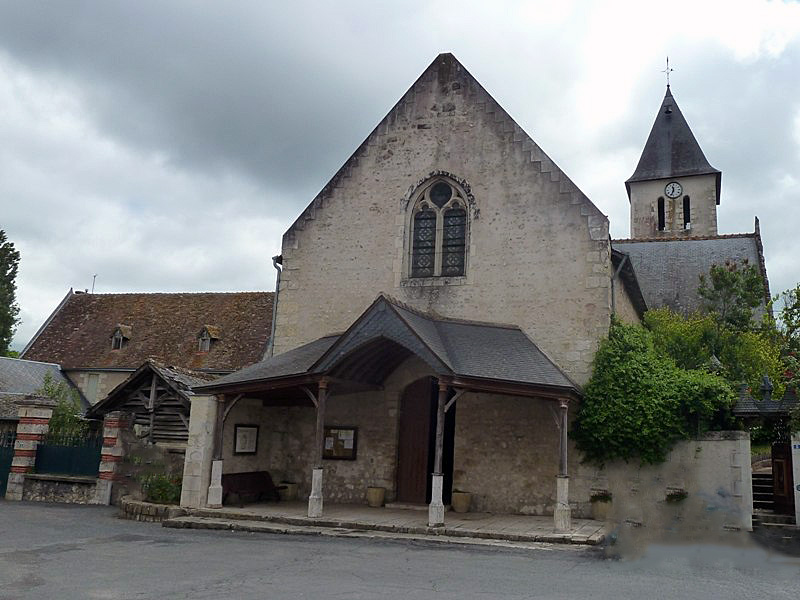
- Church in Vallières-les-Grandes

- Coat of arms
- Location of Vallières-les-Grandes
- Location within France Location within Centre-Val de Loire
- Coordinates: 47°25′25″N 1°08′52″E
- Country: France
- Region: Centre-Val de Loire
- Department: Loir-et-Cher
- Arrondissement: Romorantin-Lanthenay
- Canton: Montrichard Val de Cher
- Intercommunality: Val-de-Cher-Controis

Government
  - Mayor (2020–2026): Eric Lacroix
- Area^{1}: 40.75 km^{2} (15.73 sq mi)
- Elevation: 100 m (330 ft)
- Highest elevation: 134 m (440 ft)
- Lowest elevation: 77 m (253 ft)
- Population (2023): 943
  - Density: 23.1/km^{2} (59.9/sq mi)
- Time zone: UTC+01:00 (CET)
  - Summer (DST): UTC+02:00 (CEST)
- INSEE/Postal code: 41267 /41400
- ^{1} French Land Register data, which excludes lakes, ponds, glaciers > 1 km^{2} (0.386 sq mi or 247 acres) and river estuaries.

Vallières-les-Grandes (French pronunciation: [valjɛʁ le ɡʁɑ̃d]) is a commune of the Loir-et-Cher department in central France.

== Population ==
Historical population
Year	Pop.	±% p.a.
1968	688	—
1975	621	−1.45%
1982	553	−1.64%
1990	493	−1.43%
1999	610	+2.39%
2007	794	+3.35%
2012	855	+1.49%
2017	937	+1.85%
2023	943	+0.11%
Source: INSEE

== See also ==
- Communes of the Loir-et-Cher department
