= Fresnes, Loir-et-Cher =

Fresnes
- Commune
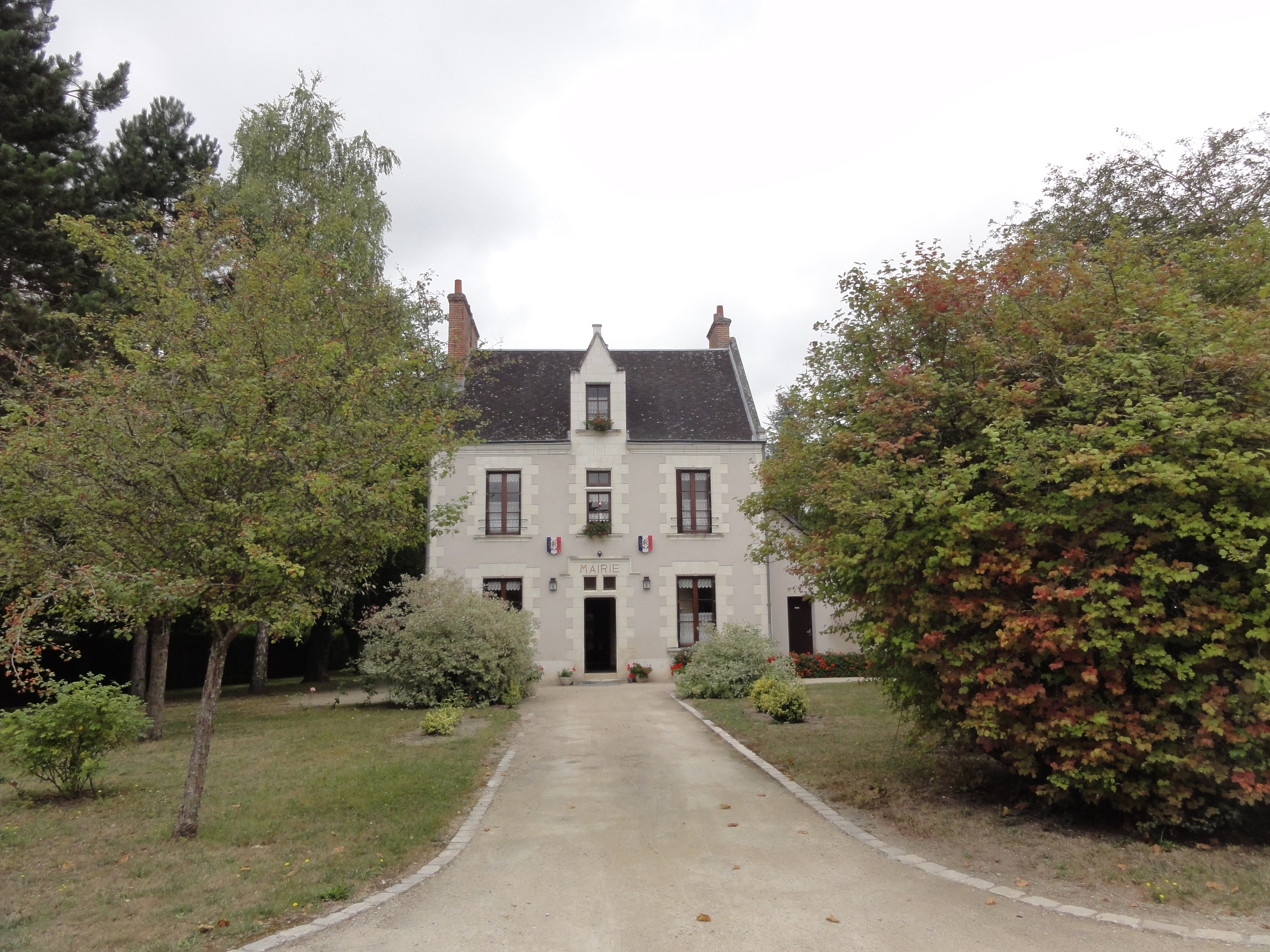
- Town hall
- Location of Fresnes
- Location within France Location within Centre-Val de Loire
- Coordinates: 47°26′07″N 1°24′46″E
- Country: France
- Region: Centre-Val de Loire
- Department: Loir-et-Cher
- Arrondissement: Romorantin-Lanthenay
- Canton: Montrichard Val de Cher
- Intercommunality: Val-de-Cher-Controis

Government
  - Mayor (2020–2026): Philippe Torset
- Area^{1}: 16.02 km^{2} (6.19 sq mi)
- Elevation: 91 m (299 ft)
- Highest elevation: 112 m (367 ft)
- Lowest elevation: 86 m (282 ft)
- Population (2023): 1,200
  - Density: 75/km^{2} (190/sq mi)
- Time zone: UTC+01:00 (CET)
  - Summer (DST): UTC+02:00 (CEST)
- INSEE/Postal code: 41094 /41700
- ^{1} French Land Register data, which excludes lakes, ponds, glaciers > 1 km^{2} (0.386 sq mi or 247 acres) and river estuaries.

Fresnes (French pronunciation: [fʁɛn]) is a commune in the Loir-et-Cher department, Centre-Val de Loire, France.

== Population ==
Historical population
| Year | Pop. | ±% p.a. |
|---|---|---|
| 1968 | 505 | — |
| 1975 | 562 | +1.54% |
| 1982 | 668 | +2.50% |
| 1990 | 683 | +0.28% |
| 1999 | 808 | +1.88% |
| 2007 | 981 | +2.45% |
| 2012 | 1,130 | +2.87% |
| 2017 | 1,145 | +0.26% |
| 2023 | 1,200 | +0.79% |
Source: INSEE

== See also ==
- Communes of the Loir-et-Cher department
