= Château de Montpoupon =

Castle in Céré-la-Ronde in the Indre-et-Loire département of France

Coordinates: 47°15′11″N 1°8′28″E

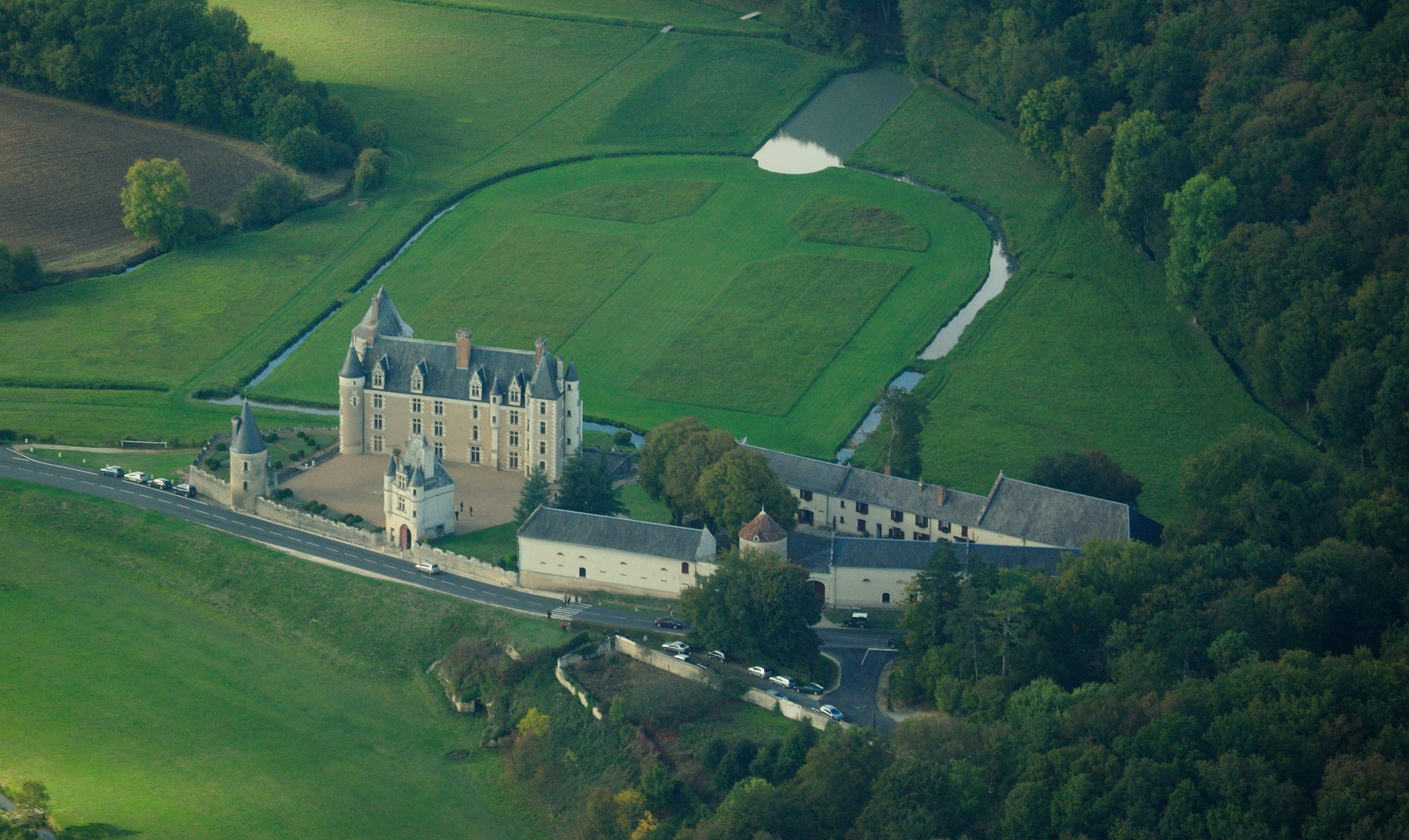
Château de Montpoupon, aerial view

The Château de Montpoupon (pronounced [ʃɑto də mɔ̃pupɔ̃]) is a castle in the commune of Céré-la-Ronde in the Indre-et-Loire département of France. It is located to the east of Tours, 10 km south of Montrichard in a forested valley.

== History ==
Originally a mediaeval fortress, the castle was altered by the lords of Prie and Buzançais. The postern was constructed in the 16th century.

Since the middle of 19th century, the castle has belonged to the Motte Saint Pierre family. It houses one of the four French museums dedicated to hunting with dogs.

It has been listed since 1930 as a monument historique by the French Ministry of Culture.

== See also ==
- List of castles in France
