= Chissay-en-Touraine =

- Commune
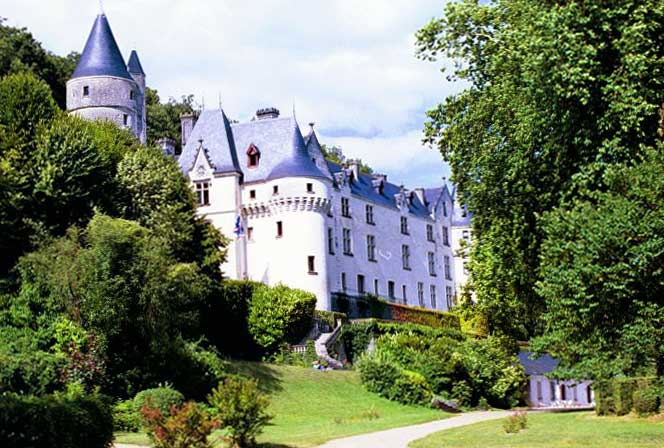
- Château de La Ménaudière
- Location of Chissay-en-Touraine
- Location within France Location within Centre-Val de Loire
- Coordinates: 47°20′17″N 1°08′02″E
- Country: France
- Region: Centre-Val de Loire
- Department: Loir-et-Cher
- Arrondissement: Romorantin-Lanthenay
- Canton: Montrichard Val de Cher
- Intercommunality: Val-de-Cher-Controis

Government
  - Mayor (2020–2026): Philippe Plassais
- Area^{1}: 18.17 km^{2} (7.02 sq mi)
- Elevation: 63 m (207 ft)
- Highest elevation: 138 m (453 ft)
- Lowest elevation: 55 m (180 ft)
- Population (2023): 1,100
  - Density: 61/km^{2} (160/sq mi)
- Time zone: UTC+01:00 (CET)
  - Summer (DST): UTC+02:00 (CEST)
- INSEE/Postal code: 41051 /41400
- ^{1} French Land Register data, which excludes lakes, ponds, glaciers > 1 km^{2} (0.386 sq mi or 247 acres) and river estuaries.

Chissay-en-Touraine (French pronunciation: [ʃisɛ ɑ̃ tuʁɛn], literally Chissay in Touraine) is a commune in the Loir-et-Cher department of central France.

== Population ==
Historical population
Year	Pop.	±% p.a.
1968	856	—
1975	850	−0.10%
1982	846	−0.07%
1990	871	+0.36%
1999	916	+0.56%
2007	1,085	+2.14%
2012	1,157	+1.29%
2017	1,127	−0.52%
2023	1,100	−0.40%
Source: INSEE

== See also ==
- Communes of the Loir-et-Cher department
