= Konstantin Altunin =

Russian painter from Arkhangelsk, Russia

Konstantin Viktorovich Altunin (Russian: Константин Викторович Алтунин, born December 21, 1967) is a Russian painter from Arkhangelsk, Russia. He left Russia following a controversy after a painting of Vladimir Putin and Dmitry Medvedev in women's underwear had been seized by St. Petersburg authorities. He has been exhibiting paintings since 2000.

== Other controversial paintings by Altunin ==
On another painting Altunin depicted the politician Vitaly Milonov against a rainbow background. The rainbow is the symbol of the LGBT community. He also produced a painting with Putin wearing women's underwear and painted a sculpted head of Lenin with dripping rainbow colors.
