= Monthou-sur-Cher =

- Commune
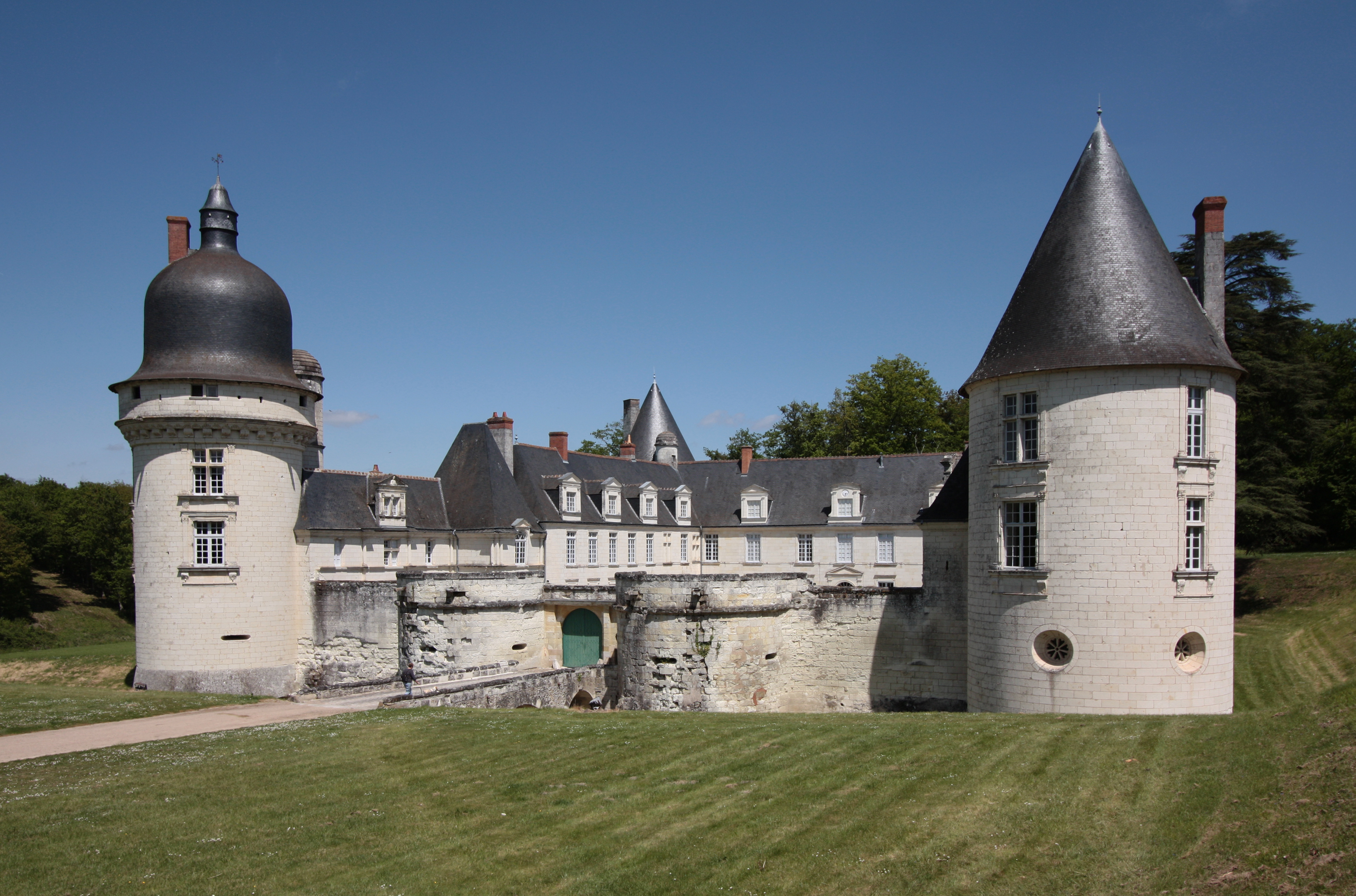
- Château du Gué-Péan
- Location of Monthou-sur-Cher
- Location within France Location within Centre-Val de Loire
- Coordinates: 47°20′51″N 1°17′46″E
- Country: France
- Region: Centre-Val de Loire
- Department: Loir-et-Cher
- Arrondissement: Romorantin-Lanthenay
- Canton: Montrichard Val de Cher
- Intercommunality: CC Val-de-Cher-Controis

Government
  - Mayor (2020–2026): Jean-François Marinier
- Area^{1}: 20.16 km^{2} (7.78 sq mi)
- Elevation: 67 m (220 ft)
- Highest elevation: 135 m (443 ft)
- Lowest elevation: 61 m (200 ft)
- Population (2023): 986
  - Density: 48.9/km^{2} (127/sq mi)
- Demonym: Montholiens
- Time zone: UTC+01:00 (CET)
  - Summer (DST): UTC+02:00 (CEST)
- INSEE/Postal code: 41146 /41400
- ^{1} French Land Register data, which excludes lakes, ponds, glaciers > 1 km^{2} (0.386 sq mi or 247 acres) and river estuaries.

Monthou-sur-Cher (French pronunciation: [mɔ̃tu syʁ ʃɛʁ]; lit. 'Monthou-on-Cher') is a rural commune in the Loir-et-Cher department, central France.

== Population ==
Historical population
Year	Pop.	±% p.a.
1968	836	—
1975	805	−0.54%
1982	850	+0.78%
1990	867	+0.25%
1999	902	+0.44%
2007	941	+0.53%
2012	969	+0.59%
2017	964	−0.10%
2023	986	+0.38%
Source: INSEE

== See also ==
- Communes of the Loir-et-Cher department
- Tasciaca
