= Céré-la-Ronde =

- Commune
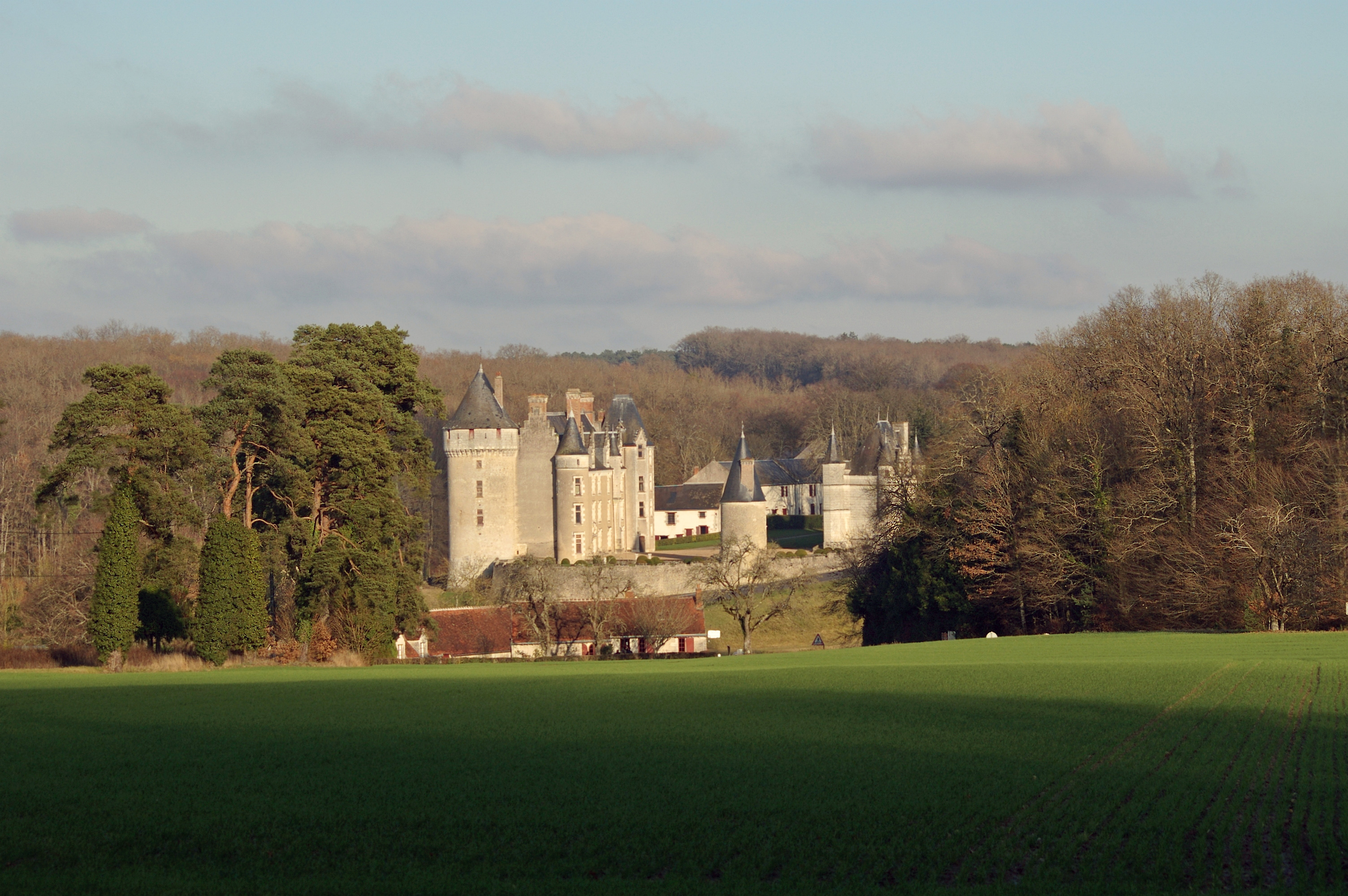
- Chateau of Monpoupon

- Coat of arms
- Location of Céré-la-Ronde
- Location within France Location within Centre-Val de Loire
- Coordinates: 47°15′41″N 1°11′27″E
- Country: France
- Region: Centre-Val de Loire
- Department: Indre-et-Loire
- Arrondissement: Loches
- Canton: Bléré

Government
  - Mayor (2023–2026): Christian Ricou
- Area^{1}: 49.2 km^{2} (19.0 sq mi)
- Highest elevation: 186 m (610 ft)
- Lowest elevation: 84 m (276 ft)
- Population (2023): 418
  - Density: 8.50/km^{2} (22.0/sq mi)
- Time zone: UTC+01:00 (CET)
  - Summer (DST): UTC+02:00 (CEST)
- INSEE/Postal code: 37046 /37460
- ^{1} French Land Register data, which excludes lakes, ponds, glaciers > 1 km^{2} (0.386 sq mi or 247 acres) and river estuaries.

Céré-la-Ronde (French pronunciation: [seʁe la ʁɔ̃d]) is a commune in the Indre-et-Loire department, central France.

== Population ==
Historical population
Year	Pop.	±% p.a.
1968	636	—
1975	567	−1.63%
1982	477	−2.44%
1990	435	−1.15%
1999	437	+0.05%
2007	420	−0.49%
2012	454	+1.57%
2017	459	+0.22%
2023	418	−1.55%
Source: INSEE

== See also ==
- Communes of the Indre-et-Loire department
- Château de Montpoupon
