= Knapping =

Technique of manufacturing stone tools

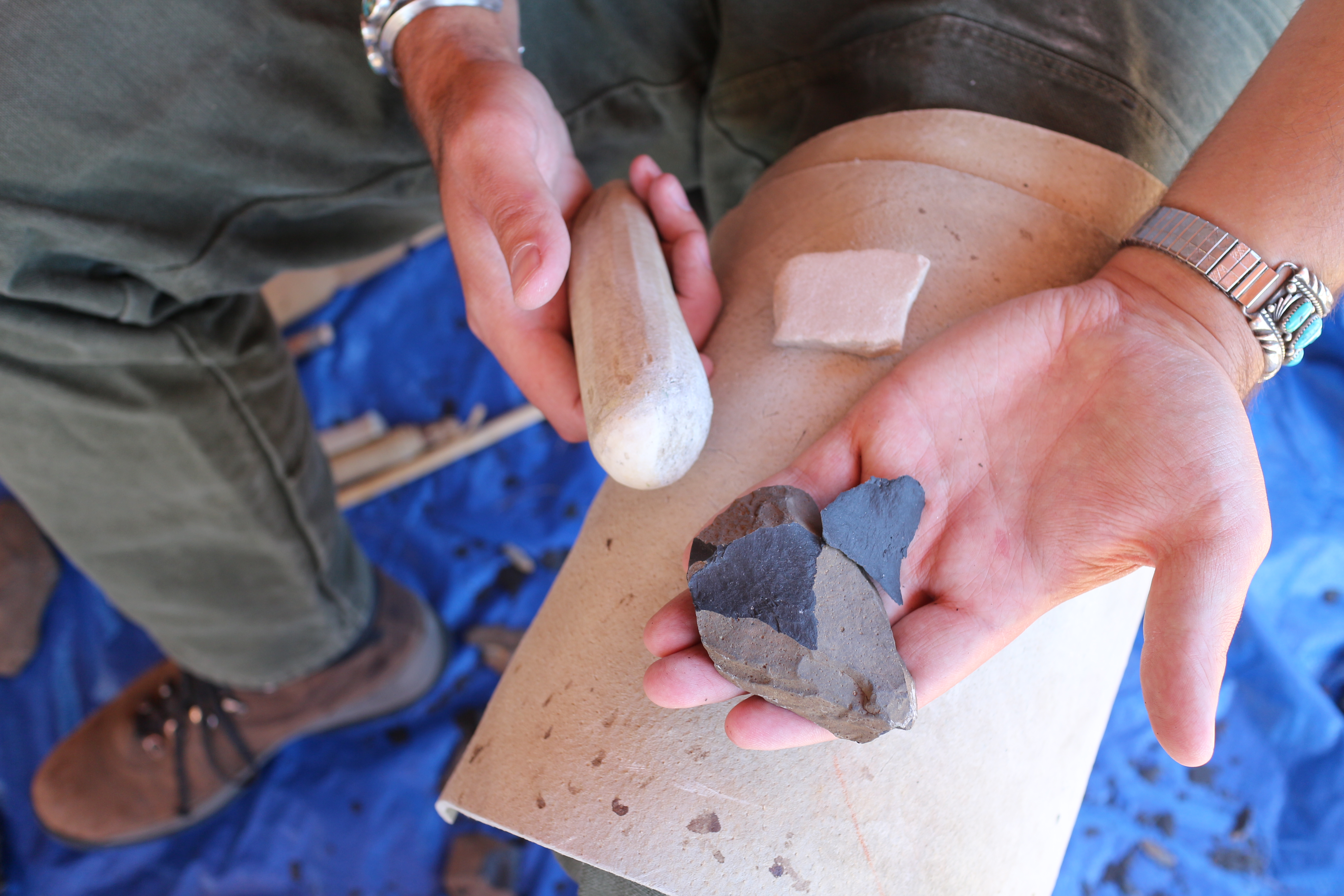
Flintknapping a stone tool

Knapping (/ˈnæpɪŋ/ NAP-ing) is the shaping of flint, chert, obsidian, or other conchoidal fracturing stone through the process of lithic reduction to manufacture stone tools, strikers for flintlock firearms, or to produce flat-faced stones for building or facing walls, and flushwork decoration. The term “knap”(1500s) was originally onomatopoeic and meant “strike with a sharp sound” (with the k- pronounced) and later shifted to mean “to shape or work by sharp strikes”. Modern usage is more specific, referring almost exclusively to the free hand percussion process pictured. It is distinguished from the more general verb "chip" (to break up into small pieces, or unintentionally break off a piece of something) and is different from "carve" (removing only part of a face), and "cleave" (breaking along a natural plane).

== Method ==
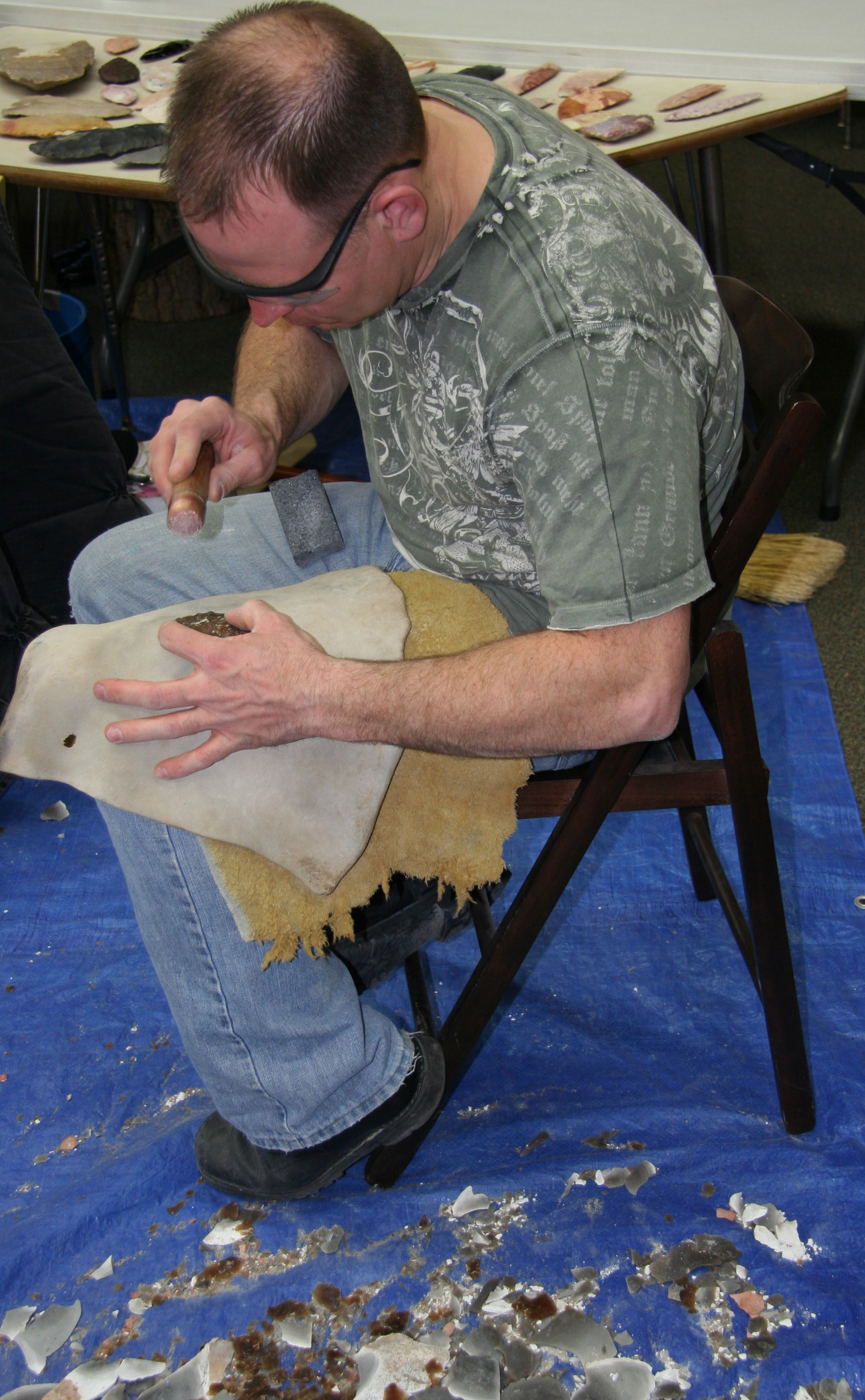
A leather leg guard protects the knapper from being injured by the edges of the flint.

Flintknapping or knapping is done in a variety of ways depending on the purpose of the final product. For stone tools and flintlock strikers, chert is worked using a fabricator such as a hammerstone to remove lithic flakes from a nucleus or core of tool stone. Stone tools can then be further refined using wood, bone, and antler tools to perform pressure flaking.

For building work a hammer or pick is used to split chert nodules supported on the lap. Often the chert nodule will be split in half to create two cherts with a flat circular face for use in walls constructed of lime. More sophisticated knapping is employed to produce near-perfect cubes which are used as bricks.

=== Tools ===
There are many different methods of shaping stone into useful tools. One prominent knapping technique in early production is the Levallois technique, which utilizes a distinct striking platform and exploitation surface. Beyond the Levallois technique, there were also polyhedral strategies that differ from Levallois methods in that all faces were used as flaking surfaces and striking platforms. This method involves no division of function amongst parts of the core.

Early knappers could have used simple hammers made of wood or antler to shape stone tools. The factors that contribute to the knapping results are varied, but the EPA (exterior platform angle) indeed influences many attributes, such as length, thickness and termination of flakes.

Hard hammer techniques are used to remove large flakes of stone. Early knappers and hobbyists replicating their methods often use cobbles of very hard stone, such as quartzite. This technique can be used by flintknappers to remove broad flakes that can be made into smaller tools. This method of manufacture is believed to have been used to make some of the earliest stone tools ever found, some of which date from over 2 million years ago.

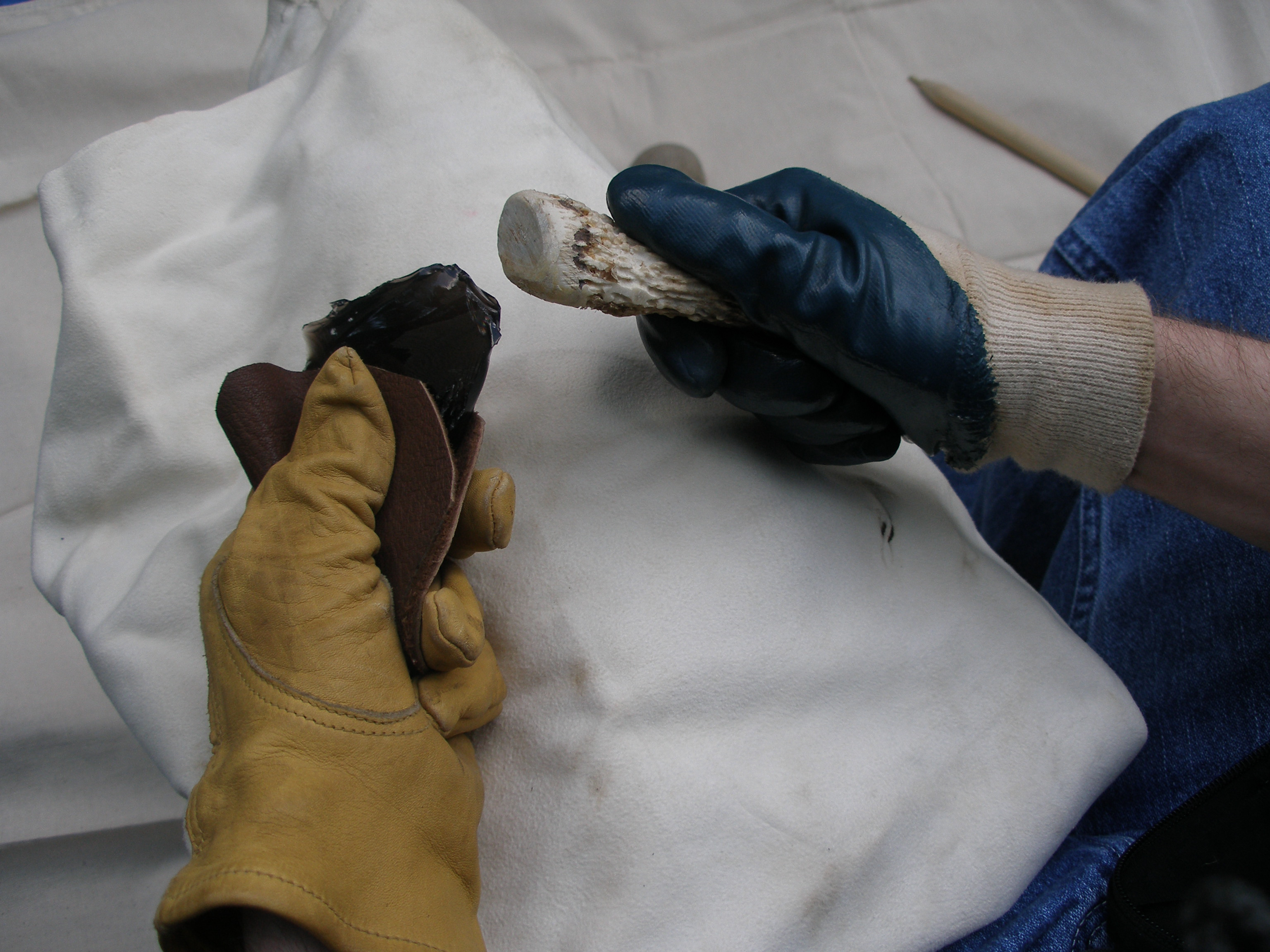
Soft hammer knapping

Soft hammer techniques are more precise than hard hammer methods of shaping stone. Soft hammer techniques allow a knapper to shape a stone into many different kinds of cutting, scraping, and projectile tools. These "soft hammer" techniques also produce longer, thinner flakes, potentially allowing for material conservation or a lighter lithic tool kit to be carried by mobile societies.

Pressure flaking involves removing narrow flakes along the edge of a stone tool. This technique is often used to do detailed thinning and shaping of a stone tool. Pressure flaking involves putting a large amount of force across a region on the edge of the tool and (when successful) causing a narrow flake to come off of the stone. Modern hobbyists often use pressure flaking tools with a copper or brass tip, but early knappers could have used antler tines or a pointed wooden punch; traditionalist knappers still use antler tines and copper-tipped tools. The major advantage of using soft metals rather than wood or bone is that the metal punches wear down less and are less likely to break under pressure.

== Uses ==
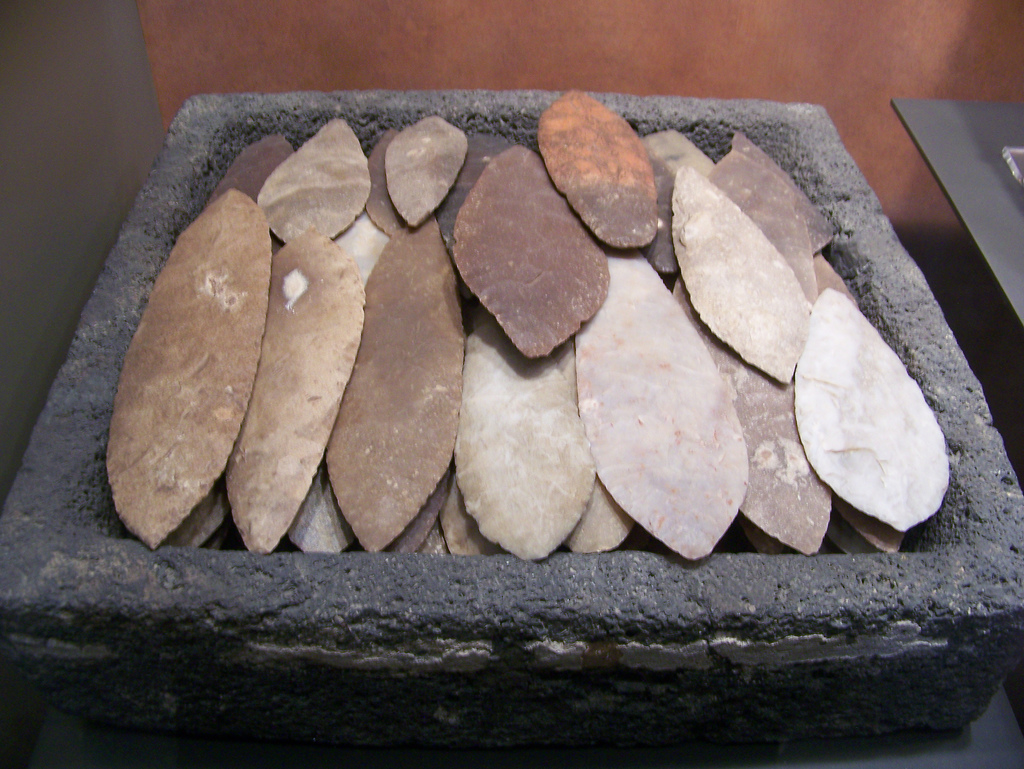
Aztec stone knives

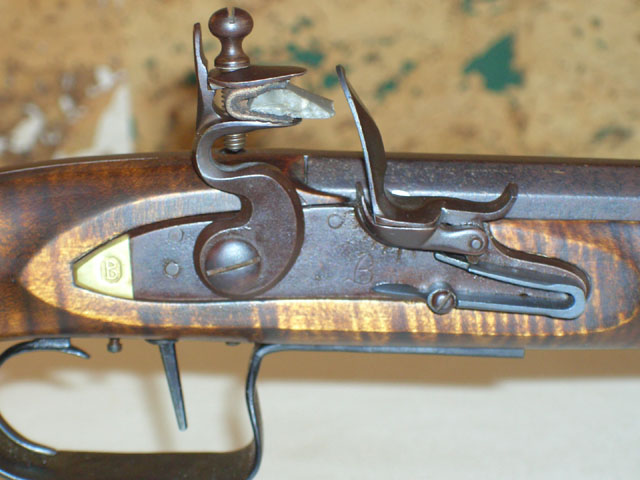
A gun-flint mounted in the jaws of a flintlock musket

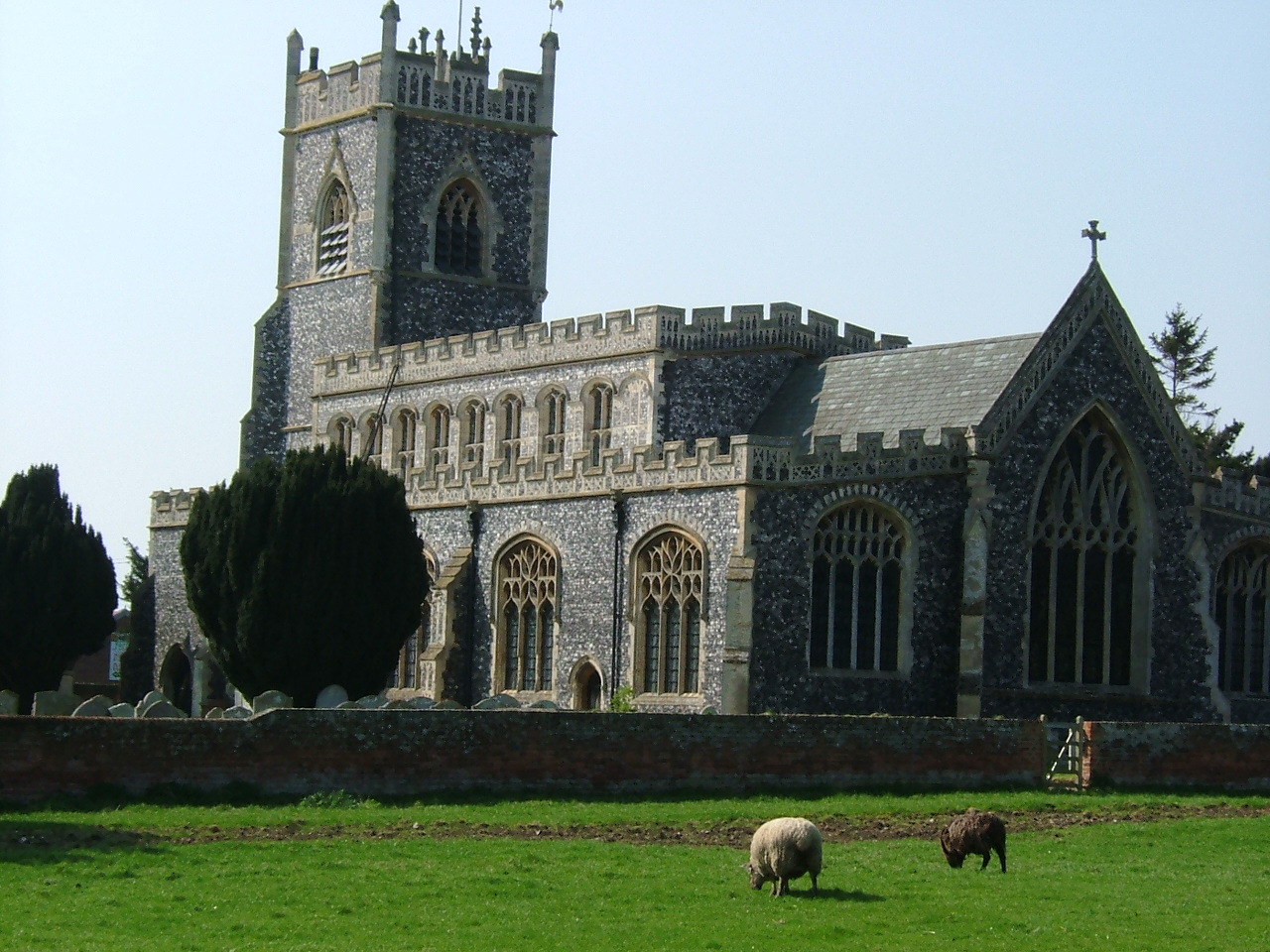
Knapped flint walls and flushwork at the church of Stratford St. Mary

In cultures that have not adopted metalworking technologies, the production of stone tools by knappers is common, but in modern cultures the making of such tools is the domain of experimental archaeologists and hobbyists. Archaeologists usually undertake the task so that they can better understand how prehistoric stone tools were made.

Knapping was developed in Africa to aid hunter-gatherers in collecting food. Hunter-gatherers would take prepared tools like Levallois points and triangular flakes with them away from their site to hunt.

In Ancient Africa, specifically Ancient Egypt, knapping methods were large-scale productions of flint and chert tools made for both soft and hard stone working. Flint knappers made sharp, disposable tools used to shape limestone, granite, and other materials. These flint tools evolved in design depending on the material they worked with, serving multiple purposes like carving hieroglyphs, shaping sculptures, and smoothing surfaces.

During the time when knapping was used to make tools, flaked tools were no less effective compared to other tool making methods. With modern technology, it shows that flake tools stood against environmental shifts and were fit for a purpose.

Knapping gun flints, used by flintlock firearms was formerly a major industry in flint-bearing locations, such as Brandon in Suffolk, England, and the small towns of Meusnes and Couffy in France. Meusnes has a small museum dedicated to the industry.

In 1804, during the Napoleonic Wars, Brandon was supplying over 400,000 flints a month for use by the British Army and Navy. Brandon knappers made gun flints for export to Africa as late as the 1960s.

Knapping for building purposes is still a skill that is practiced in the flint-bearing regions of southern England, such as Sussex, Suffolk, and Norfolk, and in northern France, especially Brittany and Normandy, where there is a resurgence of the craft due to government funding.

== Health hazards ==
The sustained inhalation of flint dust produced by knapping can cause silicosis. This has been called "the world's first industrial disease". However, it is unclear how severe the issue may actually have been in prehistoric working conditions, as silicosis is aggravated by a lack of ventilation and the use of metal tools which produce more dust. Ancient knappers, working in the open air and with stone and bone tools, would have had less prolonged exposure to dust than in more modern workshops.

When gun flint knapping was a large-scale industry in Brandon, Suffolk, silicosis was widely known as knappers' rot. It has been claimed silicosis was responsible for the early death of three-quarters of Brandon gun flint makers. In one workshop, seven of the eight workers died of the condition before the age of fifty. The average age of death for knappers was 44 years, compared to 66 for other employed men in the same area.

Modern knappers are advised to work in the open air to reduce the dust hazard, and to wear eye and hand protection. Some modern knappers wear a respirator to guard against dust. A 2020 survey of 173 knappers found that 86% used eye protection, 57% wore gloves, and only 5% used a respirator, mask, or fan to control dust (although 68% preferred to knap outdoors). About half of respondents reported being injured at least "often" when knapping, and 23% admitted having to seek professional medical attention at least once. The most common injuries were cuts and bruises, typically on the fingers and hands, while flakes in the eye were also frequent.

== Contemporary study ==
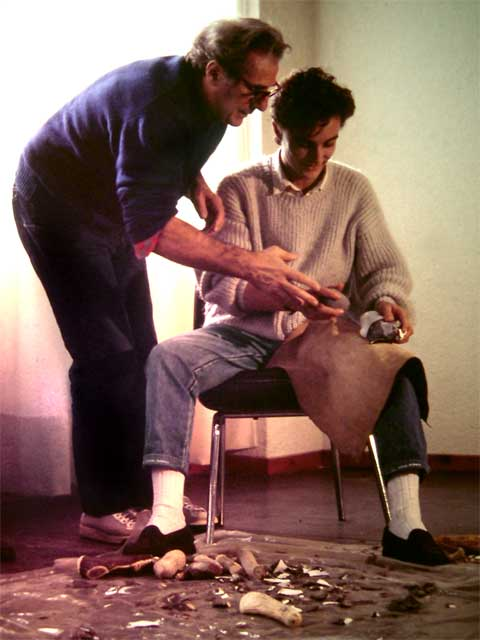
French prehistorian Jacques Tixier offers modern training in stone knapping.

Modern American interest in knapping can be traced back to the study of a California Native American called Ishi who lived in the early twentieth century. Ishi taught scholars and academics traditional methods of making stone tools and how to use them for survival in the wild. Early European explorers to the New world were also exposed to flint knapping techniques. Additionally, several pioneering nineteenth-century European experimental knappers are also known and in the late 1960s and early 1970s experimental archaeologist Don Crabtree published texts such as Experiments in Flintworking. François Bordes was an early writer on Old World knapping; he experimented with ways to replicate stone tools found across Western Europe. These authors helped to ignite a small craze in knapping among archaeologists and prehistorians.

English archaeologist Phil Harding is another contemporary expert, whose exposure on the television series Time Team has led to him being a familiar figure in the UK and beyond. Many groups, with members from all walks of life, can now be found across the United States and Europe. These organizations continue to demonstrate and teach various ways of shaping stone tools.

== See also ==
- Ancient Egyptian flint jewelry
- Debitage – Archeological term; material produced during the process of lithic reduction
- Eccentric flint – Mayan archaeological artifact
- Lithic technology – Ancient production techniques
- Nap (disambiguation)
- Olduwan – Archaeological culture
- Solutrean – Archaeological industry of the European Upper Paleolithic
- Tranchet axe – Type of edged stone tool
