= Ancient Egyptian flint jewelry =

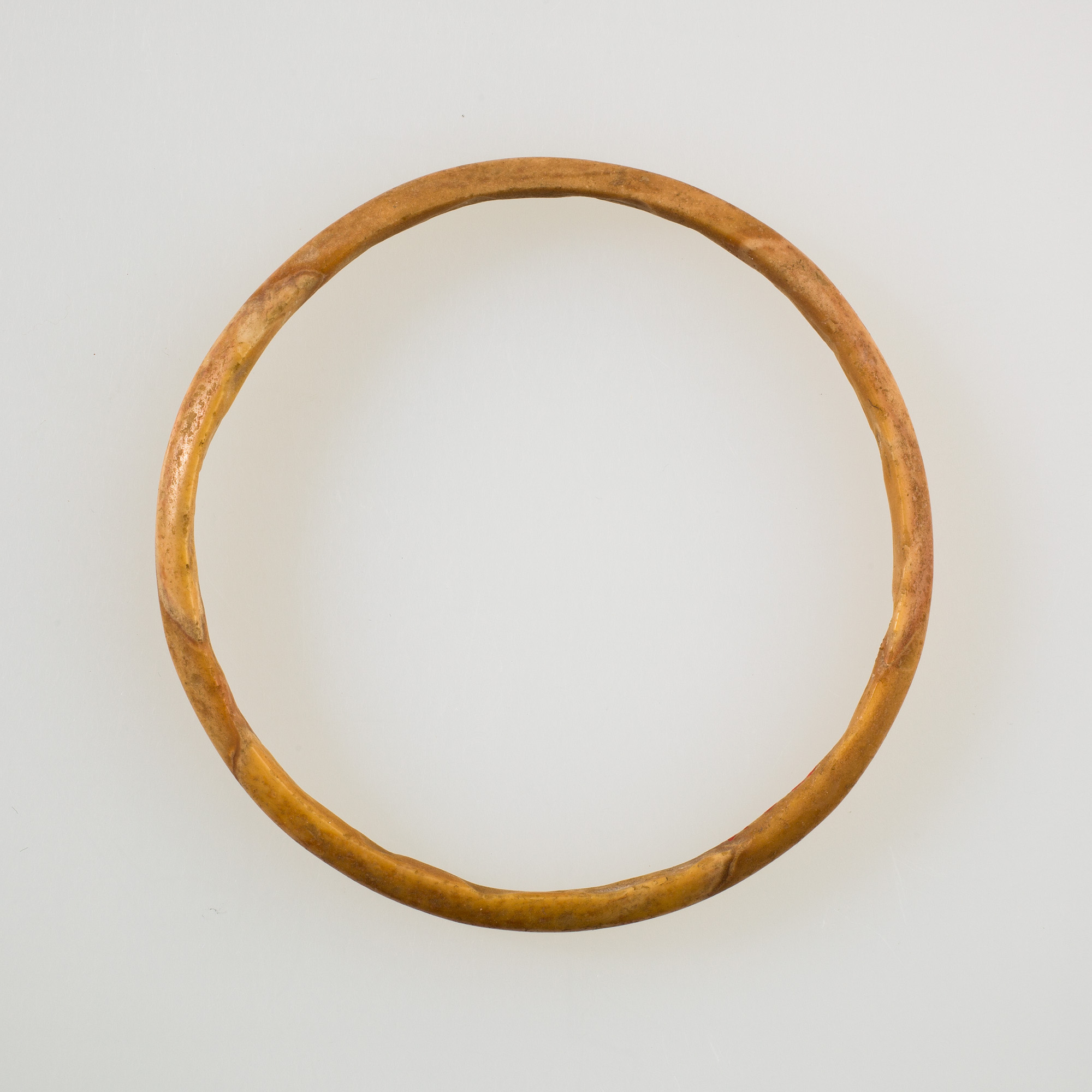
Ancient Egyptian flint Bracelet (MET 23.2.14 EGDP011486)

Flint jewelry was known in the prehistoric, protodynastic, and early dynastic periods of ancient Egypt. Ancient Egyptians skillfully made bracelets and armlets out of flint.

The flint came from locations that include Giza and Upper Egypt. The exact technique used to form rings is not known, but there are several theories based on the examples that have been found in graves and workshops.

Flint bracelets can be found in collections such as those in the Cairo Museum of Egyptian Antiquities, the Fitzwilliam Museum, the Pitt Rivers Museum, the Metropolitan Museum of Art, and the Brooklyn Museum.

== See also ==
- Clothing in ancient Egypt
- Eccentric flint (archaeology)
- Knapping
- Lithic reduction
- Oldowan, the earliest stone tool industry in prehistory
