= Yves Beaujard =

French illustrator and engraver (1939–2024)

- Born: 27 November 1939; Saint-Aignan-sur-Cher, France
- Died: 4 June 2024 (aged 84); Mareuil-sur-Cher, France
- Education: École Estienne
- Occupation: Artist

Yves Beaujard (27 November 1939 – 4 June 2024) was a French illustrator, engraver, and stamp designer.

== Biography ==
Born in Saint-Ainan-sur-Cher on 27 November 1939, Beaujard graduated from the École Estienne in 1960 and created his first postage stamps for Vietnam in 1966. The following year, he began a career as an engraver in the United States with the Bureau of Engraving and Printing, producing portraits of U.S. presidents for bank notes of the Federal Reserve. He returned to France in 1977 and became an independent illustrator and engraver. He contributed to coloring numerous children's works, including the Alex Lechat series published in Le Journal de Mickey. He also did French illustrations for the series Three Investigators. His first stamp used by the French government was issued in 1999, which was a portrait of Frédéric Ozanam. In December 2004, he became vice-president of the nonprofit Art du timbre gravé. His project on Marianne was chosen by President Nicolas Sarkozy to become a definitive stamp, named the Marianne et l'Europe series, in use from 1 July 2008 until 2013. He was the father of Sophie Beaujard, who also became an illustrator, engraver, and stamp designer.

Beaujard died in Mareuil-sur-Cher on 4 June 2024, at the age of 84.
