= Rougeou =

- Commune
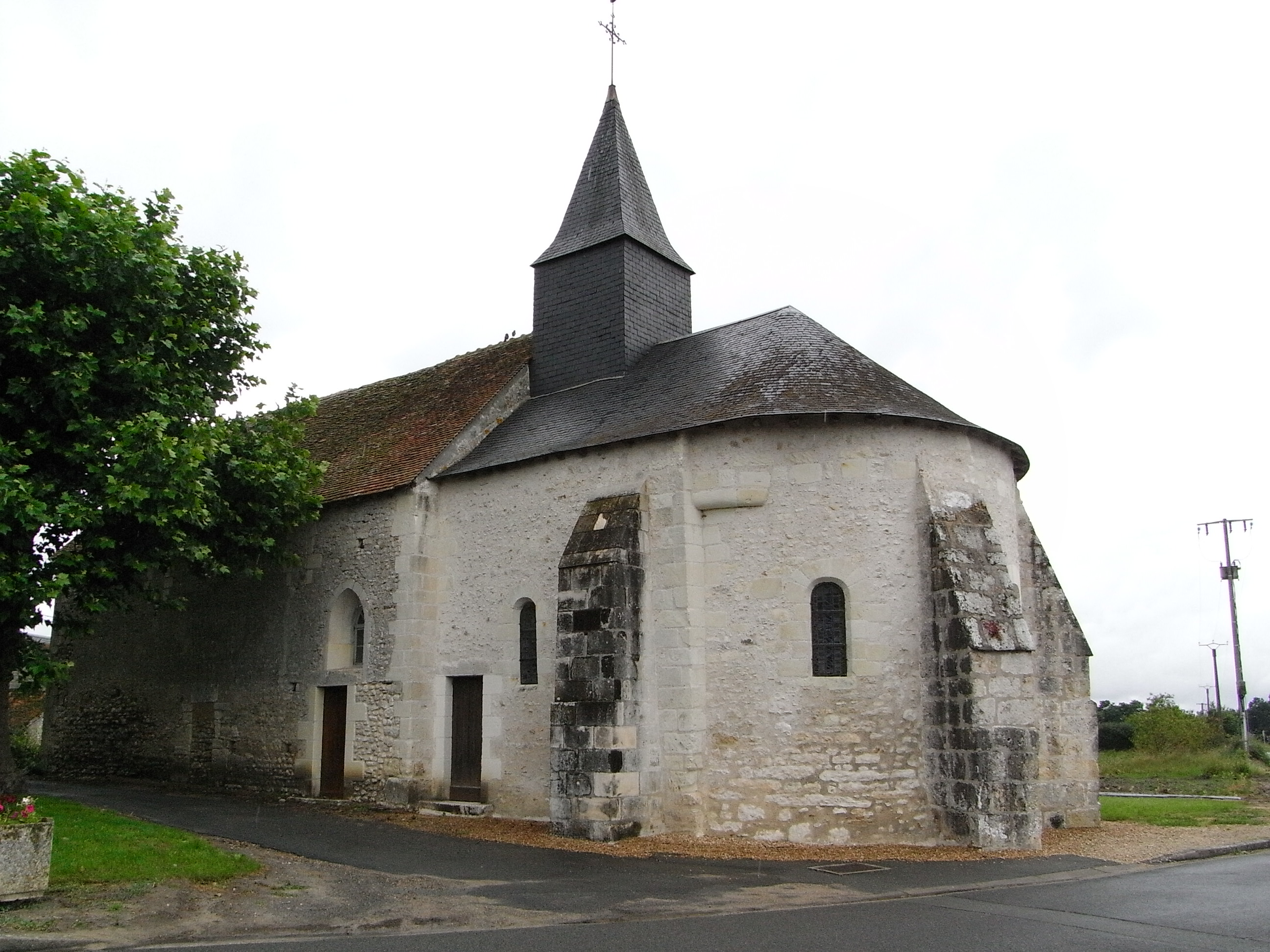
- The church of Saint-Jean-Baptiste

- Coat of arms
- Location of Rougeou
- Location within France Location within Centre-Val de Loire
- Coordinates: 47°21′45″N 1°32′12″E
- Country: France
- Region: Centre-Val de Loire
- Department: Loir-et-Cher
- Arrondissement: Romorantin-Lanthenay
- Canton: Saint-Aignan

Government
  - Mayor (2020–2026): Bénédite Joulan
- Area^{1}: 7.89 km^{2} (3.05 sq mi)
- Elevation: 90 m (300 ft)
- Highest elevation: 111 m (364 ft)
- Lowest elevation: 92 m (302 ft)
- Population (2023): 150
  - Density: 19/km^{2} (49/sq mi)
- Time zone: UTC+01:00 (CET)
  - Summer (DST): UTC+02:00 (CEST)
- INSEE/Postal code: 41195 /41230
- ^{1} French Land Register data, which excludes lakes, ponds, glaciers > 1 km^{2} (0.386 sq mi or 247 acres) and river estuaries.

Rougeou (French pronunciation: [ʁuʒu]) is a commune in the Loir-et-Cher department of central France.

== Population ==
Historical population
Year	Pop.	±% p.a.
1968	116	—
1975	108	−1.02%
1982	107	−0.13%
1990	109	+0.23%
1999	102	−0.73%
2007	122	+2.26%
2012	123	+0.16%
2017	159	+5.27%
2023	150	−0.97%
Source: INSEE

== See also ==
- Communes of the Loir-et-Cher department
