= Seigy =

- Commune
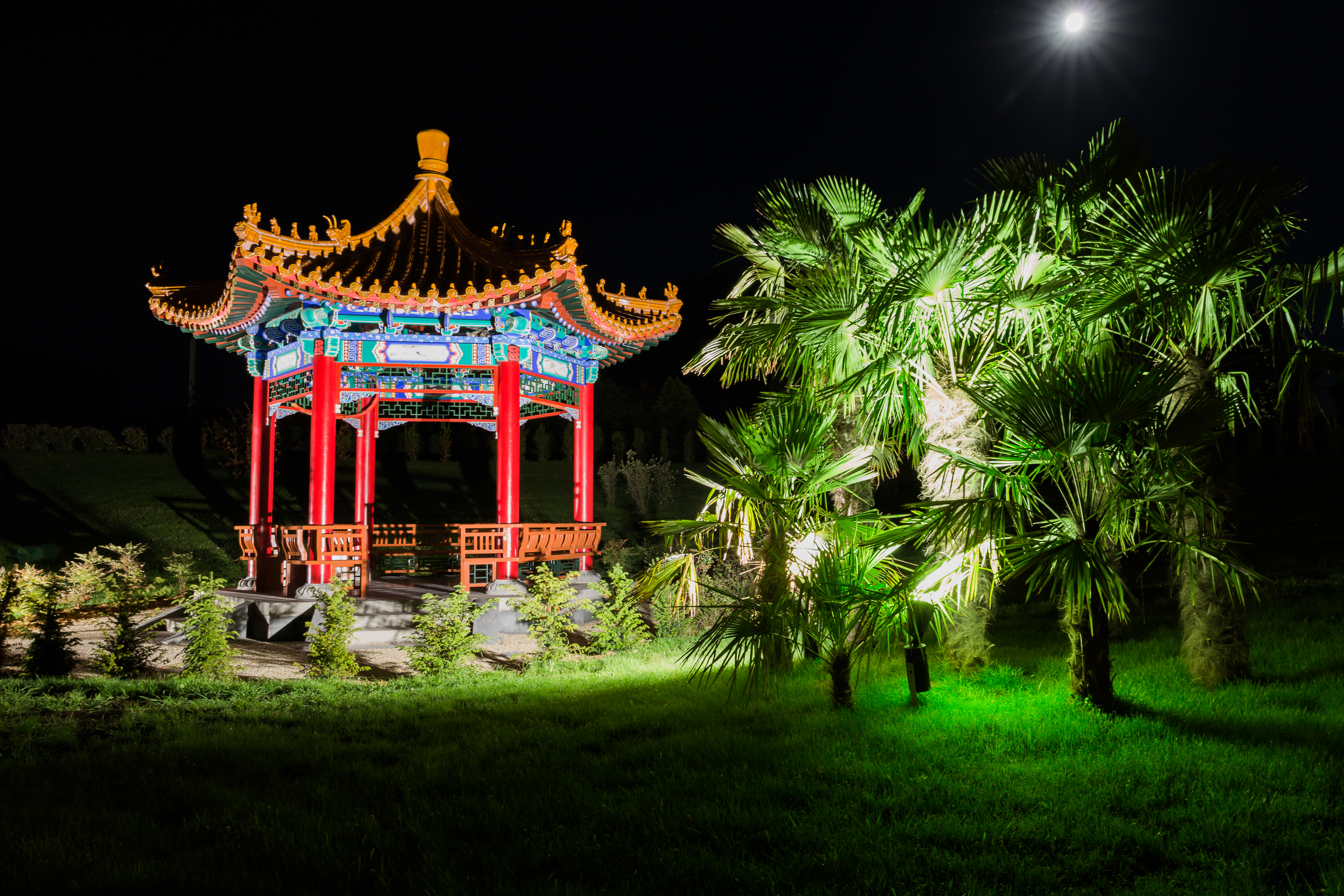
- Pagoda in the Les Pagodes de Beauval hotel
- Location of Seigy
- Location within France Location within Centre-Val de Loire
- Coordinates: 47°15′19″N 1°23′56″E
- Country: France
- Region: Centre-Val de Loire
- Department: Loir-et-Cher
- Arrondissement: Romorantin-Lanthenay
- Canton: Saint-Aignan
- Intercommunality: Val-de-Cher-Controis

Government
  - Mayor (2020–2026): Françoise Plat
- Area^{1}: 8.18 km^{2} (3.16 sq mi)
- Elevation: 80 m (260 ft)
- Highest elevation: 137 m (449 ft)
- Lowest elevation: 67 m (220 ft)
- Population (2023): 971
  - Density: 119/km^{2} (307/sq mi)
- Time zone: UTC+01:00 (CET)
  - Summer (DST): UTC+02:00 (CEST)
- INSEE/Postal code: 41239 /41110
- ^{1} French Land Register data, which excludes lakes, ponds, glaciers > 1 km^{2} (0.386 sq mi or 247 acres) and river estuaries.

Seigy (French pronunciation: [sɛʒi]) is a commune in the Loir-et-Cher department of central France.

== Population ==
Historical population
Year	Pop.	±% p.a.
1968	755	—
1975	929	+3.01%
1982	1,055	+1.83%
1990	1,036	−0.23%
1999	1,090	+0.57%
2007	1,107	+0.19%
2012	1,110	+0.05%
2017	1,055	−1.01%
2023	971	−1.37%
Source: INSEE

== See also ==
- Communes of the Loir-et-Cher department
