= Canton of Saint-Aignan =

Coordinates: 47.27°N 1.37°E

The canton of Saint-Aignan is an administrative division of the Loir-et-Cher department, central France. Its borders were modified at the French canton reorganisation which came into effect in March 2015. Its seat is in Saint-Aignan.

It consists of the following communes:

1. Angé
2. Châteauvieux
3. Châtillon-sur-Cher
4. Chémery
5. Couffy
6. Mareuil-sur-Cher
7. Méhers
8. Meusnes
9. Noyers-sur-Cher
10. Pouillé
11. Rougeou
12. Saint-Aignan
13. Saint-Romain-sur-Cher
14. Seigy
15. Soings-en-Sologne
16. Thésée
