= Marianne et l'Europe series =

French postage stamp series

The Marianne et l'Europe series or Marianne of Beaujard series was a definitive postage stamp series, issued on 1 July 2008 in Metropolitan France and the four overseas departments. The design created and engraved by Yves Beaujard marked the beginning of the Presidency of the Council of the European Union by France.

The Marianne et l'Europe series replaced the Marianne des Français series issued on 10 January 2005.

It was the first France's definitive stamp series to have all its denominations issued as self-adhesive in September 2008.

== Description ==
Marianne, the allegory of the French Republic, wearing a Phrygian cap, is presented in profile, looking to the left. Stars surrounded her head, evoking the flag of Europe. One of these stars is in the usual place of the tricolor cockade.

== Genesis ==
In October 2007, the President of the Republic Nicolas Sarkozy asked La Poste to organize a competition at the end of whom he would choose the new definitive stamp design of France. The competition topic was "The Marianne and Europe" (La Marianne et l'Europe). Fifty-eight artists who recently designed stamps for the French postal service were invited to send their project between 26 October and 16 November 2007. Forty-one were received and brought to the President.

Nicolas Sarkozy chose the project of engraver Yves Beaujard. La Poste's president, Jean-Paul Bailly officially presented the stamp design in Paris, on 29 January 2008.

The artist told he created "an old-fashioned Marianne", "realised a very classical version of the Marianne" and to have "given movement with the haircut" and activity with different size stars put around her head. A professional engraver, he drew with the idea to convert his design into an engraving because the definitive stamps of France has been usually printed in intaglio the past decades. It was the first time since the Liberté de Gandon d'après Delacroix series that a definitive series was designed and engraved by the same artist.

== Career ==
After a first day sale at the Paris Salon du timbre stamp show in June 2008, the first thirteen values were nationwide issued in gummed version and self-adhesive for the three main rates, on 1 July 2008, the first day of the six month Presidency of the Council of the European Union by France. Two twelve self-adhesive stamp booklets (with six Marianne stamps and two times tree designed by Beaujard on the "values of Europe": Democracy, Environment and Peace.

During the same stamp show, a five euro silver Marianne et l'Europe stamp was issued, with postal validity.

In September 2008, alongside a new offer targeting firm and companies, La Poste issued all Marianne et l'Europe denominations in form of self-adhesive stamps, sold in indivisible sheet of one hundred stamps or coil of three hundred.
