= Méhers =

- Commune
- Location of Méhers
- Location within France Location within Centre-Val de Loire
- Coordinates: 47°19′43″N 1°27′28″E
- Country: France
- Region: Centre-Val de Loire
- Department: Loir-et-Cher
- Arrondissement: Romorantin-Lanthenay
- Canton: Saint-Aignan
- Intercommunality: Val-de-Cher-Controis

Government
  - Mayor (2020–2026): Gilles Lions
- Area^{1}: 18.27 km^{2} (7.05 sq mi)
- Elevation: 100 m (330 ft)
- Highest elevation: 109 m (358 ft)
- Lowest elevation: 78 m (256 ft)
- Population (2023): 303
  - Density: 16.6/km^{2} (43.0/sq mi)
- Time zone: UTC+01:00 (CET)
  - Summer (DST): UTC+02:00 (CEST)
- INSEE/Postal code: 41132 /41140
- ^{1} French Land Register data, which excludes lakes, ponds, glaciers > 1 km^{2} (0.386 sq mi or 247 acres) and river estuaries.

Méhers is a commune in the Loir-et-Cher department of central France.

== Population ==
Historical population
Year	Pop.	±% p.a.
1968	364	—
1975	339	−1.01%
1982	303	−1.59%
1990	263	−1.75%
1999	257	−0.26%
2007	306	+2.21%
2012	348	+2.61%
2017	338	−0.58%
2023	303	−1.81%
Source: INSEE

== See also ==
- Communes of the Loir-et-Cher department
