= Pouillé, Loir-et-Cher =

Pouillé
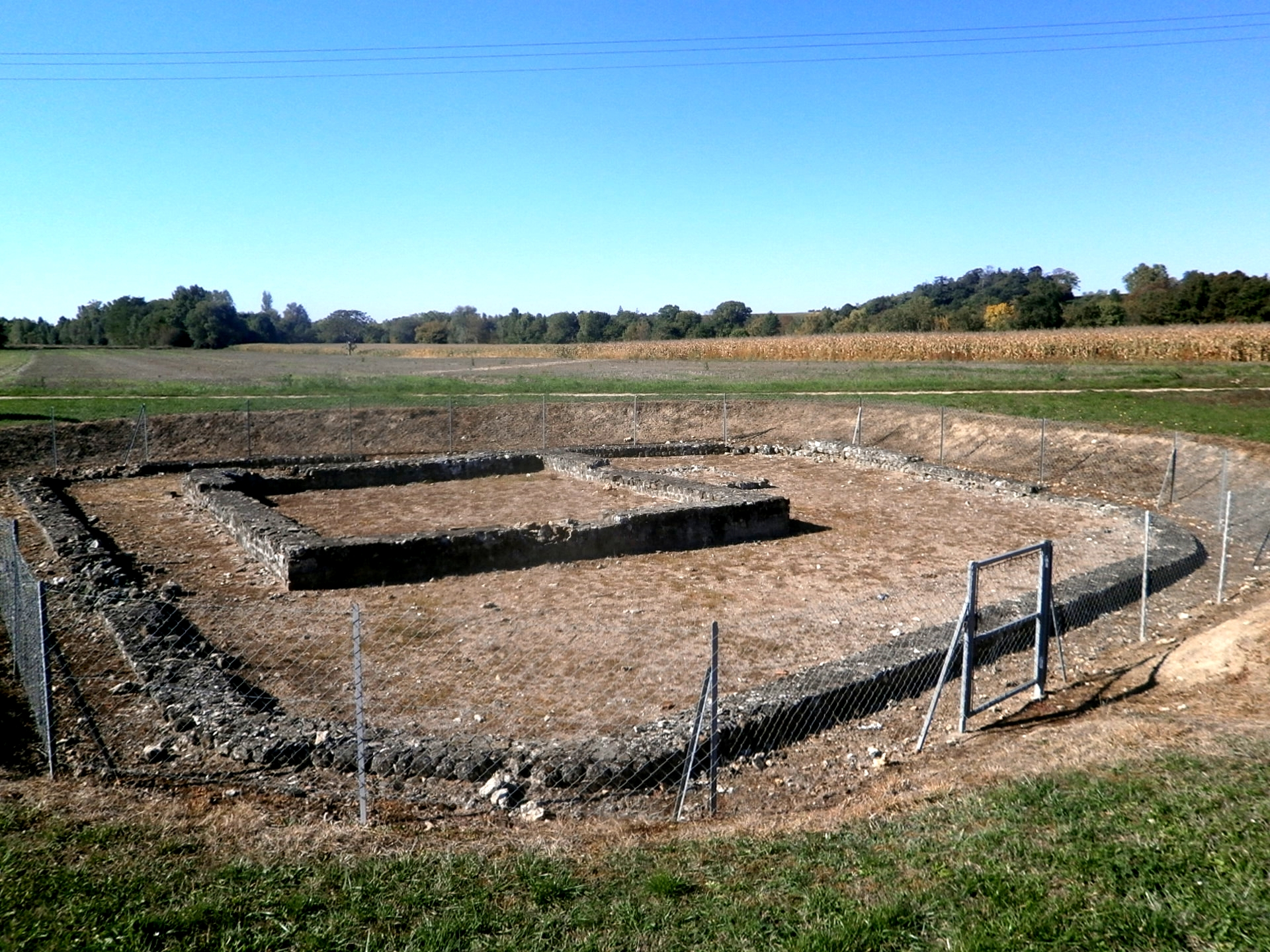
- Ancient temple
- Location of Pouillé
- Location within France Location within Centre-Val de Loire
- Coordinates: 47°19′08″N 1°17′20″E
- Country: France
- Region: Centre-Val de Loire
- Department: Loir-et-Cher
- Arrondissement: Romorantin-Lanthenay
- Canton: Saint-Aignan

Government
  - Mayor (2020–2026): Alain Goutx
- Area^{1}: 18.03 km^{2} (6.96 sq mi)
- Elevation: 69 m (226 ft)
- Highest elevation: 183 m (600 ft)
- Lowest elevation: 61 m (200 ft)
- Population (2023): 774
  - Density: 42.9/km^{2} (111/sq mi)
- Time zone: UTC+01:00 (CET)
  - Summer (DST): UTC+02:00 (CEST)
- INSEE/Postal code: 41181 /41110
- ^{1} French Land Register data, which excludes lakes, ponds, glaciers > 1 km^{2} (0.386 sq mi or 247 acres) and river estuaries.

Pouillé (French pronunciation: [puje]) is a commune in the Loir-et-Cher department of central France.

== Population ==
Historical population
Year	Pop.	±% p.a.
1968	602	—
1975	635	+0.77%
1982	657	+0.49%
1990	720	+1.15%
1999	754	+0.51%
2007	796	+0.68%
2012	811	+0.37%
2017	796	−0.37%
2023	774	−0.47%
Source: INSEE

== See also ==
- Communes of the Loir-et-Cher department
