= Thierry Lamouche =

French illustrator (born 1955)

Thierry Lamouche (born 12 July 1955 in Paris) is a French illustrator known for the design of the Marianne des Français series, the present French definitive stamp series.

Thierry Lamouche became suddenly famous in July 2004 when his stamp design for a new Marianne series is chosen by the public and President Jacques Chirac. The definitive stamp series was issued January 2005 under the name Marianne des Français.
