= Thésée, Loir-et-Cher =

Thésée
- Commune
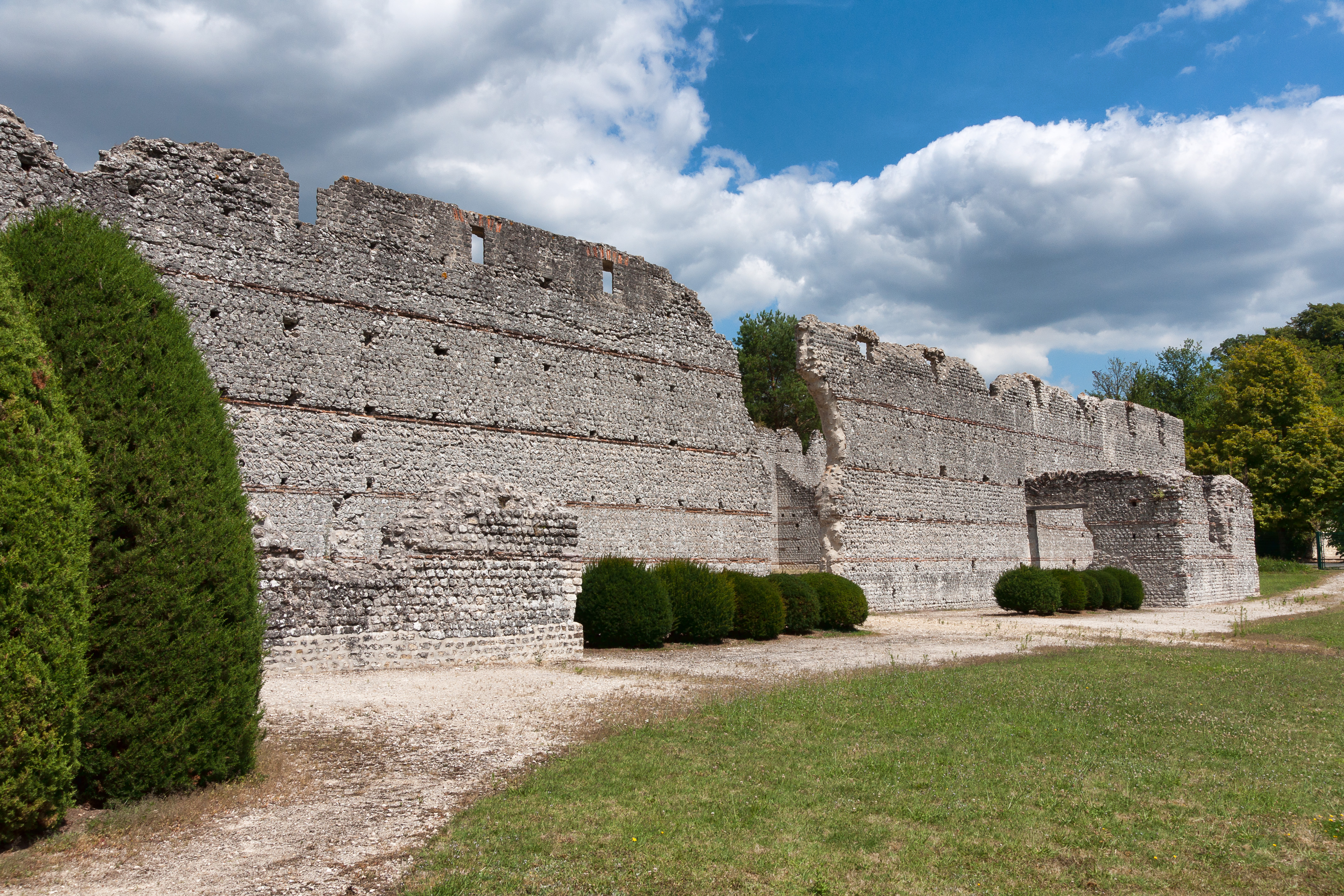
- Bâtiment des Maselles, Gallo-Roman ruins
- Location of Thésée
- Location within France Location within Centre-Val de Loire
- Coordinates: 47°19′37″N 1°18′16″E
- Country: France
- Region: Centre-Val de Loire
- Department: Loir-et-Cher
- Arrondissement: Romorantin-Lanthenay
- Canton: Saint-Aignan

Government
  - Mayor (2020–2026): Daniel Charluteau
- Area^{1}: 17.61 km^{2} (6.80 sq mi)
- Elevation: 70 m (230 ft)
- Highest elevation: 122 m (400 ft)
- Lowest elevation: 61 m (200 ft)
- Population (2023): 1,152
  - Density: 65.42/km^{2} (169.4/sq mi)
- Time zone: UTC+01:00 (CET)
  - Summer (DST): UTC+02:00 (CEST)
- INSEE/Postal code: 41258 /41140
- ^{1} French Land Register data, which excludes lakes, ponds, glaciers > 1 km^{2} (0.386 sq mi or 247 acres) and river estuaries.

Thésée (French pronunciation: [teze]) is a commune of the Loir-et-Cher department in central France.

== Population ==
Historical population
Year	Pop.	±% p.a.
1968	1,117	—
1975	1,075	−0.55%
1982	1,111	+0.47%
1990	1,074	−0.42%
1999	1,123	+0.50%
2007	1,204	+0.87%
2012	1,187	−0.28%
2017	1,132	−0.94%
2023	1,152	+0.29%
Source: INSEE

== See also ==
- Communes of the Loir-et-Cher department
