= Saint-Romain-sur-Cher =

- Commune
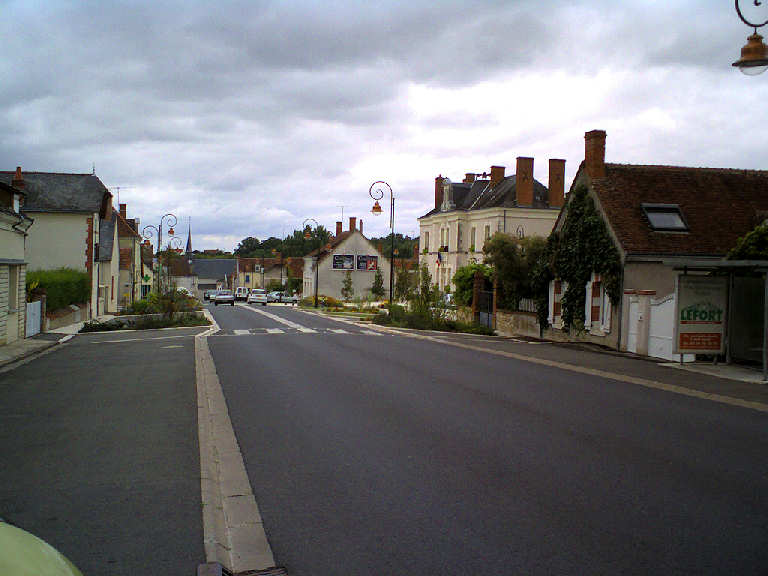
- Location of Saint-Romain-sur-Cher
- Location within France Location within Centre-Val de Loire
- Coordinates: 47°19′11″N 1°23′59″E
- Country: France
- Region: Centre-Val de Loire
- Department: Loir-et-Cher
- Arrondissement: Romorantin-Lanthenay
- Canton: Saint-Aignan

Government
  - Mayor (2020–2026): Michel Trotignon
- Area^{1}: 31.17 km^{2} (12.03 sq mi)
- Highest elevation: 120 m (390 ft)
- Lowest elevation: 64 m (210 ft)
- Population (2023): 1,473
  - Density: 47.26/km^{2} (122.4/sq mi)
- Time zone: UTC+01:00 (CET)
  - Summer (DST): UTC+02:00 (CEST)
- INSEE/Postal code: 41229 /41140
- ^{1} French Land Register data, which excludes lakes, ponds, glaciers > 1 km^{2} (0.386 sq mi or 247 acres) and river estuaries.

Saint-Romain-sur-Cher (French pronunciation: [sɛ̃ ʁomɛ̃ syʁ ʃɛʁ], literally Saint-Romain on Cher) is a commune in the Loir-et-Cher department of central France.

== Population ==
Historical population
Year	Pop.	±% p.a.
1968	1,087	—
1975	1,155	+0.87%
1982	1,213	+0.70%
1990	1,236	+0.24%
1999	1,289	+0.47%
2007	1,448	+1.46%
2012	1,506	+0.79%
2017	1,478	−0.37%
2023	1,473	−0.06%
Source: INSEE

== See also ==
- Communes of the Loir-et-Cher department
