= Marianne des Français series =

French stamp series

Marianne des Français (Marianne of the French) is a definitive stamp series. It has been issued in France since 10 January 2005. It was designed by Thierry Lamouche and engraved by Claude Jumelet.

== Description ==
The stamp represents Marianne, allegory of the French Republic, wearing as usual a tricolor cockade, and the Phrygian cap. She is depicted as emerging from a plant (see the two leaves on the bottom), smelling the air. Two birds flies in the sky. Doing this picture, Lamouche respected the terms of the national competition : Marianne and the environment.

Lamouche's original project was coloured on a white background. The stamp is white on a one-coloured background to help postmen and users to recognize the different denomination.

== The competition ==
Around 50 000 designs were received by the French Post. One hundred were selected by regional juries. Early 2004, people can vote for their most preferred projects. The ten more popular were shown on the front of the Palais Bourbon during Summer 2004.

Among these ten, President Jacques Chirac finally chose Thierry Lamouche's design. The first day of issue took place 8 January 2005 in the Palais Bourbon and in each départemental prefecture in the country.

== Postal history ==
In November 2004, the design was used on a postal stationery sold with a philatelic diary.

Eleven stamps were originally issued on 10 January 2005. They can be used in Metropolitan France, Guadeloupe, French Guiana, Martinique, Réunion, and overprinted for use in Mayotte and Saint-Pierre-et-Miquelon. But, a letter is known cancelled the 28 December 2004, in the Côtes-d'Armor.

As soon as 14 January, the red non-denominational stamp for a simple letter was reissued in a large format in profit of the French Red Cross. It cost 20 eurocents more than usual (50 cents in January) to finance a project in Lhokseumawe, Indonesia, after the 2004 Indian Ocean earthquake and tsunami.

Six new denominations were issued 1 March 2005 because of changes in postal tariffs. The newness was the creation of a European tariff. Before March 2005, a letter for France or the Western Europa cost the same price; since March 2005, a letter for a country of the European Union cost 2 cents more (€0.55 ).

== See also ==
- Marianne et l'Europe series
