= Châtillon-sur-Cher =

- Commune
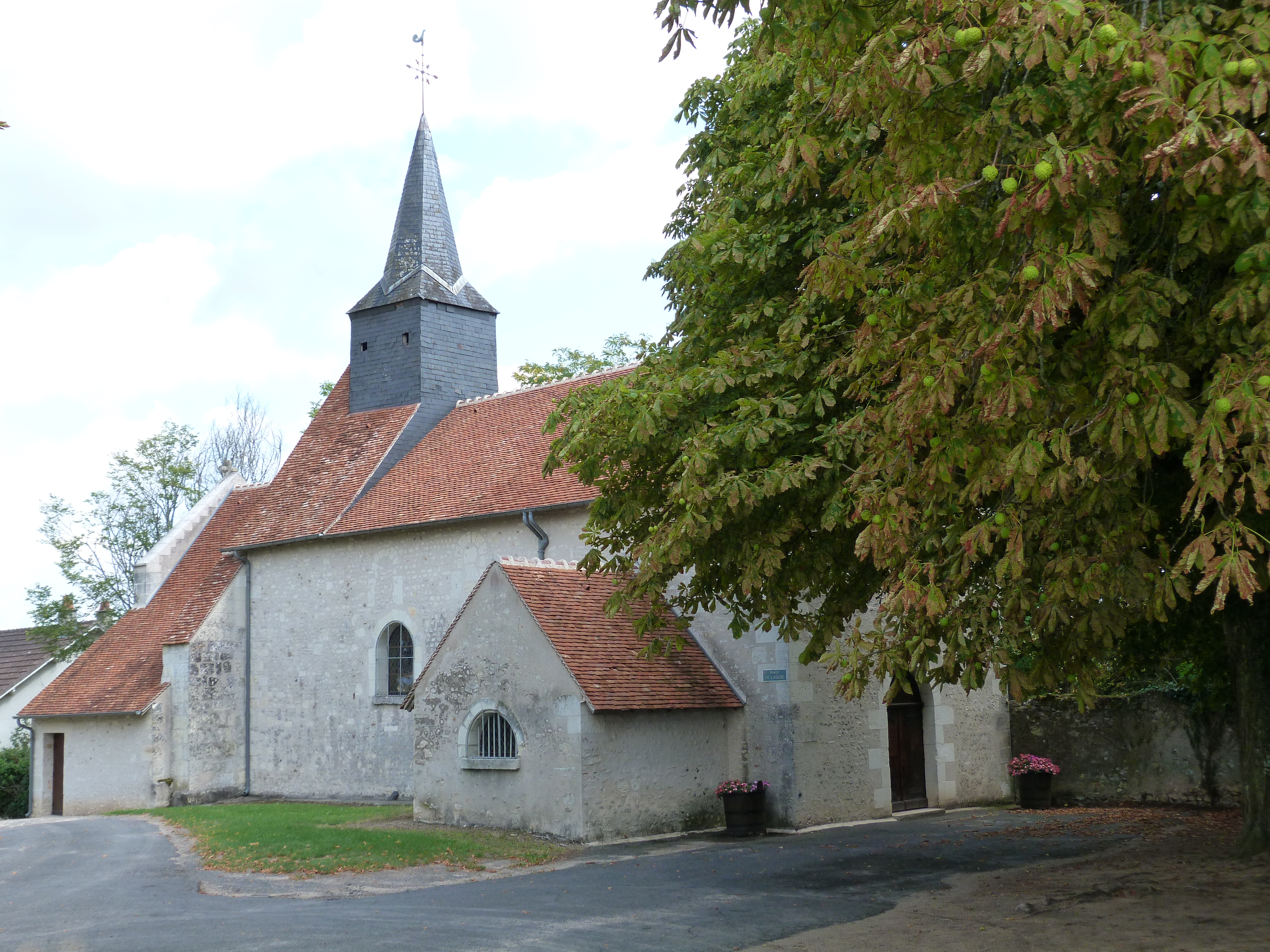

- Coat of arms
- Location of Châtillon-sur-Cher
- Location within France Location within Centre-Val de Loire
- Coordinates: 47°16′40″N 1°29′41″E
- Country: France
- Region: Centre-Val de Loire
- Department: Loir-et-Cher
- Arrondissement: Romorantin-Lanthenay
- Canton: Saint-Aignan

Government
  - Mayor (2020–2026): Alain Poma
- Area^{1}: 29.66 km^{2} (11.45 sq mi)
- Elevation: 93 m (305 ft)
- Highest elevation: 118 m (387 ft)
- Lowest elevation: 67 m (220 ft)
- Population (2023): 1,700
  - Density: 57/km^{2} (150/sq mi)
- Time zone: UTC+01:00 (CET)
  - Summer (DST): UTC+02:00 (CEST)
- INSEE/Postal code: 41043 /41130
- ^{1} French Land Register data, which excludes lakes, ponds, glaciers > 1 km^{2} (0.386 sq mi or 247 acres) and river estuaries.

Châtillon-sur-Cher (French pronunciation: [ʃatijɔ̃ syʁ ʃɛʁ]) is a commune in the Loir-et-Cher department in central France. It has a total area of 29.66 km sq (11.45 sq mi).

== Population ==
Historical population
Year	Pop.	±% p.a.
1968	1,333	—
1975	1,343	+0.11%
1982	1,289	−0.58%
1990	1,395	+0.99%
1999	1,516	+0.93%
2007	1,600	+0.68%
2012	1,732	+1.60%
2017	1,722	−0.12%
2023	1,700	−0.21%
Source: INSEE

== See also ==
- Communes of the Loir-et-Cher department
