= Angé =

- Commune
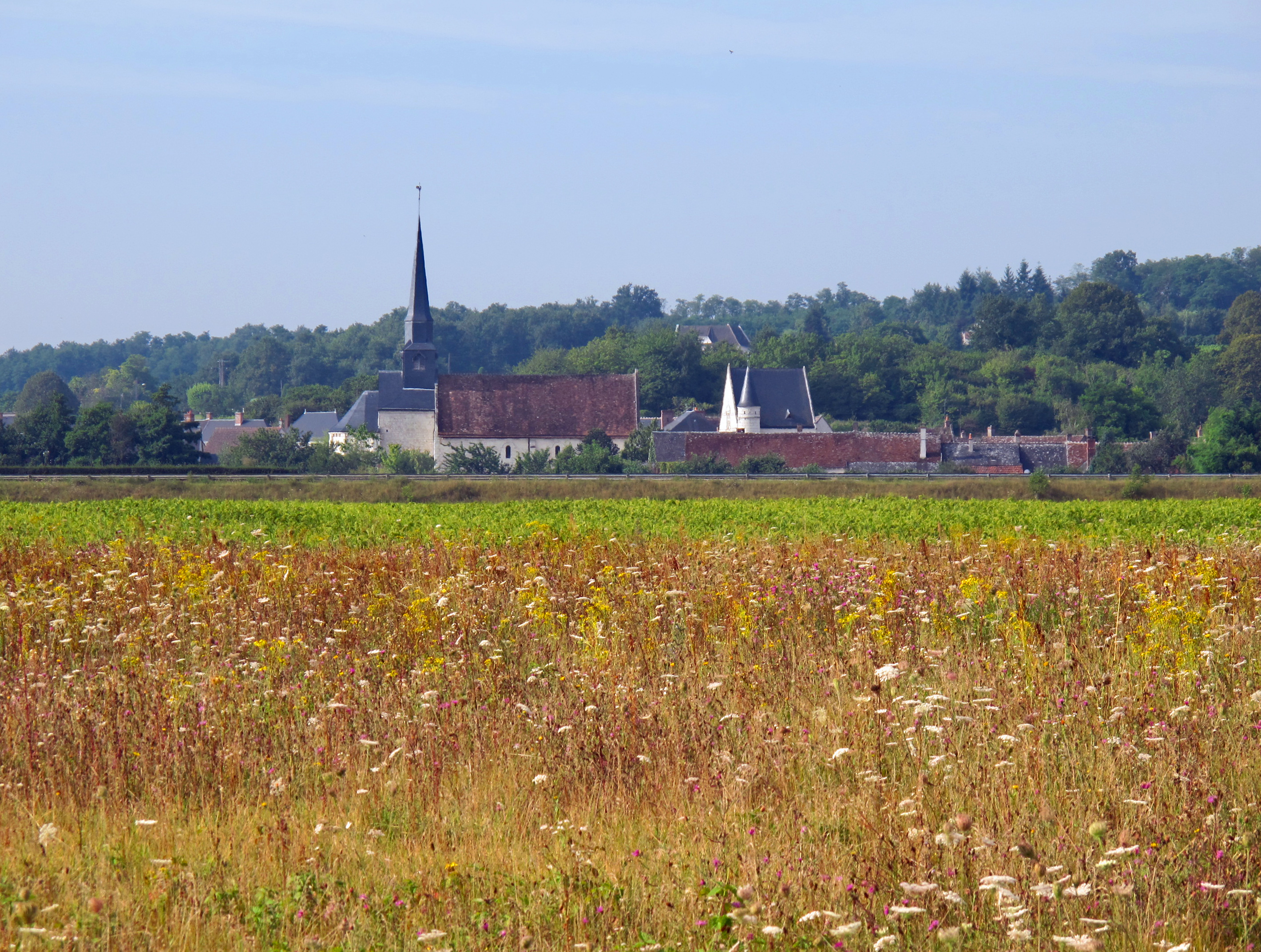
- Location of Angé
- Location within France Location within Centre-Val de Loire
- Coordinates: 47°19′55″N 1°14′38″E
- Country: France
- Region: Centre-Val de Loire
- Department: Loir-et-Cher
- Arrondissement: Romorantin-Lanthenay
- Canton: Saint-Aignan
- Intercommunality: Val de Cher - Controis

Government
  - Mayor (2021–2026): Daniel Boisgard
- Area^{1}: 17.36 km^{2} (6.70 sq mi)
- Elevation: 68 m (223 ft)
- Highest elevation: 172 m (564 ft)
- Lowest elevation: 59 m (194 ft)
- Population (2023): 795
  - Density: 45.8/km^{2} (119/sq mi)
- Time zone: UTC+01:00 (CET)
  - Summer (DST): UTC+02:00 (CEST)
- INSEE/Postal code: 41002 /41400
- ^{1} French Land Register data, which excludes lakes, ponds, glaciers > 1 km^{2} (0.386 sq mi or 247 acres) and river estuaries.

Angé (French pronunciation: [ɑ̃ʒe]) is a commune in the Loir-et-Cher department in central France.

== Population ==
Historical population
Year	Pop.	±% p.a.
1968	642	—
1975	650	+0.18%
1982	664	+0.30%
1990	751	+1.55%
1999	791	+0.58%
2007	780	−0.17%
2012	848	+1.69%
2017	882	+0.79%
2023	795	−1.72%
Source: INSEE

== See also ==
- Communes of the Loir-et-Cher department
