= Soings-en-Sologne =

- Commune
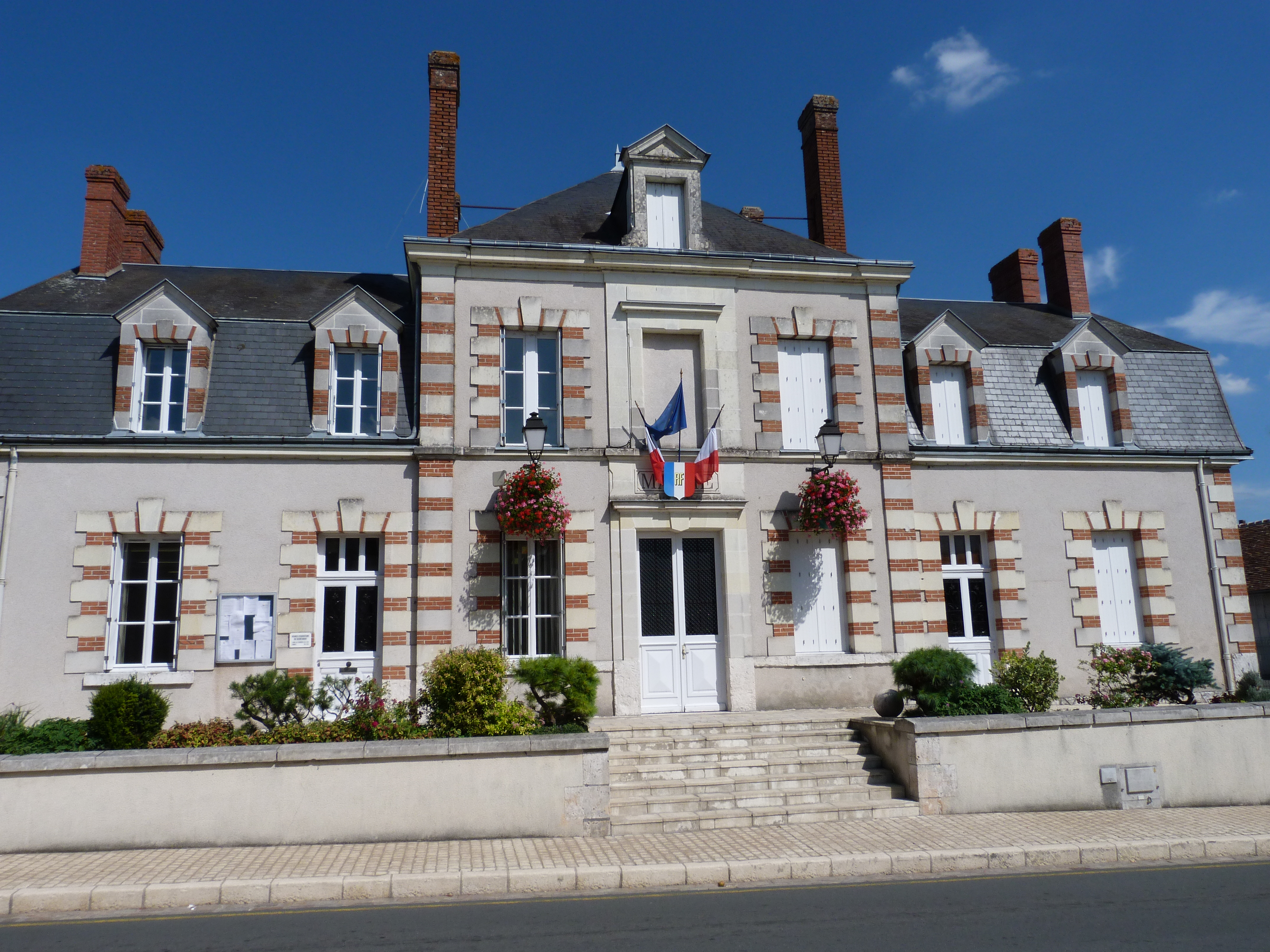
- Town hall

- Coat of arms
- Location of Soings-en-Sologne
- Location within France Location within Centre-Val de Loire
- Coordinates: 47°24′51″N 1°31′33″E
- Country: France
- Region: Centre-Val de Loire
- Department: Loir-et-Cher
- Arrondissement: Romorantin-Lanthenay
- Canton: Saint-Aignan
- Intercommunality: Val-de-Cher-Controis

Government
  - Mayor (2020–2026): Bernard Biette
- Area^{1}: 35.3 km^{2} (13.6 sq mi)
- Elevation: 96 m (315 ft)
- Highest elevation: 137 m (449 ft)
- Lowest elevation: 92 m (302 ft)
- Population (2023): 1,546
  - Density: 43.8/km^{2} (113/sq mi)
- Time zone: UTC+01:00 (CET)
  - Summer (DST): UTC+02:00 (CEST)
- INSEE/Postal code: 41247 /41230
- ^{1} French Land Register data, which excludes lakes, ponds, glaciers > 1 km^{2} (0.386 sq mi or 247 acres) and river estuaries.

Soings-en-Sologne (French pronunciation: [swɛ̃ ɑ̃ sɔlɔɲ], lit. 'Soings in Sologne') is a commune and town in the French department of Loir-et-Cher, administrative region of Centre-Val de Loire.

== Population ==
Historical population
Year	Pop.	±% p.a.
1968	1,324	—
1975	1,314	−0.11%
1982	1,259	−0.61%
1990	1,289	+0.29%
1999	1,314	+0.21%
2007	1,487	+1.56%
2012	1,583	+1.26%
2017	1,614	+0.39%
2023	1,546	−0.71%
Source: INSEE

== See also ==
- Communes of the Loir-et-Cher department
