= Eccentric flint =

Mayan archaeological artifact

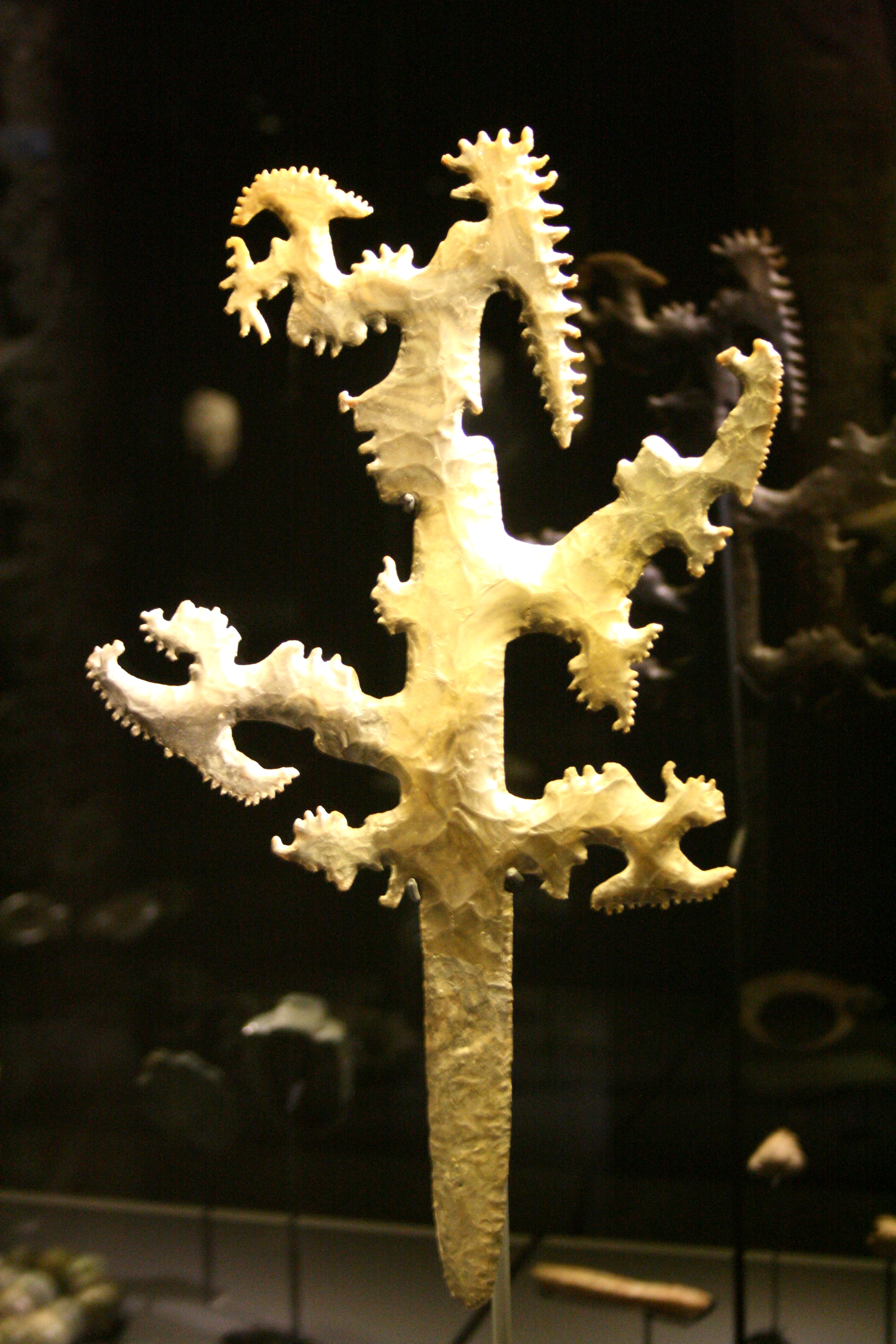
Fig. 1 Eccentric flint in the Musées Royaux d'Art et d'Histoire in Brussels

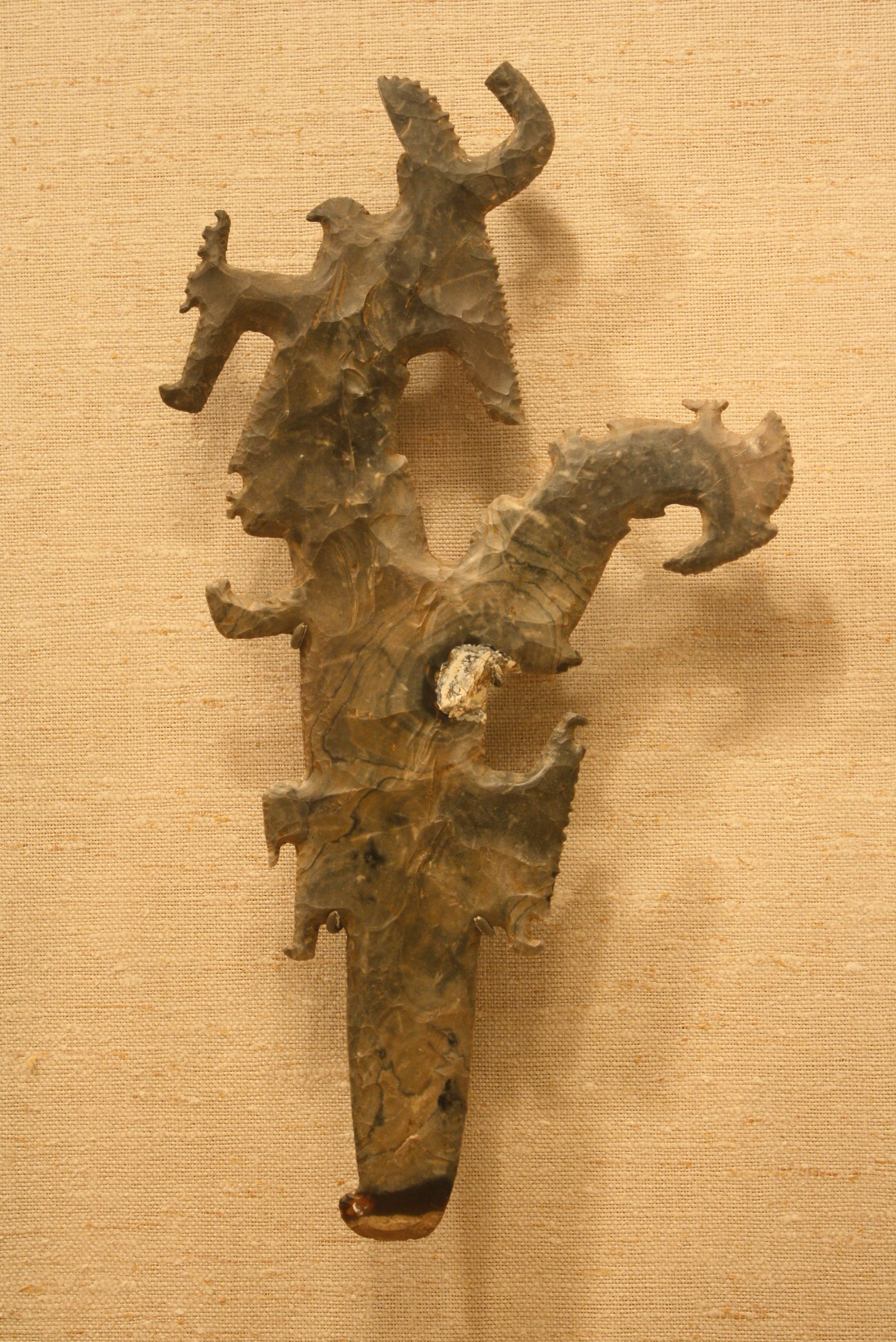
Fig. 2 Eccentric flint from Guatemala in the Metropolitan Museum of Art in New York

An eccentric flint is an elite chipped artifact of an often irregular ('eccentric') shape produced by the Classic Maya civilization of ancient Mesoamerica. Although generally referred to as "flints", they were typically fashioned from chert, chalcedony and obsidian.

== Distribution ==
Eccentric flints were first categorised by western archaeologists in Belize in the first half of the 20th century, when they were identified as ceremonial in nature. The objects are generally found in the eastern portion of the central Maya area, in the Petén Department of Guatemala and in neighbouring Belize, with few in the west and the Yucatán Peninsula. Very few have been recovered from the Guatemalan Highlands and it is unlikely they were ever manufactured there. Small obsidian eccentrics have been found at the great metropolis of Teotihuacan in the Valley of Mexico.

== Physical characteristics ==
Eccentric flints are among the finest lithic artifacts produced by the ancient Maya. They were very technically challenging to produce, requiring considerable skill on the part of the artisan. Large obsidian eccentrics can measure over 30 centimetres (12 in) in length. Their actual form varies considerably but they generally depict human, animal and geometric forms associated with Maya religion.

== Context and possible use ==
Most examples of eccentric flints have been recovered from caches interred under Maya monuments and buildings. Thus, a cache under the altar of Copan's stela M, at the foot of the Hieroglyphic Stairway, rendered three identical eccentric flints, each shaped like a human figure extending into a tang and evincing six human head outgrowths. Nine eccentric flints with human figures found in an early Copan temple room (temple 16, Rosalila phase), and originally wrapped in a deep blue cloth, show similar tangs. The presence of these tangs suggests that the examples concerned may originally have been set into a shaft or handle, possibly as the head of a sceptre, or as the blade of an axe. Some flint eccentrics were unsuitable for wearing or carrying and they may have been sculpted specifically to be buried as an offering.

== Subjects depicted ==
Eccentric flints show a great variety of forms, such as crescents, crosses, snakes, and scorpions. The largest and most elaborate ones display multiple human heads, with minor heads sometimes branching off from larger ones (see fig. 1). The human face is youthful and crafted as a simple outline, with emphasis on the sloping forehead and the lips. An element more or less resembling a smoking torch, and symbolizing lightning, is often set in the forehead (see fig. 2). For this reason, these human faces are commonly regarded as transformations of the lightning deity, god K (K'awiil). More specifically, they appear to represent the Tonsured Maize God as a lightning deity, perhaps in a protective role. Eccentric flints representing the lightning deity himself are also found, though with less frequency, while some eccentric flints combine both human and God K faces. The most famous eccentric flint is perhaps the one interpreted by Linda Schele and her co-authors as a 'crocodile canoe' transporting the anthropomorphic soul of the dead as its 'passenger'.

== Anthropological background ==
As a background to the eccentric flints showing deities associated with lightning, it is noteworthy that among the traditional Maya and in Mesoamerica generally, obsidian is considered "fossilized lightning", sometimes believed to have split off from the lightning deities' axes. The lightning deity warrants agricultural fertility. As to the 'lightnings' with a human aspect, certain powerful individuals are believed to possess lightning energies, and to have the lightning bolt for a transformation.
