= Mareuil-sur-Cher =

- Commune
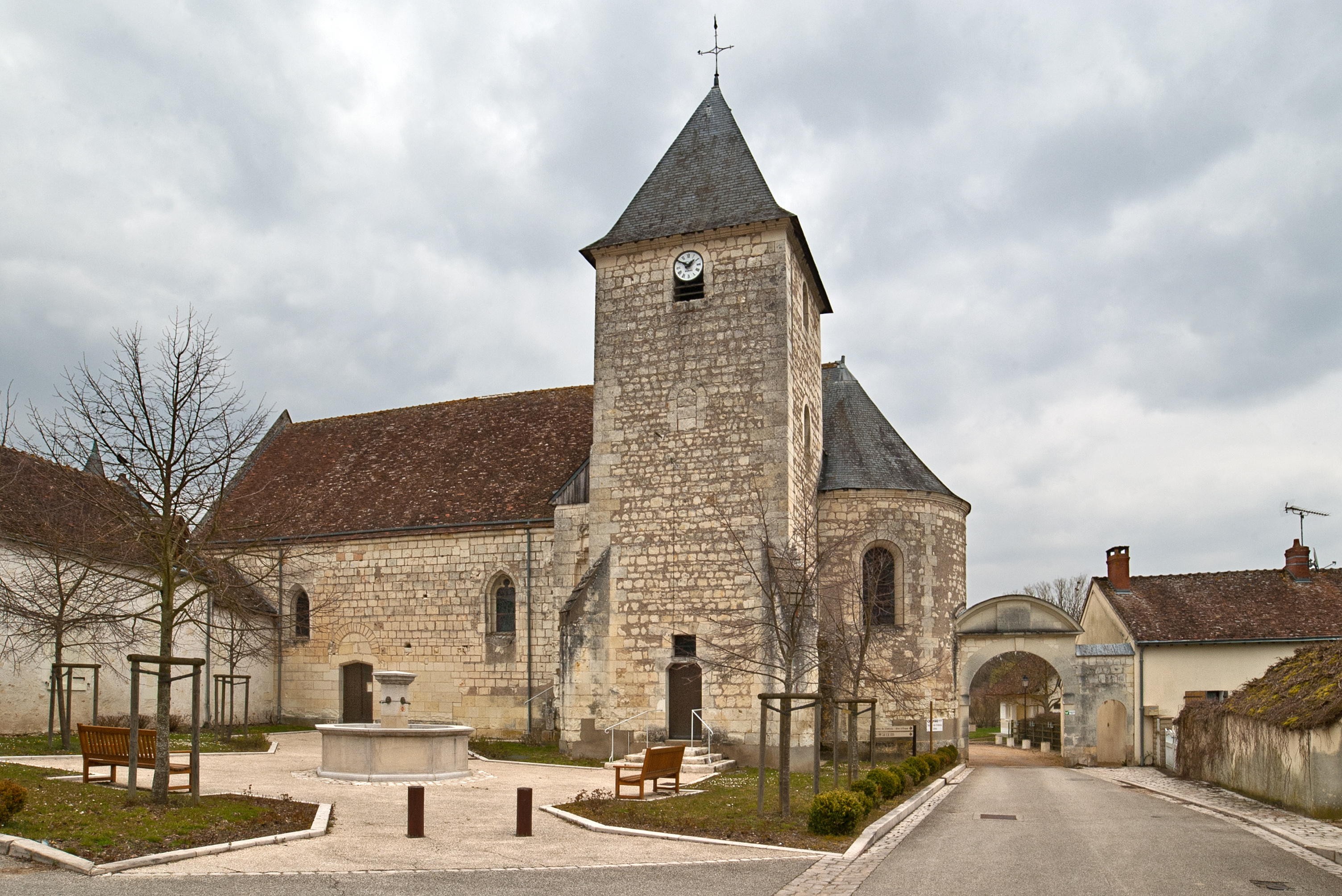
- Église Saint-Martin

- Coat of arms
- Location of Mareuil-sur-Cher
- Location within France Location within Centre-Val de Loire
- Coordinates: 47°17′36″N 1°19′47″E
- Country: France
- Region: Centre-Val de Loire
- Department: Loir-et-Cher
- Arrondissement: Romorantin-Lanthenay
- Canton: Saint-Aignan
- Intercommunality: CC Val-de-Cher-Controis

Government
  - Mayor (2020–2026): Annick Goineau
- Area^{1}: 31.88 km^{2} (12.31 sq mi)
- Elevation: 130 m (430 ft)
- Highest elevation: 186 m (610 ft)
- Lowest elevation: 64 m (210 ft)
- Population (2023): 1,150
  - Density: 36.1/km^{2} (93.4/sq mi)
- Demonym: Mareuillais
- Time zone: UTC+01:00 (CET)
  - Summer (DST): UTC+02:00 (CEST)
- INSEE/Postal code: 41126 /41110
- ^{1} French Land Register data, which excludes lakes, ponds, glaciers > 1 km^{2} (0.386 sq mi or 247 acres) and river estuaries.

Mareuil-sur-Cher (French pronunciation: [maʁœj syʁ ʃɛʁ]; lit. 'Mareuil-on-Cher') is a rural commune in the Loir-et-Cher department of central France.

== Population ==
Historical population
Year	Pop.	±% p.a.
1968	1,033	—
1975	1,101	+0.91%
1982	963	−1.89%
1990	977	+0.18%
1999	957	−0.23%
2007	1,068	+1.38%
2012	1,133	+1.19%
2017	1,142	+0.16%
2023	1,150	+0.12%
Source: INSEE

== See also ==
- Communes of the Loir-et-Cher department
