= Maya dedication rituals =

The Classic Maya used dedication rituals to sanctify their living spaces and family members by associating their physical world with supernatural concepts through religious practice. The existence of such rituals is inferred from the frequent occurrence of so-called 'dedication' or 'votive' cache deposits in an archaeological context.

== Caches ==
Caches can be found in the Maya common places and public buildings, which contained objects made or found by commoners. More specifically, these caches were usually found in fields or family altars, and contained less valuable materials such as ceramic vessels, copal, food, and drink. These dedication cache materials relate more closely to household tasks, such as preparing food or working a field. The content and placement of these caches suggests a request for aid in acquiring daily necessities, such as food, as they dedicated their work places and homes to deities in exchange for a better harvest or other living needs. These contents also relate closely to the common mesoamerican idea that the people have an obligation to nourish the life-providing Earth as it does them.

The location of a cache in relation to others can also play a significant role in dedication rituals. At the Classic Maya site in Tonina, three caches covered by a circular stone mark the north, south, and center of a ballcourt alley. The north and south caches contained eight obsidian blades, likely used in bloodletting, whereas the center cache contained nine. The number nine represents death and the underworld, dedicating the ballcourt to those concepts and deity, as well as emphasizing the directions of the Earth. Including this example, caches mark the center of nine ballcourts across Belize, Chiapas, and Central Mexico. Ballcourts were commissioned by the elite, and hosted ritual activities for the elite and commoners, associating them with power and wealth. These caches then dedicated the ballcourts, including their power and rituals, to Classic Maya deities.

== Burials ==
Dedication rituals through burial were most common in the Maya highlands, in which they were used to commemorate dead ancestors, make an offering to their deities, and give life or nourishment to the community or structure the ritual serves.

In Maya cultures, elites were buried as cremations in urns. Dedicated to their power, large ritual structures such as temples were built above these burials. The Maya Tikal Triple Ballcourt held two young female burials placed facing each other inside benches located under a central structure. Dedicatory burials are unique in that they utilize ancestors to worship ancestors, as well as provide an offering that had also once provided offerings to their deities, signifying both power and life-giving.

== Sacrifice ==
Bodily sacrifice was commonplace in dedication rituals, whether in bloodletting or sacrificing a war victim, one of the many sacrificial rituals employed in Mesoamerica and perhaps during war the chief's daughter just for good luck . Sacrifice specifically represents a returning of life to the Earth and deities, who were seen as life-providers for the Mesoamerican people. The importance of sacrifice in Classic Maya culture can be seen in Structure O-13 at Piedras Negras where vessels of obsidian blades, stingray spines, and other bloodletting utensils lined the pathway along the structure. These materials increased in count along the pathway, leading to a main room in which sacrifice rituals took place. These materials and their context clearly dedicate Structure O-13 to deity worship through sacrificial offerings.

== Writing ==
Sacred writings were also used as dedicatory devices in ritual structures. The art of writing was controlled by the elite in Mesoamerica, and the skill passed down linearly. An example of this can be seen in Classic Maya Chichen Itza, in which elite women created architectural texts dedicating structures to their female ancestors and patron deities. These gender-specific deities were given significant attention through the dedication of structures in their possession. Structure 23 in Yaxchilan embodies this concept with sacred writings, often including an initial glyph, verb, noun, prepositional phrase, and most importantly, the name of a possessor of the structure. This is so significant in dedication ritual because writing the name of a possessor to which the structure is dedicated gives permanence to that ownership. The quality of permanence held in writing dedication rituals gives power and importance to the relationship it creates.

== Termination ritual ==
As the complement and counterpart of dedication ritual, termination ritual serves to destroy the link between a structure and the deity to which it was dedicated. In Temple XIV of Cerros, Belize, jade artifacts were found scattered and smashed on the floor of the temple, which had presumably once served in dedication caches for the same temple. Destroying these creations ceases their representation of the cosmos and religious ideas and ends the relationship between those ideas and the structure.

== Bibliography ==
- Shirley Boteler Mock (ed.), The Sowing and the Dawning: Termination, Dedication, and Transformation in the Archaeological and Ethnographic Record of Mesoamerica. Albuquerque: University of New Mexico Press, 1998. vi + 198 pp. $75.00 (library), ISBN 978-0-8263-1983-8.
