= Meusnes =

- Commune
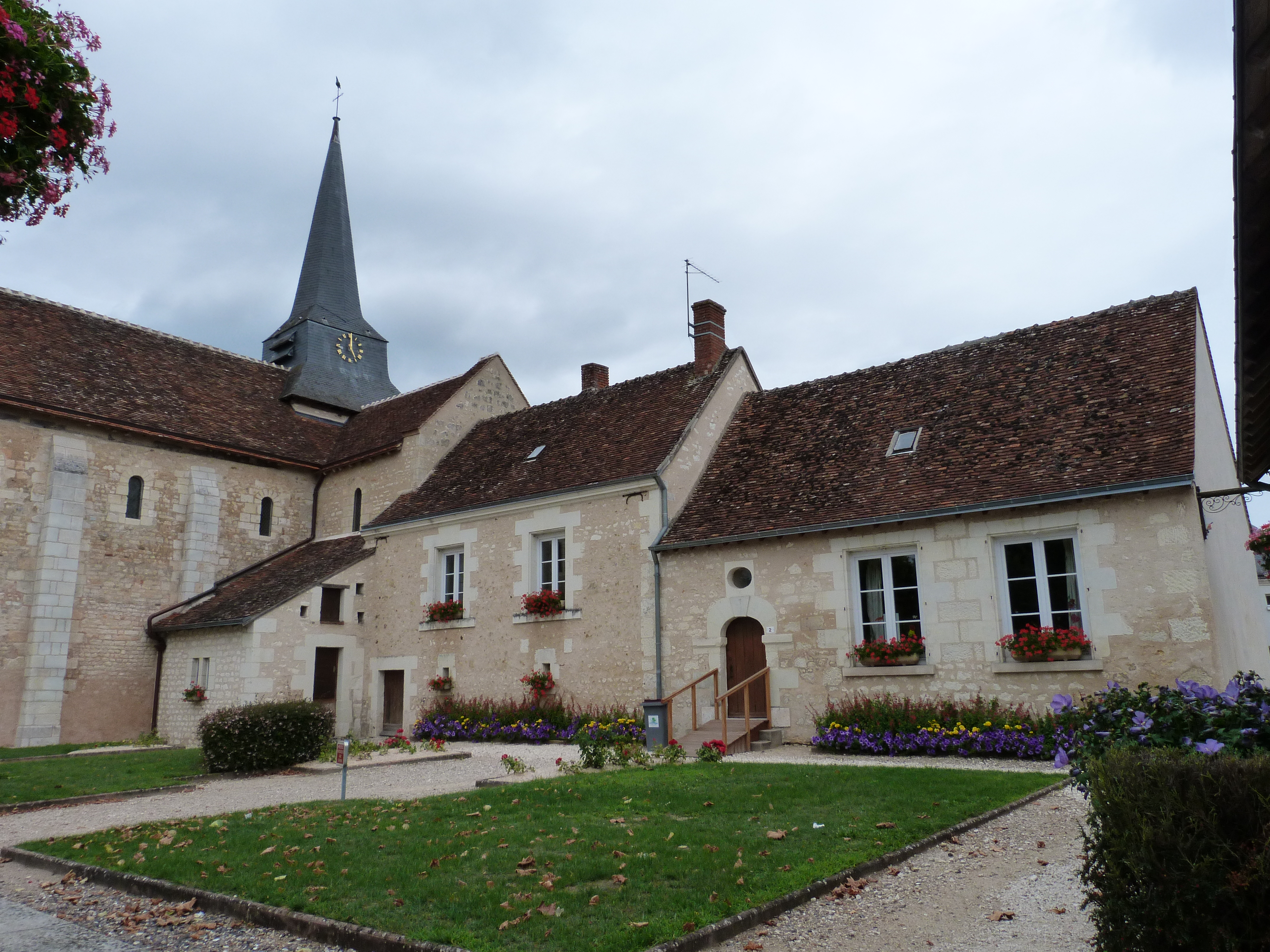
- Location of Meusnes
- Location within France Location within Centre-Val de Loire
- Coordinates: 47°15′04″N 1°29′51″E
- Country: France
- Region: Centre-Val de Loire
- Department: Loir-et-Cher
- Arrondissement: Romorantin-Lanthenay
- Canton: Saint-Aignan
- Intercommunality: Val-de-Cher-Controis

Government
  - Mayor (2022–2026): Patrick Gibault
- Area^{1}: 13.35 km^{2} (5.15 sq mi)
- Elevation: 84 m (276 ft)
- Highest elevation: 132 m (433 ft)
- Lowest elevation: 68 m (223 ft)
- Population (2023): 1,013
  - Density: 75.88/km^{2} (196.5/sq mi)
- Time zone: UTC+01:00 (CET)
  - Summer (DST): UTC+02:00 (CEST)
- INSEE/Postal code: 41139 /41130
- ^{1} French Land Register data, which excludes lakes, ponds, glaciers > 1 km^{2} (0.386 sq mi or 247 acres) and river estuaries.

Meusnes (French pronunciation: [mœn]) is a commune in the Loir-et-Cher department of central France.

== History ==
The church of Saint-Pierre dates from the 12th century and is built in the typical Romanesque basilica style: cross shaped with three apses at the east end.

== Population ==
Historical population
Year	Pop.	±% p.a.
1968	987	—
1975	937	−0.74%
1982	1,017	+1.18%
1990	1,009	−0.10%
1999	945	−0.73%
2007	1,009	+0.82%
2012	1,073	+1.24%
2017	1,097	+0.44%
2023	1,013	−1.32%
Source: INSEE

== See also ==
- Communes of the Loir-et-Cher department
