= Couffy =

- Commune
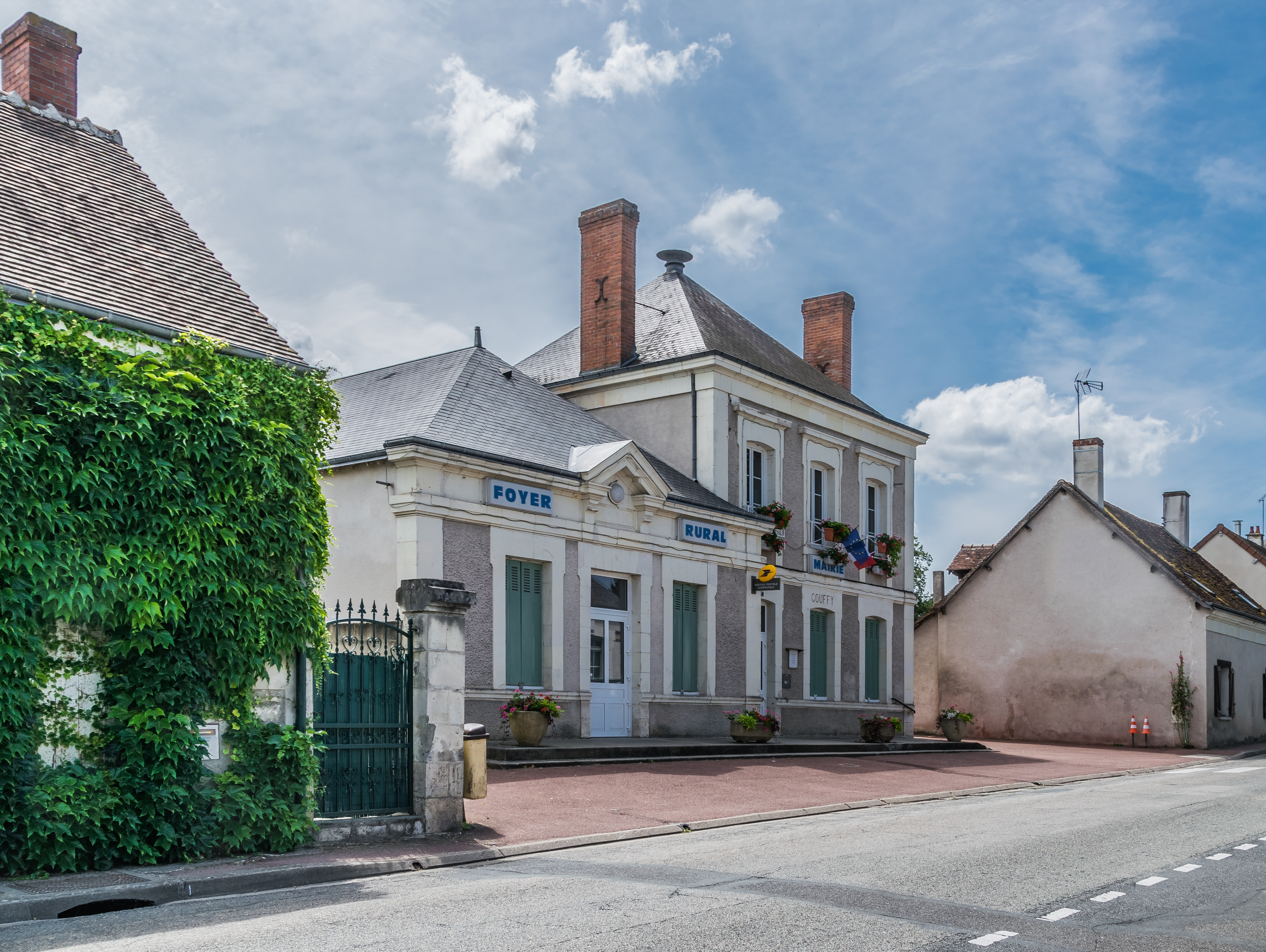

- Coat of arms
- Location of Couffy
- Location within France Location within Centre-Val de Loire
- Coordinates: 47°14′54″N 1°26′25″E
- Country: France
- Region: Centre-Val de Loire
- Department: Loir-et-Cher
- Arrondissement: Romorantin-Lanthenay
- Canton: Saint-Aignan

Government
  - Mayor (2020–2026): Jean-Pierre Épiais
- Area^{1}: 14.92 km^{2} (5.76 sq mi)
- Highest elevation: 134 m (440 ft)
- Lowest elevation: 67 m (220 ft)
- Population (2023): 506
  - Density: 33.9/km^{2} (87.8/sq mi)
- Time zone: UTC+01:00 (CET)
  - Summer (DST): UTC+02:00 (CEST)
- INSEE/Postal code: 41063 /41110
- ^{1} French Land Register data, which excludes lakes, ponds, glaciers > 1 km^{2} (0.386 sq mi or 247 acres) and river estuaries.

Couffy (French pronunciation: [kufi], before 1998: Couffi) is a commune in the Loir-et-Cher department of central France.

== Population ==
Historical population
Year	Pop.	±% p.a.
1968	548	—
1975	560	+0.31%
1982	515	−1.19%
1990	559	+1.03%
1999	557	−0.04%
2007	559	+0.04%
2012	536	−0.84%
2017	497	−1.50%
2023	506	+0.30%
Source: INSEE

== Sights ==
The church of Saint-Martin dates from the 11th century, but the only part remaining of the original building is the main doorway in the west tower. The main body of the church was rebuilt towards the end of the 12th century in the Primitive Gothic style. The nave was remodelled towards the end of the 15th century with ribbed vaulting spanning three bays.

== See also ==
- Communes of the Loir-et-Cher department
