= Canton of Le Châtelet =

Coordinates: 46°38′33″N 2°17′2″E

Le Châtelet
- Former canton
- Interactive map of Le Châtelet
- Country: France
- Region: Centre-Val de Loire
- Department: Cher
- No. of communes: {{{nbcomm}}}
- Disbanded: 2015
- Area: 179.15 km^{2} (69.17 sq mi)
- Population (2012): 2,710
  - Density: 15.1/km^{2} (39.2/sq mi)

The Canton of Le Châtelet is a former canton situated in the Cher département and in the Centre region of France. It was disbanded following the French canton reorganisation which came into effect in March 2015. It consisted of 7 communes, which joined the canton of Châteaumeillant in 2015. It had 2,710 inhabitants (2012).

== Geography ==
An area of lakes, rivers and farming in the southwestern part of the arrondissement of Saint-Amand-Montrond centred on the town of Le Châtelet. The altitude varies from 165m at Ids-Saint-Roch to 276m at Le Châtelet, with an average altitude of 215m.

The canton comprised 7 communes:

- Ardenais
- Le Châtelet
- Ids-Saint-Roch
- Maisonnais
- Morlac
- Rezay
- Saint-Pierre-les-Bois

== Population ==
Historical population Canton of Le Châtelet
Year	1962	1968	1975	1982	1990	1999
Pop.	3,249	3,545	3,148	2,845	2,672	2,610
±%	—	+9.1%	−11.2%	−9.6%	−6.1%	−2.3%
From the year 1962 on: No double counting – residents of multiple communes (e.g. students and military personnel) are counted only once. Source: INSEE

== See also ==
- Arrondissements of the Cher department
- Cantons of the Cher department
- Communes of the Cher department
