= Agnes, Countess of Aix =

Medieval healer and the first prioress of the Orsan Priory

Agnes, Countess of Aix-en-Berry (fl. 1080–1120) was a medieval healer and the first prioress of the Orsan Priory.

Agnes was the first wife of Alard de Guillebaud, lord of Châteaumeillant; when the marriage was dissolved by reason of consanguinity, Agnes retired to Fontevraud Abbey. In 1107, Alard donated lands for the foundation of a Fontevrist monastery near Orsan (modern Maisonnais) to Robert of Arbrissel at the urging of Leger, Archbishop of Bourges; Agnes became the first prioress of the resulting monastery. She was reputed to be a healer of considerable skill, and attended Robert on his death bed.
