= Arcomps =

- Commune
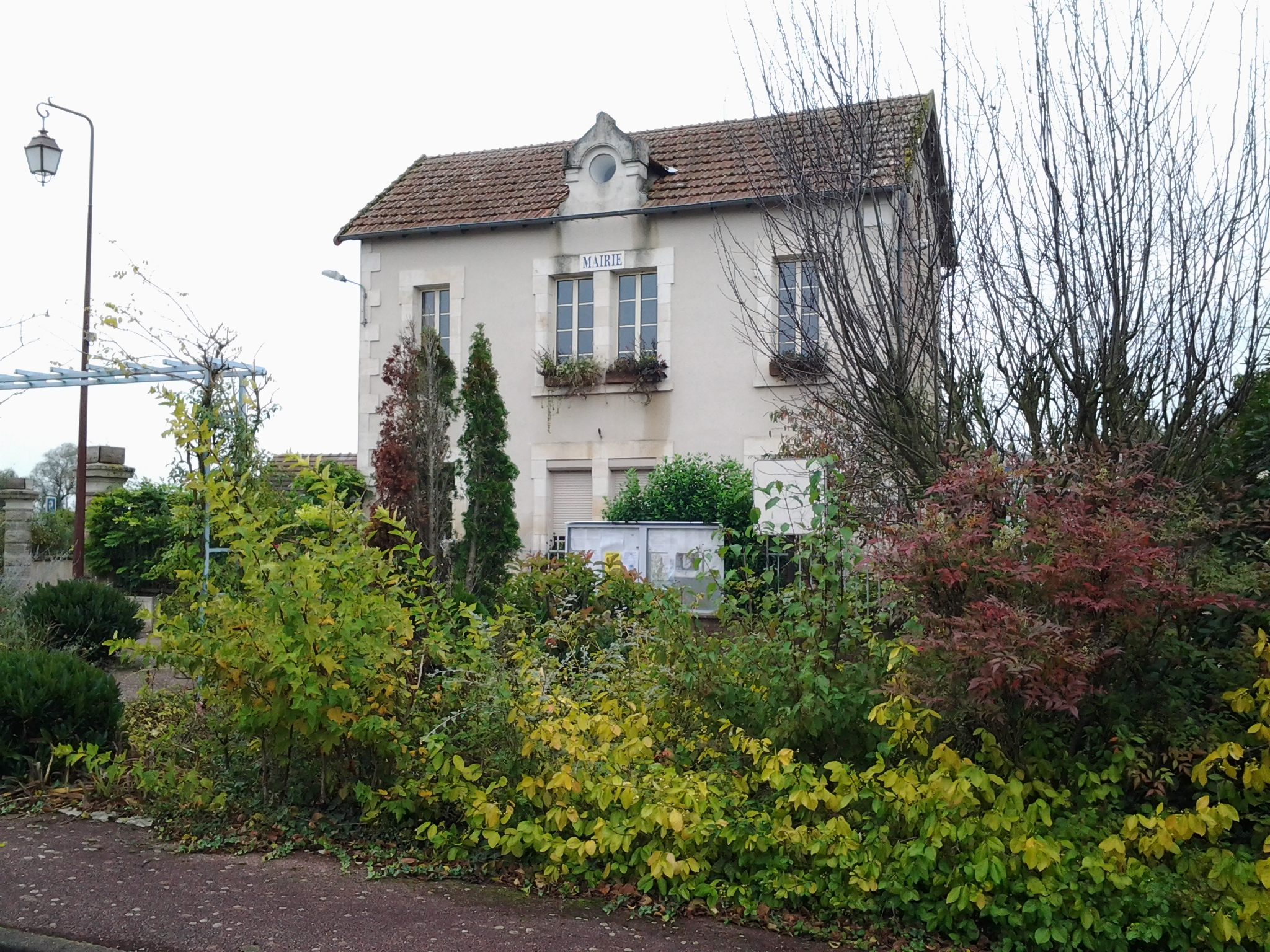
- The town hall in Arcomps
- Location of Arcomps
- Location within France Location within Centre-Val de Loire
- Coordinates: 46°40′36″N 2°26′01″E
- Country: France
- Region: Centre-Val de Loire
- Department: Cher
- Arrondissement: Saint-Amand-Montrond
- Canton: Châteaumeillant
- Intercommunality: Berry Grand Sud

Government
  - Mayor (2020–2026): Jean-Louis Caors
- Area^{1}: 20.14 km^{2} (7.78 sq mi)
- Elevation: 200 m (660 ft)
- Highest elevation: 228 m (748 ft)
- Lowest elevation: 169 m (554 ft)
- Population (2023): 280
  - Density: 14/km^{2} (36/sq mi)
- Time zone: UTC+01:00 (CET)
  - Summer (DST): UTC+02:00 (CEST)
- INSEE/Postal code: 18009 /18200
- ^{1} French Land Register data, which excludes lakes, ponds, glaciers > 1 km^{2} (0.386 sq mi or 247 acres) and river estuaries.

Arcomps (French pronunciation: [aʁkɔ̃]) is a commune in the Cher department in the Centre-Val de Loire region of France about 29 miles (47 km) south of Bourges. The commune is the source of several small tributaries of the Cher.

== Population ==
Historical population
Year	Pop.	±% p.a.
1968	344	—
1975	347	+0.12%
1982	310	−1.60%
1990	287	−0.96%
1999	286	−0.04%
2007	292	+0.26%
2012	302	+0.68%
2017	306	+0.26%
2023	280	−1.47%
Source: INSEE

== See also ==
- Communes of the Cher department
