= Faverdines =

- Commune
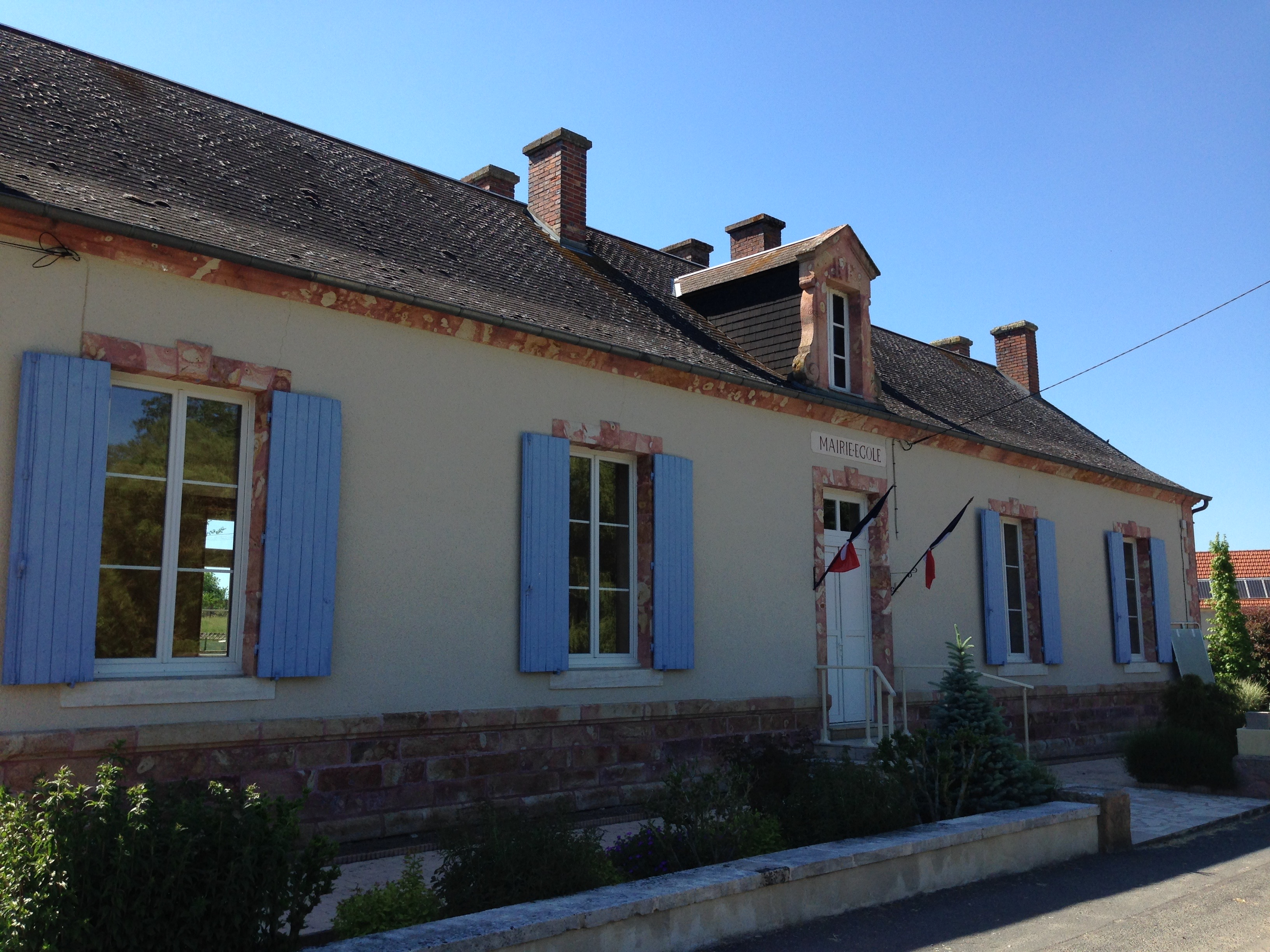
- Town hall
- Location of Faverdines
- Location within France Location within Centre-Val de Loire
- Coordinates: 46°38′22″N 2°28′37″E
- Country: France
- Region: Centre-Val de Loire
- Department: Cher
- Arrondissement: Saint-Amand-Montrond
- Canton: Châteaumeillant

Government
  - Mayor (2026–32): David Cassonnet
- Area^{1}: 18.51 km^{2} (7.15 sq mi)
- Elevation: 187 m (614 ft)
- Highest elevation: 239 m (784 ft)
- Lowest elevation: 172 m (564 ft)
- Population (2023): 135
  - Density: 7.29/km^{2} (18.9/sq mi)
- Time zone: UTC+01:00 (CET)
  - Summer (DST): UTC+02:00 (CEST)
- INSEE/Postal code: 18093 /18360
- ^{1} French Land Register data, which excludes lakes, ponds, glaciers > 1 km^{2} (0.386 sq mi or 247 acres) and river estuaries.

Faverdines (French pronunciation: [favɛʁdin]) is a commune in the Cher department in the Centre-Val de Loire region of France.

== Geography ==
An area of forestry and farming, comprising the village and several hamlets situated by the banks of the small river Loubière, some 26 miles (42 km) south of Bourges at the junction of the D140 and the D1 roads. The A71 autoroute runs through the eastern part of the commune's territory.

== Population ==
Historical population
Year	Pop.	±% p.a.
1968	203	—
1975	147	−4.51%
1982	147	+0.00%
1990	139	−0.70%
1999	136	−0.24%
2007	139	+0.27%
2012	151	+1.67%
2017	142	−1.22%
2023	135	−0.84%
Source: INSEE

== Sights ==
- The fourteenth-century church of St. Aignan.
- The vestiges of a fortified feudal manorhouse at Chaudenay.

== See also ==
- Communes of the Cher department
