= La Chapelle-Hugon =

- Commune
- Location of La Chapelle-Hugon
- Location within France Location within Centre-Val de Loire
- Coordinates: 46°54′28″N 2°56′56″E
- Country: France
- Region: Centre-Val de Loire
- Department: Cher
- Arrondissement: Saint-Amand-Montrond
- Canton: La Guerche-sur-l'Aubois

Government
  - Mayor (2020–2026): Jean-Yves Giot
- Area^{1}: 16.16 km^{2} (6.24 sq mi)
- Elevation: 191 m (627 ft)
- Highest elevation: 225 m (738 ft)
- Lowest elevation: 180 m (590 ft)
- Population (2023): 387
  - Density: 23.9/km^{2} (62.0/sq mi)
- Time zone: UTC+01:00 (CET)
  - Summer (DST): UTC+02:00 (CEST)
- INSEE/Postal code: 18048 /18150
- ^{1} French Land Register data, which excludes lakes, ponds, glaciers > 1 km^{2} (0.386 sq mi or 247 acres) and river estuaries.

La Chapelle-Hugon (French pronunciation: [la ʃapɛl yɡɔ̃]) is a commune in the Cher department in the Centre-Val de Loire region of France.

== Geography ==
An area of forestry and farming comprising the village and several hamlets situated by the banks of the canal de Berry and the river Aubois, some 25 miles (40 km) southeast of Bourges at the junction of the D100 and the D920 roads.

== Population ==
Historical population
Year	Pop.	±% p.a.
1968	366	—
1975	305	−2.57%
1982	327	+1.00%
1990	364	+1.35%
1999	376	+0.36%
2007	379	+0.10%
2012	394	+0.78%
2017	387	−0.36%
2023	387	+0.00%
Source: INSEE

== Sights ==
- The church of Saintes Etienne and Martin, dating from the twelfth century
- A watermill
- The seventeenth-century chateau des Bordes.

== See also ==
- Communes of the Cher department
