= Saint-Jeanvrin =

- Commune
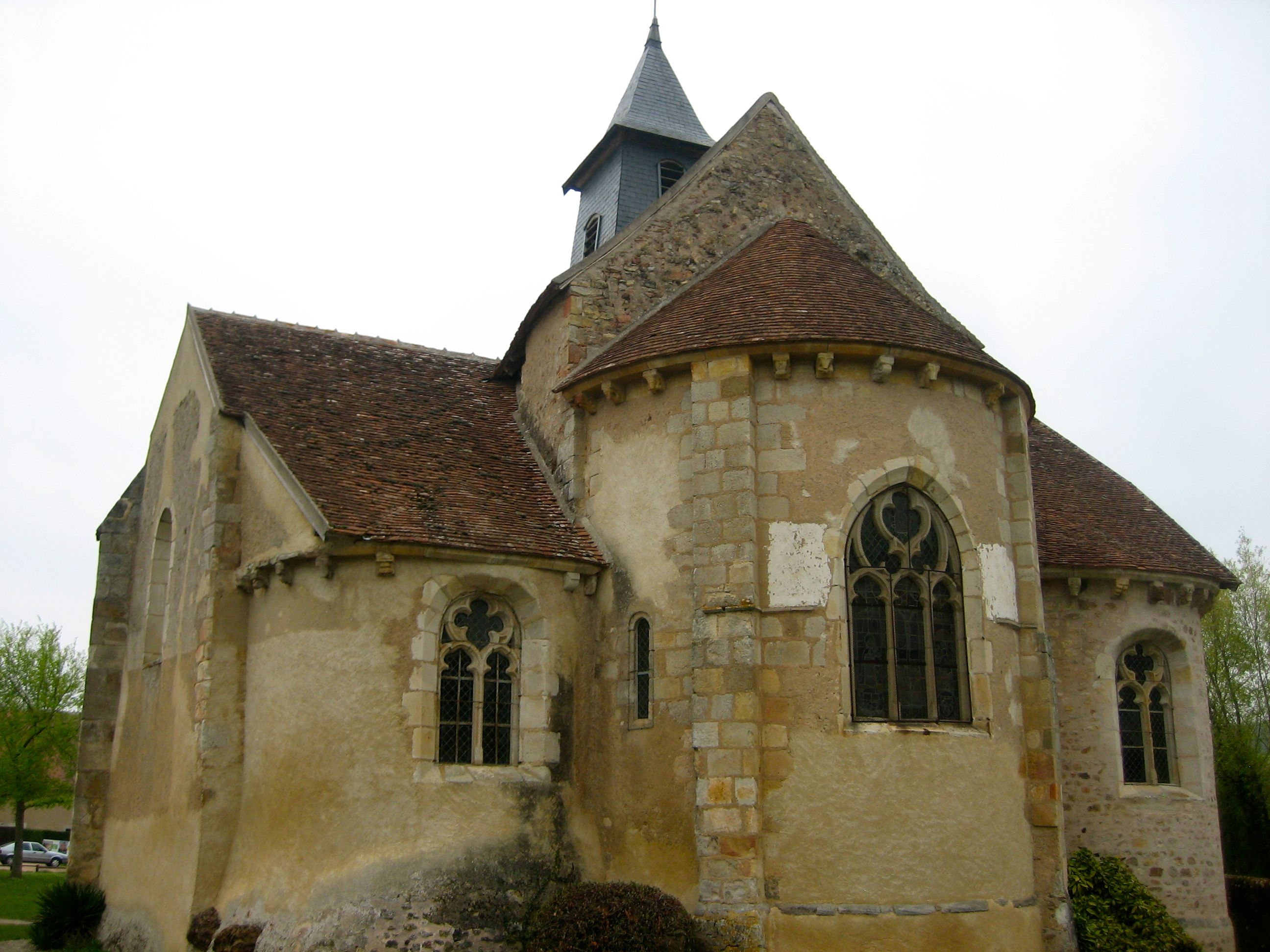
- The church of Saint-Georges, in Saint-Jeanvrin
- Location of Saint-Jeanvrin
- Location within France Location within Centre-Val de Loire
- Coordinates: 46°35′47″N 2°14′05″E
- Country: France
- Region: Centre-Val de Loire
- Department: Cher
- Arrondissement: Saint-Amand-Montrond
- Canton: Châteaumeillant

Government
  - Mayor (2020–2026): Jean-Luc Brahiti
- Area^{1}: 17.53 km^{2} (6.77 sq mi)
- Elevation: 261 m (856 ft)
- Highest elevation: 267 m (876 ft)
- Lowest elevation: 204 m (669 ft)
- Population (2023): 169
  - Density: 9.64/km^{2} (25.0/sq mi)
- Time zone: UTC+01:00 (CET)
  - Summer (DST): UTC+02:00 (CEST)
- INSEE/Postal code: 18217 /18370
- ^{1} French Land Register data, which excludes lakes, ponds, glaciers > 1 km^{2} (0.386 sq mi or 247 acres) and river estuaries.

Saint-Jeanvrin (French pronunciation: [sɛ̃ ʒɑ̃vʁɛ̃]) is a commune in the Cher department in the Centre-Val de Loire region of France.

== Geography ==
An area of lakes, streams and farming comprising the village and several hamlets situated some 32 miles (51 km) south of Bourges near the junction of the D3 with the D128 road. The commune shares its western border with the department of Indre.

== Population ==
Historical population
Year	Pop.	±% p.a.
1968	256	—
1975	210	−2.79%
1982	178	−2.33%
1990	171	−0.50%
1999	150	−1.45%
2007	158	+0.65%
2012	170	+1.47%
2017	152	−2.21%
2023	169	+1.78%
Source: INSEE

== Sights ==
- The church of St. Georges, dating from the twelfth century (Historic monument).
- The ruins of a fifteenth-century chateau.
- The Michel Langlois museum.

== See also ==
- Communes of the Cher department
