= Saint-Baudel =

- Commune
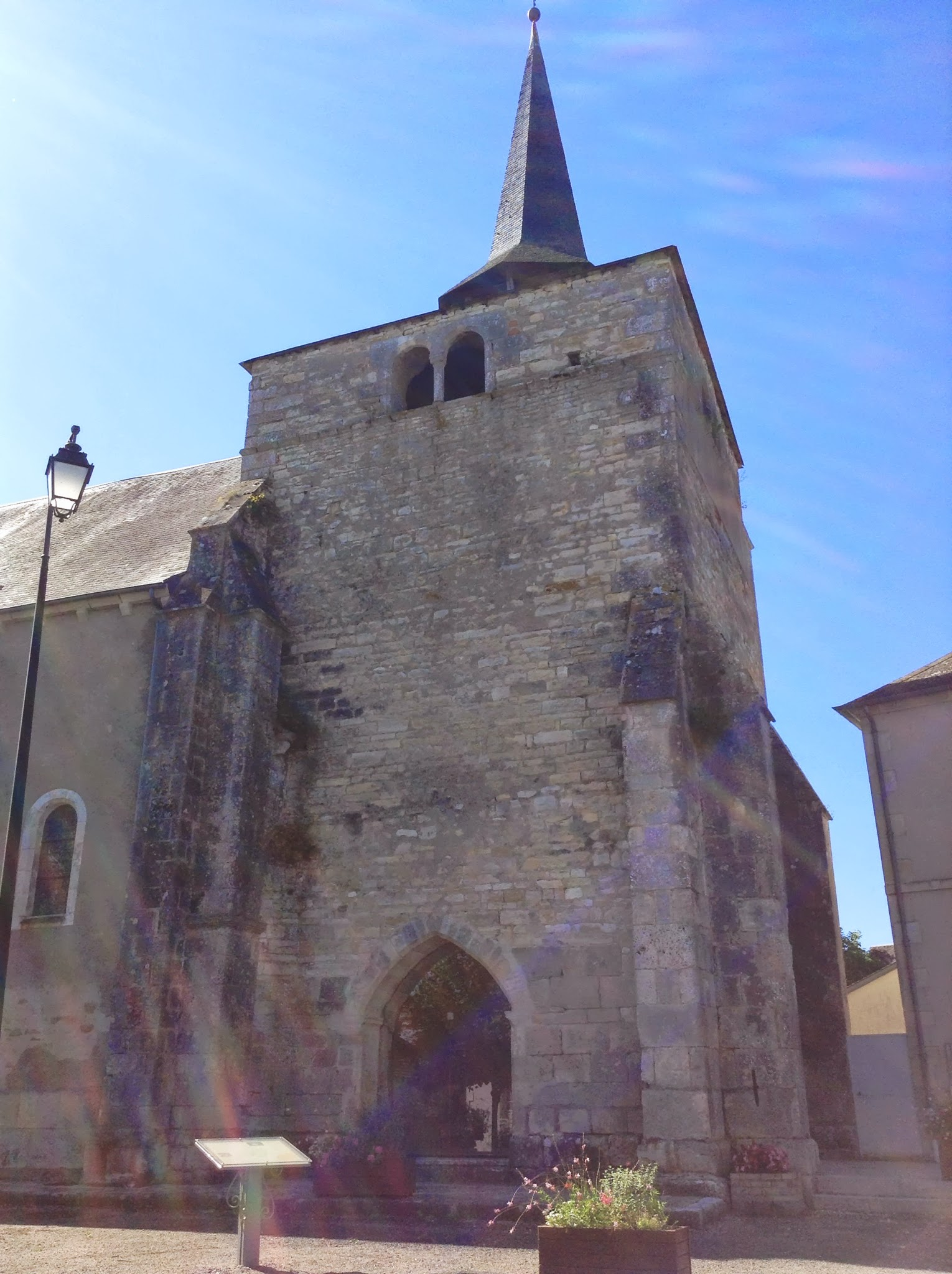
- The church in Saint-Baudel
- Location of Saint-Baudel
- Location within France Location within Centre-Val de Loire
- Coordinates: 46°50′21″N 2°12′27″E
- Country: France
- Region: Centre-Val de Loire
- Department: Cher
- Arrondissement: Saint-Amand-Montrond
- Canton: Châteaumeillant
- Intercommunality: CC Arnon Boischaut Cher

Government
  - Mayor (2020–2026): Fabienne Pinczon du Sel-Guibouret
- Area^{1}: 30.09 km^{2} (11.62 sq mi)
- Elevation: 173 m (568 ft)
- Highest elevation: 181 m (594 ft)
- Lowest elevation: 137 m (449 ft)
- Population (2023): 250
  - Density: 8.3/km^{2} (22/sq mi)
- Time zone: UTC+01:00 (CET)
  - Summer (DST): UTC+02:00 (CEST)
- INSEE/Postal code: 18199 /18200
- ^{1} French Land Register data, which excludes lakes, ponds, glaciers > 1 km^{2} (0.386 sq mi or 247 acres) and river estuaries.

Saint-Baudel (French pronunciation: [sɛ̃ bodɛl]) is a commune in the Cher department in the Centre-Val de Loire region of France.

== Geography ==
An area of farming and forestry comprising the village and several hamlets situated by the banks of the rivers Arnon and Auzon, some 23 miles (37 km) southwest of Bourges, at the junction of the D14 with the D69 and D115 roads.

== Population ==
Historical population
Year	Pop.	±% p.a.
1968	385	—
1975	347	−1.47%
1982	310	−1.60%
1990	263	−2.03%
1999	248	−0.65%
2007	291	+2.02%
2012	270	−1.49%
2017	250	−1.53%
2023	250	+0.00%
Source: INSEE

== Sights ==
- The church of St. Baudel, dating from the thirteenth century.
- A watermill.

== See also ==
- Communes of the Cher department
