= Canton of Châteaumeillant =

Coordinates: 46°33′46″N 2°12′5″E

Châteaumeillant
- Canton
- Interactive map of Châteaumeillant
- Country: France
- Region: Centre-Val de Loire
- Department: Cher
- No. of communes: {{{nbcomm}}}
- Area: 1,008.37 km^{2} (389.33 sq mi)
- Population (2023): 14,095
  - Density: 13.978/km^{2} (36.203/sq mi)
- INSEE code: 18 08

The Canton of Châteaumeillant is a canton situated in the Cher département and in the Centre-Val de Loire region of France.

== Geography ==
A farming area in the southern part of the arrondissement of Saint-Amand-Montrond centred on the town of Châteaumeillant.

== Composition ==
At the French canton reorganisation which came into effect in March 2015, the canton was expanded from 11 to 38 communes:

- Ainay-le-Vieil
- Arcomps
- Ardenais
- Beddes
- La Celle-Condé
- La Celette
- Châteaumeillant
- Le Châtelet
- Chezal-Benoît
- Culan
- Épineuil-le-Fleuriel
- Faverdines
- Ids-Saint-Roch
- Ineuil
- Lignières
- Loye-sur-Arnon
- Maisonnais
- Montlouis
- Morlac
- La Perche
- Préveranges
- Reigny
- Rezay
- Saint-Baudel
- Saint-Christophe-le-Chaudry
- Saint-Georges-de-Poisieux
- Saint-Hilaire-en-Lignières
- Saint-Jeanvrin
- Saint-Maur
- Saint-Pierre-les-Bois
- Saint-Priest-la-Marche
- Saint-Saturnin
- Saint-Vitte
- Saulzais-le-Potier
- Sidiailles
- Touchay
- Vesdun
- Villecelin

== Population ==
Historical population
Year	Pop.	±% p.a.
2013	15,403	—
2018	14,554	−1.13%
Source: INSEE

== See also ==
- Arrondissements of the Cher department
- Cantons of the Cher department
- Communes of the Cher department
