= La Celette =

- Commune
- Location of La Celette
- Location within France Location within Centre-Val de Loire
- Coordinates: 46°39′08″N 2°31′19″E
- Country: France
- Region: Centre-Val de Loire
- Department: Cher
- Arrondissement: Saint-Amand-Montrond
- Canton: Châteaumeillant

Government
  - Mayor (2020–2026): Phililpe Chateau
- Area^{1}: 24.81 km^{2} (9.58 sq mi)
- Elevation: 180 m (590 ft)
- Highest elevation: 231 m (758 ft)
- Lowest elevation: 165 m (541 ft)
- Population (2023): 205
  - Density: 8.26/km^{2} (21.4/sq mi)
- Time zone: UTC+01:00 (CET)
  - Summer (DST): UTC+02:00 (CEST)
- INSEE/Postal code: 18041 /18360
- ^{1} French Land Register data, which excludes lakes, ponds, glaciers > 1 km^{2} (0.386 sq mi or 247 acres) and river estuaries.

La Celette (French pronunciation: [la səlɛt]) is a commune in the Cher department in the Centre-Val de Loire region of France.

== Geography ==
A farming area comprising the village and two hamlets situated some 32 miles (51 km) south of Bourges at the junction of the D1 and the D97 roads. The A71 autoroute runs through the southwestern part of the territory of the commune.

== Population ==
Historical population
Year	Pop.	±% p.a.
1968	305	—
1975	221	−4.50%
1982	200	−1.42%
1990	180	−1.31%
1999	181	+0.06%
2007	206	+1.63%
2012	179	−2.77%
2017	181	+0.22%
2023	205	+2.10%
Source: INSEE

== Sights ==
- The church of Saints Peter and Paul, rebuilt in the nineteenth century.

== See also ==
- Communes of the Cher department
