= Reigny =

- Commune
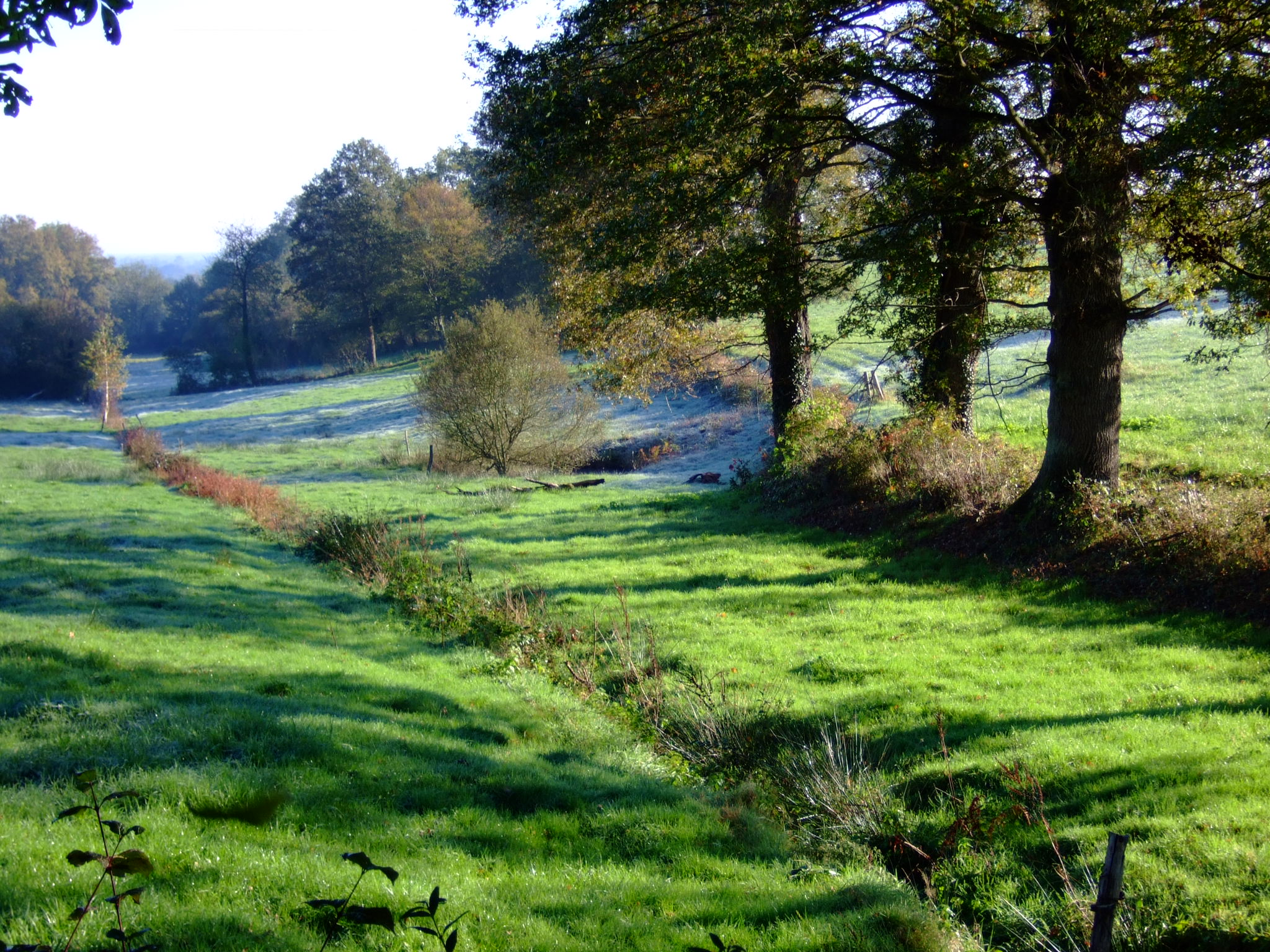
- The rural landscape of Boischaut south of Reigny, near to the hamlet of Maugenest
- Location of Reigny
- Location within France Location within Centre-Val de Loire
- Coordinates: 46°34′38″N 2°21′12″E
- Country: France
- Region: Centre-Val de Loire
- Department: Cher
- Arrondissement: Saint-Amand-Montrond
- Canton: Châteaumeillant

Government
  - Mayor (2020–2026): Bruno Chagnon
- Area^{1}: 24.61 km^{2} (9.50 sq mi)
- Elevation: 405 m (1,329 ft)
- Highest elevation: 303 m (994 ft)
- Lowest elevation: 202 m (663 ft)
- Population (2023): 234
  - Density: 9.51/km^{2} (24.6/sq mi)
- Time zone: UTC+01:00 (CET)
  - Summer (DST): UTC+02:00 (CEST)
- INSEE/Postal code: 18192 /18270
- ^{1} French Land Register data, which excludes lakes, ponds, glaciers > 1 km^{2} (0.386 sq mi or 247 acres) and river estuaries.

Reigny (French pronunciation: [ʁɛɲi]) is a commune in the Cher department in the Centre-Val de Loire region of France.

== Geography ==
A farming area comprising the village and a few hamlets situated on the banks of the river Arnon, some 38 miles (61 km) south of Bourges, at the junction of the D38 with the D62 and D997 roads.

== Population ==
Historical population
Year	Pop.	±% p.a.
1968	443	—
1975	400	−1.45%
1982	317	−3.27%
1990	276	−1.72%
1999	266	−0.41%
2007	270	+0.19%
2012	257	−0.98%
2017	256	−0.08%
2023	234	−1.49%
Source: INSEE

== See also ==
- Communes of the Cher department
