= Beddes =

- Commune
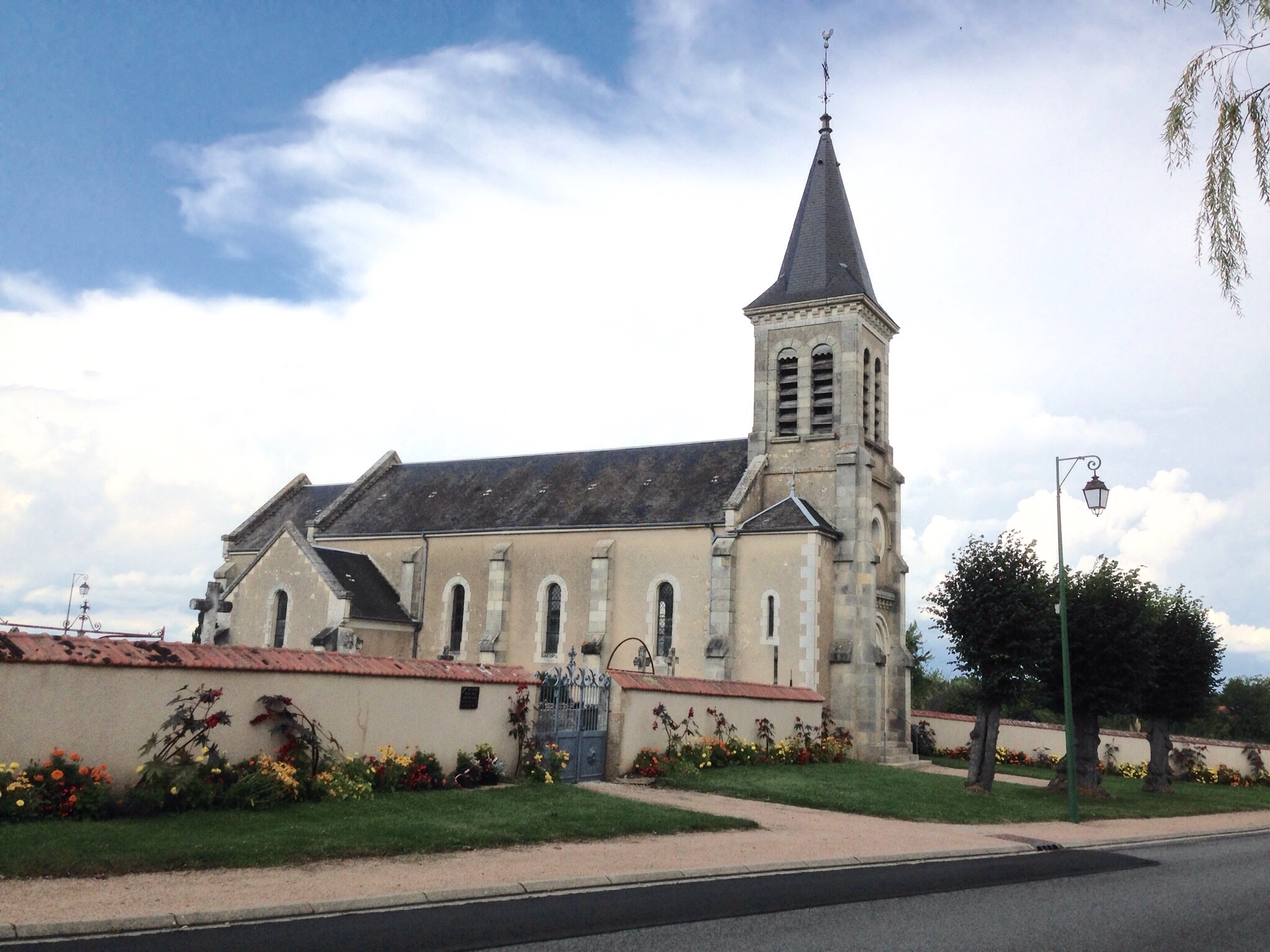
- The church in Beddes
- Location of Beddes
- Location within France Location within Centre-Val de Loire
- Coordinates: 46°36′23″N 2°12′50″E
- Country: France
- Region: Centre-Val de Loire
- Department: Cher
- Arrondissement: Saint-Amand-Montrond
- Canton: Châteaumeillant

Government
  - Mayor (2020–2026): Fabrice Aupetit
- Area^{1}: 12.92 km^{2} (4.99 sq mi)
- Elevation: 230 m (750 ft)
- Highest elevation: 257 m (843 ft)
- Lowest elevation: 192 m (630 ft)
- Population (2023): 105
  - Density: 8.13/km^{2} (21.0/sq mi)
- Time zone: UTC+01:00 (CET)
  - Summer (DST): UTC+02:00 (CEST)
- INSEE/Postal code: 18024 /18370
- ^{1} French Land Register data, which excludes lakes, ponds, glaciers > 1 km^{2} (0.386 sq mi or 247 acres) and river estuaries.

Beddes (French pronunciation: [bɛd]) is a commune in the Cher department in the Centre-Val de Loire region of France, by the banks of the Charasse stream, about 38 miles (61 km) south of Bourges. The commune shares a border with the department of Indre.

== Population ==
Historical population
Year	Pop.	±% p.a.
1968	152	—
1975	136	−1.58%
1982	125	−1.20%
1990	111	−1.47%
1999	94	−1.83%
2007	96	+0.26%
2012	89	−1.50%
2017	93	+0.88%
2023	105	+2.04%
Source: INSEE

== See also ==
- Communes of the Cher department
