= Le Chautay =

- Commune
- Location of Le Chautay
- Location within France Location within Centre-Val de Loire
- Coordinates: 46°58′39″N 2°58′02″E
- Country: France
- Region: Centre-Val de Loire
- Department: Cher
- Arrondissement: Saint-Amand-Montrond
- Canton: La Guerche-sur-l'Aubois

Government
  - Mayor (2022–2026): Chantal Bernard
- Area^{1}: 14.74 km^{2} (5.69 sq mi)
- Elevation: 185 m (607 ft)
- Highest elevation: 213 m (699 ft)
- Lowest elevation: 172 m (564 ft)
- Population (2023): 256
  - Density: 17.4/km^{2} (45.0/sq mi)
- Time zone: UTC+01:00 (CET)
  - Summer (DST): UTC+02:00 (CEST)
- INSEE/Postal code: 18062 /18150
- ^{1} French Land Register data, which excludes lakes, ponds, glaciers > 1 km^{2} (0.386 sq mi or 247 acres) and river estuaries.

Le Chautay (French pronunciation: [lə ʃotɛ]) is a commune in the Cher department in the Centre-Val de Loire region of France.

== Geography ==
An area of lakes, forestry and farming comprising a small village and a couple of hamlets situated by the banks of both the canal de Berry and the river Aubois, some 15 miles (24 km) southeast of Bourges, at the junction of the D50 and the D920 roads.

== Population ==
Historical population
Year	Pop.	±% p.a.
1968	310	—
1975	301	−0.42%
1982	317	+0.74%
1990	278	−1.63%
1999	317	+1.47%
2007	271	−1.94%
2012	271	+0.00%
2017	293	+1.57%
2023	256	−2.22%
Source: INSEE

== Sights ==
- The church of St. Saturnin, dating from the twelfth century.
- A fifteenth-century manorhouse.
- A watermill.

== See also ==
- Communes of the Cher department
