= Saulzais-le-Potier =

- Commune
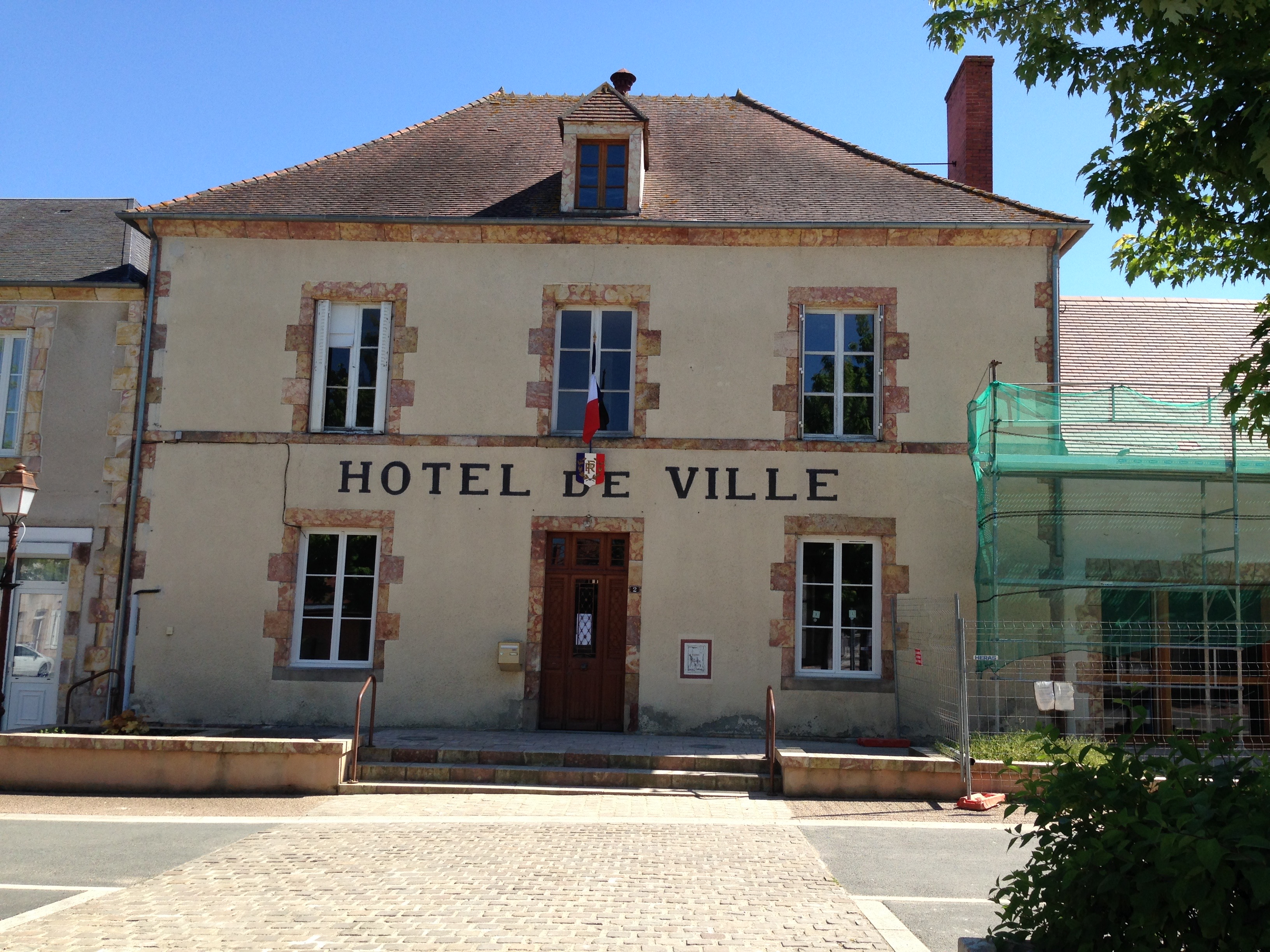
- Town hall

- Coat of arms
- Location of Saulzais-le-Potier
- Location within France Location within Centre-Val de Loire
- Coordinates: 46°35′59″N 2°29′48″E
- Country: France
- Region: Centre-Val de Loire
- Department: Cher
- Arrondissement: Saint-Amand-Montrond
- Canton: Châteaumeillant

Government
  - Mayor (2020–2026): Gérard Cardonel
- Area^{1}: 32.38 km^{2} (12.50 sq mi)
- Elevation: 227 m (745 ft)
- Highest elevation: 251 m (823 ft)
- Lowest elevation: 189 m (620 ft)
- Population (2023): 472
  - Density: 14.6/km^{2} (37.8/sq mi)
- Time zone: UTC+01:00 (CET)
  - Summer (DST): UTC+02:00 (CEST)
- INSEE/Postal code: 18245 /18360
- ^{1} French Land Register data, which excludes lakes, ponds, glaciers > 1 km^{2} (0.386 sq mi or 247 acres) and river estuaries.

Saulzais-le-Potier (French pronunciation: [solzɛ lə pɔtje]; Occitan: Sauçai) is a commune in the Cher department in the Centre-Val de Loire region of France.

== Geography ==
An area of lakes and streams, farming and forestry, comprising a village and several hamlets situated by the banks of the river Loubiere, about 53 km (33 mi) south of Bourges, at the junction of the D64 with the D140 and D67 roads. The A71 autoroute runs through the middle of the commune’s territory. Saulzais-le-Potier was the seat of the canton of Saulzais-le-Potier, until it was disbanded in 2015.

== Population ==
Historical population
Year	Pop.	±% p.a.
1968	621	—
1975	513	−2.69%
1982	476	−1.06%
1990	473	−0.08%
1999	492	+0.44%
2007	531	+0.96%
2012	514	−0.65%
2017	497	−0.67%
2023	472	−0.86%
Source: INSEE

== Sights ==
- The church, rebuilt in the nineteenth century.
- The eighteenth-century chateau of Mazière.
- The chateau of Champmatouin.
- The eighteenth-century chateau of La Lande and its park.

== See also ==
- Communes of the Cher department
