= Jouet-sur-l'Aubois =

Jouet-sur-l’Aubois
- Commune
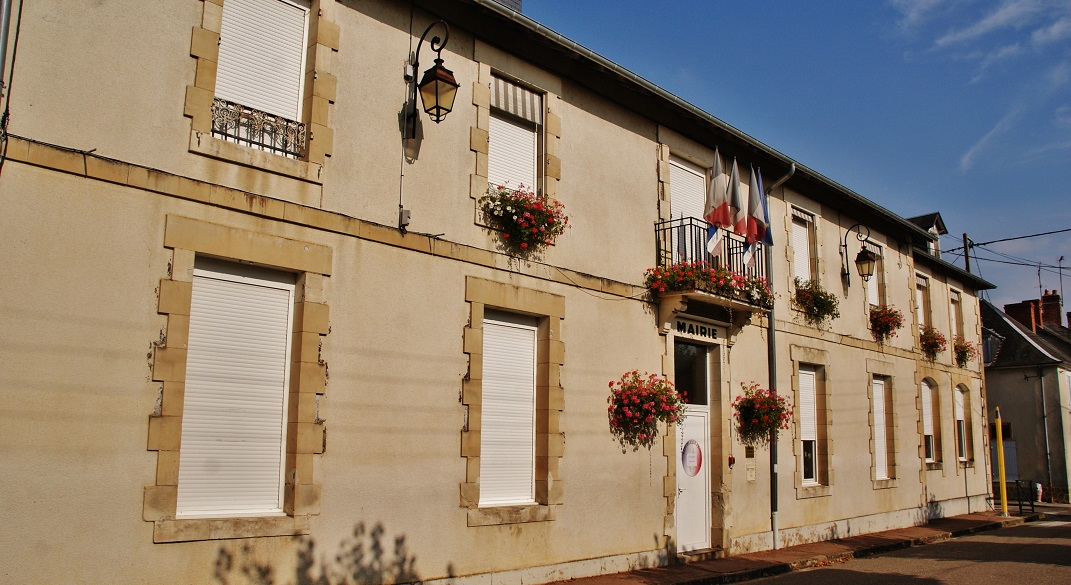
- The town hall in Jouet-sur-l'Aubois
- Location of Jouet-sur-l’Aubois
- Location within France Location within Centre-Val de Loire
- Coordinates: 47°02′46″N 2°59′21″E
- Country: France
- Region: Centre-Val de Loire
- Department: Cher
- Arrondissement: Saint-Amand-Montrond
- Canton: La Guerche-sur-l'Aubois
- Intercommunality: Portes du Berry entre Loire et Val d'Aubois

Government
  - Mayor (2020–2026): Serge Laurent
- Area^{1}: 17.33 km^{2} (6.69 sq mi)
- Elevation: 180 m (590 ft)
- Highest elevation: 207 m (679 ft)
- Lowest elevation: 160 m (520 ft)
- Population (2023): 1,303
  - Density: 75.19/km^{2} (194.7/sq mi)
- Time zone: UTC+01:00 (CET)
  - Summer (DST): UTC+02:00 (CEST)
- INSEE/Postal code: 18118 /18320
- ^{1} French Land Register data, which excludes lakes, ponds, glaciers > 1 km^{2} (0.386 sq mi or 247 acres) and river estuaries.

Jouet-sur-l’Aubois (French pronunciation: [ʒwɛ syʁ lobwa]) is a commune in the Cher department in the Centre-Val de Loire region of France.

== Geography ==
An area of forestry and farming comprising the village and a few hamlets situated by the banks of the rivers Aubois, Loire and the Loire lateral canal, some 22 miles (35 km) east of Bourges at the junction of the D12, D26 and the D920 roads.

== Population ==
Historical population
Year	Pop.	±% p.a.
1968	1,551	—
1975	1,616	+0.59%
1982	1,488	−1.17%
1990	1,395	−0.80%
1999	1,341	−0.44%
2007	1,511	+1.50%
2012	1,461	−0.67%
2017	1,348	−1.60%
2023	1,303	−0.56%
Source: INSEE

== Sights ==
- The church of St. Germain, dating from the nineteenth century.
- The remains of a 12th-century chapel.
- A medieval motte.
- Some Gallo-Roman remains.
- An old disused factory and forge.

== See also ==
- Communes of the Cher department
