= Saint-Vitte =

- Commune
- Location of Saint-Vitte
- Location within France Location within Centre-Val de Loire
- Coordinates: 46°32′52″N 2°32′06″E
- Country: France
- Region: Centre-Val de Loire
- Department: Cher
- Arrondissement: Saint-Amand-Montrond
- Canton: Châteaumeillant

Government
  - Mayor (2020–2026): Guy Berçon
- Area^{1}: 16.38 km^{2} (6.32 sq mi)
- Elevation: 322 m (1,056 ft)
- Highest elevation: 277 m (909 ft)
- Lowest elevation: 184 m (604 ft)
- Population (2023): 117
  - Density: 7.14/km^{2} (18.5/sq mi)
- Time zone: UTC+01:00 (CET)
  - Summer (DST): UTC+02:00 (CEST)
- INSEE/Postal code: 18238 /18360
- ^{1} French Land Register data, which excludes lakes, ponds, glaciers > 1 km^{2} (0.386 sq mi or 247 acres) and river estuaries.

Saint-Vitte (French pronunciation: [sɛ̃ vit]) is a commune in the Cher department in the Centre-Val de Loire region of France.

== Geography ==
A small farming area comprising the village and two hamlets situated in the valley of the small river Queugne, about 36 miles (58 km) south of Bourges at the junction of the D4 with the D4e and D173 roads. The commune borders the department of Allier and the A71 autoroute passes through the eastern part of the commune. The small river Boeuf forms most of the commune’s northern border

== Population ==
Historical population
Year	Pop.	±% p.a.
1968	244	—
1975	202	−2.66%
1982	176	−1.95%
1990	138	−2.99%
1999	136	−0.16%
2007	138	+0.18%
2012	133	−0.74%
2017	131	−0.30%
2023	117	−1.87%
Source: INSEE

== Sights ==
- The church of St. Vitte, dating from the sixteenth century.

== See also ==
- Communes of the Cher department
