= Sidiailles =

- Commune
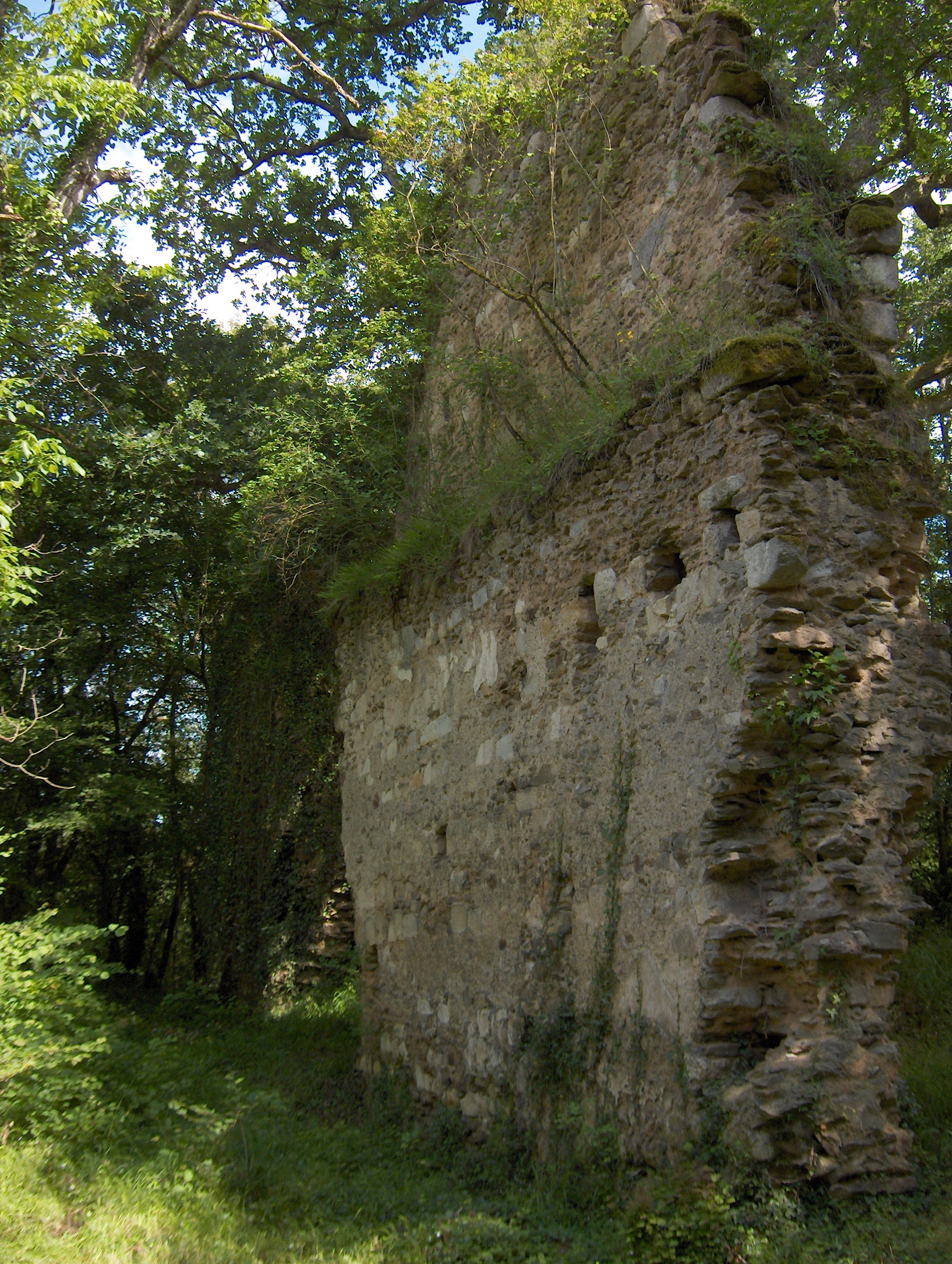
- Ruins of the abbey
- Location of Sidiailles
- Location within France Location within Centre-Val de Loire
- Coordinates: 46°30′29″N 2°19′11″E
- Country: France
- Region: Centre-Val de Loire
- Department: Cher
- Arrondissement: Saint-Amand-Montrond
- Canton: Châteaumeillant

Government
  - Mayor (2020–2026): Florence Lerude
- Area^{1}: 31.96 km^{2} (12.34 sq mi)
- Elevation: 350 m (1,150 ft)
- Highest elevation: 366 m (1,201 ft)
- Lowest elevation: 233 m (764 ft)
- Population (2023): 294
  - Density: 9.20/km^{2} (23.8/sq mi)
- Time zone: UTC+01:00 (CET)
  - Summer (DST): UTC+02:00 (CEST)
- INSEE/Postal code: 18252 /18270
- ^{1} French Land Register data, which excludes lakes, ponds, glaciers > 1 km^{2} (0.386 sq mi or 247 acres) and river estuaries.

Sidiailles (French pronunciation: [sidjaj]) is a commune in the Cher department in the Centre-Val de Loire region of France.

== Geography ==
An area of farming and forestry comprising the village and several hamlets situated at the confluence of the rivers Arnon and Joyeuse, about 13 miles (21 km) south of Bourges at the junction of the D997 with the D111 and D237 roads.

== Population ==
Historical population
Year	Pop.	±% p.a.
1968	584	—
1975	563	−0.52%
1982	467	−2.64%
1990	375	−2.71%
1999	331	−1.38%
2007	313	−0.70%
2012	310	−0.19%
2017	303	−0.46%
2023	294	−0.50%
Source: INSEE

== Sights ==
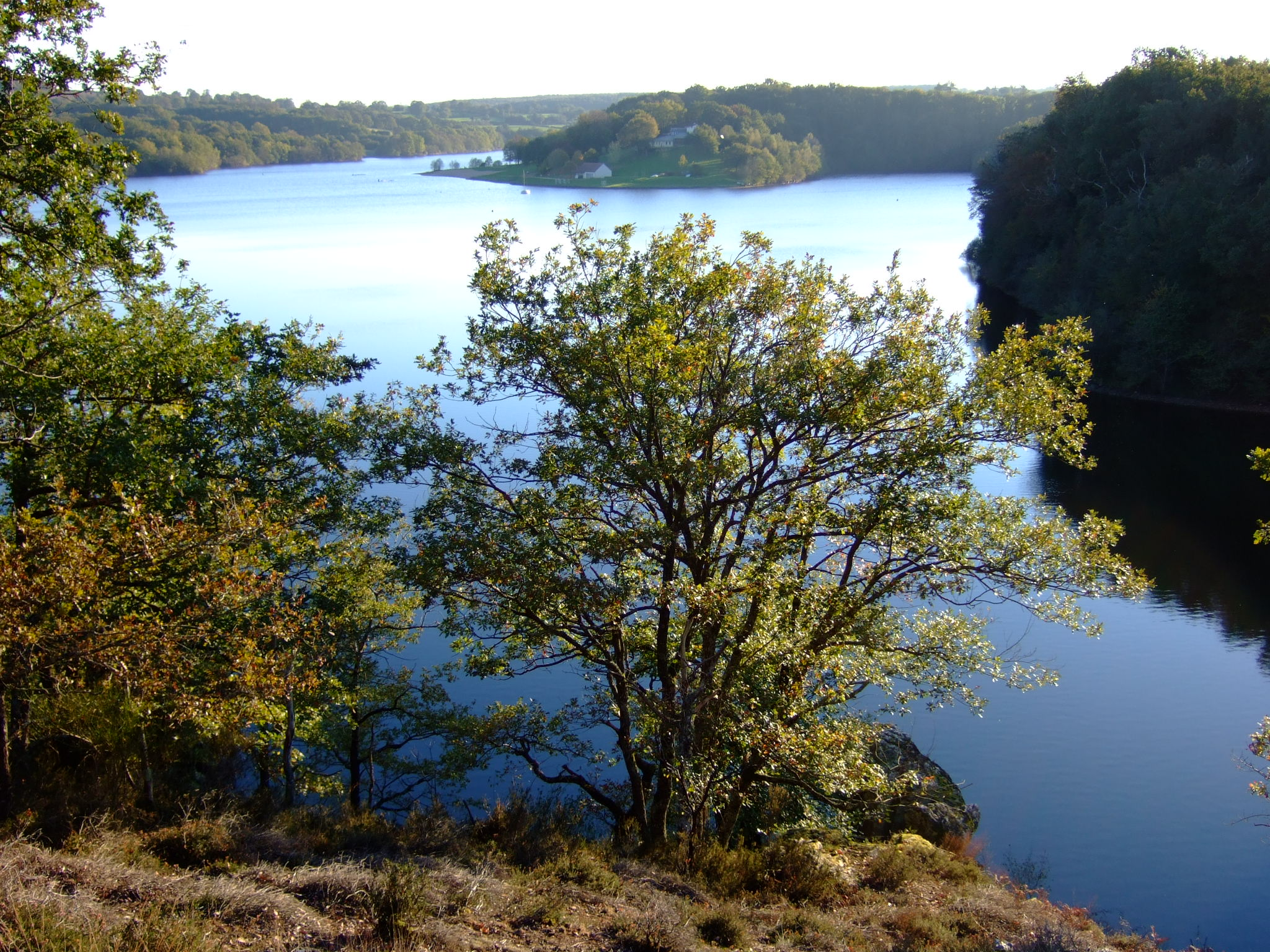
The lake at Sidiailles

- The ruins of a twelfth-century abbey.
- The church of St. Pierre and St. Paul, dating from the twelfth century, with a bell cast in 1235.
- A large reservoir.

== See also ==
- Communes of the Cher department
