= Ineuil =

- Commune
- Location of Ineuil
- Location within France Location within Centre-Val de Loire
- Coordinates: 46°46′39″N 2°17′24″E
- Country: France
- Region: Centre-Val de Loire
- Department: Cher
- Arrondissement: Saint-Amand-Montrond
- Canton: Châteaumeillant

Government
  - Mayor (2020–2026): Patrick Bisson
- Area^{1}: 27.48 km^{2} (10.61 sq mi)
- Elevation: 168 m (551 ft)
- Highest elevation: 188 m (617 ft)
- Lowest elevation: 158 m (518 ft)
- Population (2023): 207
  - Density: 7.53/km^{2} (19.5/sq mi)
- Time zone: UTC+01:00 (CET)
  - Summer (DST): UTC+02:00 (CEST)
- INSEE/Postal code: 18114 /18160
- ^{1} French Land Register data, which excludes lakes, ponds, glaciers > 1 km^{2} (0.386 sq mi or 247 acres) and river estuaries.

Ineuil (French pronunciation: [inœj]) is a commune in the Cher department in the Centre-Val de Loire region of France.

== Geography ==
A farming area comprising the village and several hamlets situated by the banks of the small river of the Lac de la Lecherie, some 22 miles (35 km) south of Bourges at the junction of the D144 and the D192 roads.

== Population ==
Historical population
Year	Pop.	±% p.a.
1968	346	—
1975	273	−3.33%
1982	269	−0.21%
1990	240	−1.42%
1999	248	+0.36%
2007	250	+0.10%
2012	238	−0.98%
2017	238	+0.00%
2023	207	−2.30%
Source: INSEE

== Sights ==
- The church of St. Martin, dating from the twelfth century.
- The fifteenth-century chateau of Villiers.
- The motte of a feudal castle.

== See also ==
- Communes of the Cher department
