= Saint-Christophe-le-Chaudry =

- Commune
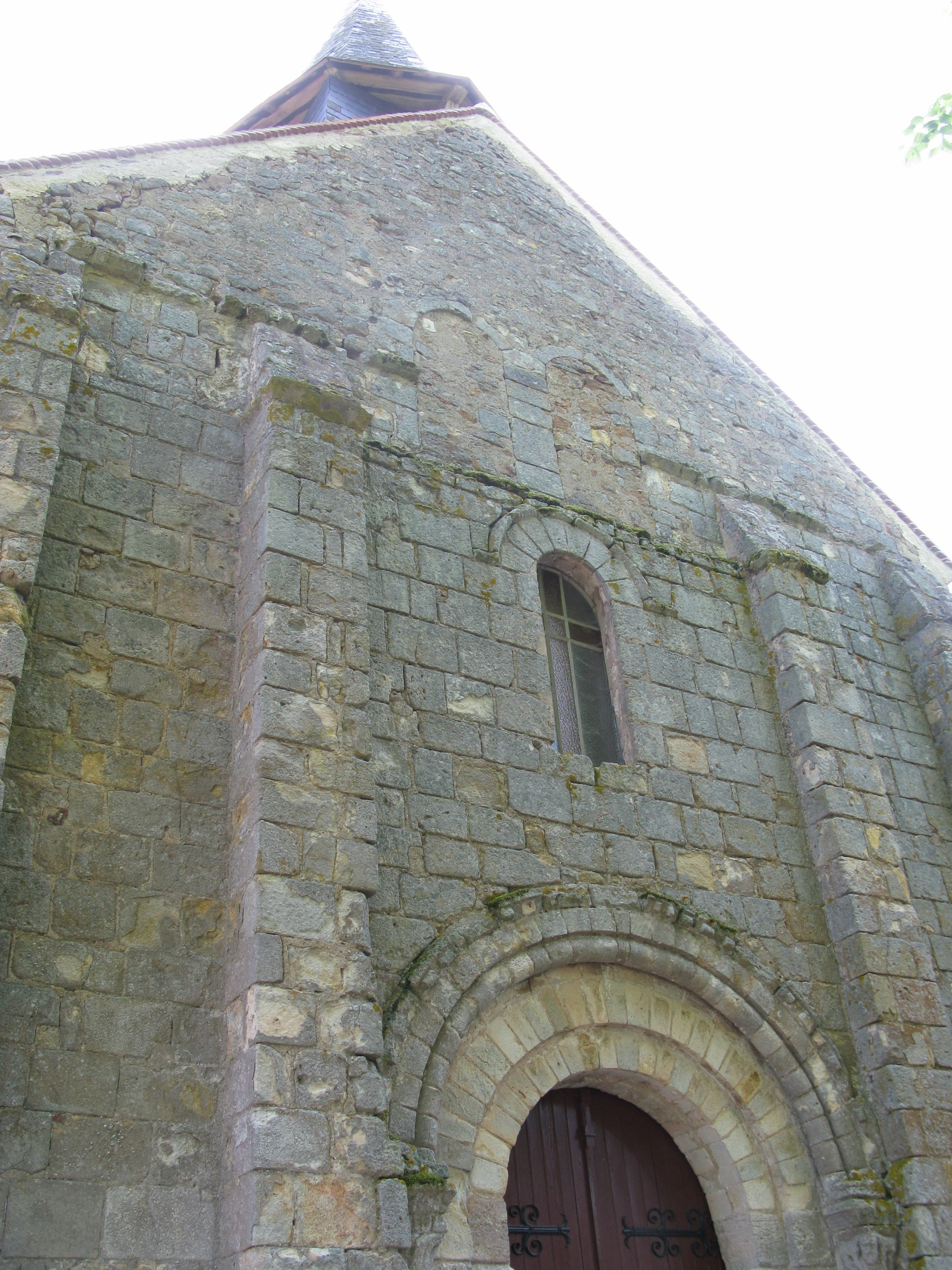
- The church in Saint-Christophe-le-Chaudry
- Location of Saint-Christophe-le-Chaudry
- Location within France Location within Centre-Val de Loire
- Coordinates: 46°34′57″N 2°22′11″E
- Country: France
- Region: Centre-Val de Loire
- Department: Cher
- Arrondissement: Saint-Amand-Montrond
- Canton: Châteaumeillant

Government
  - Mayor (2020–2026): Jean-Pierre Amizet
- Area^{1}: 17.52 km^{2} (6.76 sq mi)
- Elevation: 220 m (720 ft)
- Highest elevation: 317 m (1,040 ft)
- Lowest elevation: 202 m (663 ft)
- Population (2023): 95
  - Density: 5.4/km^{2} (14/sq mi)
- Time zone: UTC+01:00 (CET)
  - Summer (DST): UTC+02:00 (CEST)
- INSEE/Postal code: 18203 /18270
- ^{1} French Land Register data, which excludes lakes, ponds, glaciers > 1 km^{2} (0.386 sq mi or 247 acres) and river estuaries.

Saint-Christophe-le-Chaudry (French pronunciation: [sɛ̃ kʁistɔf lə ʃodʁi], Occitan: Sent Cristòu de Chaudri) is a commune in the Cher department in the Centre-Val de Loire region of France.

== Geography ==
An area of lakes, streams and farming comprising a small village and a couple of hamlets situated on the banks of the river Arnon, about 55 km (34 mi) south of Bourges at the junction of the D997 and the D62 roads.

== Population ==
Auvergnat and Limousin dialect are also spoken in commune which is claimed was a northernmost endangered Occitan language speaking area.

Historical population
Year	Pop.	±% p.a.
1968	210	—
1975	171	−2.89%
1982	123	−4.60%
1990	120	−0.31%
1999	133	+1.15%
2007	118	−1.48%
2012	96	−4.04%
2017	104	+1.61%
2023	95	−1.50%
Source: INSEE

== Sights ==
- The church of St. Christophe, dating from the twelfth century.
- The fifteenth-century chateau of La Forêt-Grailly.
- The medieval manorhouse de La Lande-Chevrier
- The abbey de La Mothe.
- A watermill.
- Evidence of Roman occupation.

== See also ==
- Communes of the Cher department
