= Torteron =

- Commune
- Location of Torteron
- Location within France Location within Centre-Val de Loire
- Coordinates: 47°01′24″N 2°58′01″E
- Country: France
- Region: Centre-Val de Loire
- Department: Cher
- Arrondissement: Saint-Amand-Montrond
- Canton: La Guerche-sur-l'Aubois

Government
  - Mayor (2020–2026): Michel Sauvagnat
- Area^{1}: 13.53 km^{2} (5.22 sq mi)
- Elevation: 210 m (690 ft)
- Highest elevation: 208 m (682 ft)
- Lowest elevation: 167 m (548 ft)
- Population (2023): 785
  - Density: 58.0/km^{2} (150/sq mi)
- Time zone: UTC+01:00 (CET)
  - Summer (DST): UTC+02:00 (CEST)
- INSEE/Postal code: 18265 /244713
- ^{1} French Land Register data, which excludes lakes, ponds, glaciers > 1 km^{2} (0.386 sq mi or 247 acres) and river estuaries.

Torteron (French pronunciation: [tɔʁtəʁɔ̃]) is a commune in the Cher department in the Centre-Val de Loire region of France.

== Geography ==
An area of forestry and farming comprising the village and several hamlets situated on the banks of both the canal de Berry and the river Aubois, about 21 miles (34 km) east of Bourges at the junction of the D50 with the D26 road.

== Population ==
Historical population
Year	Pop.	±% p.a.
1968	869	—
1975	871	+0.03%
1982	826	−0.75%
1990	793	−0.51%
1999	738	−0.80%
2007	811	+1.19%
2012	823	+0.29%
2017	795	−0.69%
2023	785	−0.21%
Source: INSEE

== Sights ==
- The church of St. Pierre and St. Paul, dating from the nineteenth century.
- Some Roman remains.
- The fifteenth-century manorhouse at Milly.
- The seventeenth-century manorhouse at Bertin.

== See also ==
- Communes of the Cher department
