= Arrondissement of Saint-Amand-Montrond =

Coordinates: 46.72°N 2.50°E

Saint-Amand-Montrond
- Arrondissement
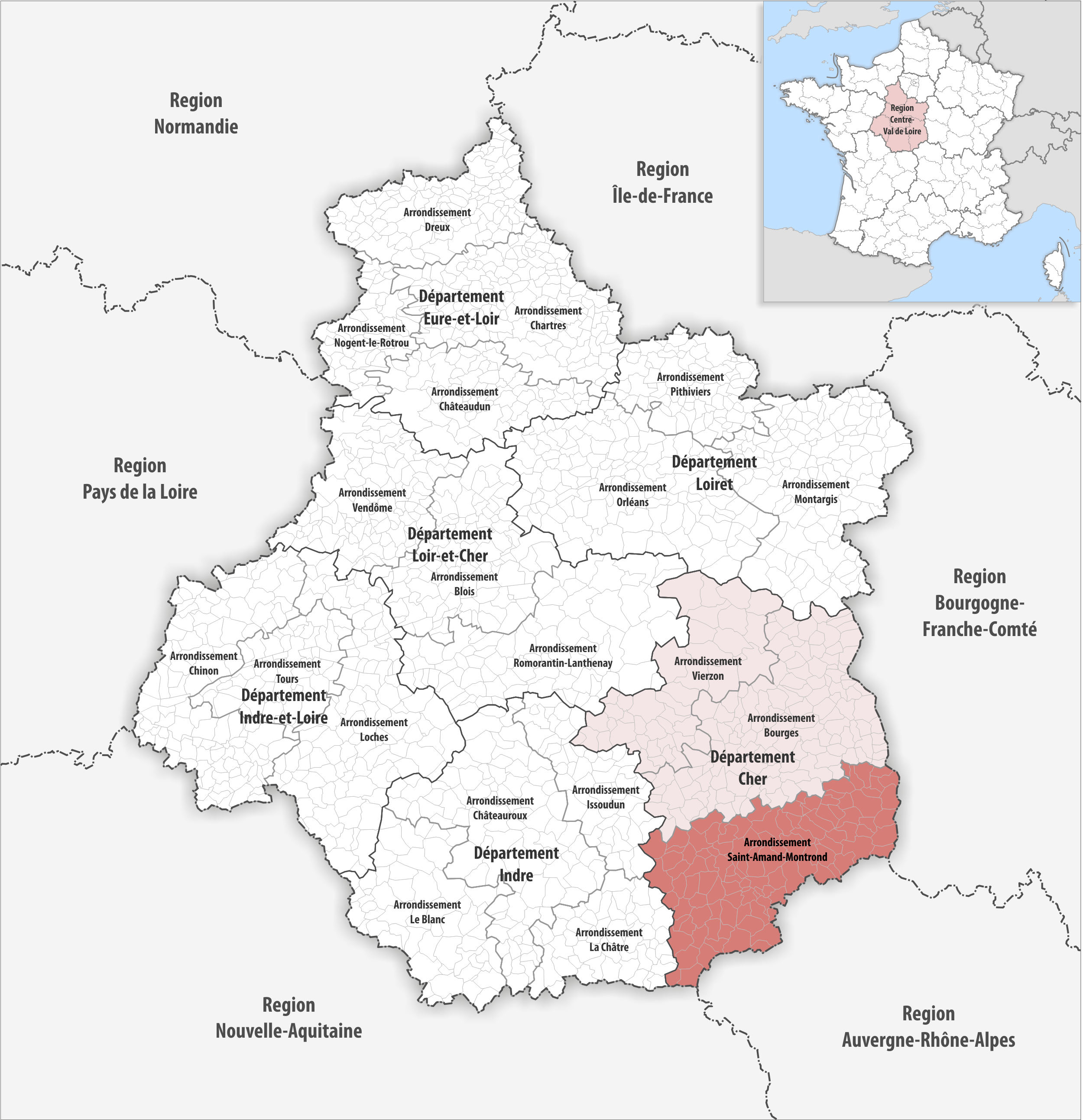
- Location within the region Centre-Val de Loire
- Country: France
- Region: Centre-Val de Loire
- Department: Cher
- No. of communes: {{{nbcomm}}}
- Area: 2,683.7 km^{2} (1,036.2 sq mi)
- Population (2023): 60,842
  - Density: 22.671/km^{2} (58.717/sq mi)
- INSEE code: 182

The arrondissement of Saint-Amand-Montrond is an arrondissement of France in the Cher department in the Centre-Val de Loire region. It has 115 communes. Its population is 61,114 (2021), and its area is 2,683.7 km^{2} (1,036.2 sq mi).

== Composition ==
The communes of the arrondissement of Saint-Amand-Montrond, and their INSEE codes, are:

1. Ainay-le-Vieil (18002)
2. Apremont-sur-Allier (18007)
3. Arcomps (18009)
4. Ardenais (18010)
5. Arpheuilles (18013)
6. Augy-sur-Aubois (18017)
7. Bannegon (18021)
8. Beddes (18024)
9. Bessais-le-Fromental (18029)
10. Blet (18031)
11. Bouzais (18034)
12. Bruère-Allichamps (18038)
13. Bussy (18040)
14. La Celette (18041)
15. La Celle (18042)
16. La Celle-Condé (18043)
17. Chalivoy-Milon (18045)
18. Chambon (18046)
19. La Chapelle-Hugon (18048)
20. Charenton-du-Cher (18052)
21. Charly (18054)
22. Châteaumeillant (18057)
23. Châteauneuf-sur-Cher (18058)
24. Le Châtelet (18059)
25. Chaumont (18060)
26. Le Chautay (18062)
27. Chavannes (18063)
28. Chezal-Benoît (18065)
29. Cogny (18068)
30. Colombiers (18069)
31. Contres (18071)
32. Cornusse (18072)
33. Corquoy (18073)
34. Cours-les-Barres (18075)
35. Coust (18076)
36. Crézançay-sur-Cher (18078)
37. Croisy (18080)
38. Cuffy (18082)
39. Culan (18083)
40. Drevant (18086)
41. Dun-sur-Auron (18087)
42. Épineuil-le-Fleuriel (18089)
43. Farges-Allichamps (18091)
44. Faverdines (18093)
45. Flavigny (18095)
46. Germigny-l'Exempt (18101)
47. Givardon (18102)
48. Grossouvre (18106)
49. La Groutte (18107)
50. La Guerche-sur-l'Aubois (18108)
51. Ids-Saint-Roch (18112)
52. Ignol (18113)
53. Ineuil (18114)
54. Jouet-sur-l'Aubois (18118)
55. Lantan (18121)
56. Lignières (18127)
57. Loye-sur-Arnon (18130)
58. Maisonnais (18135)
59. Marçais (18136)
60. Meillant (18142)
61. Menetou-Couture (18143)
62. Montlouis (18152)
63. Morlac (18153)
64. Mornay-Berry (18154)
65. Mornay-sur-Allier (18155)
66. Nérondes (18160)
67. Neuilly-en-Dun (18161)
68. Neuvy-le-Barrois (18164)
69. Nozières, Cher (18169)
70. Orcenais (18171)
71. Orval (18172)
72. Osmery (18173)
73. Ourouer-les-Bourdelins (18175)
74. Parnay (18177)
75. La Perche (18178)
76. Le Pondy (18183)
77. Préveranges (18187)
78. Raymond (18191)
79. Reigny (18192)
80. Rezay (18193)
81. Sagonne (18195)
82. Saint-Aignan-des-Noyers (18196)
83. Saint-Amand-Montrond (18197)
84. Saint-Baudel (18199)
85. Saint-Christophe-le-Chaudry (18203)
86. Saint-Denis-de-Palin (18204)
87. Saint-Georges-de-Poisieux (18209)
88. Saint-Germain-des-Bois, Cher (18212)
89. Saint-Hilaire-de-Gondilly (18215)
90. Saint-Hilaire-en-Lignières (18216)
91. Saint-Jeanvrin (18217)
92. Saint-Loup-des-Chaumes (18221)
93. Saint-Maur (18225)
94. Saint-Pierre-les-Bois (18230)
95. Saint-Pierre-les-Étieux (18231)
96. Saint-Priest-la-Marche (18232)
97. Saint-Saturnin (18234)
98. Saint-Symphorien (18236)
99. Saint-Vitte (18238)
100. Sancoins (18242)
101. Saulzais-le-Potier (18245)
102. Serruelles (18250)
103. Sidiailles (18252)
104. Tendron (18260)
105. Thaumiers (18261)
106. Torteron (18265)
107. Touchay (18266)
108. Uzay-le-Venon (18268)
109. Vallenay (18270)
110. Venesmes (18273)
111. Vereaux (18275)
112. Vernais (18276)
113. Verneuil (18277)
114. Vesdun (18278)
115. Villecelin (18283)

== History ==
The arrondissement of Saint-Amand-Montrond was created in 1800.

As a result of the reorganisation of the cantons of France which came into effect in 2015, the borders of the cantons are no longer related to the borders of the arrondissements. The cantons of the arrondissement of Saint-Amand-Montrond were, as of January 2015:

1. Charenton-du-Cher
2. Châteaumeillant
3. Châteauneuf-sur-Cher
4. Le Châtelet
5. Dun-sur-Auron
6. La Guerche-sur-l'Aubois
7. Lignières
8. Nérondes
9. Saint-Amand-Montrond
10. Sancoins
11. Saulzais-le-Potier
