= Villecelin =

- Commune
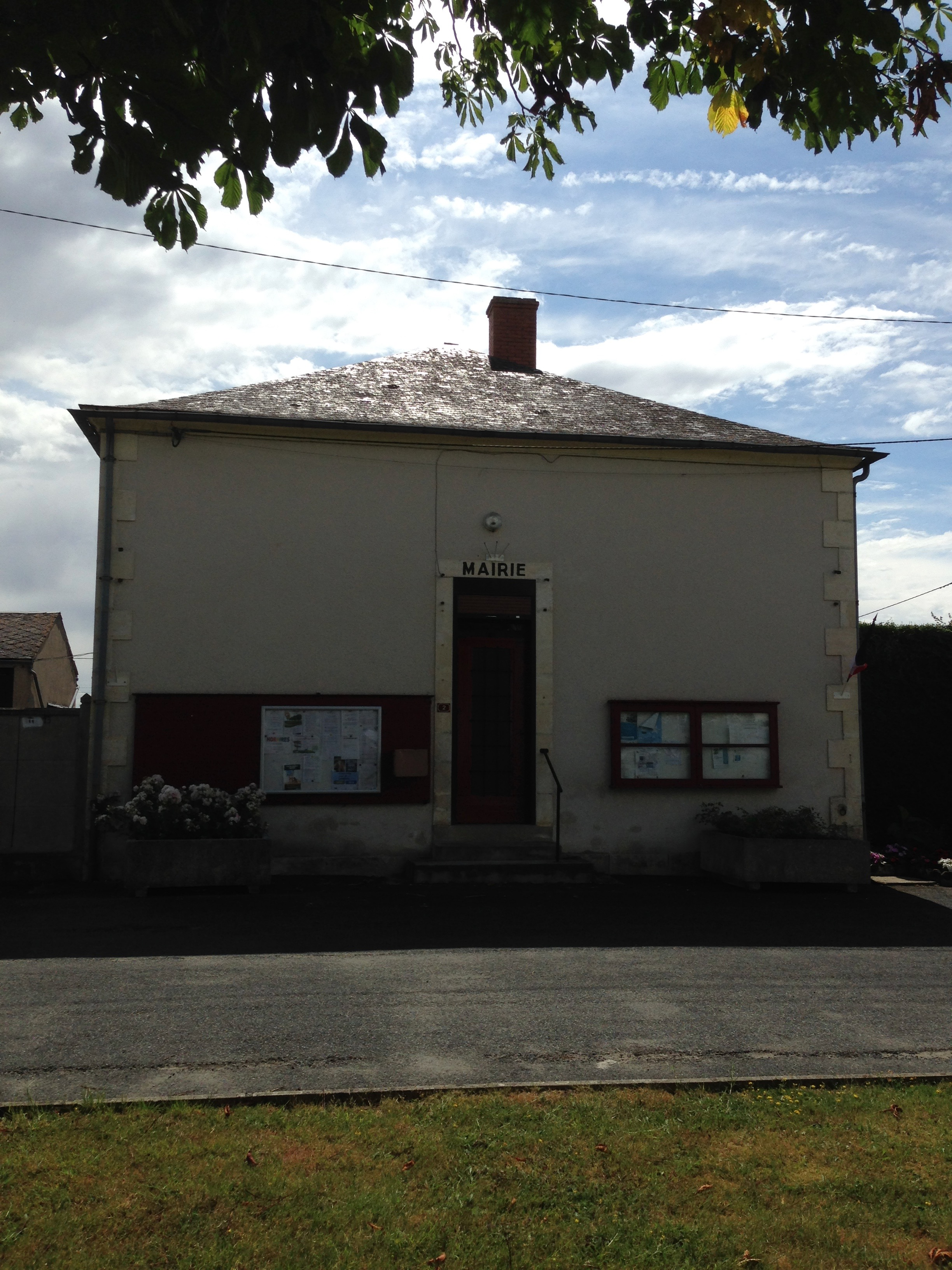
- Mairie of Villecelin
- Location of Villecelin
- Location within France Location within Centre-Val de Loire
- Coordinates: 46°49′36″N 2°10′57″E
- Country: France
- Region: Centre-Val de Loire
- Department: Cher
- Arrondissement: Saint-Amand-Montrond
- Canton: Châteaumeillant
- Intercommunality: CC Arnon Boischaut Cher

Government
  - Mayor (2020–2026): Angélique Wozniak
- Area^{1}: 9.39 km^{2} (3.63 sq mi)
- Elevation: 150 m (490 ft)
- Highest elevation: 183 m (600 ft)
- Lowest elevation: 145 m (476 ft)
- Population (2023): 83
  - Density: 8.8/km^{2} (23/sq mi)
- Time zone: UTC+01:00 (CET)
  - Summer (DST): UTC+02:00 (CEST)
- INSEE/Postal code: 18283 /18160
- ^{1} French Land Register data, which excludes lakes, ponds, glaciers > 1 km^{2} (0.386 sq mi or 247 acres) and river estuaries.

Villecelin (French pronunciation: [vilsəlɛ̃]) is a commune in the Cher department in the Centre-Val de Loire region of France.

== Geography ==
A farming area comprising a village and two hamlets situated on the banks of the river Arnon, about 25 miles (40 km) southwest of Bourges on the D115 road.

== Population ==
Historical population
Year	Pop.	±% p.a.
1968	153	—
1975	133	−1.98%
1982	117	−1.81%
1990	102	−1.70%
1999	106	+0.43%
2007	106	+0.00%
2012	108	+0.37%
2017	94	−2.74%
2023	83	−2.05%
Source: INSEE

== Sights ==
- A feudal motte at Beauvoir.
- A watermill at Beauvoir.

== See also ==
- Communes of the Cher department
