= Saint-Priest-la-Marche =

- Commune
- Location of Saint-Priest-la-Marche
- Location within France Location within Centre-Val de Loire
- Coordinates: 46°27′00″N 2°10′38″E
- Country: France
- Region: Centre-Val de Loire
- Department: Cher
- Arrondissement: Saint-Amand-Montrond
- Canton: Châteaumeillant

Government
  - Mayor (2020–2026): Jean Giraud
- Area^{1}: 20.33 km^{2} (7.85 sq mi)
- Elevation: 400 m (1,300 ft)
- Highest elevation: 500 m (1,600 ft)
- Lowest elevation: 339 m (1,112 ft)
- Population (2023): 237
  - Density: 11.7/km^{2} (30.2/sq mi)
- Time zone: UTC+01:00 (CET)
  - Summer (DST): UTC+02:00 (CEST)
- INSEE/Postal code: 18232 /18370
- ^{1} French Land Register data, which excludes lakes, ponds, glaciers > 1 km^{2} (0.386 sq mi or 247 acres) and river estuaries.

Saint-Priest-la-Marche (French pronunciation: [sɛ̃ pʁijɛ(st) la maʁʃ]) is a commune in the Cher department in the Centre-Val de Loire region of France.

== Geography ==
A farming area comprising the village and several hamlets situated by the banks of the Indre, about 48 miles (77 km) south of Bourges at the junction of the D203 with the D3e road. It is the southernmost commune of the department and borders the departments of Indre and Creuse.

== Population ==
Historical population
Year	Pop.	±% p.a.
1968	425	—
1975	345	−2.94%
1982	282	−2.84%
1990	228	−2.62%
1999	243	+0.71%
2007	232	−0.58%
2012	229	−0.26%
2017	229	+0.00%
2023	237	+0.57%
Source: INSEE

== Sights ==
- The church of St. Priest, dating from the nineteenth century.
- The chateau of La Courcelle with its park and lake.
- A watermill.

== See also ==
- Communes of the Cher department
