= Vesdun =

- Commune
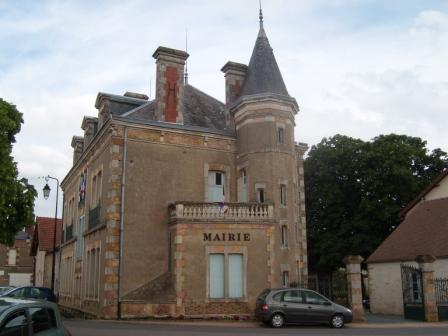
- Town hall

- Coat of arms
- Location of Vesdun
- Location within France Location within Centre-Val de Loire
- Coordinates: 46°32′23″N 2°25′49″E
- Country: France
- Region: Centre-Val de Loire
- Department: Cher
- Arrondissement: Saint-Amand-Montrond
- Canton: Châteaumeillant

Government
  - Mayor (2020–2026): Gilles Pointereau
- Area^{1}: 48.61 km^{2} (18.77 sq mi)
- Elevation: 324 m (1,063 ft)
- Highest elevation: 367 m (1,204 ft)
- Lowest elevation: 219 m (719 ft)
- Population (2023): 540
  - Density: 11/km^{2} (29/sq mi)
- Time zone: UTC+01:00 (CET)
  - Summer (DST): UTC+02:00 (CEST)
- INSEE/Postal code: 18278 /18360
- ^{1} French Land Register data, which excludes lakes, ponds, glaciers > 1 km^{2} (0.386 sq mi or 247 acres) and river estuaries.

Vesdun (French pronunciation: [vedœ̃]) is a commune in the Cher department in the Centre-Val de Loire region of France.

== Geography ==
A large area of streams, lakes and farming comprising a village and many hamlets situated about 40 miles (64 km) south of Bourges at the junction of the D4 and D67 roads. The commune shares its southern border with that of the department of Allier. Vesdun is one of seven localities claiming the title of the geographical centre of France (if the coastal islands are included).

== Population ==
Historical population
Year	Pop.	±% p.a.
1968	800	—
1975	718	−1.53%
1982	721	+0.06%
1990	683	−0.67%
1999	623	−1.02%
2007	631	+0.16%
2012	600	−1.00%
2017	564	−1.23%
2023	540	−0.72%
Source: INSEE

== Sights ==
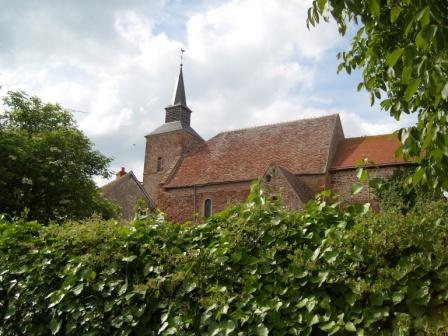
The church

- The church of St. Cyr, dating from the twelfth century
- The chateau of La Cour.
- A preserved sixteenth-century house.

== See also ==
- Communes of the Cher department
