= Touchay =

- Commune
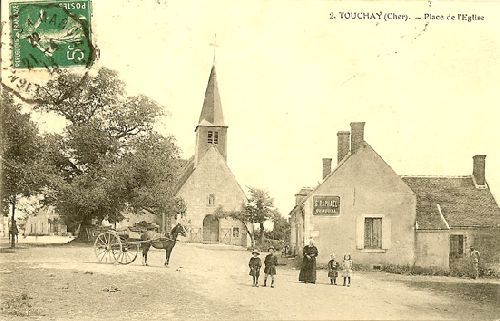
- An old postcard view of the church of Saint-Martin, in Touchay, circa. 1900
- Location of Touchay
- Location within France Location within Centre-Val de Loire
- Coordinates: 46°42′47″N 2°12′45″E
- Country: France
- Region: Centre-Val de Loire
- Department: Cher
- Arrondissement: Saint-Amand-Montrond
- Canton: Châteaumeillant

Government
  - Mayor (2020–2026): Marilyne Brossat
- Area^{1}: 23.41 km^{2} (9.04 sq mi)
- Elevation: 245 m (804 ft)
- Highest elevation: 246 m (807 ft)
- Lowest elevation: 161 m (528 ft)
- Population (2023): 220
  - Density: 9.4/km^{2} (24/sq mi)
- Time zone: UTC+01:00 (CET)
  - Summer (DST): UTC+02:00 (CEST)
- INSEE/Postal code: 18266 /18160
- ^{1} French Land Register data, which excludes lakes, ponds, glaciers > 1 km^{2} (0.386 sq mi or 247 acres) and river estuaries.

Touchay (French pronunciation: [tuʃɛ]) is a commune in the Cher department in the Centre-Val de Loire region of France.

== Geography ==
A farming area comprising the village and several hamlets situated on the banks of the river Arnon, about 23 miles (37 km) southwest of Bourges on the D69 road.

== Population ==
Historical population
Year	Pop.	±% p.a.
1968	342	—
1975	286	−2.52%
1982	298	+0.59%
1990	286	−0.51%
1999	297	+0.42%
2007	278	−0.82%
2012	278	+0.00%
2017	262	−1.18%
2023	220	−2.87%
Source: INSEE

== Sights ==
- The church of St. Martin, dating from the fifteenth century.
- The fifteenth-century manorhouse de l’Asnerie.
- The fifteenth-century chateau of l'Isle-sur-Arnon.

== Personalities ==
- Maurice Utrillo, artist, lived here and created a painting of the village square.

== See also ==
- Communes of the Cher department
