= Saint-Saturnin, Cher =

Saint-Saturnin
- Commune
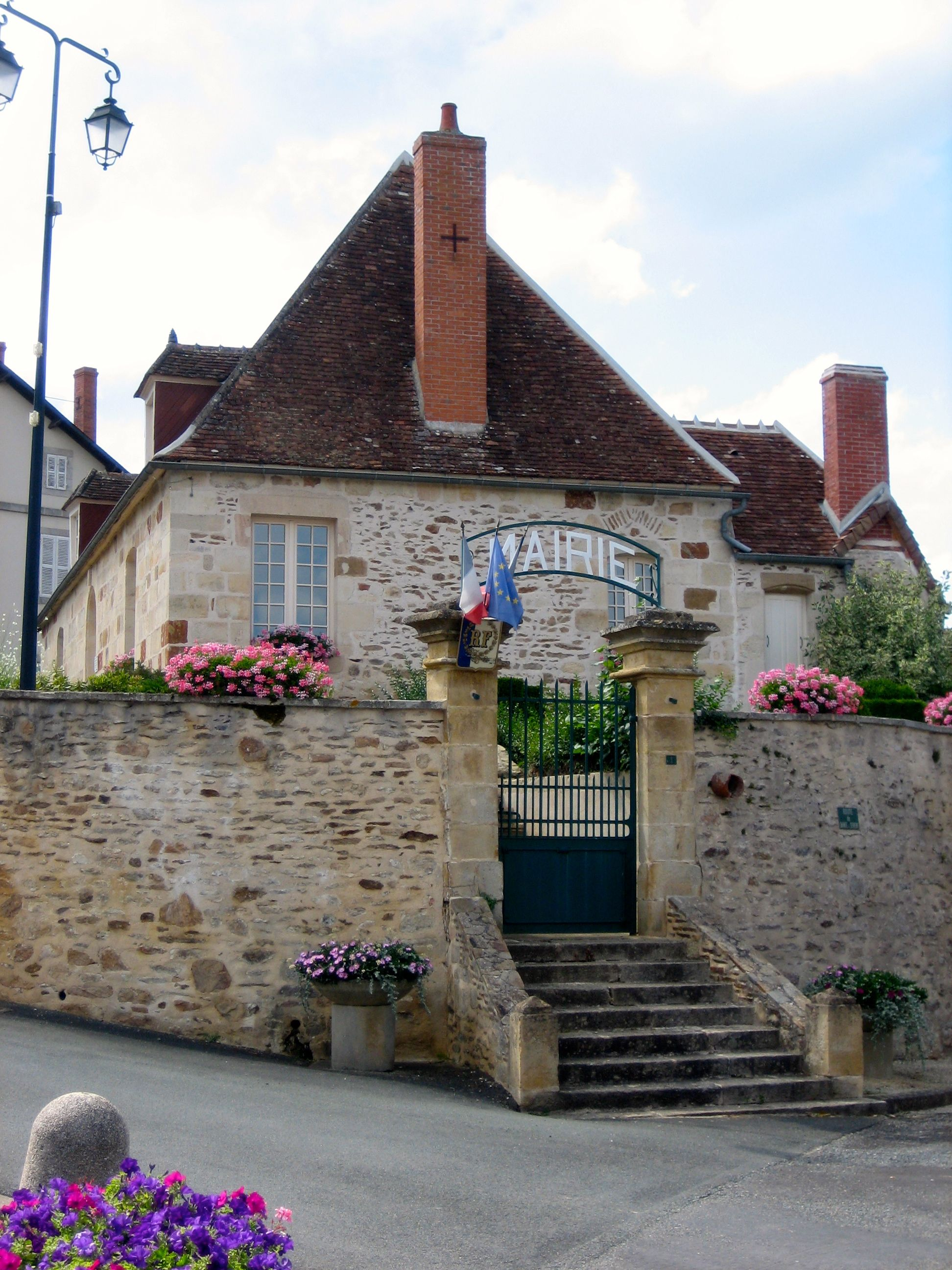
- The town hall in Saint-Saturnin

- Coat of arms
- Location of Saint-Saturnin
- Location within France Location within Centre-Val de Loire
- Coordinates: 46°30′30″N 2°14′19″E
- Country: France
- Region: Centre-Val de Loire
- Department: Cher
- Arrondissement: Saint-Amand-Montrond
- Canton: Châteaumeillant

Government
  - Mayor (2020–2026): Gérard Durand
- Area^{1}: 39.04 km^{2} (15.07 sq mi)
- Elevation: 380 m (1,250 ft)
- Highest elevation: 442 m (1,450 ft)
- Lowest elevation: 282 m (925 ft)
- Population (2023): 446
  - Density: 11.4/km^{2} (29.6/sq mi)
- Time zone: UTC+01:00 (CET)
  - Summer (DST): UTC+02:00 (CEST)
- INSEE/Postal code: 18234 /18370
- ^{1} French Land Register data, which excludes lakes, ponds, glaciers > 1 km^{2} (0.386 sq mi or 247 acres) and river estuaries.

Saint-Saturnin (French pronunciation: [sɛ̃ satyʁnɛ̃]) is a commune in the Cher department in the Centre-Val de Loire region of France.

== Geography ==
An area of streams, forestry and farming comprising the village and several hamlets situated by the banks of the small river Cotet, about 44 miles (71 km) south of Bourges at the junction of the D3 with the D111 and the D162 roads. The commune shares a border with the department of Indre.

== Population ==
Historical population
Year	Pop.	±% p.a.
1968	830	—
1975	683	−2.75%
1982	605	−1.72%
1990	513	−2.04%
1999	466	−1.06%
2007	428	−1.06%
2012	417	−0.52%
2017	422	+0.24%
2023	446	+0.93%
Source: INSEE

== Sights ==
- The parish church of St. Saturnin dates from the twelfth century with significant restoration work in 1729 and 1929.

== See also ==
- Communes of the Cher department
