= Communes of the Cher department =

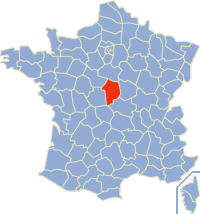

The following is a list of the 286 communes of the Cher department of France.

The communes cooperate in the following intercommunalities (as of 2025):

- Communauté d'agglomération Bourges Plus
- Communauté de communes Arnon Boischaut Cher
- Communauté de communes Berry Grand Sud
- Communauté de communes Berry-Loire-Vauvise
- Communauté de communes Les Bertranges (partly)
- Communauté de communes Cœur de Berry
- Communauté de communes du Cœur de France
- Communauté de communes Le Dunois
- Communauté de communes FerCher
- Communauté de communes Pays de Nérondes
- Communauté de communes du Pays d'Issoudun (partly)
- Communauté de communes Pays Fort Sancerrois Val de Loire
- Communauté de communes Portes du Berry entre Loire et Val d'Aubois
- Communauté de communes Sauldre et Sologne
- Communauté de communes de la Septaine
- Communauté de communes Terres du Haut Berry
- Communauté de communes Les Trois Provinces
- Communauté de communes Vierzon-Sologne-Berry

== List ==
INSEE	Postal	Commune
18001	18250	Achères
18002	18200	Ainay-le-Vieil
18003	18220	Les Aix-d'Angillon
18004	18110	Allogny
18005	18500	Allouis
18006	18340	Annoix
18007	18150	Apremont-sur-Allier
18008	18340	Arçay
18009	18200	Arcomps
18010	18170	Ardenais
18011	18410	Argent-sur-Sauldre
18012	18140	Argenvières
18013	18200	Arpheuilles
18014	18260	Assigny
18015	18700	Aubigny-sur-Nère
18016	18220	Aubinges
18017	18600	Augy-sur-Aubois
18018	18520	Avord
18019	18220	Azy
18020	18300	Bannay
18021	18210	Bannegon
18022	18260	Barlieu
18023	18800	Baugy
18024	18370	Beddes
18025	18320	Beffes
18026	18240	Belleville-sur-Loire
18027	18520	Bengy-sur-Craon
18028	18500	Berry-Bouy
18029	18210	Bessais-le-Fromental
18030	18410	Blancafort
18031	18350	Blet
18032	18240	Boulleret
18033	18000	Bourges
18034	18200	Bouzais
18035	18220	Brécy
18036	18120	Brinay
18037	18410	Brinon-sur-Sauldre
18038	18200	Bruère-Allichamps
18039	18300	Bué
18040	18130	Bussy
18041	18360	La Celette
18042	18200	La Celle
18043	18160	La Celle-Condé
18044	18120	Cerbois
18045	18130	Chalivoy-Milon
18046	18190	Chambon
18047	18380	La Chapelle-d'Angillon
18048	18150	La Chapelle-Hugon
18049	18140	La Chapelle-Montlinard
18050	18570	La Chapelle-Saint-Ursin
18051	18250	La Chapelotte
18052	18210	Charenton-du-Cher
18053	18140	Charentonnay
18054	18350	Charly
18055	18290	Chârost
18056	18800	Chassy
18057	18370	Châteaumeillant
18058	18190	Châteauneuf-sur-Cher
18059	18170	Le Châtelet
18060	18350	Chaumont
18061	18140	Chaumoux-Marcilly
18062	18150	Le Chautay
18063	18190	Chavannes
18064	18120	Chéry
18065	18160	Chezal-Benoît
18066	18290	Civray
18067	18410	Clémont
18068	18130	Cogny
18069	18200	Colombiers
18070	18260	Concressault
18071	18130	Contres
18072	18350	Cornusse
18073	18190	Corquoy
18074	18300	Couargues
18075	18320	Cours-les-Barres
18076	18210	Coust
18077	18140	Couy
18078	18190	Crézançay-sur-Cher
18079	18300	Crézancy-en-Sancerre
18080	18350	Croisy
18081	18340	Crosses
18082	18150	Cuffy
18083	18270	Culan
18084	18260	Dampierre-en-Crot
18085	18310	Dampierre-en-Graçay
18086	18200	Drevant
18087	18130	Dun-sur-Auron
18088	18380	Ennordres
18089	18360	Épineuil-le-Fleuriel
18090	18800	Étréchy
18091	18200	Farges-Allichamps
18092	18800	Farges-en-Septaine
18093	18360	Faverdines
18094	18300	Feux
18095	18350	Flavigny
18096	18500	Foëcy
18097	18110	Fussy
18098	18300	Gardefort
18099	18140	Garigny
18100	18310	Genouilly
18101	18150	Germigny-l'Exempt
18102	18600	Givardon
18103	18310	Graçay
18104	18140	Groises
18105	18800	Gron
18106	18600	Grossouvre
18107	18200	La Groutte
18108	18150	La Guerche-sur-l'Aubois
18109	18250	Henrichemont
18110	18140	Herry
18111	18250	Humbligny
18112	18170	Ids-Saint-Roch
18113	18350	Ignol
18114	18160	Ineuil
18115	18380	Ivoy-le-Pré
18116	18300	Jalognes
18117	18260	Jars
18118	18320	Jouet-sur-l'Aubois
18119	18130	Jussy-Champagne
18120	18140	Jussy-le-Chaudrier
18121	18130	Lantan
18122	18340	Lapan
18124	18120	Lazenay
18125	18240	Léré
18126	18340	Levet
18127	18160	Lignières
18128	18120	Limeux
18129	18340	Lissay-Lochy
18130	18170	Loye-sur-Arnon
18132	18140	Lugny-Champagne
18133	18400	Lunery
18134	18120	Lury-sur-Arnon
18135	18170	Maisonnais
18136	18170	Marçais
18137	18290	Mareuil-sur-Arnon
18138	18500	Marmagne
18139	18320	Marseilles-lès-Aubigny
18140	18120	Massay
18141	18500	Mehun-sur-Yèvre
18142	18200	Meillant
18143	18320	Menetou-Couture
18144	18300	Menetou-Râtel
18145	18510	Menetou-Salon

INSEE	Postal	Commune
18146	18300	Ménétréol-sous-Sancerre
18147	18700	Ménétréol-sur-Sauldre
18148	18120	Méreau
18149	18380	Méry-ès-Bois
18150	18100	Méry-sur-Cher
18151	18250	Montigny
18152	18160	Montlouis
18153	18170	Morlac
18154	18350	Mornay-Berry
18155	18600	Mornay-sur-Allier
18156	18220	Morogues
18157	18570	Morthomiers
18158	18390	Moulins-sur-Yèvre
18159	18330	Nançay
18160	18350	Nérondes
18161	18600	Neuilly-en-Dun
18162	18250	Neuilly-en-Sancerre
18163	18250	Neuvy-Deux-Clochers
18164	18600	Neuvy-le-Barrois
18165	18330	Neuvy-sur-Barangeon
18166	18390	Nohant-en-Goût
18167	18310	Nohant-en-Graçay
18168	18260	Le Noyer
18169	18200	Nozières
18170	18700	Oizon
18171	18200	Orcenais
18172	18200	Orval
18173	18130	Osmery
18174	18390	Osmoy
18175	18350	Ourouer-les-Bourdelins
18176	18220	Parassy
18177	18130	Parnay
18178	18200	La Perche
18179	18110	Pigny
18180	18340	Plaimpied-Givaudins
18181	18290	Plou
18182	18290	Poisieux
18183	18210	Le Pondy
18184	18140	Précy
18185	18380	Presly
18186	18120	Preuilly
18187	18370	Préveranges
18188	18400	Primelles
18189	18110	Quantilly
18190	18120	Quincy
18191	18130	Raymond
18192	18270	Reigny
18193	18170	Rezay
18194	18220	Rians
18195	18600	Sagonne
18196	18600	Saint-Aignan-des-Noyers
18197	18200	Saint-Amand-Montrond
18198	18290	Saint-Ambroix
18199	18160	Saint-Baudel
18200	18300	Saint-Bouize
18201	18400	Saint-Caprais
18202	18220	Saint-Céols
18203	18270	Saint-Christophe-le-Chaudry
18204	18130	Saint-Denis-de-Palin
18205	18230	Saint-Doulchard
18208	18240	Sainte-Gemme-en-Sancerrois
18206	18110	Saint-Éloy-de-Gy
18227	18700	Sainte-Montaine
18235	18220	Sainte-Solange
18237	18500	Sainte-Thorette
18207	18400	Saint-Florent-sur-Cher
18209	18200	Saint-Georges-de-Poisieux
18210	18100	Saint-Georges-sur-la-Prée
18211	18110	Saint-Georges-sur-Moulon
18212	18340	Saint-Germain-des-Bois
18213	18390	Saint-Germain-du-Puy
18214	18100	Saint-Hilaire-de-Court
18215	18320	Saint-Hilaire-de-Gondilly
18216	18160	Saint-Hilaire-en-Lignières
18217	18370	Saint-Jeanvrin
18218	18340	Saint-Just
18219	18330	Saint-Laurent
18220	18140	Saint-Léger-le-Petit
18221	18190	Saint-Loup-des-Chaumes
18223	18110	Saint-Martin-d'Auxigny
18224	18140	Saint-Martin-des-Champs
18225	18270	Saint-Maur
18226	18390	Saint-Michel-de-Volangis
18228	18310	Saint-Outrille
18229	18110	Saint-Palais
18230	18170	Saint-Pierre-les-Bois
18231	18210	Saint-Pierre-les-Étieux
18232	18370	Saint-Priest-la-Marche
18233	18300	Saint-Satur
18234	18370	Saint-Saturnin
18236	18190	Saint-Symphorien
18238	18360	Saint-Vitte
18240	18140	Sancergues
18241	18300	Sancerre
18242	18600	Sancoins
18243	18240	Santranges
18244	18290	Saugy
18245	18360	Saulzais-le-Potier
18246	18240	Savigny-en-Sancerre
18247	18390	Savigny-en-Septaine
18248	18340	Senneçay
18249	18300	Sens-Beaujeu
18250	18190	Serruelles
18251	18140	Sévry
18252	18270	Sidiailles
18253	18220	Soulangis
18254	18340	Soye-en-Septaine
18255	18570	Le Subdray
18256	18260	Subligny
18258	18300	Sury-en-Vaux
18259	18260	Sury-ès-Bois
18257	18240	Sury-près-Léré
18260	18350	Tendron
18261	18210	Thaumiers
18262	18300	Thauvenay
18263	18100	Thénioux
18264	18260	Thou
18265	18320	Torteron
18266	18160	Touchay
18267	18570	Trouy
18268	18190	Uzay-le-Venon
18269	18260	Vailly-sur-Sauldre
18270	18190	Vallenay
18271	18110	Vasselay
18272	18300	Veaugues
18273	18190	Venesmes
18274	18300	Verdigny
18275	18600	Vereaux
18276	18210	Vernais
18277	18210	Verneuil
18278	18360	Vesdun
18279	18100	Vierzon
18280	18110	Vignoux-sous-les-Aix
18281	18500	Vignoux-sur-Barangeon
18282	18800	Villabon
18283	18160	Villecelin
18284	18260	Villegenon
18285	18400	Villeneuve-sur-Cher
18286	18800	Villequiers
18287	18300	Vinon
18288	18340	Vorly
18289	18130	Vornay
18290	18330	Vouzeron

== See also ==
- Lists of communes of France
- Administrative divisions of France
