= Rezay =

- Commune
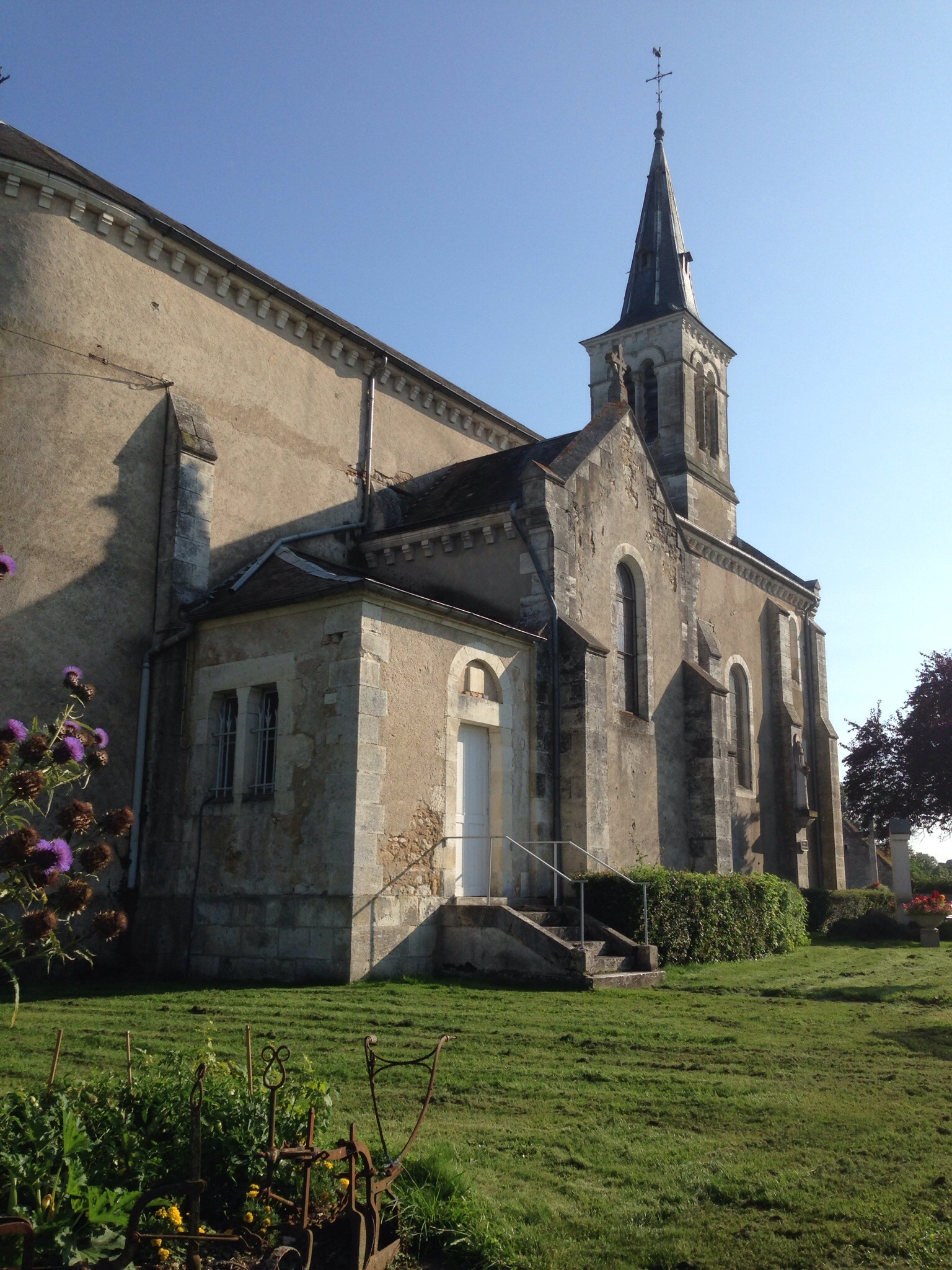
- The church in Rezay

- Coat of arms
- Location of Rezay
- Location within France Location within Centre-Val de Loire
- Coordinates: 46°40′25″N 2°10′46″E
- Country: France
- Region: Centre-Val de Loire
- Department: Cher
- Arrondissement: Saint-Amand-Montrond
- Canton: Châteaumeillant

Government
  - Mayor (2020–2026): Fabienne Levacher
- Area^{1}: 21.26 km^{2} (8.21 sq mi)
- Elevation: 180 m (590 ft)
- Highest elevation: 260 m (850 ft)
- Lowest elevation: 167 m (548 ft)
- Population (2023): 204
  - Density: 9.60/km^{2} (24.9/sq mi)
- Time zone: UTC+01:00 (CET)
  - Summer (DST): UTC+02:00 (CEST)
- INSEE/Postal code: 18193 /18170
- ^{1} French Land Register data, which excludes lakes, ponds, glaciers > 1 km^{2} (0.386 sq mi or 247 acres) and river estuaries.

Rezay (French pronunciation: [ʁəzɛ]) is a commune in the Cher department in the Centre-Val de Loire region of France.

== Geography ==
A farming area comprising the village and a few hamlets situated on the banks of the river Sinaise, about 30 miles (48 km) southwest of Bourges, at the junction of the D80 with the D194 road. The commune borders the department of Indre.

== Population ==
Historical population
Year	Pop.	±% p.a.
1968	343	—
1975	279	−2.91%
1982	262	−0.89%
1990	240	−1.09%
1999	218	−1.06%
2007	229	+0.62%
2012	226	−0.26%
2017	213	−1.18%
2023	204	−0.72%
Source: INSEE

== Sights ==
- The romanesque church of Notre-Dame, rebuilt in the nineteenth century.

== See also ==
- Communes of the Cher department
