= Saint-Pierre-les-Bois =

- Commune
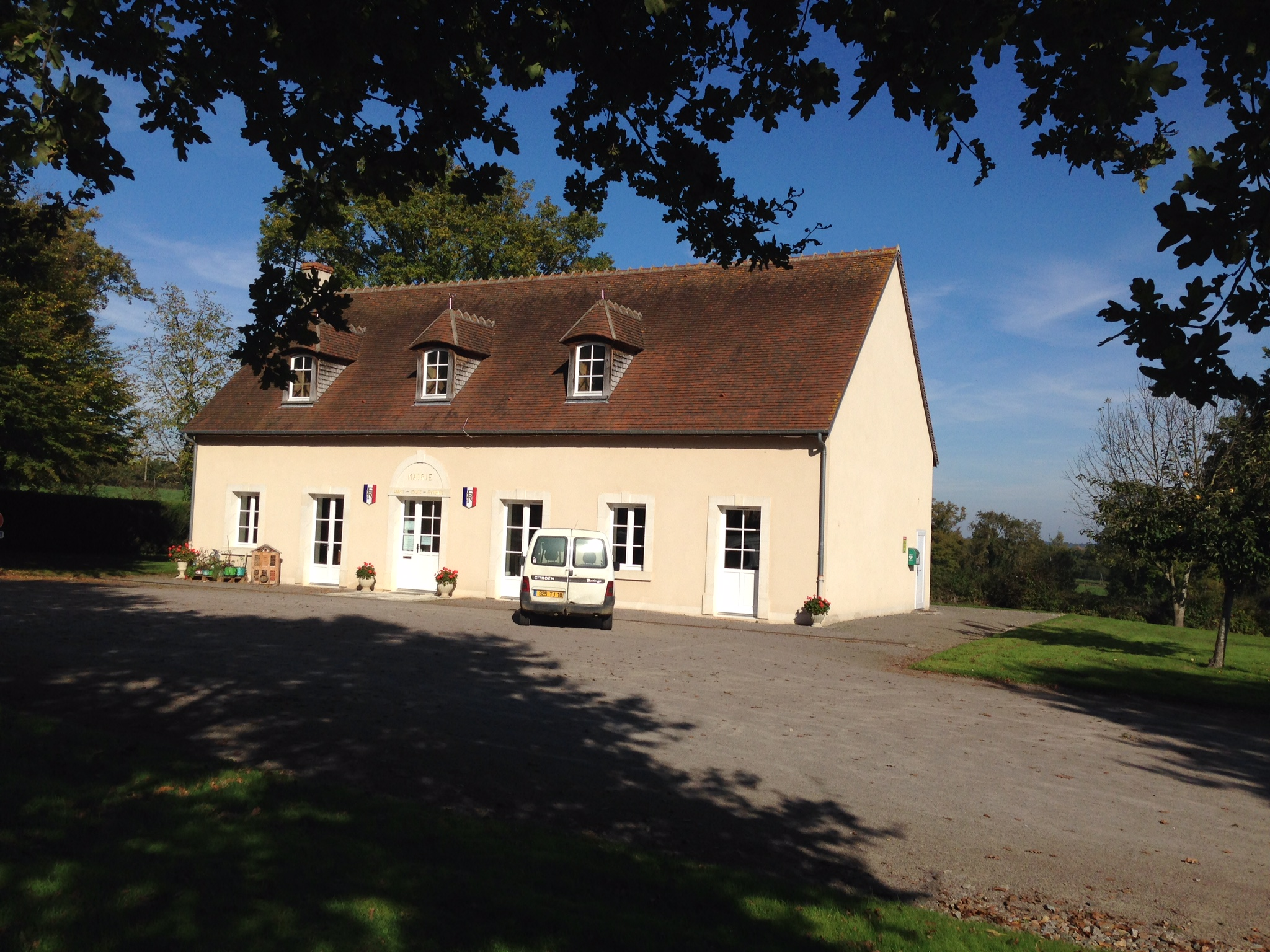
- The town hall in Saint-Pierre-les-Bois
- Location of Saint-Pierre-les-Bois
- Location within France Location within Centre-Val de Loire
- Coordinates: 46°39′55″N 2°16′47″E
- Country: France
- Region: Centre-Val de Loire
- Department: Cher
- Arrondissement: Saint-Amand-Montrond
- Canton: Châteaumeillant

Government
  - Mayor (2020–2026): Claude Schnürer
- Area^{1}: 20.38 km^{2} (7.87 sq mi)
- Highest elevation: 233 m (764 ft)
- Lowest elevation: 170 m (560 ft)
- Population (2023): 261
  - Density: 12.8/km^{2} (33.2/sq mi)
- Time zone: UTC+01:00 (CET)
  - Summer (DST): UTC+02:00 (CEST)
- INSEE/Postal code: 18230 /18170
- ^{1} French Land Register data, which excludes lakes, ponds, glaciers > 1 km^{2} (0.386 sq mi or 247 acres) and river estuaries.

Saint-Pierre-les-Bois (French pronunciation: [sɛ̃ pjɛʁ le bwa]) is a commune in the Cher department in the Centre-Val de Loire region of France.

== Geography ==
A farming area comprising the village and several hamlets situated by the banks of the small river Portefeuille, about 32 miles (51 km) south of Bourges at the junction of the D69 with the D3 road. The river Arnon forms a small part of the commune's northern border.

== Population ==
Historical population
Year	Pop.	±% p.a.
1968	401	—
1975	281	−4.95%
1982	302	+1.03%
1990	299	−0.12%
1999	305	+0.22%
2007	317	+0.48%
2012	307	−0.64%
2017	287	−1.34%
2023	261	−1.57%
Source: INSEE

== Sights ==
- The church of St. Pierre, dating from the twelfth century (historic monument).
- Two eighteenth-century houses.

== See also ==
- Communes of the Cher department
