= Ids-Saint-Roch =

- Commune
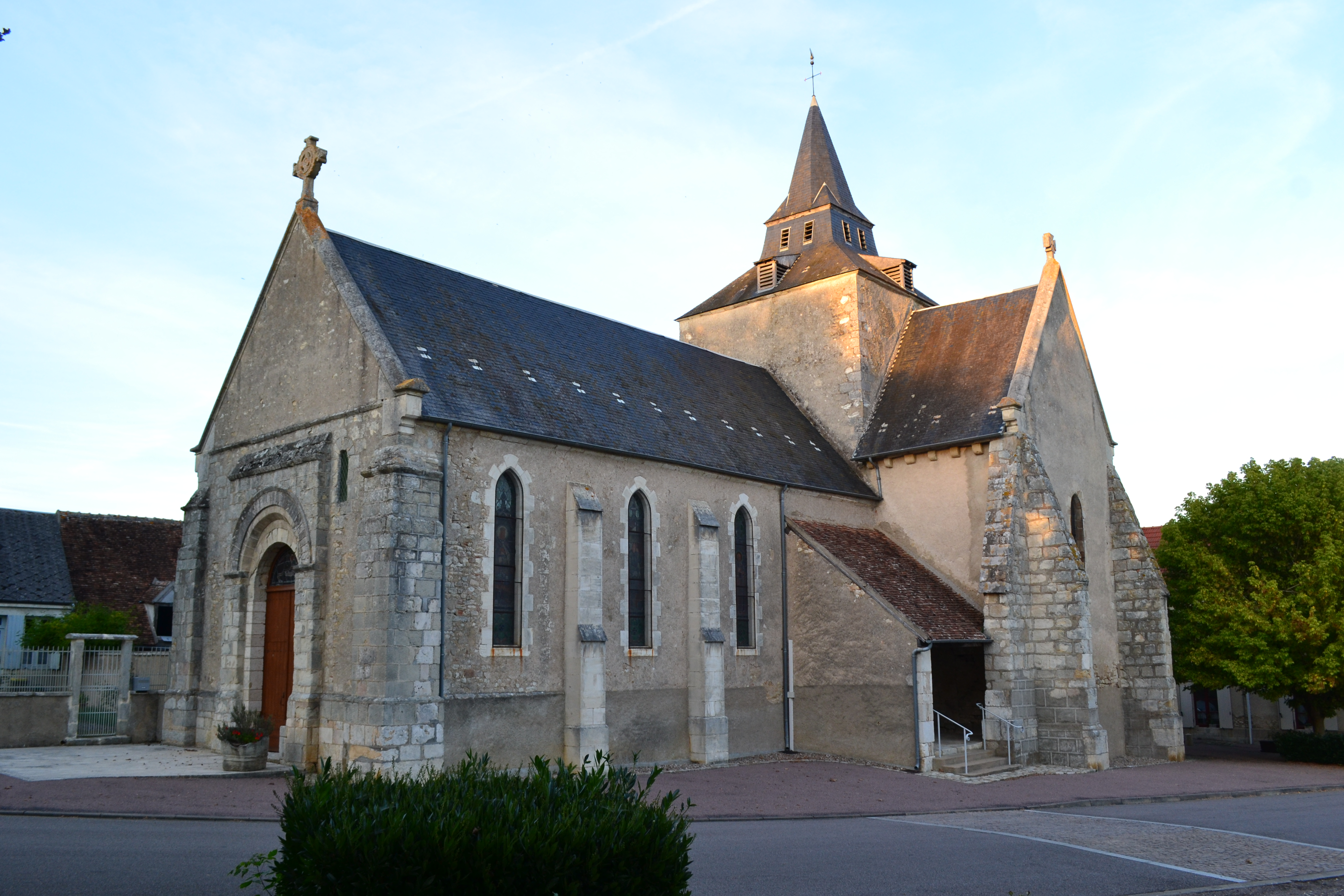
- The church of Saint-Martin and Saint-Roch, in Ids-Saint-Roch
- Location of Ids-Saint-Roch
- Location within France Location within Centre-Val de Loire
- Coordinates: 46°42′29″N 2°14′29″E
- Country: France
- Region: Centre-Val de Loire
- Department: Cher
- Arrondissement: Saint-Amand-Montrond
- Canton: Châteaumeillant
- Intercommunality: Berry Grand Sud

Government
  - Mayor (2020–2026): Martine Fourdraine
- Area^{1}: 27.83 km^{2} (10.75 sq mi)
- Elevation: 200 m (660 ft)
- Highest elevation: 246 m (807 ft)
- Lowest elevation: 165 m (541 ft)
- Population (2023): 295
  - Density: 10.6/km^{2} (27.5/sq mi)
- Time zone: UTC+01:00 (CET)
  - Summer (DST): UTC+02:00 (CEST)
- INSEE/Postal code: 18112 /18170
- ^{1} French Land Register data, which excludes lakes, ponds, glaciers > 1 km^{2} (0.386 sq mi or 247 acres) and river estuaries.

Ids-Saint-Roch is a commune in the Cher department in the Centre-Val de Loire region of France.

== Geography ==
A farming area comprising the village and several hamlets situated in the valley of the river Arnon about 24 miles (39 km) south of Bourges at the junction of the D144, D70 and the D69 roads.

== Population ==
Historical population
Year	Pop.	±% p.a.
1968	433	—
1975	400	−1.13%
1982	342	−2.21%
1990	298	−1.71%
1999	276	−0.85%
2007	306	+1.30%
2012	317	+0.71%
2017	299	−1.16%
2023	295	−0.22%
Source: INSEE

== Sights ==
- The thirteenth-century church of St. Martin.

== See also ==
- Communes of the Cher department
