= Ardenais =

- Commune
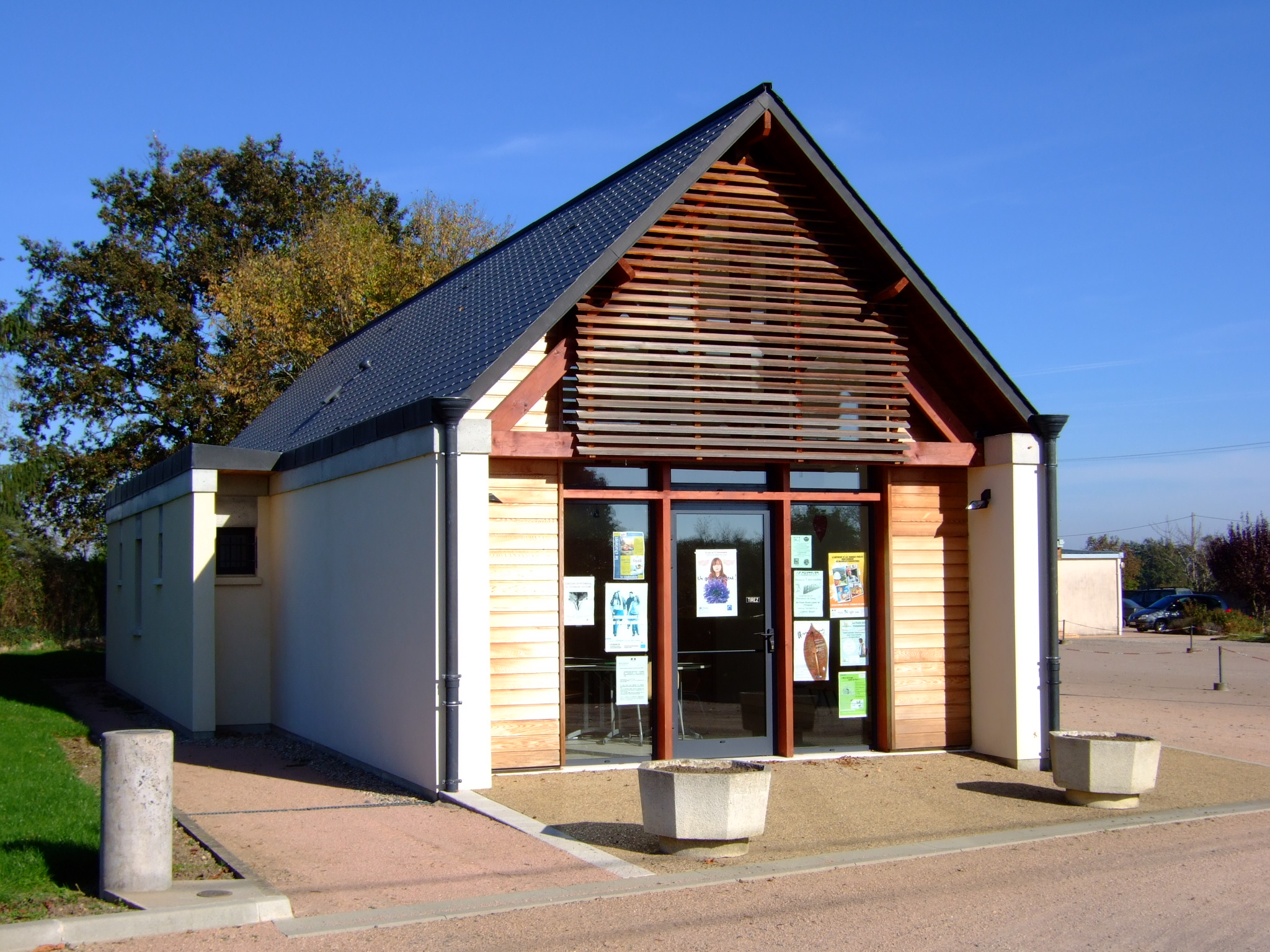
- Town hall
- Location of Ardenais
- Location within France Location within Centre-Val de Loire
- Coordinates: 46°38′53″N 2°21′36″E
- Country: France
- Region: Centre-Val de Loire
- Department: Cher
- Arrondissement: Saint-Amand-Montrond
- Canton: Châteaumeillant
- Intercommunality: Berry Grand Sud

Government
  - Mayor (2020–2026): Gilles Hérault
- Area^{1}: 17.55 km^{2} (6.78 sq mi)
- Elevation: 236 m (774 ft)
- Highest elevation: 262 m (860 ft)
- Lowest elevation: 188 m (617 ft)
- Population (2023): 205
  - Density: 11.7/km^{2} (30.3/sq mi)
- Time zone: UTC+01:00 (CET)
  - Summer (DST): UTC+02:00 (CEST)
- INSEE/Postal code: 18010 /18170
- ^{1} French Land Register data, which excludes lakes, ponds, glaciers > 1 km^{2} (0.386 sq mi or 247 acres) and river estuaries.

Ardenais (French pronunciation: [aʁdənɛ]) is a commune in the Cher department in the Centre-Val de Loire region of France on the left bank of the river Arnon, about 33 miles (53 km) south of Bourges.

== Population ==
Historical population
Year	Pop.	±% p.a.
1968	276	—
1975	210	−3.83%
1982	198	−0.84%
1990	179	−1.25%
1999	152	−1.80%
2007	195	+3.16%
2012	209	+1.40%
2017	200	−0.88%
2023	205	+0.41%
Source: INSEE

== See also ==
- Communes of the Cher department
