= Morlac =

- Commune
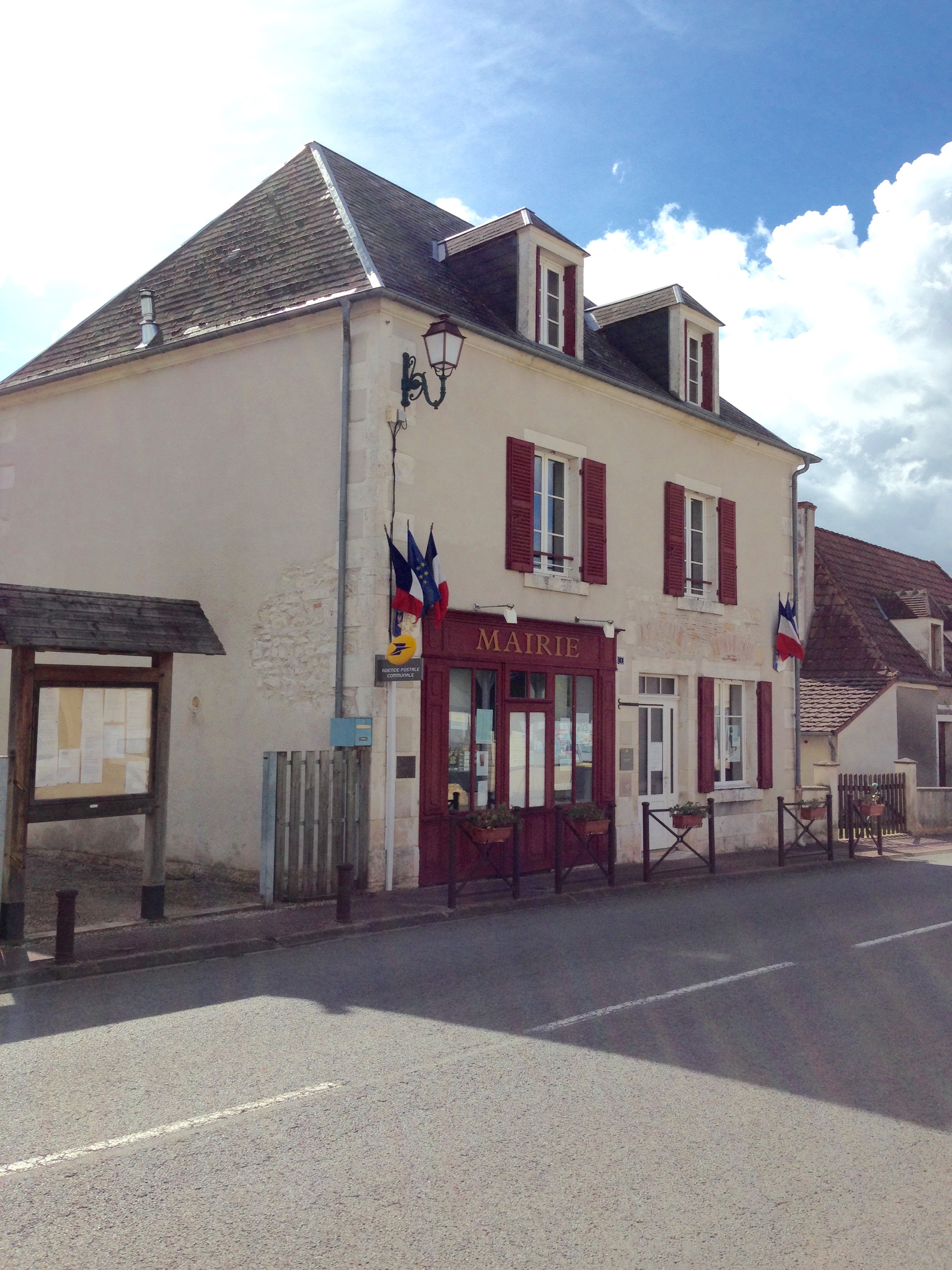
- Town hall
- Location of Morlac
- Location within France Location within Centre-Val de Loire
- Coordinates: 46°43′11″N 2°18′33″E
- Country: France
- Region: Centre-Val de Loire
- Department: Cher
- Arrondissement: Saint-Amand-Montrond
- Canton: Châteaumeillant

Government
  - Mayor (2020–2026): Dominique Dubreuil
- Area^{1}: 32.38 km^{2} (12.50 sq mi)
- Elevation: 229 m (751 ft)
- Highest elevation: 237 m (778 ft)
- Lowest elevation: 165 m (541 ft)
- Population (2023): 269
  - Density: 8.31/km^{2} (21.5/sq mi)
- Time zone: UTC+01:00 (CET)
  - Summer (DST): UTC+02:00 (CEST)
- INSEE/Postal code: 18153 /18170
- ^{1} French Land Register data, which excludes lakes, ponds, glaciers > 1 km^{2} (0.386 sq mi or 247 acres) and river estuaries.

Morlac (French pronunciation: [mɔʁlak]) is a commune in the Cher department in the Centre-Val de Loire region of France.

== Geography ==
An area of forestry and farming comprising the village and a few hamlets, situated some 25 miles (40 km) south of Bourges, at the junction of the D3 with the D925, D70 and D220 roads. The river Arnon flows through the southern part of the commune.

== Population ==
Historical population
Year	Pop.	±% p.a.
1968	477	—
1975	387	−2.94%
1982	314	−2.94%
1990	311	−0.12%
1999	334	+0.80%
2007	345	+0.41%
2012	331	−0.83%
2017	329	−0.12%
2023	269	−3.30%
Source: INSEE

== Sights ==
- The church of St. Martin, dating from the twelfth century
- Traces of a medieval abbey.
- The chateau Gaillard.
- A watermill.

== See also ==
- Communes of the Cher department
