= Châteaumeillant =

Châteaumeillant Chastèlmelhan (Occitan)
- Commune
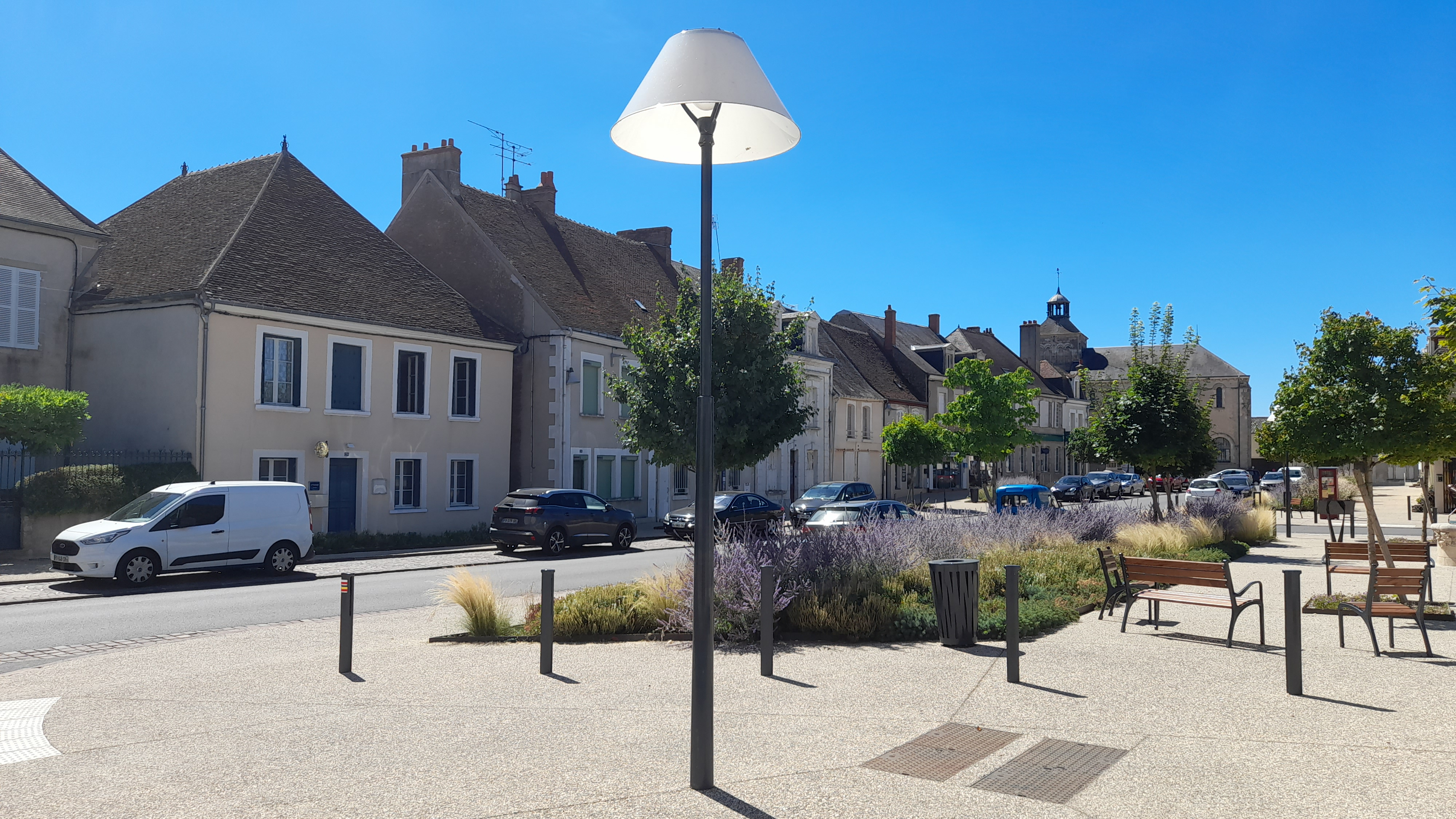
- The town center

- Coat of arms
- Location of Châteaumeillant
- Location within France Location within Centre-Val de Loire
- Coordinates: 46°33′46″N 2°12′05″E
- Country: France
- Region: Centre-Val de Loire
- Department: Cher
- Arrondissement: Saint-Amand-Montrond
- Canton: Châteaumeillant

Government
  - Mayor (2020–2026): Frédéric Durant
- Area^{1}: 42.48 km^{2} (16.40 sq mi)
- Elevation: 253 m (830 ft)
- Highest elevation: 388 m (1,273 ft)
- Lowest elevation: 212 m (696 ft)
- Population (2023): 1,629
  - Density: 38.35/km^{2} (99.32/sq mi)
- Time zone: UTC+01:00 (CET)
  - Summer (DST): UTC+02:00 (CEST)
- INSEE/Postal code: 18057 /18370
- ^{1} French Land Register data, which excludes lakes, ponds, glaciers > 1 km^{2} (0.386 sq mi or 247 acres) and river estuaries.

Châteaumeillant (French: [ʃɑtomɛjɑ̃]; Auvergnat: Chastèlmelhan) is a commune in the Cher department in the Centre-Val de Loire region of France, comprising a small town and several hamlets in the valley of the small river Sinaise, about 40 miles (64 km) south of Bourges.

== Climate ==
On average, Châteaumeillant experiences 59.6 days per year with a minimum temperature below 0 °C (32.0 °F), 1.5 days per year with a minimum temperature below −10 °C (14.0 °F), 4.3 days per year with a maximum temperature below 0 °C (32.0 °F), and 22.9 days per year with a maximum temperature above 30 °C (86.0 °F). The record high temperature was 42.2 °C (108.0 °F) on June 21, 2026, while the record low temperature was −20.9 °C (−5.6 °F) on January 16, 1985.

Climate data for Châteaumeillant (1991–2020 normals, extremes 1969–present)
Month	Jan	Feb	Mar	Apr	May	Jun	Jul	Aug	Sep	Oct	Nov	Dec	Year
Record high °C (°F)	20.5 (68.9)	25.0 (77.0)	25.8 (78.4)	30.0 (86.0)	35.9 (96.6)	42.2 (108.0)	41.2 (106.2)	41.7 (107.1)	38.0 (100.4)	33.9 (93.0)	27.1 (80.8)	23.8 (74.8)	42.2 (108.0)
Mean daily maximum °C (°F)	8.0 (46.4)	9.4 (48.9)	13.4 (56.1)	16.6 (61.9)	20.4 (68.7)	24.3 (75.7)	26.9 (80.4)	26.9 (80.4)	22.6 (72.7)	17.6 (63.7)	11.9 (53.4)	8.5 (47.3)	17.2 (63.0)
Daily mean °C (°F)	4.6 (40.3)	5.0 (41.0)	8.0 (46.4)	10.5 (50.9)	14.3 (57.7)	17.9 (64.2)	20.0 (68.0)	20.0 (68.0)	16.1 (61.0)	12.7 (54.9)	8.0 (46.4)	5.2 (41.4)	11.9 (53.4)
Mean daily minimum °C (°F)	1.3 (34.3)	0.7 (33.3)	2.5 (36.5)	4.5 (40.1)	8.1 (46.6)	11.5 (52.7)	13.2 (55.8)	13.1 (55.6)	9.6 (49.3)	7.8 (46.0)	4.2 (39.6)	1.9 (35.4)	6.5 (43.8)
Record low °C (°F)	−20.9 (−5.6)	−14.8 (5.4)	−14.0 (6.8)	−6.8 (19.8)	−2.0 (28.4)	1.3 (34.3)	4.6 (40.3)	2.8 (37.0)	−3.0 (26.6)	−8.4 (16.9)	−11.1 (12.0)	−13.0 (8.6)	−20.9 (−5.6)
Average precipitation mm (inches)	64.3 (2.53)	52.9 (2.08)	51.9 (2.04)	68.0 (2.68)	84.3 (3.32)	68.0 (2.68)	65.7 (2.59)	60.0 (2.36)	70.8 (2.79)	73.8 (2.91)	71.4 (2.81)	68.2 (2.69)	799.3 (31.48)
Average precipitation days (≥ 1.0 mm)	12.0	10.7	9.9	10.7	11.2	9.3	8.1	7.3	8.4	11.4	12.3	12.4	123.7
Source: Meteociel

== Population ==
Historical population
Year	Pop.	±% p.a.
1968	2,528	—
1975	2,429	−0.57%
1982	2,186	−1.49%
1990	2,081	−0.61%
1999	2,058	−0.12%
2007	2,088	+0.18%
2012	2,002	−0.84%
2017	1,780	−2.32%
2023	1,629	−1.47%
Source: INSEE
