= Maisonnais =

- Commune
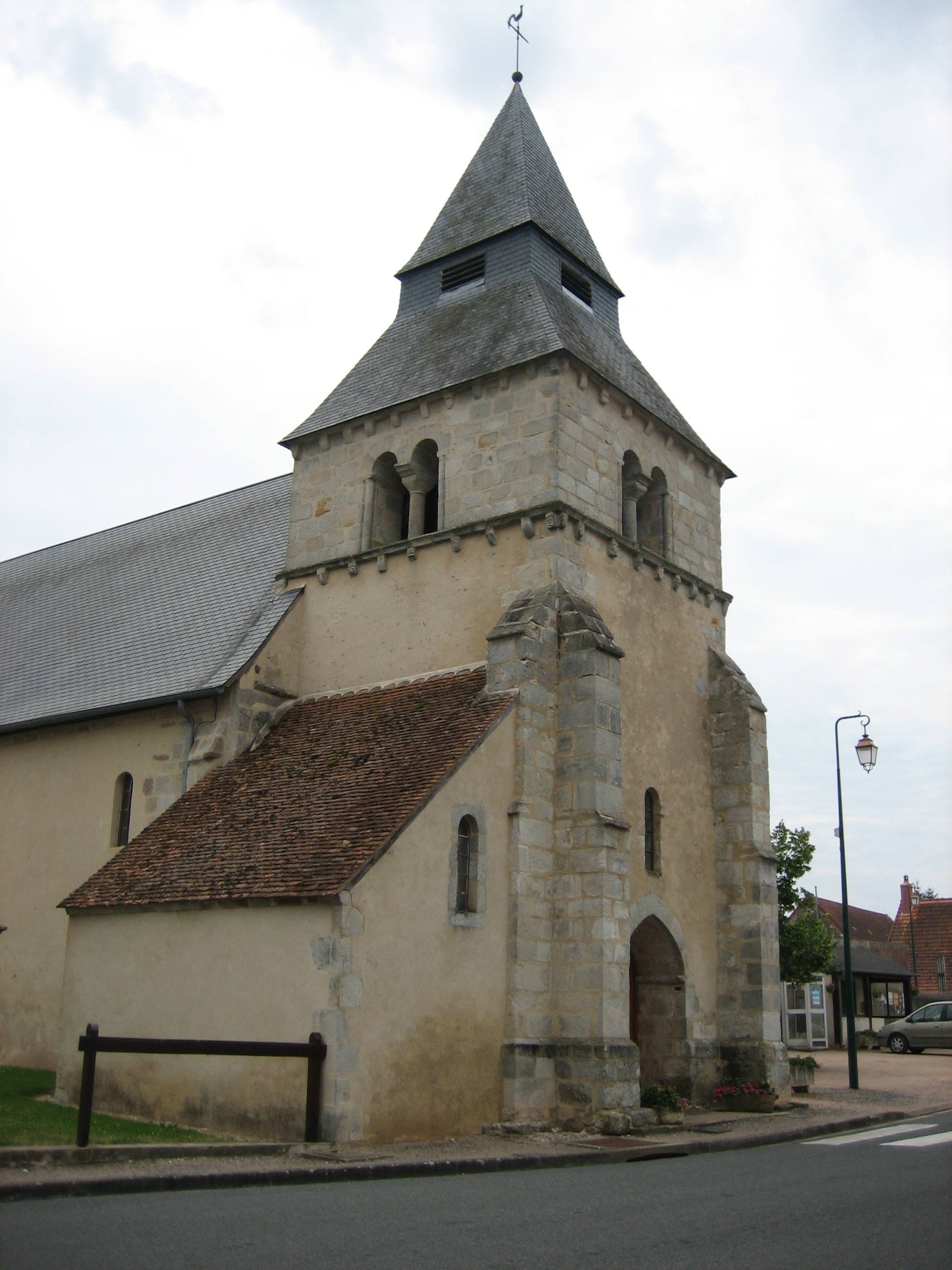
- The church of Saint-Pierre and Saint-Paul, in Maisonnais
- Location of Maisonnais
- Location within France Location within Centre-Val de Loire
- Coordinates: 46°38′27″N 2°12′59″E
- Country: France
- Region: Centre-Val de Loire
- Department: Cher
- Arrondissement: Saint-Amand-Montrond
- Canton: Châteaumeillant

Government
  - Mayor (2020–2026): Jean-Paul Duplessi
- Area^{1}: 26.95 km^{2} (10.41 sq mi)
- Elevation: 240 m (790 ft)
- Highest elevation: 247 m (810 ft)
- Lowest elevation: 182 m (597 ft)
- Population (2023): 227
  - Density: 8.42/km^{2} (21.8/sq mi)
- Time zone: UTC+01:00 (CET)
  - Summer (DST): UTC+02:00 (CEST)
- INSEE/Postal code: 18135 /18170
- ^{1} French Land Register data, which excludes lakes, ponds, glaciers > 1 km^{2} (0.386 sq mi or 247 acres) and river estuaries.

Maisonnais (French pronunciation: [mɛzɔnɛ]) is a commune in the Cher department in the Centre-Val de Loire region of France.

== Geography ==
A farming area comprising the village and several hamlets, situated by the banks of the river Sinaise some 32 miles (51 km) south of Bourges, on the D65 road and at the junction of the D70 and the D951 roads. The river forms much of the commune’s southwestern border with the department of Indre.

== Population ==
Historical population
Year	Pop.	±% p.a.
1968	389	—
1975	326	−2.49%
1982	276	−2.35%
1990	239	−1.78%
1999	221	−0.87%
2007	214	−0.40%
2012	237	+2.06%
2017	239	+0.17%
2023	227	−0.85%
Source: INSEE

== Sights ==
- The remains of several buildings from the medieval Orsan Priory.
- The church of Saints Peter and Paul, dating from the 12th century.
- The ornamental gardens of the priory.

== See also ==
- Communes of the Cher department
