= Canton of Charenton-du-Cher =

Coordinates: 46°43′50″N 2°39′11″E

Charenton-du-Cher
- Former canton
- Interactive map of Charenton-du-Cher
- Country: France
- Region: Centre-Val de Loire
- Department: Cher
- No. of communes: {{{nbcomm}}}
- Disbanded: 2015
- Area: 251.76 km^{2} (97.21 sq mi)
- Population (2012): 3,961
  - Density: 15.73/km^{2} (40.75/sq mi)

The Canton of Charenton-du-Cher is a former canton situated in the Cher département and in the Centre region of France. It was disbanded following the French canton reorganisation which came into effect in March 2015. It consisted of 9 communes, which joined the canton of Dun-sur-Auron in 2015. It had 3,961 inhabitants (2012).

== Geography ==
An area of lakes and rivers, farming and forestry in the eastern part of the arrondissement of Saint-Amand-Montrond centred on the town of Charenton-du-Cher. The altitude varies from 153 m (502 ft) at Coust to 308 m (1,010 ft) at Arpheuilles, with an average altitude of 190 m (620 ft).

The canton comprised 9 communes:

- Arpheuilles
- Bannegon
- Bessais-le-Fromental
- Charenton-du-Cher
- Coust
- Le Pondy
- Saint-Pierre-les-Étieux
- Thaumiers
- Vernais

== Population ==
Historical population Canton of Charenton-du-Cher
Year	1962	1968	1975	1982	1990	1999
Pop.	4,735	4,932	4,485	4,138	4,135	4,017
±%	—	+4.2%	−9.1%	−7.7%	−0.1%	−2.9%
From the year 1962 on: No double counting – residents of multiple communes (e.g. students and military personnel) are counted only once. Source: INSEE

== See also ==
- Arrondissements of the Cher department
- Cantons of the Cher department
- Communes of the Cher department
