= Communauté de communes du Berry charentonnais =

Berry charentonnais
- Former communauté de communes
- Country: France
- Region: Centre-Val de Loire
- Department: Cher
- No. of communes: {{{nbcomm}}}
- Established: 2000
- Disbanded: 2013
- Area: 251.76 km^{2} (97.21 sq mi)
- Population (1999): 4,073
  - Density: 16.18/km^{2} (41.90/sq mi)

The communauté de communes du Berry charentonnais was created on December 29, 1999 and was located in the Cher département of the Centre region of France. It was created in January 2000. It was merged into the Communauté de communes du Cœur de France in January 2013.

The Communauté de communes comprised the following communes:

1. Arpheuilles
2. Bannegon
3. Bessais-le-Fromental
4. Charenton-du-Cher
5. Coust
6. Le Pondy
7. Saint-Pierre-les-Étieux
8. Thaumiers
9. Vernais
