= Verneuil, Cher =

Verneuil
- Commune
- Coat of arms
- Location of Verneuil
- Location within France Location within Centre-Val de Loire
- Coordinates: 46°49′04″N 2°36′19″E
- Country: France
- Region: Centre-Val de Loire
- Department: Cher
- Arrondissement: Saint-Amand-Montrond
- Canton: Dun-sur-Auron
- Intercommunality: CC Le Dunois

Government
  - Mayor (2026–32): Jean-Marie Deleuze
- Area^{1}: 11.04 km^{2} (4.26 sq mi)
- Elevation: 160 m (520 ft)
- Highest elevation: 188 m (617 ft)
- Lowest elevation: 161 m (528 ft)
- Population (2023): 34
  - Density: 3.1/km^{2} (8.0/sq mi)
- Time zone: UTC+01:00 (CET)
  - Summer (DST): UTC+02:00 (CEST)
- INSEE/Postal code: 18277 /18210
- ^{1} French Land Register data, which excludes lakes, ponds, glaciers > 1 km^{2} (0.386 sq mi or 247 acres) and river estuaries.

Verneuil (French pronunciation: [vɛʁnœj]) is a commune in the Cher department in the Centre-Val de Loire region of France.

== Geography ==
A very small village of forestry and farming situated on the banks of the canal de Berry and the Auron, about 20 miles (32 km) southeast of Bourges on the D92 road.

== Population ==
Historical population
Year	Pop.	±% p.a.
1968	68	—
1975	44	−6.03%
1982	48	+1.25%
1990	39	−2.56%
1999	37	−0.58%
2007	47	+3.04%
2012	38	−4.16%
2017	34	−2.20%
2023	34	+0.00%
Source: INSEE

== Sights ==
- The chateau of Torchefoulon.
- Remains of a fifteenth-century priory.

== See also ==
- Communes of the Cher department
