= Dutens =

Dutens is a French surname. Notable people with the surname include:

- Joseph Dutens (1765–1848), French engineer and political economist, nephew of Louis
- Louis Dutens (1730–1812), French writer who mostly worked in or for Britain
