= Dun-sur-Auron =

- Commune
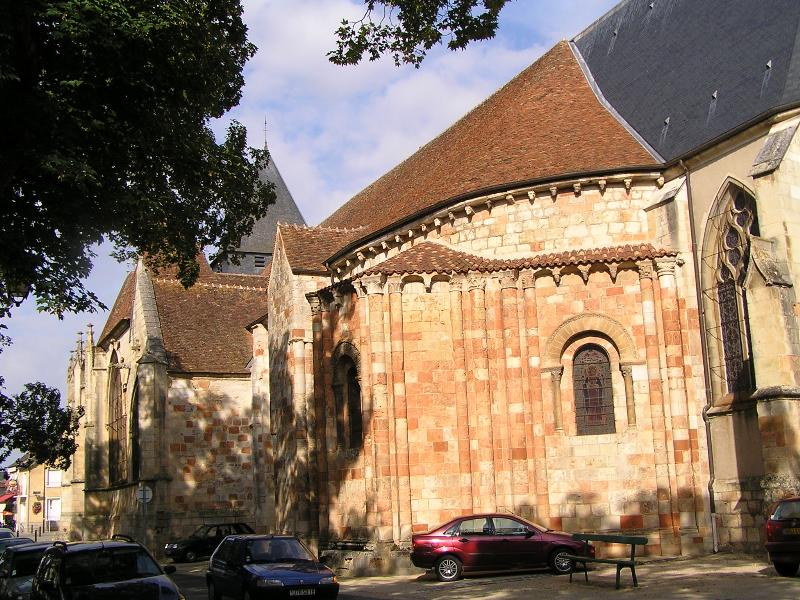
- The church in Dun-sur-Auron

- Coat of arms
- Location of Dun-sur-Auron
- Location within France Location within Centre-Val de Loire
- Coordinates: 46°53′08″N 2°34′21″E
- Country: France
- Region: Centre-Val de Loire
- Department: Cher
- Arrondissement: Saint-Amand-Montrond
- Canton: Dun-sur-Auron
- Intercommunality: CC Le Dunois

Government
  - Mayor (2020–2026): Louis Cosyns
- Area^{1}: 50.09 km^{2} (19.34 sq mi)
- Elevation: 174 m (571 ft)
- Highest elevation: 188 m (617 ft)
- Lowest elevation: 151 m (495 ft)
- Population (2023): 3,524
  - Density: 70.35/km^{2} (182.2/sq mi)
- Time zone: UTC+01:00 (CET)
  - Summer (DST): UTC+02:00 (CEST)
- INSEE/Postal code: 18087 /18130
- ^{1} French Land Register data, which excludes lakes, ponds, glaciers > 1 km^{2} (0.386 sq mi or 247 acres) and river estuaries.

Dun-sur-Auron (French pronunciation: [dœ̃ syʁ oʁɔ̃], literally Dun on Auron) is a commune in the Cher department in the Centre-Val de Loire region of France.

== Geography ==
A farming area comprising a small town and a couple of hamlets situated by the banks of both the Auron and the canal de Berry some 26 miles (42 km) east of Bourges at the junction of the D10, D14, D28, D34 and the D943 roads. Another small river, the Airain flows northwest through the northern part of the commune.

== Population ==
Historical population
Year	Pop.	±% p.a.
1968	3,995	—
1975	4,154	+0.56%
1982	4,238	+0.29%
1990	4,261	+0.07%
1999	4,013	−0.66%
2007	3,881	−0.42%
2012	4,293	+2.04%
2017	3,844	−2.19%
2023	3,524	−1.44%
Source: INSEE

== History ==
Dun-sur-Auron dates back from Dunum, a Gaul fortified place. In the Middle Ages it depended from the Viscount of Bourges. In 1101, the last viscount, Eudes Arpin, lord of Dun, sold his estates to King Philip I of France and the city was renamed Dun-le-Roi.

== Sights ==
- The sixteenth-century town walls
- The twelfth-century church of St. Etienne.
- Fifteenth-century houses.
- A feudal motte castle.
- The chateau of La Périsse.
- The belltower.
- A museum.
- "Le Prieuré", built late 1400, Place Bourbon.
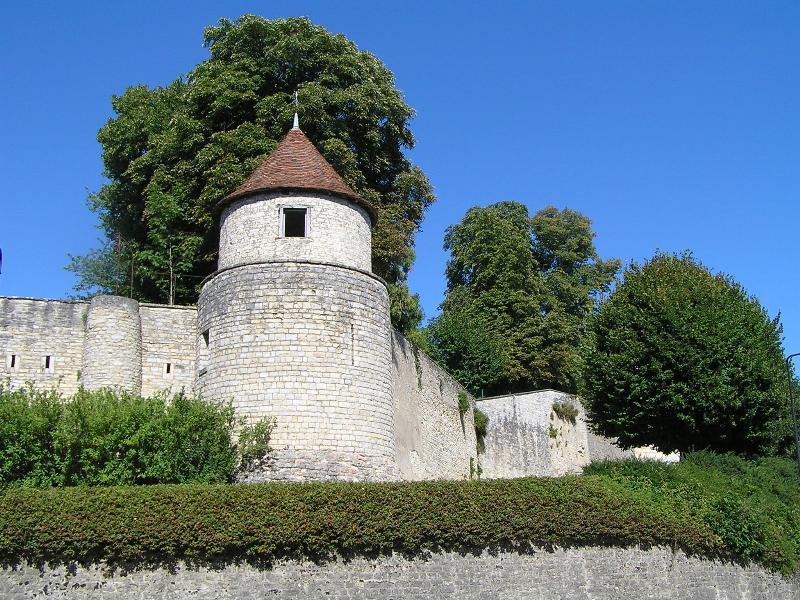
Walls and towers

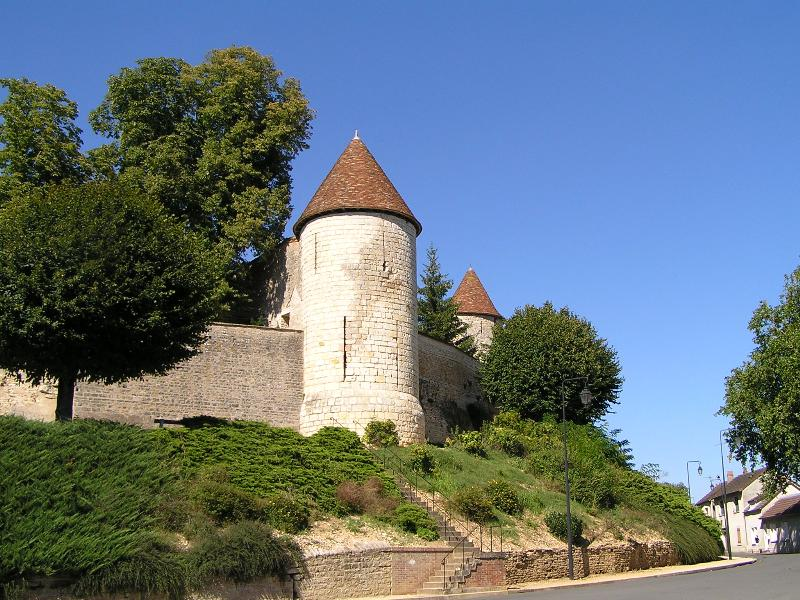
Fortifications

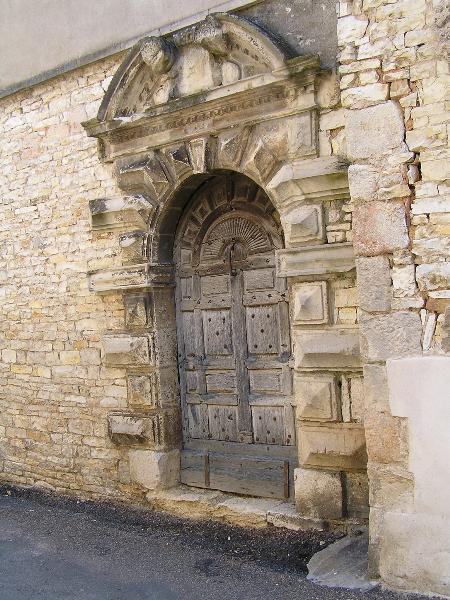
A gateway in the walls
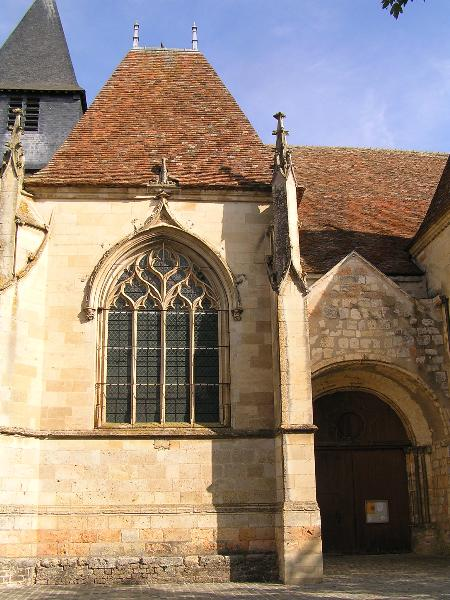
The church entrance

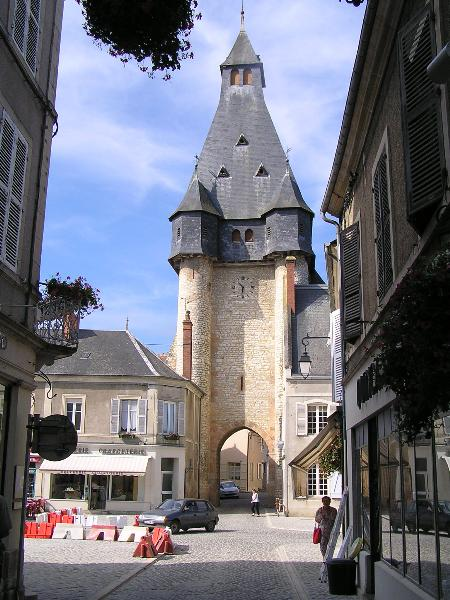
The bell tower

== Personalities ==
- Maurice Bardèche (1907–1998), journalist and writer.
- Érick Jacquin (1964–Present), chef and TV personality.
- Auguste Marie (1865-1934), Psychiatrist.

== See also ==
- Communes of the Cher department
