= Lantan =

Lantan may refer to:

- Lantan Lake, meaning Orchid Lake or formerly called Hong-Mao Pei, is located in eastern Chiayi City, Taiwan
- Lantan (Forgotten Realms), a grouping of islands in the fictional Island Kingdoms of Faerûn
- Lantan, Cher, a commune of the Cher département in France
- Lantan, a hill tribe that live in Louang Namtha province, northwestern Laos and Yunnan province, China
