= Parnay =

Parnay may refer to the following places in France:

- Parnay, Cher, a commune in the department of Cher
- Parnay, Maine-et-Loire, a commune in the department of Maine-et-Loire
