= Parnay, Cher =

Parnay
- Commune
- Location of Parnay
- Location within France Location within Centre-Val de Loire
- Coordinates: 46°50′58″N 2°34′18″E
- Country: France
- Region: Centre-Val de Loire
- Department: Cher
- Arrondissement: Saint-Amand-Montrond
- Canton: Dun-sur-Auron
- Intercommunality: CC Le Dunois

Government
  - Mayor (2020–2026): Xavier Crépin
- Area^{1}: 17.28 km^{2} (6.67 sq mi)
- Elevation: 163 m (535 ft)
- Highest elevation: 181 m (594 ft)
- Lowest elevation: 159 m (522 ft)
- Population (2023): 49
  - Density: 2.8/km^{2} (7.3/sq mi)
- Time zone: UTC+01:00 (CET)
  - Summer (DST): UTC+02:00 (CEST)
- INSEE/Postal code: 18177 /18130
- ^{1} French Land Register data, which excludes lakes, ponds, glaciers > 1 km^{2} (0.386 sq mi or 247 acres) and river estuaries.

Parnay (French pronunciation: [paʁnɛ]) is a commune in the Cher department in the Centre-Val de Loire region of France.

== Geography ==
A very small farming and forestry village and one hamlet situated some 21 miles (34 km) southeast of Bourges, at the junction of the D10 with the D120 road. The commune is bordered to the east by the river Auron and the canal de Berry.

== Population ==
Historical population
| Year | Pop. | ±% p.a. |
|---|---|---|
| 1968 | 79 | — |
| 1975 | 49 | −6.60% |
| 1982 | 30 | −6.77% |
| 1990 | 34 | +1.58% |
| 1999 | 48 | +3.91% |
| 2007 | 62 | +3.25% |
| 2012 | 47 | −5.39% |
| 2017 | 64 | +6.37% |
| 2023 | 49 | −4.35% |
Source: INSEE

== Sights ==
- The church of St. Fiacre, dating from the nineteenth century.
- The ruins of a thirteenth-century chateau at Bois-Buart.
- The ruins of a priory.
- Two stone crosses, one listed as a historic site.

== See also ==
- Communes of the Cher department
