= Saint-Denis-de-Palin =

- Commune
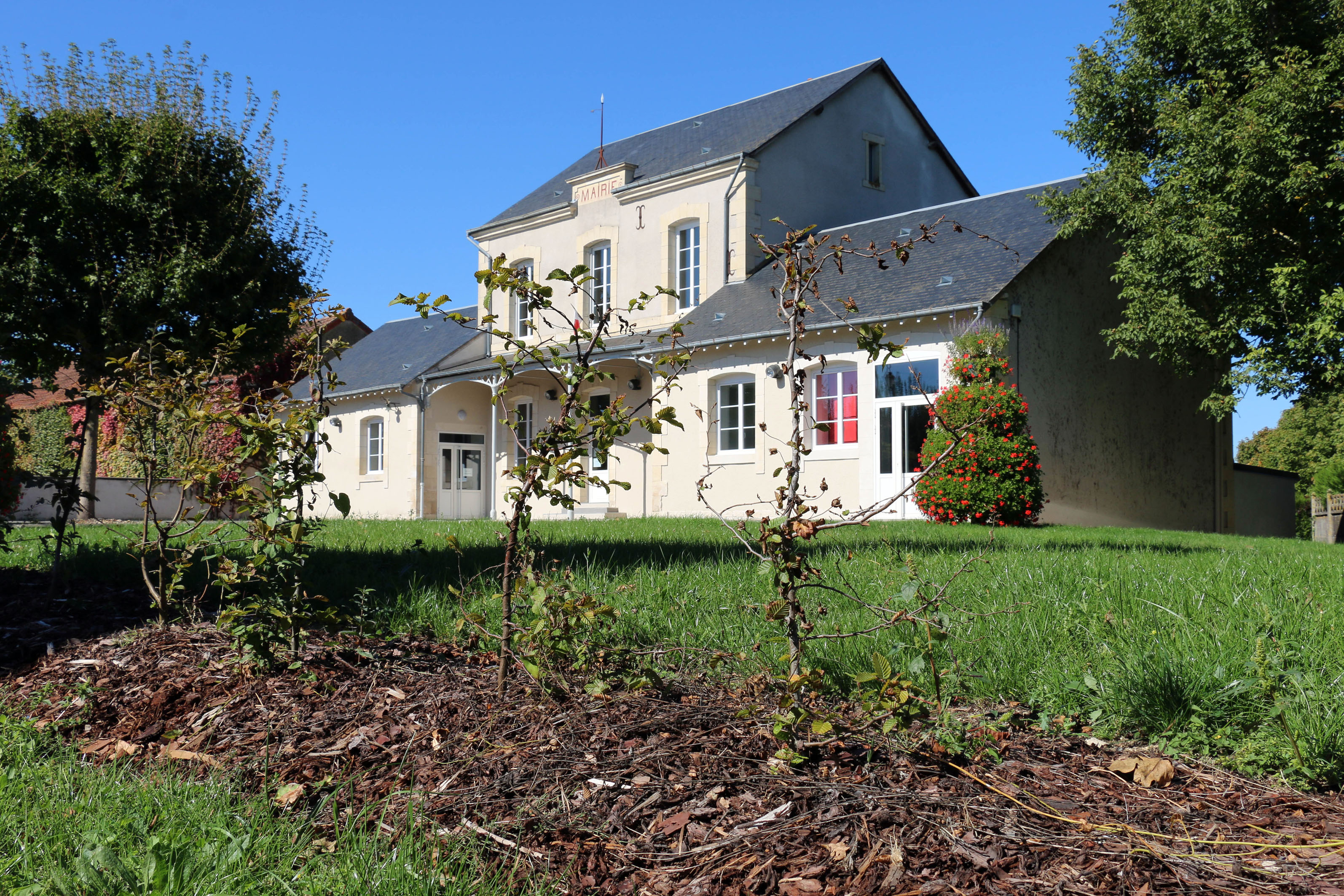
- Town hall
- Location of Saint-Denis-de-Palin
- Location within France Location within Centre-Val de Loire
- Coordinates: 46°56′26″N 2°32′22″E
- Country: France
- Region: Centre-Val de Loire
- Department: Cher
- Arrondissement: Saint-Amand-Montrond
- Canton: Dun-sur-Auron
- Intercommunality: CC Le Dunois

Government
  - Mayor (2020–2026): Jean-Michel Bertaux
- Area^{1}: 30.51 km^{2} (11.78 sq mi)
- Elevation: 150 m (490 ft)
- Highest elevation: 184 m (604 ft)
- Lowest elevation: 142 m (466 ft)
- Population (2023): 274
  - Density: 8.98/km^{2} (23.3/sq mi)
- Time zone: UTC+01:00 (CET)
  - Summer (DST): UTC+02:00 (CEST)
- INSEE/Postal code: 18204 /18130
- ^{1} French Land Register data, which excludes lakes, ponds, glaciers > 1 km^{2} (0.386 sq mi or 247 acres) and river estuaries.

Saint-Denis-de-Palin (French pronunciation: [sɛ̃ dəni də palɛ̃]) is a commune in the Cher department in the Centre-Val de Loire region of France.

== Geography ==
An area of lakes, streams and farming comprising the village and several hamlets situated on the banks of the river Auron, about 12 miles (19 km) southeast of Bourges on the D132 road at its junction with the D106 and the D953 roads.

== Population ==
Historical population
Year	Pop.	±% p.a.
1968	354	—
1975	314	−1.70%
1982	327	+0.58%
1990	374	+1.69%
1999	339	−1.09%
2007	335	−0.15%
2012	344	+0.53%
2017	302	−2.57%
2023	274	−1.61%
Source: INSEE

== Sights ==
- The church of St. Denis, dating from the twelfth century
- The eighteenth-century chateau
- A feudal motte
- Evidence of Roman occupation

== See also ==
- Communes of the Cher department
