= Cogny =

Cogny may refer to the following places in France:

- Cogny, Cher, a commune in the department of Cher
- Cogny, Rhône, a commune in the department of Rhône

== See also ==
- René Cogny (1904–1968) French general
