= Saint-Germain-des-Bois, Cher =

Saint-Germain-des-Bois
- Commune
- Location of Saint-Germain-des-Bois
- Location within France Location within Centre-Val de Loire
- Coordinates: 46°54′50″N 2°26′39″E
- Country: France
- Region: Centre-Val de Loire
- Department: Cher
- Arrondissement: Saint-Amand-Montrond
- Canton: Dun-sur-Auron
- Intercommunality: CC Le Dunois

Government
  - Mayor (2020–2026): Étienne Durand
- Area^{1}: 29 km^{2} (11 sq mi)
- Elevation: 163 m (535 ft)
- Highest elevation: 184 m (604 ft)
- Lowest elevation: 162 m (531 ft)
- Population (2023): 587
  - Density: 20/km^{2} (52/sq mi)
- Time zone: UTC+01:00 (CET)
  - Summer (DST): UTC+02:00 (CEST)
- INSEE/Postal code: 18212 /18340
- ^{1} French Land Register data, which excludes lakes, ponds, glaciers > 1 km^{2} (0.386 sq mi or 247 acres) and river estuaries.

Saint-Germain-des-Bois (French pronunciation: [sɛ̃ ʒɛʁmɛ̃ de bwa]) is a commune in the Cher department in the Centre-Val de Loire region of France.

== Geography ==
A farming area comprising the village and a couple of hamlets situated about 13 miles (21 km) south of Bourges at the junction of the D28 and the D132 roads. The A71 autoroute passes through the northwestern part of the commune.

== Population ==
Historical population
Year	Pop.	±% p.a.
1968	515	—
1975	545	+0.81%
1982	557	+0.31%
1990	594	+0.81%
1999	547	−0.91%
2007	572	+0.56%
2012	607	+1.19%
2017	628	+0.68%
2023	587	−1.12%
Source: INSEE

== Sights ==
- The church of St. Germain, dating from the twelfth century.
- Traces of a Roman road.
- Two neolithic menhirs.

== See also ==
- Communes of the Cher department
