= Joseph Dutens =

Joseph-Michel Dutens (15 October 1765 in Tours, France – 6 August 1848) was a French engineer and political economist.

He was a nephew of the writer Louis Dutens.

He worked as a designer on the La Tranchasse Canal Bridge, and as an engineer on the Berry Canal in 1841.

== Works ==
- Philosophie de l'économle politique (Paris 1835, 2 volumes)
