= Chalivoy-Milon =

- Commune
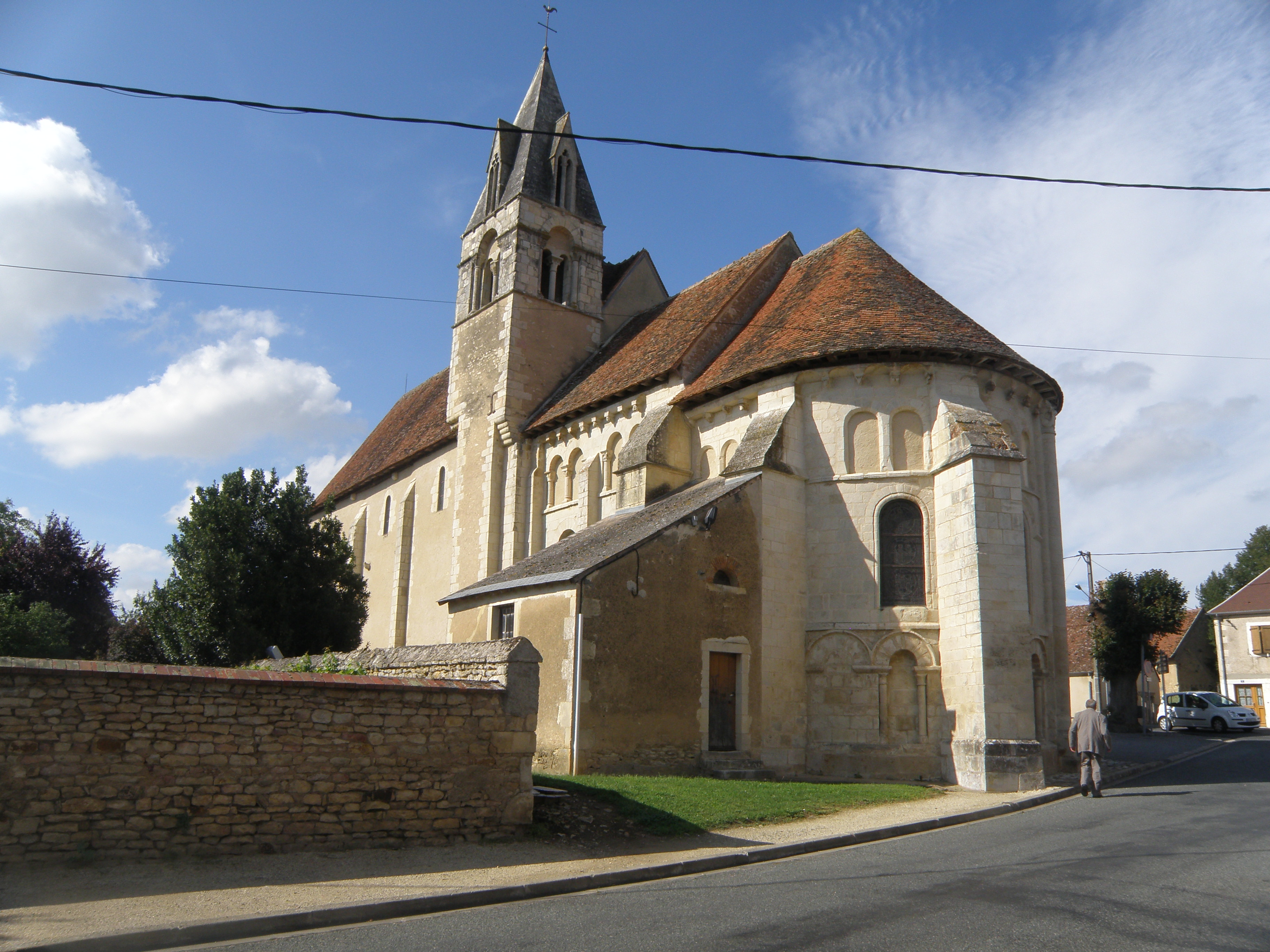
- The church in Chalivoy-Milon
- Location of Chalivoy-Milon
- Location within France Location within Centre-Val de Loire
- Coordinates: 46°51′37″N 2°42′23″E
- Country: France
- Region: Centre-Val de Loire
- Department: Cher
- Arrondissement: Saint-Amand-Montrond
- Canton: Dun-sur-Auron
- Intercommunality: CC Le Dunois

Government
  - Mayor (2020–2026): Laurence Janvier
- Area^{1}: 19.61 km^{2} (7.57 sq mi)
- Elevation: 216 m (709 ft)
- Highest elevation: 249 m (817 ft)
- Lowest elevation: 165 m (541 ft)
- Population (2023): 388
  - Density: 19.8/km^{2} (51.2/sq mi)
- Time zone: UTC+01:00 (CET)
  - Summer (DST): UTC+02:00 (CEST)
- INSEE/Postal code: 18045 /18130
- ^{1} French Land Register data, which excludes lakes, ponds, glaciers > 1 km^{2} (0.386 sq mi or 247 acres) and river estuaries.

Chalivoy-Milon (French pronunciation: [ʃalivwa milɔ̃]) is a commune in the Cher department in the Centre-Val de Loire region of France.

== Geography ==
An area of forestry and farming comprising the village and several hamlets some 20 miles (32 km) southeast of Bourges at the junction of the D34 with the D6 road.

== Population ==
Historical population
| Year | Pop. | ±% p.a. |
|---|---|---|
| 1968 | 471 | — |
| 1975 | 520 | +1.42% |
| 1982 | 504 | −0.45% |
| 1990 | 481 | −0.58% |
| 1999 | 461 | −0.47% |
| 2007 | 405 | −1.61% |
| 2012 | 476 | +3.28% |
| 2017 | 431 | −1.97% |
| 2023 | 388 | −1.74% |
Source: INSEE

== Sights ==
- The church of St. Martin, dating from the twelfth century
- The fourteenth-century castle of Yssertieux
- Ancient houses

== See also ==
- Communes of the Cher department
