= Vernais =

- Commune
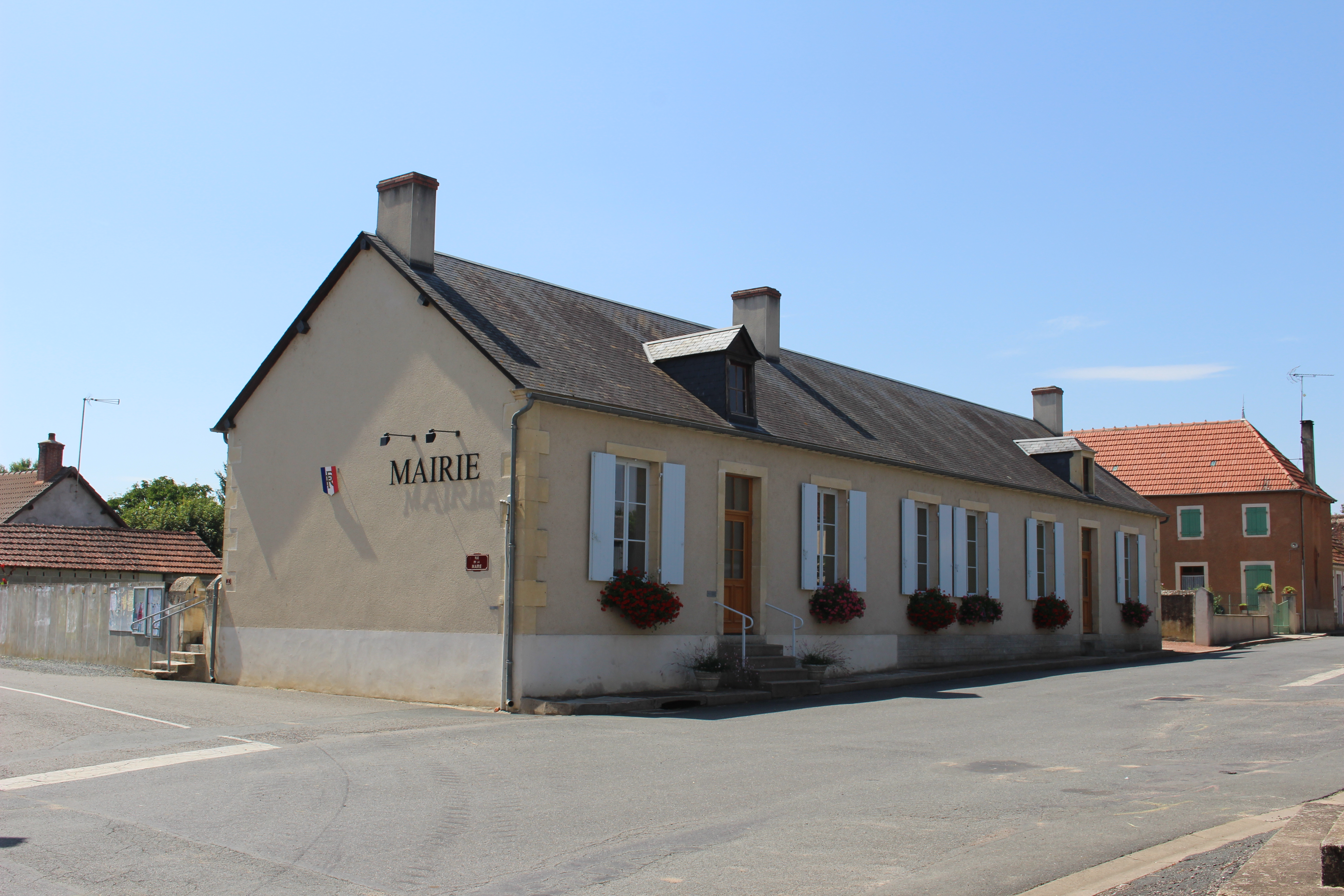
- Town hall
- Location of Vernais
- Location within France Location within Centre-Val de Loire
- Coordinates: 46°45′59″N 2°42′53″E
- Country: France
- Region: Centre-Val de Loire
- Department: Cher
- Arrondissement: Saint-Amand-Montrond
- Canton: Dun-sur-Auron
- Intercommunality: CC Cœur de France

Government
  - Mayor (2020–2026): Charles Adolph
- Area^{1}: 25.84 km^{2} (9.98 sq mi)
- Elevation: 189 m (620 ft)
- Highest elevation: 222 m (728 ft)
- Lowest elevation: 170 m (560 ft)
- Population (2023): 179
  - Density: 6.93/km^{2} (17.9/sq mi)
- Time zone: UTC+01:00 (CET)
  - Summer (DST): UTC+02:00 (CEST)
- INSEE/Postal code: 18276 /18210
- ^{1} French Land Register data, which excludes lakes, ponds, glaciers > 1 km^{2} (0.386 sq mi or 247 acres) and river estuaries.

Vernais (French pronunciation: [vɛʁnɛ]) is a commune in the Cher department in the Centre-Val de Loire region of France.

== Geography ==
A forestry and farming village and a hamlet situated on the banks of the canal de Berry, about 22 miles (35 km) southeast of Bourges at the junction of the D76 and the D175 road. The river Auron forms part of the commune’s northern boundary and the Marmande a small part of its southern boundary.

== Population ==
Historical population
Year	Pop.	±% p.a.
1968	294	—
1975	296	+0.10%
1982	280	−0.79%
1990	255	−1.16%
1999	232	−1.04%
2007	219	−0.72%
2012	216	−0.28%
2017	193	−2.23%
2023	179	−1.25%
Source: INSEE

== Sights ==
- The church of Notre-Dame, dating from the twelfth century.

== See also ==
- Communes of the Cher department
