= Canton of Dun-sur-Auron =

Coordinates: 46°53′8″N 2°34′21″E

Dun-sur-Auron
- Canton
- Interactive map of Dun-sur-Auron
- Country: France
- Region: Centre-Val de Loire
- Department: Cher
- No. of communes: {{{nbcomm}}}
- Area: 782.13 km^{2} (301.98 sq mi)
- Population (2023): 14,471
  - Density: 18.502/km^{2} (47.920/sq mi)
- INSEE code: 18 09

The Canton of Dun-sur-Auron is a canton situated in the Cher département and in the Centre-Val de Loire region of France.

== Geography ==
A farming area in the valley of the river Auron, in the northern part of the arrondissement of Saint-Amand-Montrond centred on the town of Dun-sur-Auron. The altitude varies from 142m at Saint-Denis-de-Palin to 249m at Chalivoy-Milon, with an average altitude of 174m.

== Composition ==
At the French canton reorganisation which came into effect in March 2015, the canton was expanded from 12 to 32 communes:

- Arpheuilles
- Augy-sur-Aubois
- Bannegon
- Bessais-le-Fromental
- Bussy
- Chalivoy-Milon
- Charenton-du-Cher
- Chaumont
- Cogny
- Contres
- Coust
- Dun-sur-Auron
- Givardon
- Grossouvre
- Lantan
- Mornay-sur-Allier
- Neuilly-en-Dun
- Neuvy-le-Barrois
- Osmery
- Parnay
- Le Pondy
- Raymond
- Sagonne
- Saint-Aignan-des-Noyers
- Saint-Denis-de-Palin
- Saint-Germain-des-Bois
- Saint-Pierre-les-Étieux
- Sancoins
- Thaumiers
- Vereaux
- Vernais
- Verneuil

== Population ==
Historical population
Year	Pop.	±% p.a.
2013	16,034	—
2018	15,135	−1.15%
Source: INSEE

== See also ==
- Arrondissements of the Cher department
- Cantons of the Cher department
- Communes of the Cher department
