= Bussy, Cher =

Bussy
- Commune
- Location of Bussy
- Location within France Location within Centre-Val de Loire
- Coordinates: 46°54′15″N 2°37′19″E
- Country: France
- Region: Centre-Val de Loire
- Department: Cher
- Arrondissement: Saint-Amand-Montrond
- Canton: Dun-sur-Auron
- Intercommunality: CC Le Dunois

Government
  - Mayor (2020–2026): Marsey de Chat
- Area^{1}: 26.69 km^{2} (10.31 sq mi)
- Elevation: 178 m (584 ft)
- Highest elevation: 201 m (659 ft)
- Lowest elevation: 160 m (520 ft)
- Population (2023): 354
  - Density: 13.3/km^{2} (34.4/sq mi)
- Time zone: UTC+01:00 (CET)
  - Summer (DST): UTC+02:00 (CEST)
- INSEE/Postal code: 18040 /18130
- ^{1} French Land Register data, which excludes lakes, ponds, glaciers > 1 km^{2} (0.386 sq mi or 247 acres) and river estuaries.

Bussy (French pronunciation: [bysi]) is a commune in the Cher department in the Centre-Val de Loire region of France.

== Geography ==
An area of forestry and farming comprising the village and several hamlets some 15 miles (24 km) southeast of Bourges at the junction of the D34e with the D10 and D36 roads.

The river Airain flows northwest through the northern part of the commune

== Population ==
Historical population
Year	Pop.	±% p.a.
1968	606	—
1975	508	−2.49%
1982	453	−1.62%
1990	436	−0.48%
1999	366	−1.93%
2007	368	+0.07%
2012	361	−0.38%
2017	380	+1.03%
2023	354	−1.17%
Source: INSEE

== Sights ==
- The church of Saints Peter and Paul, dating from the twelfth century.
- Traces of the 12th-century château.
- A feudal motte.
- Evidence of a Roman road and aqueduct.

== See also ==
- Communes of the Cher department
