= Communauté de communes Le Dunois =

Federation of municipalities in Centre-Val de Loire, France

Le Dunois
- Communauté de communes
- Country: France
- Region: Centre-Val de Loire
- Department: Cher
- No. of communes: {{{nbcomm}}}
- Established: 2001

Government
  - President: Louis Cosyns
- Area: 335.65 km^{2} (129.60 sq mi)
- Population (2018): 7,507
  - Density: 22.37/km^{2} (57.93/sq mi)

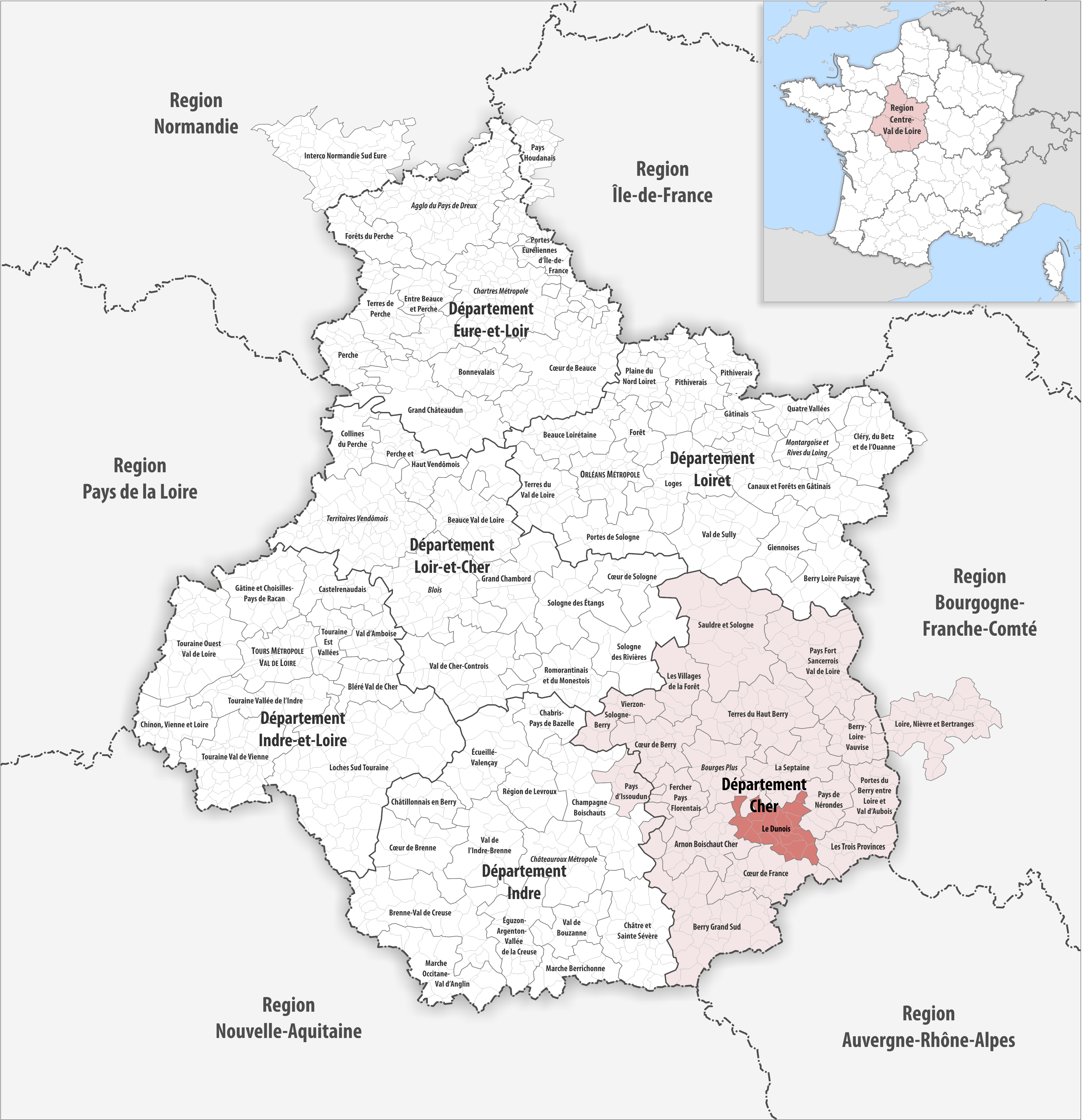
Le Dunois Municipal Association

The communauté de communes Le Dunois is located in the Cher département of the Centre-Val de Loire region of France. It was created in January 2001. Its seat is Dun-sur-Auron. Its area is 335.7 km^{2}, and its population was 7,507 in 2018.

== Composition ==
The communauté de communes consists of the following 16 communes:

1. Bannegon
2. Bussy
3. Chalivoy-Milon
4. Cogny
5. Contres
6. Dun-sur-Auron
7. Lantan
8. Le Pondy
9. Osmery
10. Parnay
11. Raymond
12. Saint-Denis-de-Palin
13. Saint-Germain-des-Bois
14. Senneçay
15. Thaumiers
16. Verneuil
