= Raymond, Cher =

Raymond
- Commune
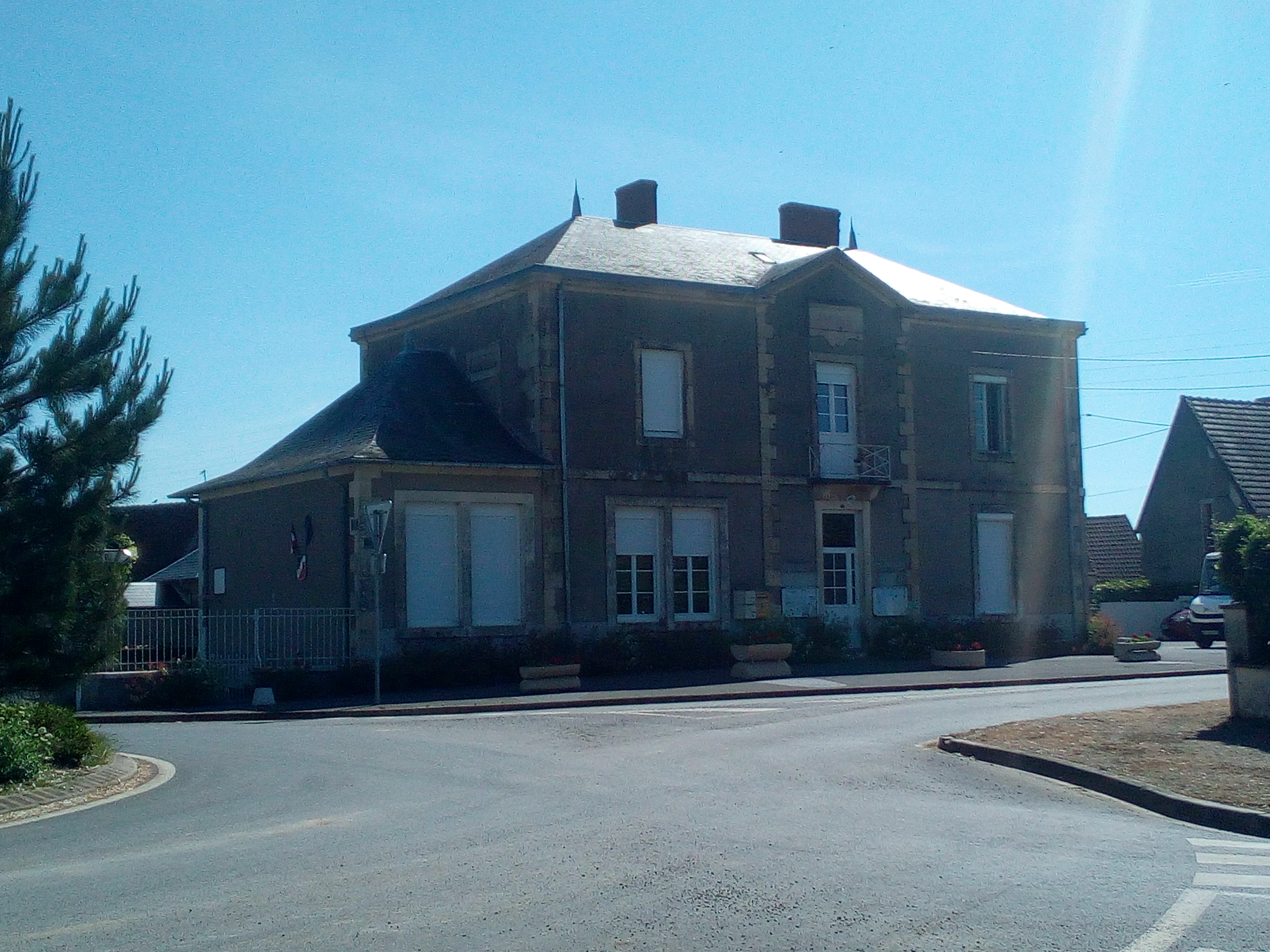
- The town hall in Raymond
- Location of Raymond
- Location within France Location within Centre-Val de Loire
- Coordinates: 46°58′19″N 2°41′13″E
- Country: France
- Region: Centre-Val de Loire
- Department: Cher
- Arrondissement: Saint-Amand-Montrond
- Canton: Dun-sur-Auron
- Intercommunality: CC Le Dunois

Government
  - Mayor (2020–2026): René Rasle
- Area^{1}: 9.24 km^{2} (3.57 sq mi)
- Elevation: 184 m (604 ft)
- Highest elevation: 200 m (660 ft)
- Lowest elevation: 177 m (581 ft)
- Population (2023): 172
  - Density: 18.6/km^{2} (48.2/sq mi)
- Time zone: UTC+01:00 (CET)
  - Summer (DST): UTC+02:00 (CEST)
- INSEE/Postal code: 18191 /18130
- ^{1} French Land Register data, which excludes lakes, ponds, glaciers > 1 km^{2} (0.386 sq mi or 247 acres) and river estuaries.

Raymond (French pronunciation: [ʁɛmɔ̃]) is a commune in the Cher department in the Centre-Val de Loire region of France. Its inhabitants are known as Raymondois.

== Geography ==
A farming area comprising the village and two hamlets situated on the banks of the small river Bertoire, about 18 miles (29 km) southeast of Bourges, at the junction of the D10 with the D15 and D91 roads.

== Population ==
Historical population
Year	Pop.	±% p.a.
1968	199	—
1975	173	−1.98%
1982	177	+0.33%
1990	162	−1.10%
1999	156	−0.42%
2007	199	+3.09%
2012	217	+1.75%
2017	199	−1.72%
2023	172	−2.40%
Source: INSEE

== Sights ==
- The romanesque church of St. Loup, rebuilt in the nineteenth century.

== See also ==
- Communes of the Cher department
