= Contres, Cher =

Contres
- Commune
- Location of Contres
- Location within France Location within Centre-Val de Loire
- Coordinates: 46°52′08″N 2°29′24″E
- Country: France
- Region: Centre-Val de Loire
- Department: Cher
- Arrondissement: Saint-Amand-Montrond
- Canton: Dun-sur-Auron
- Intercommunality: CC Le Dunois

Government
  - Mayor (2024–2026): Rémi Bourret
- Area^{1}: 16.03 km^{2} (6.19 sq mi)
- Elevation: 172 m (564 ft)
- Highest elevation: 175 m (574 ft)
- Lowest elevation: 160 m (520 ft)
- Population (2023): 35
  - Density: 2.2/km^{2} (5.7/sq mi)
- Time zone: UTC+01:00 (CET)
  - Summer (DST): UTC+02:00 (CEST)
- INSEE/Postal code: 18071 /18130
- ^{1} French Land Register data, which excludes lakes, ponds, glaciers > 1 km^{2} (0.386 sq mi or 247 acres) and river estuaries.

Contres (French pronunciation: [kɔ̃tʁ]) is a commune in the Cher department in the Centre-Val de Loire region of France.

== Geography ==
One of the smallest communes in all of France, by population, this farming and forestry village is situated some 15 miles (24 km) south of Bourges on the D14 road.

== Population ==
Historical population
Year	Pop.	±% p.a.
1968	56	—
1975	26	−10.38%
1982	21	−3.00%
1990	28	+3.66%
1999	31	+1.14%
2007	29	−0.83%
2012	35	+3.83%
2017	32	−1.78%
2023	35	+1.50%
Source: INSEE

== Sights ==
- The decommissioned church of St. Christophe, dating from the twelfth century.
- Biscuiterie Saint-Michel is based in Contres.

== See also ==
- Communes of the Cher department
