= Auguste Marie =

French psychiatrist

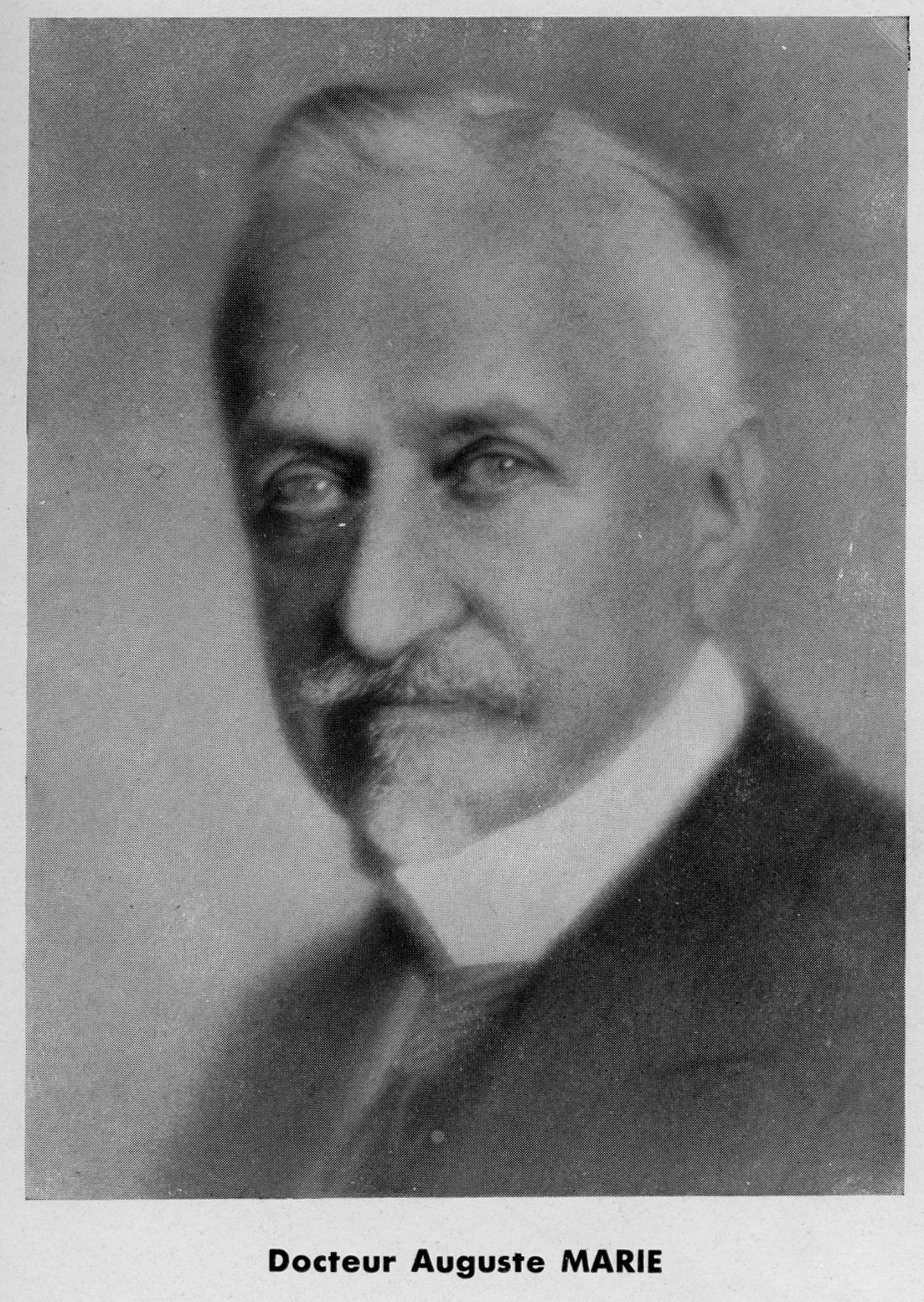
- Dr Auguste Marie in 1934
- Born: 16 February 1865; Voiron
- Died: 29 July 1934 (aged 69)
- Occupation: Medical doctor
- Awards: Chevalier of the Legion of Honour (1903)

Auguste Marie, born Auguste Armand Victor Marie on February 16, 1865, was a French psychiatrist. He is known for founding the "family colony" at Dun-sur-Auron, a village where former asylum inmates were housed by foster families who were paid to take care of them. He is also known for his collection, studies and exhibits of the art created by his patients. He was mayor of the town of Orly from 1920 until his death on July 29, 1934.

== Early life ==
Auguste Marie was born on February 16, 1865, in the town of Voiron in southeastern France. He was the son of Auguste-André Marie, a violin teacher, and his wife Joséphine Girod, a piano teacher.

Auguste Marie studied both medicine and law, completing his law degree in 1886 and becoming a member of the bar. He was first in his class of medical residents of the hospitals in Grenoble. He moved to Paris in order to work under Gustave Bouchereau at the Sainte-Anne hospital, a psychiatric hospital in Paris.

Marie was disgusted by the dismal and overcrowded conditions in the asylums and was convinced that they worsened the mental health of his patients. In addition, since he was an artist himself, he took an interest in the artistic production of psychiatric patients and he began to collect their works.

In the late 1880s, Gustave Bouchereau asked him to go to Scotland to study the open care systems that had existed in that country since the 1830s, thanks to the work of Robert Gardiner Hill and John Conolly. He also examined the Belgian experience of foster care for the mentally ill in Geel, Belgium, a town where the mentally ill had been placed in foster homes since the Middle Ages. The conclusion that Marie drew from his visit to Scotland and from the Belgian experience is that certain psychiatric patients who were cared for in well managed, more open systems could get better.

== Founding the family colony ==
Enthusiastic about his discoveries in Scotland and Belgium, he published a book in 1892 entitled Assistance for the Insane in France (L’assistance des aliénés en France). He was 26 years old. His timing was perfect because the book addressed directly the decades-old debate in France about the appalling conditions in the asylums, as well as the considerable expense they entailed. Between 1836 and 1860, the number of committed patients had nearly doubled in Paris, forcing the city to send some patients into the provinces.

After a virulent debate among medical professionals, public officials and the press, the département of the Seine (a now-disbanded, non-central government that represented Paris and surrounding regions until it was disbanded in 1968) tasked Auguste Marie with creating, on a trial basis, a 'family colony' to serve its psychiatric patients. The family colony was conceived as a foster care institution, wherein psychiatric patients who were considered ‘quiet’ and ‘safe’ were placed in the homes of foster families, who were to be paid a modest sum for taking care of them. With their care overseen by professionals, the patients lived in better conditions than in an asylum and had more freedom of movement. In addition to enhancing patient well-being, the goal was to relieve the asylums of the Seine département which were overcrowded and becoming a heavy financial burden.

The site of the experiment was to be the town of Dun-sur-Auron, 272 km south of Paris in the middle Loire valley. This town was chosen because of the poor economic situation of the region and the willingness of its citizens to participate. At that time, the département was in the throes of a serious economic crisis. The closure of its iron mines had thrown many miners out of work and phylloxera was killing the grape vines. Families in the region needed alternative sources of income (provision of foster care was remunerated) and it is for that reason that the local authorities welcomed Marie's initiative. The town would also to benefit from the construction of a new infirmary and employment offered by adapting the foster houses to patient needs.

In October 1892, Auguste Marie was named director of the newly founded colony and selected the first group of 100 patients to be enrolled in the new system. The first patients arrived in December 1892 and were exclusively older women suffering from some form of dementia or other intellectual disability. Marie moved to Dun-sur-Auron with his parents, where he would live for the next eight years.

The number of patients housed at Dun-sur-Auron increased from 500 in 1898 to 973 in 1911. The experience at Dun-sur-Auron was deemed sufficiently successful that the 'family colony' concept was extended. In 1896, one of the colony's secondary infirmaries in Ainay-le-Château was turned into another separately managed colony for male patients. This was followed by two more colonies: Lurcy-Lévy (Cher) in 1903 and Chezal-Benoit (Cher) in 1906.

Despite the relative success of these colonies, There were some unanticipated problems; notably that, once the patients were transferred from the asylum, nothing in their legal status prevented them from abandoning foster care or asserting control over their own financial affairs. These problems were considered to be largely resolved by the integration of the family colonies as a separate entity under an 1838 law governing the asylums.

In Dun-sur-Auron, Auguste Marie also married his wife, Daria Mirvoda, daughter of a Russian lawyer whom he had met at a congress. Their daughter Irène was born there.

== Villejuif asylum ==
In 1900, Auguste Marie left Dun-sur-Auron to take the post of psychiatrist at the Villejuif asylum, where he was the director of the men's section.

As a psychiatrist, Auguste Marie encouraged his patients to practice arts or crafts. At this time, he began to envisage the possibility of exhibiting their artwork, an idea he argued for in his 1905 article Le musée de la folie (The madness museum). Accordingly, he set up exhibition spaces in the attics of the hospital where his collections could be displayed, but this 'museum' was not open to the public.

As far as Marie was concerned, the goal of such a collection and exhibition was on one hand to bring back his patients to 'rational activity' and on the other hand to emphasize the sometimes arbitrary barrier between the 'insane' and the rest of humanity. He was fond of saying that the difference between insanity and sanity was partial and a matter of degree, not of essence. In this, he was opposed to Cesare Lombroso's vision on the subject of artistic creativity and genius.

Auguste Marie was almost killed by one of his patients in 1908. A patient entered his staff house on the asylum grounds in Villejuif and fired several bullets into his chest. However, his wounds were not fatal because a thick manuscript slowed down the bullets. He recalled this experience in 1911 in an article in which he explained the risks that psychiatric doctors took after his colleague Aimé Guinard was killed in similar circumstances. In this article he also presented a variety of objects built by patients "to either escape from or kill the people who were keeping them."

== World War I ==
In 1914, although he was far past the age of mandatory mobilisation, he volunteered in the army and became médecin-major for the 95th infantry regiment but his service was short : on September 26, he was wounded in the forest of Apremont and was evacuated from the frontline. For the remainder of the war he was a military physician, first at the Allies Hospital on the Arago boulevard in Paris and then at the army's laboratory from 1916 to 1918. For his military service, he received the Croix de Guerre.

== Sainte-Anne hospital ==
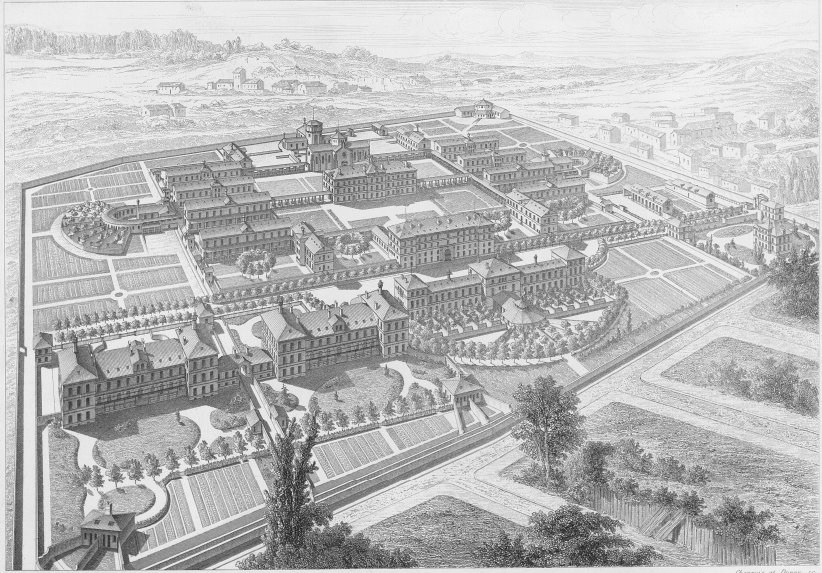
Representation of the Sainte-Anne asylum in 1877

After the war, Marie resumed work at Villejuif for two years. In 1920, he was named to a post at the Sainte-Anne Hospital Center – first, as medical director of outside consultation and as director of the men's section a year later.

He was among the first psychiatrists in France to experiment with malaria therapy, a method of curing neurosyphilis invented by Austrian physician Julius Wagner-Jauregg, for which he received the Nobel Prize in medicine. In malaria therapy, patients are deliberately infected with malarial parasites (Plasmodium) in order to induce fever, under the theory that an elevated body temperature cures the disease or reduces its symptoms. The patient then receives an antimalarial treatment such as quinine. A 2917 study of the treatment in a Dutch psychiatric hospital over the 1924-1954 period found that "well tolerated and Malaria Fever Treated patients had a significantly longer survival." Auguste Marie created a center of malaria therapy, the Centre d'impaludation at Sainte-Anne Hospital en 1923.

From 1926 to his retirement in 1929, Auguste Marie served as director of admissions at Sainte-Anne.

In 1927, thanks to a benefactor, the marquise de Ludre-Frolois, Auguste Marie was able to realize his goal of a museum with a first exhibition at the Vavin-Raspail gallery. Two years later, at the Max Bine gallery, he again organized an exhibition of artwork created by psychiatric patients. The exhibition showed works from the collections of the marquise, from that of Marie himself, but also from his colleagues, such as Joseph Rogues de Fursac. Some the works showed had been acquired by other collectors, notably André Breton.

== Retirement and service as an elected official ==
Marie retired from medical practice in 1929. He was elected mayor of the town of Orly en 1920. As a hygienist and member of the republican-Socialist Party, he worked on the electrification and installation of running water on the commune's territory, and founded a garden-city in 1927.

He was also elected as representative to the department's conseil général and extended his activities to the entire arrondissement that he represented.

== Death and legacy ==
Auguste Marie died on 29 July 1934. After he died, his art collection was divided. Thanks to Jean Dubuffet, a large part was donated in 1966 to the Collection de l'art brut in Lausanne.

Another part was added to the collections of the Art and History museum of the Sainte-Anne hospital.

== Works by Auguste Marie ==
- L'assistance des aliénés en Écosse, 1892
- La Démence, 1906
- Mysticisme et folie : étude de psychologie normale et pathologique comparées, 1907
- Traité International de Psychologie pathologique et de thérapeutique des maladies mentales en 3 tomes, 1910, 1911, 1912, Alcan
- La Réforme de l'assistance aux aliénés, 1928

== Bibliography ==
- Docteur Auguste Marie : (1865-1934) (in French). 1934. p. 21., recueil des oraisons funèbres prononcées à l'occasion de l'enterrement d'Auguste Marie.
- Rigondet, Juliette (2019), Un village pour aliénés tranquilles (in French), Fayard (published 15 May 2019), Rigondet2019, Wikidata Q124805304
- Philippe Dagen (2014). "Avant l'art brut, l'invention de l'art des fous, d'Auguste Marie à André Breton". ABCD-artbrut.net.
- Morehead, Allison (2010). "The Musee de la folie: Collecting and exhibiting chez les fous". Journal of the History of Collections. 23 (1): 101–126. doi:10.1093/jhc/fhq024.
- Couet, Lydia (6 February 2017). "Quand « l'art des fous » investit les galeries d'art dans les années vingt : « L'Exposition des artistes malades » à la galerie Max Bine (1929)". Revue TRANSVERSALES du Centre Georges Chevrier (10).
- Couet, Lydia (2019). Soigner la folie et collectionner 'l'art des fous' : l'art asilaire au XIXème siècle : archéologie de l'art brut (PhD thesis) (in French).
- Michel Caire. "(Armand Victor) Auguste Marie". Histoire de la psychiatrie. ISSN 2271-7315.
- Auguste Marie. "les dessins stéréotypés des malades mentaux (extrait du bulletin de la société clinique de médecine mentale de Paris". histoiredelafolie.fr.
- Christine Lamiable (1 July 2021). "La folle expérience des " colonies " d'aliénées". Causette.
- "Dun-sur-Auron, l'aventure psychiatrique d'un village français". Le Journal des Débats. 6 June 2019.
- Marie Derrien (January 2020). "Soigner les incurables ? L'expérience des colonie familiales et la réforme de l'assistance aux aliénés en France (1892-1939)". Revue d'histoire moderne & contemporaine (67–1): 24–43. doi:10.3917/rhmc.671.0024. ISBN 9782410017267. ISSN 0048-8003.
