= Thaumiers =

- Commune
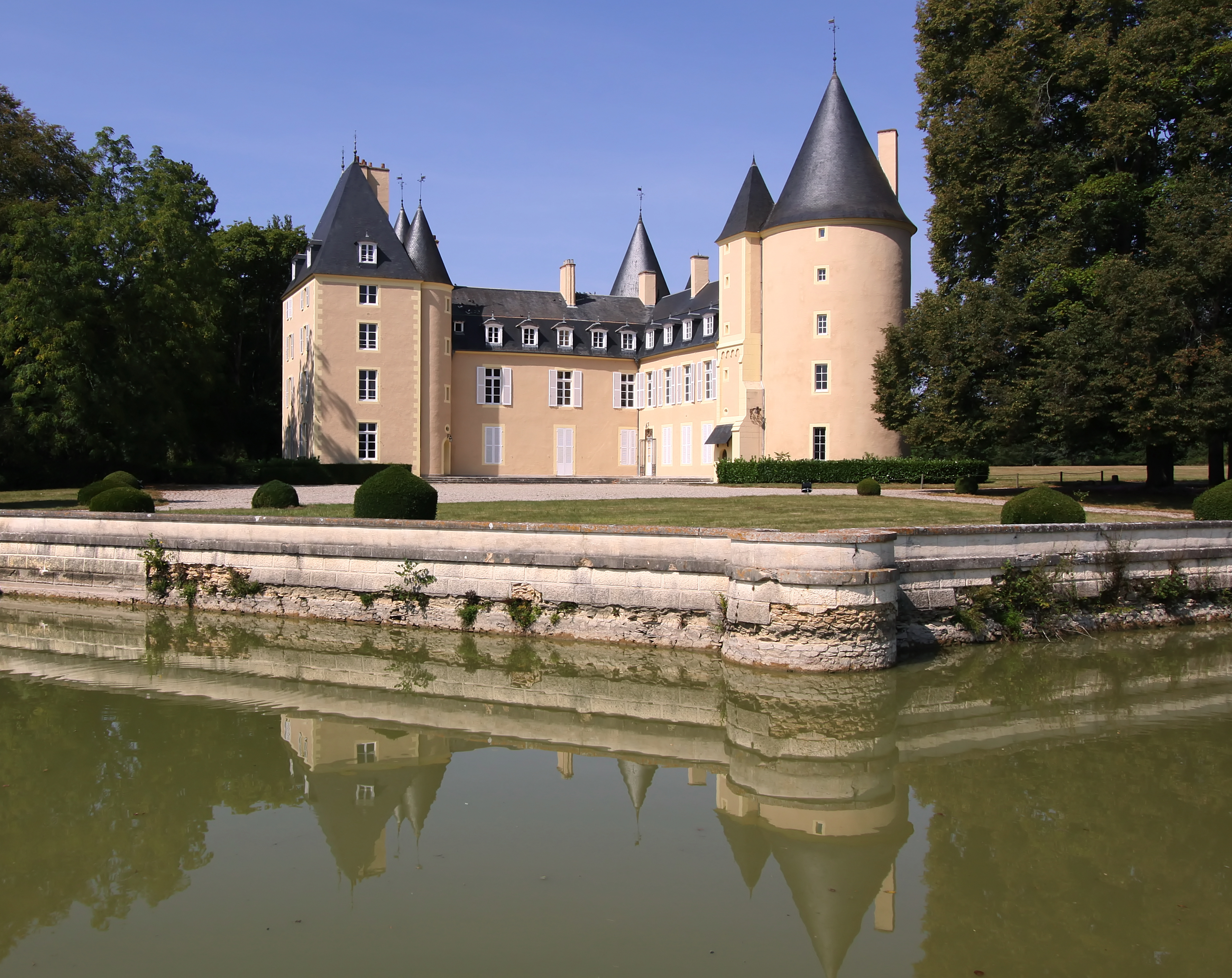
- The Château of La Forêt
- Location of Thaumiers
- Location within France Location within Centre-Val de Loire
- Coordinates: 46°49′20″N 2°39′21″E
- Country: France
- Region: Centre-Val de Loire
- Department: Cher
- Arrondissement: Saint-Amand-Montrond
- Canton: Dun-sur-Auron
- Intercommunality: CC Le Dunois

Government
  - Mayor (2020–2026): Francois Vincent
- Area^{1}: 27.33 km^{2} (10.55 sq mi)
- Elevation: 181 m (594 ft)
- Highest elevation: 236 m (774 ft)
- Lowest elevation: 165 m (541 ft)
- Population (2023): 387
  - Density: 14.2/km^{2} (36.7/sq mi)
- Time zone: UTC+01:00 (CET)
  - Summer (DST): UTC+02:00 (CEST)
- INSEE/Postal code: 18261 /18210
- ^{1} French Land Register data, which excludes lakes, ponds, glaciers > 1 km^{2} (0.386 sq mi or 247 acres) and river estuaries.

Thaumiers (French pronunciation: [tomje]) is a commune in the Cher department in the Centre-Val de Loire region of France.

== Geography ==
An area of forestry and farming comprising the village and several hamlets situated about 21 miles (34 km) southeast of Bourges at the junction of the D41 with the D92 and D943 roads. The river Auron forms the western and southern boundaries of the commune.

== Population ==
Historical population
Year	Pop.	±% p.a.
1968	512	—
1975	427	−2.56%
1982	397	−1.04%
1990	383	−0.45%
1999	382	−0.03%
2007	412	+0.95%
2012	415	+0.15%
2017	417	+0.10%
2023	387	−1.24%
Source: INSEE

== Sights ==
- The eighteenth-century chateau of Thaumiers.
- The church of St. Saturnin, dating from the twelfth century.
- Some Roman remains: walls, tombs, vases, sculptures and an aqueduct.
- The fifteenth-century chateau of La Forêt.
- Ruins of the priory of Grandmont at Fontguédon.

== See also ==
- Communes of the Cher department
