= Saint-Pierre-les-Étieux =

- Commune
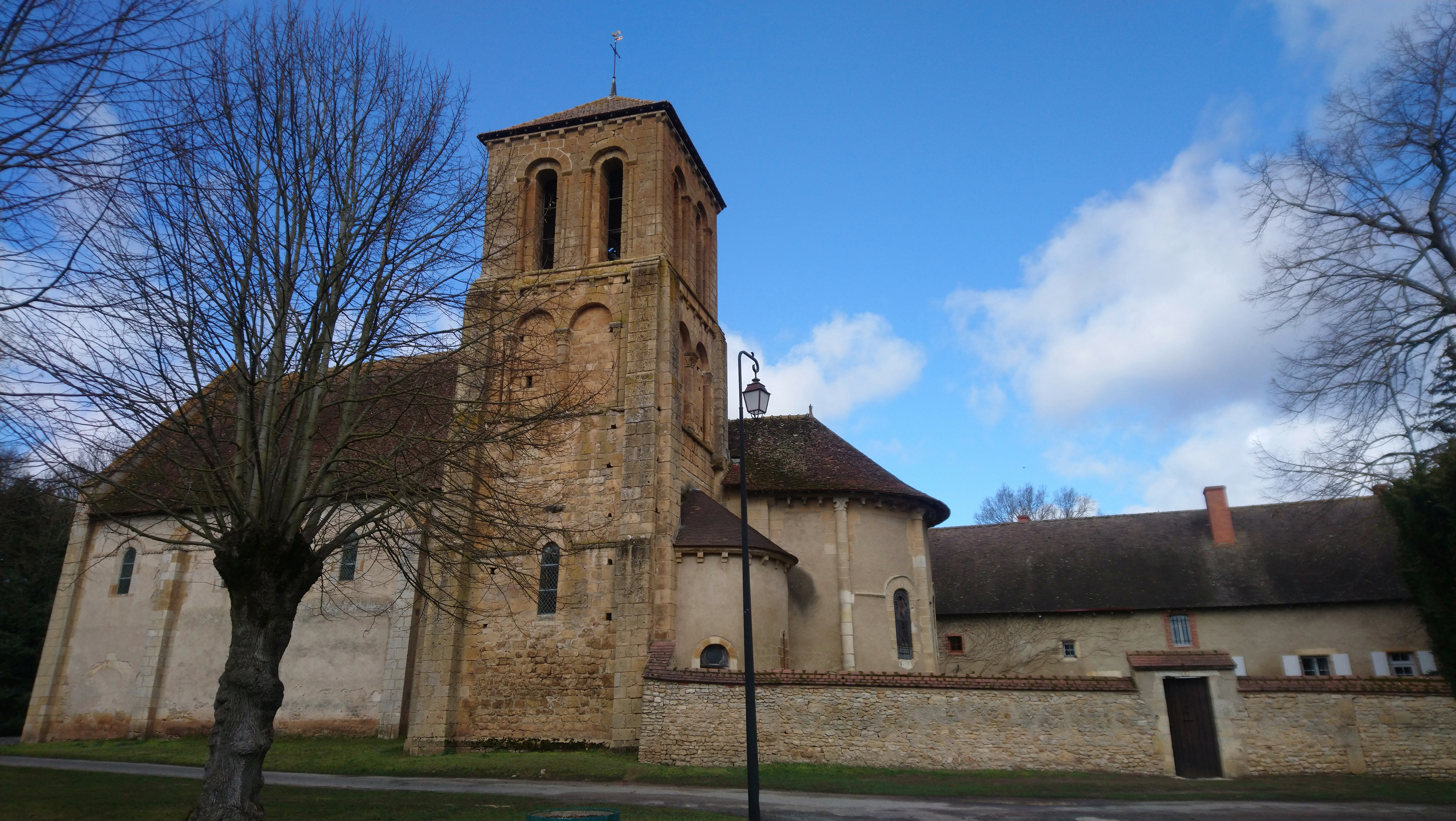
- The church of Saint-Pierre, in Saint-Pierre-les-Étieux

- Coat of arms
- Location of Saint-Pierre-les-Étieux
- Location within France Location within Centre-Val de Loire
- Coordinates: 46°44′20″N 2°35′40″E
- Country: France
- Region: Centre-Val de Loire
- Department: Cher
- Arrondissement: Saint-Amand-Montrond
- Canton: Dun-sur-Auron
- Intercommunality: CC Cœur de France

Government
  - Mayor (2021–2026): Gérard Marteau
- Area^{1}: 27.34 km^{2} (10.56 sq mi)
- Elevation: 180 m (590 ft)
- Highest elevation: 291 m (955 ft)
- Lowest elevation: 161 m (528 ft)
- Population (2023): 729
  - Density: 26.7/km^{2} (69.1/sq mi)
- Time zone: UTC+01:00 (CET)
  - Summer (DST): UTC+02:00 (CEST)
- INSEE/Postal code: 18231 /18210
- ^{1} French Land Register data, which excludes lakes, ponds, glaciers > 1 km^{2} (0.386 sq mi or 247 acres) and river estuaries.

Saint-Pierre-les-Étieux (French pronunciation: [sɛ̃ pjɛʁ le.z‿etjø]) is a commune in the Cher department in the Centre-Val de Loire region of France.

== Geography ==
A farming area comprising the village and several hamlets situated by the banks of the small river Marmande and the canal de Berry, about 28 miles (45 km) southeast of Bourges near the junction of the D136 with the D6 and D951 roads.

== Population ==
Historical population
Year	Pop.	±% p.a.
1968	833	—
1975	692	−2.61%
1982	636	−1.20%
1990	759	+2.23%
1999	791	+0.46%
2007	731	−0.98%
2012	725	−0.16%
2017	711	−0.39%
2023	729	+0.42%
Source: INSEE

== Sights ==
- The church of St. Pierre, dating from the twelfth century.
- A fifteenth-century manorhouse.
- Two eighteenth-century houses.
- An old stone cross.
- A watermill.

== See also ==
- Communes of the Cher department
