= Noyers-sur-Cher =

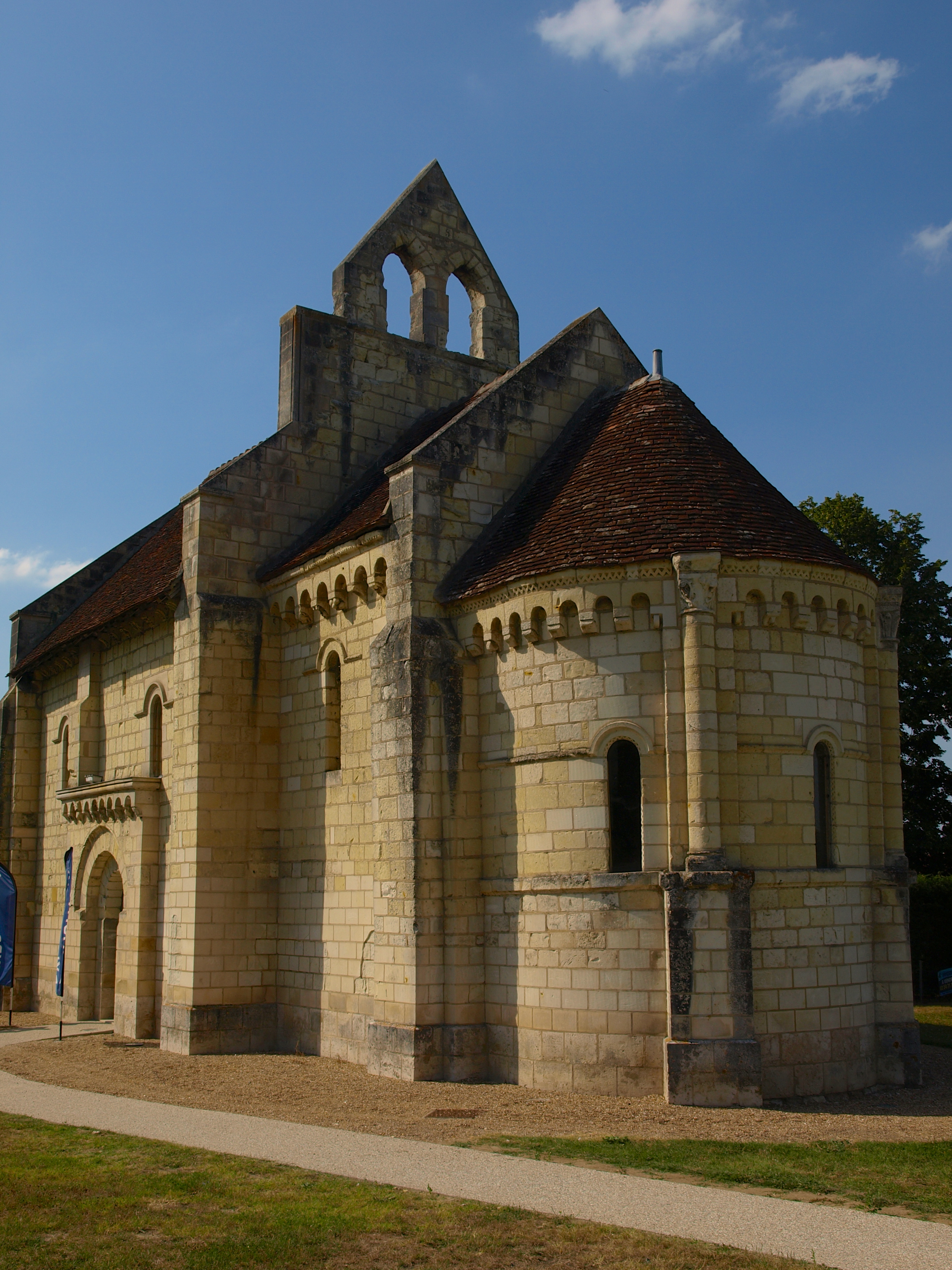
- The Chapel of Saint-Lazare, in Noyers-sur-Cher

- Coat of arms
- Location of Noyers-sur-Cher
- Location within France Location within Centre-Val de Loire
- Coordinates: 47°16′39″N 1°24′02″E
- Country: France
- Region: Centre-Val de Loire
- Department: Loir-et-Cher
- Arrondissement: Romorantin-Lanthenay
- Canton: Saint-Aignan
- Intercommunality: CC Val-de-Cher-Controis

Government
  - Mayor (2020–2026): Philippe Sartori
- Area^{1}: 22.74 km^{2} (8.78 sq mi)
- Elevation: 70 m (230 ft)
- Highest elevation: 121 m (397 ft)
- Lowest elevation: 63 m (207 ft)
- Population (2023): 2,631
  - Density: 115.7/km^{2} (299.7/sq mi)
- Demonym: Nucériens
- Time zone: UTC+01:00 (CET)
  - Summer (DST): UTC+02:00 (CEST)
- INSEE/Postal code: 41164 /41140
- ^{1} French Land Register data, which excludes lakes, ponds, glaciers > 1 km^{2} (0.386 sq mi or 247 acres) and river estuaries.

Noyers-sur-Cher (French pronunciation: [nwaje syʁ ʃɛʁ]; lit. 'Noyers-on-Cher') is a commune in the Loir-et-Cher department, central France.

== Population ==
Historical population

Year	Pop.	±% p.a.
1793	636	—
1821	908	+1.28%
1846	1,372	+1.66%
1872	1,830	+1.11%
1901	1,946	+0.21%
1926	1,811	−0.29%
1946	1,876	+0.18%
1962	1,969	+0.30%
1968	2,089	+0.99%

Year	Pop.	±% p.a.
1975	2,261	+1.14%
1982	2,600	+2.02%
1990	2,603	+0.01%
1999	2,602	−0.00%
2007	2,839	+1.10%
2012	2,786	−0.38%
2017	2,728	−0.42%
2023	2,631	−0.60%

Source: EHESS and INSEE (1968-2023)

== See also ==
- Communes of the Loir-et-Cher department
