= Cogny, Cher =

Cogny
- Commune
- Location of Cogny
- Location within France Location within Centre-Val de Loire
- Coordinates: 46°51′03″N 2°39′24″E
- Country: France
- Region: Centre-Val de Loire
- Department: Cher
- Arrondissement: Saint-Amand-Montrond
- Canton: Dun-sur-Auron
- Intercommunality: CC Le Dunois

Government
  - Mayor (2020–2026): Daniel Rondier
- Area^{1}: 16.69 km^{2} (6.44 sq mi)
- Elevation: 197 m (646 ft)
- Highest elevation: 236 m (774 ft)
- Lowest elevation: 163 m (535 ft)
- Population (2023): 31
  - Density: 1.9/km^{2} (4.8/sq mi)
- Time zone: UTC+01:00 (CET)
  - Summer (DST): UTC+02:00 (CEST)
- INSEE/Postal code: 18068 /18130
- ^{1} French Land Register data, which excludes lakes, ponds, glaciers > 1 km^{2} (0.386 sq mi or 247 acres) and river estuaries.

Cogny (French pronunciation: [kɔɲi]) is a commune in the Cher department in the Centre-Val de Loire region of France.

== Geography ==
Cogny is an area of farming and forestry containing a tiny village and two hamlets situated some 31 kilometres (19 mi) southeast of Bourges, at the junction of the D953 and the D148 roads.

== Population ==
Historical population
Year	Pop.	±% p.a.
1968	75	—
1975	60	−3.14%
1982	40	−5.63%
1990	36	−1.31%
1999	40	+1.18%
2007	37	−0.97%
2012	40	+1.57%
2017	35	−2.64%
2023	31	−2.00%
Source: INSEE

== See also ==
- Communes of the Cher department
