= Charenton-du-Cher =

- Commune
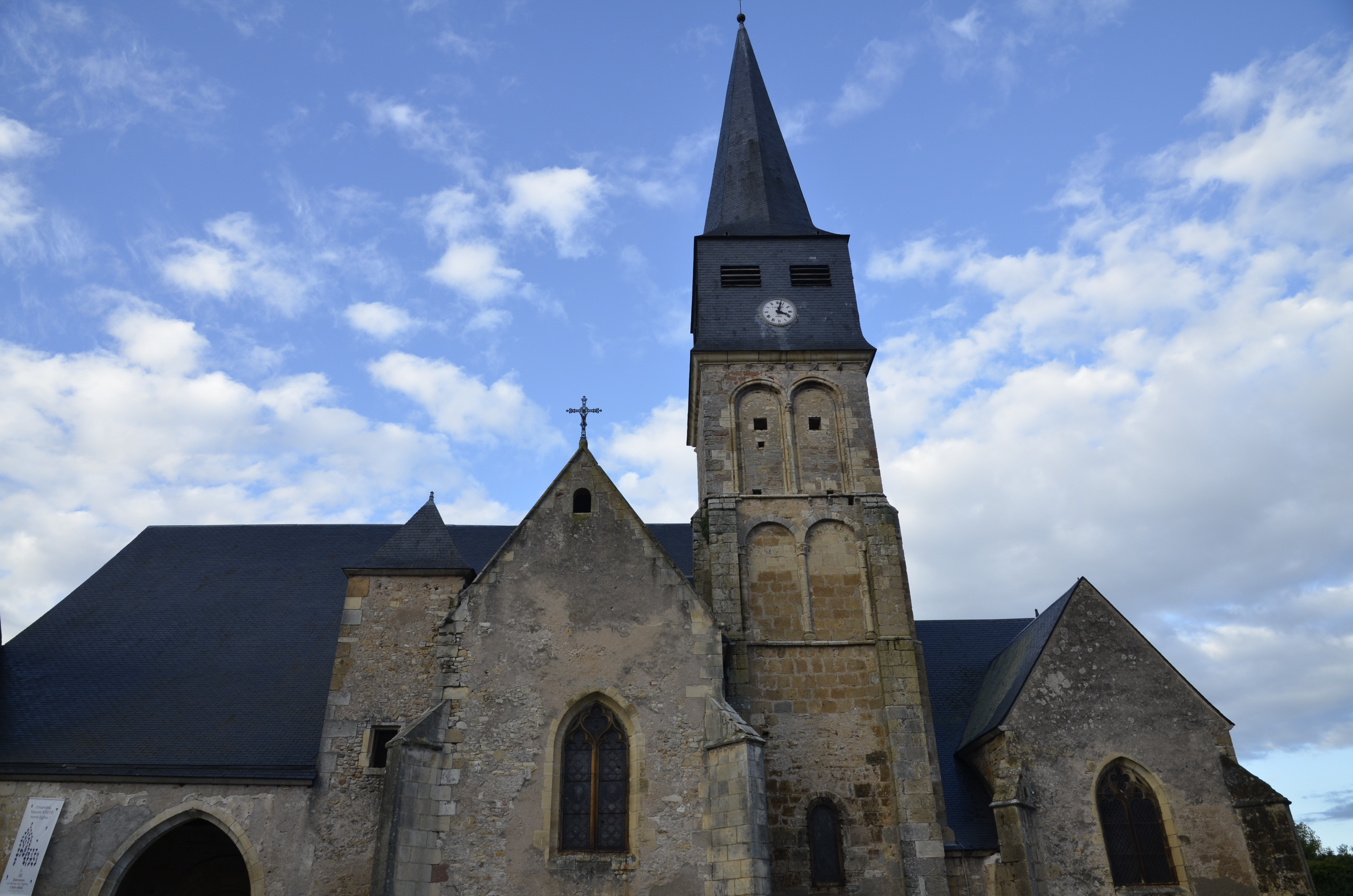
- The church in Charenton-du-Cher

- Coat of arms
- Location of Charenton-du-Cher
- Location within France Location within Centre-Val de Loire
- Coordinates: 46°43′50″N 2°38′35″E
- Country: France
- Region: Centre-Val de Loire
- Department: Cher
- Arrondissement: Saint-Amand-Montrond
- Canton: Dun-sur-Auron
- Intercommunality: CC Cœur de France

Government
  - Mayor (2020–2026): Pascal Aupy
- Area^{1}: 4,789 km^{2} (1,849 sq mi)
- Elevation: 178 m (584 ft)
- Highest elevation: 253 m (830 ft)
- Lowest elevation: 167 m (548 ft)
- Population (2023): 984
  - Density: 0.205/km^{2} (0.532/sq mi)
- Time zone: UTC+01:00 (CET)
  - Summer (DST): UTC+02:00 (CEST)
- INSEE/Postal code: 18052 /18210
- ^{1} French Land Register data, which excludes lakes, ponds, glaciers > 1 km^{2} (0.386 sq mi or 247 acres) and river estuaries.

Charenton-du-Cher (French pronunciation: [ʃaʁɑ̃tɔ̃ dy ʃɛʁ]) is a commune in the Cher department in the Centre-Val de Loire region of France.

== Geography ==
An area of farming, forestry and a little light industry comprising the village and several hamlets situated by the banks of both the canal de Berry and the river Marmande, some 28 miles (45 km) southeast of Bourges at the junction of the D951 with the D1 and D953 roads.

== Population ==
Historical population
Year	Pop.	±% p.a.
1968	1,372	—
1975	1,371	−0.01%
1982	1,292	−0.84%
1990	1,154	−1.40%
1999	1,096	−0.57%
2007	1,116	+0.23%
2012	1,100	−0.29%
2017	1,045	−1.02%
2023	984	−1.00%
Source: INSEE

== Sights ==
- The church of St. Martin, dating from the eleventh century.
- The motte of a tenth-century castle (30m diameter, 10m high).
- A fifteenth-century house on the rue Blanche.
- An old forge and its associated buildings, La "Grosse Forge"
- Remains of the convent abbey of Notre-Dame de Bellevaux, founded in 620.
- The remains of the 15th century chapel of St. Julien.
- A public washhouse.

== Famous people ==
- Amable Ricard (1828–1876), French politician

== See also ==
- Communes of the Cher department
