= Lantan, Cher =

Lantan
- Commune
- Location of Lantan
- Location within France Location within Centre-Val de Loire
- Coordinates: 46°54′27″N 2°39′46″E
- Country: France
- Region: Centre-Val de Loire
- Department: Cher
- Arrondissement: Saint-Amand-Montrond
- Canton: Dun-sur-Auron
- Intercommunality: CC Le Dunois

Government
  - Mayor (2020–2026): Hubert De Ganay
- Area^{1}: 13.36 km^{2} (5.16 sq mi)
- Elevation: 195 m (640 ft)
- Highest elevation: 200 m (660 ft)
- Lowest elevation: 167 m (548 ft)
- Population (2023): 96
  - Density: 7.2/km^{2} (19/sq mi)
- Time zone: UTC+01:00 (CET)
  - Summer (DST): UTC+02:00 (CEST)
- INSEE/Postal code: 18121 /18130
- ^{1} French Land Register data, which excludes lakes, ponds, glaciers > 1 km^{2} (0.386 sq mi or 247 acres) and river estuaries.

Lantan (French pronunciation: [lɑ̃tɑ̃]) is a commune in the Cher department in the Centre-Val de Loire region of France.

== Geography ==
A farming area comprising a small village and a couple of hamlets situated some 15 miles (24 km) southeast of Bourges, at the junction of the D126 and the D2076 roads. The river Airain forms most of the commune’s northern and eastern boundaries.

== Population ==
Historical population
Year	Pop.	±% p.a.
1968	218	—
1975	183	−2.47%
1982	140	−3.75%
1990	94	−4.86%
1999	107	+1.45%
2007	106	−0.12%
2012	105	−0.19%
2017	91	−2.82%
2023	96	+0.90%
Source: INSEE

== Sights ==
- The church of St. Paul, dating from the thirteenth century.
- The nineteenth-century chateau of Singleton.

== See also ==
- Communes of the Cher department
