= Bessais-le-Fromental =

- Commune
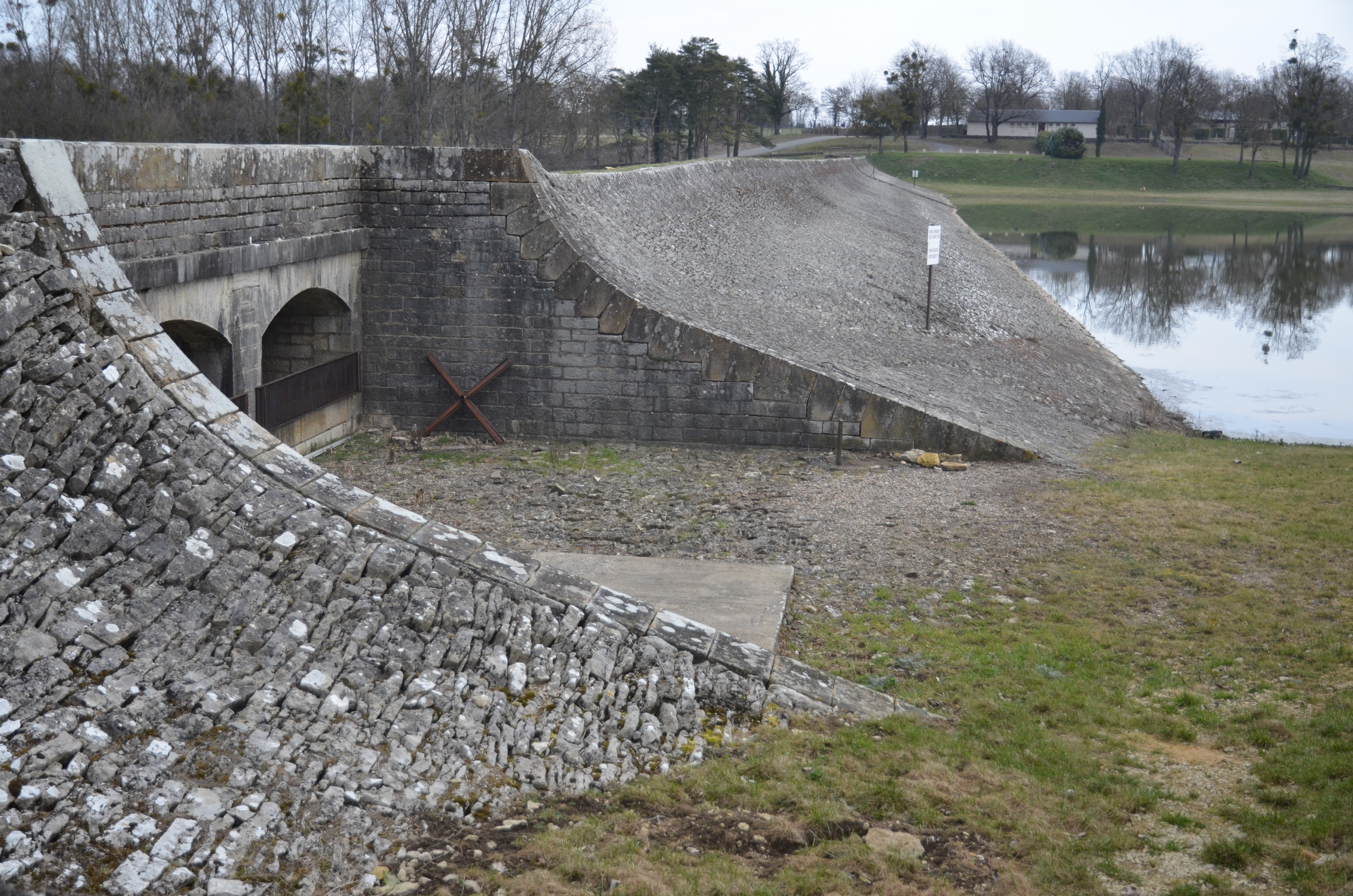
- Dam at Goule Pond

- Coat of arms
- Location of Bessais-le-Fromental
- Location within France Location within Centre-Val de Loire
- Coordinates: 46°44′48″N 2°45′45″E
- Country: France
- Region: Centre-Val de Loire
- Department: Cher
- Arrondissement: Saint-Amand-Montrond
- Canton: Dun-sur-Auron
- Intercommunality: CC Cœur de France

Government
  - Mayor (2020–2026): Serge Audonnet
- Area^{1}: 25.75 km^{2} (9.94 sq mi)
- Elevation: 200 m (660 ft)
- Highest elevation: 241 m (791 ft)
- Lowest elevation: 182 m (597 ft)
- Population (2023): 289
  - Density: 11.2/km^{2} (29.1/sq mi)
- Time zone: UTC+01:00 (CET)
  - Summer (DST): UTC+02:00 (CEST)
- INSEE/Postal code: 18029 /18210
- ^{1} French Land Register data, which excludes lakes, ponds, glaciers > 1 km^{2} (0.386 sq mi or 247 acres) and river estuaries.

Bessais-le-Fromental (French pronunciation: [bɛsɛ lə fʁɔmɑ̃tal]) is a commune in the Cher department in the Centre-Val de Loire region of France.

== Geography ==
A farming area comprising a village and several hamlets situated by the banks of the river Auron, some 27 miles (43 km) southeast of Bourges at the junction of the D175, D110 and the D951 roads. The commune shares its southern border with the department of Allier.

== Population ==
Historical population
Year	Pop.	±% p.a.
1968	535	—
1975	430	−3.07%
1982	405	−0.85%
1990	361	−1.43%
1999	325	−1.16%
2007	314	−0.43%
2012	326	+0.75%
2017	312	−0.87%
2023	289	−1.27%
Source: INSEE

== Sights ==
- The church of St.Martin, dating from the eleventh century.
- A watermill.
- Traces of the ancient château de Lalan.
- Ruins of the medieval town of Venou.

== See also ==
- Communes of the Cher department
