= Arpheuilles, Cher =

Arpheuilles
- Commune
- Location of Arpheuilles
- Location within France Location within Centre-Val de Loire
- Coordinates: 46°47′00″N 2°33′41″E
- Country: France
- Region: Centre-Val de Loire
- Department: Cher
- Arrondissement: Saint-Amand-Montrond
- Canton: Dun-sur-Auron
- Intercommunality: CC Cœur France

Government
  - Mayor (2020–2026): Pascal Augendre
- Area^{1}: 48.01 km^{2} (18.54 sq mi)
- Elevation: 201 m (659 ft)
- Highest elevation: 308 m (1,010 ft)
- Lowest elevation: 163 m (535 ft)
- Population (2023): 299
  - Density: 6.23/km^{2} (16.1/sq mi)
- Time zone: UTC+01:00 (CET)
  - Summer (DST): UTC+02:00 (CEST)
- INSEE/Postal code: 18013 /18200
- ^{1} French Land Register data, which excludes lakes, ponds, glaciers > 1 km^{2} (0.386 sq mi or 247 acres) and river estuaries.

Arpheuilles (French pronunciation: [aʁfœj]) is a commune in the Cher department in the Centre-Val de Loire region of France, about 22 miles (35 km) south of Bourges.

== Population ==
Historical population
Year	Pop.	±% p.a.
1968	306	—
1975	271	−1.72%
1982	244	−1.49%
1990	333	+3.96%
1999	322	−0.37%
2007	340	+0.68%
2012	332	−0.48%
2017	297	−2.20%
2023	299	+0.11%
Source: INSEE

== See also ==
- Communes of the Cher department
