= Le Pondy =

- Commune
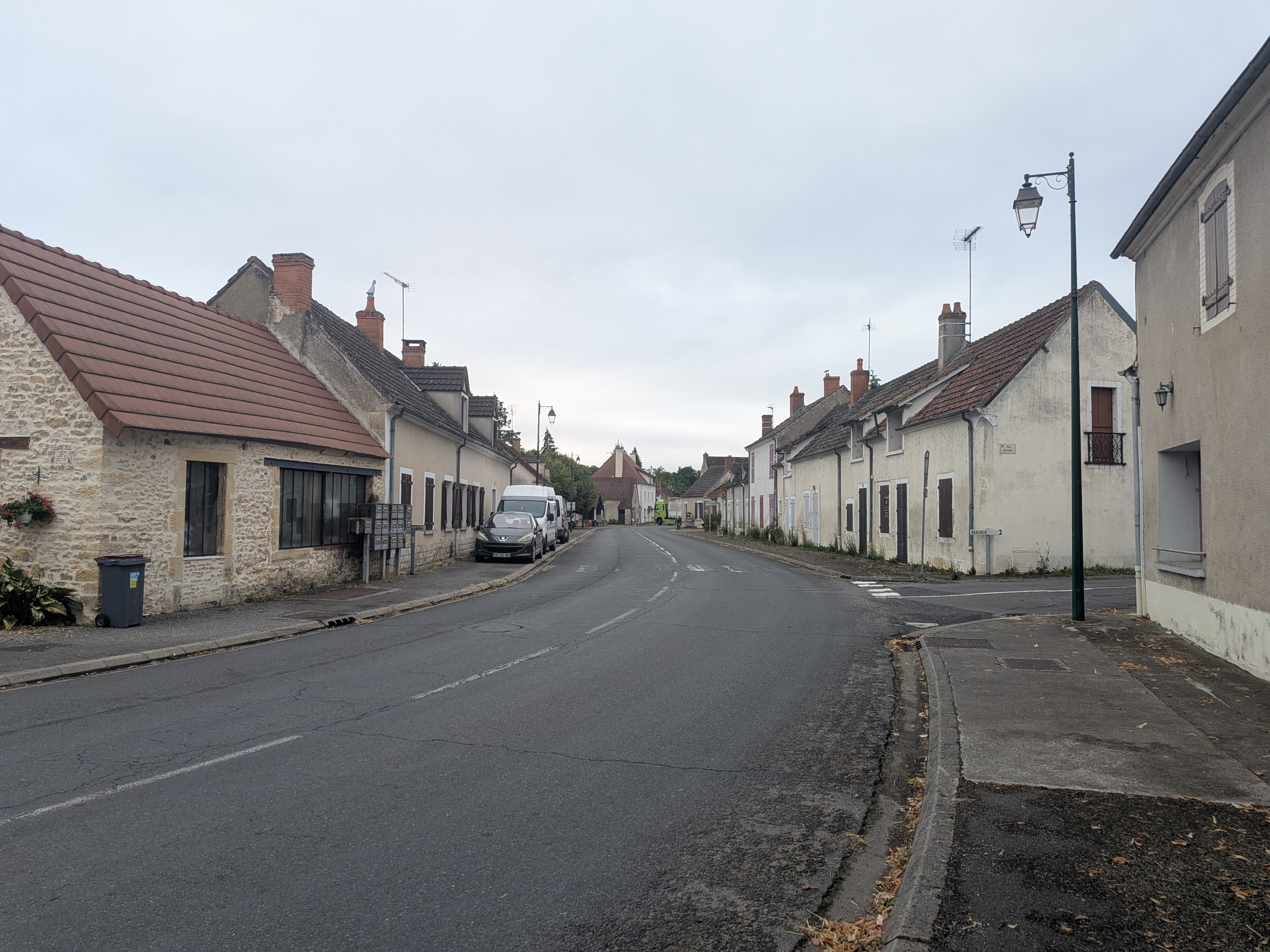
- Main street of Le Pondy.
- Location of Le Pondy
- Location within France Location within Centre-Val de Loire
- Coordinates: 46°48′18″N 2°39′01″E
- Country: France
- Region: Centre-Val de Loire
- Department: Cher
- Arrondissement: Saint-Amand-Montrond
- Canton: Dun-sur-Auron
- Intercommunality: CC Le Dunois

Government
  - Mayor (2020–2026): Yves Petit
- Area^{1}: 6.63 km^{2} (2.56 sq mi)
- Elevation: 175 m (574 ft)
- Highest elevation: 190 m (620 ft)
- Lowest elevation: 165 m (541 ft)
- Population (2023): 147
  - Density: 22.2/km^{2} (57.4/sq mi)
- Time zone: UTC+01:00 (CET)
  - Summer (DST): UTC+02:00 (CEST)
- INSEE/Postal code: 18183 /18210
- ^{1} French Land Register data, which excludes lakes, ponds, glaciers > 1 km^{2} (0.386 sq mi or 247 acres) and river estuaries.

Le Pondy (French pronunciation: [lə pɔ̃di]) is a commune in the Cher department in the Centre-Val de Loire region of France.

== Geography ==
An area of lakes, forestry and farming comprising a small village and two hamlets situated by the banks of the river Arnon, some 21 miles (34 km) southeast of Bourges, at the junction of the D953 and the D6 roads.

== Population ==
Historical population
Year	Pop.	±% p.a.
1968	172	—
1975	129	−4.03%
1982	127	−0.22%
1990	124	−0.30%
1999	140	+1.36%
2007	113	−2.64%
2012	140	+4.38%
2017	144	+0.57%
2023	147	+0.34%
Source: INSEE

== Sights ==
- The fifteenth-century chateau.
- An eighteenth-century stone cross.

== See also ==
- Communes of the Cher department
