= Coust =

- Commune
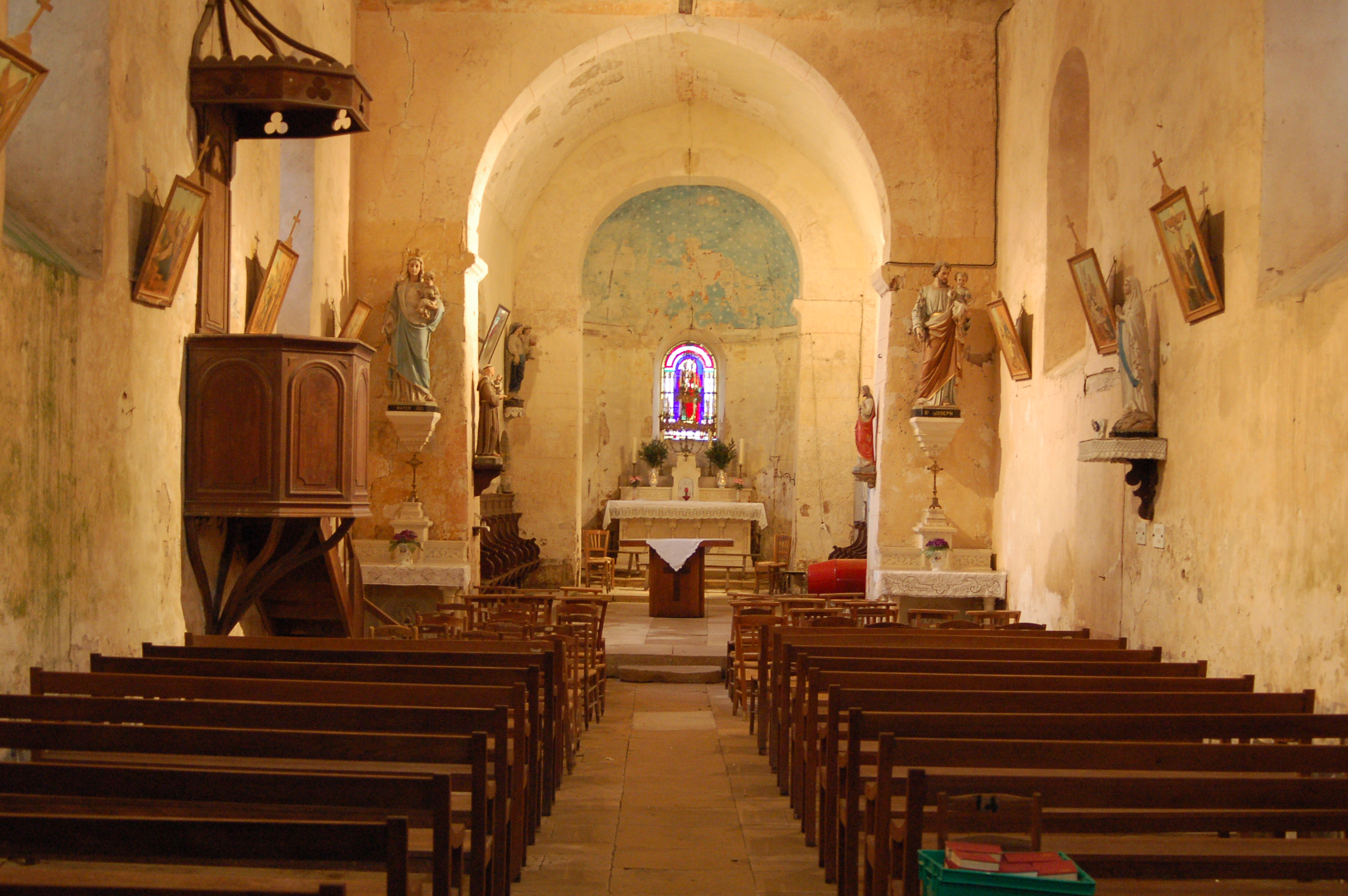
- The interior of the church of Our Lady, in Coust
- Location of Coust
- Location within France Location within Centre-Val de Loire
- Coordinates: 46°41′36″N 2°35′50″E
- Country: France
- Region: Centre-Val de Loire
- Department: Cher
- Arrondissement: Saint-Amand-Montrond
- Canton: Dun-sur-Auron
- Intercommunality: CC Cœur de France

Government
  - Mayor (2020–2026): Pascal Collin
- Area^{1}: 21.89 km^{2} (8.45 sq mi)
- Elevation: 210 m (690 ft)
- Highest elevation: 247 m (810 ft)
- Lowest elevation: 153 m (502 ft)
- Population (2023): 415
  - Density: 19.0/km^{2} (49.1/sq mi)
- Time zone: UTC+01:00 (CET)
  - Summer (DST): UTC+02:00 (CEST)
- INSEE/Postal code: 18076 /18210
- ^{1} French Land Register data, which excludes lakes, ponds, glaciers > 1 km^{2} (0.386 sq mi or 247 acres) and river estuaries.

Coust is a commune in the Cher department in the Centre-Val de Loire region of France.

== Geography ==
An area of farming and forestry comprising a village and several hamlets situated by the banks of both the Cher and the small river Chignon some 26 miles (42 km) east of Bourges at the junction of the D1 with the D101 and the D2144 roads. The commune shares a border with the département of Allier.

== Population ==
Historical population
Year	Pop.	±% p.a.
1968	525	—
1975	518	−0.19%
1982	460	−1.68%
1990	506	+1.20%
1999	475	−0.70%
2007	466	−0.24%
2012	456	−0.43%
2017	445	−0.49%
2023	415	−1.16%
Source: INSEE

== Sights ==
- The twelfth-century church of Notre-Dame.
- The ruins of the fourteenth-century castle of Le Creuzet.
- The remains of feudal fortifications at Meslon, and a dovecote.
- The chateau of Bonnais, dating from the thirteenth century.
- Three old washhouses.
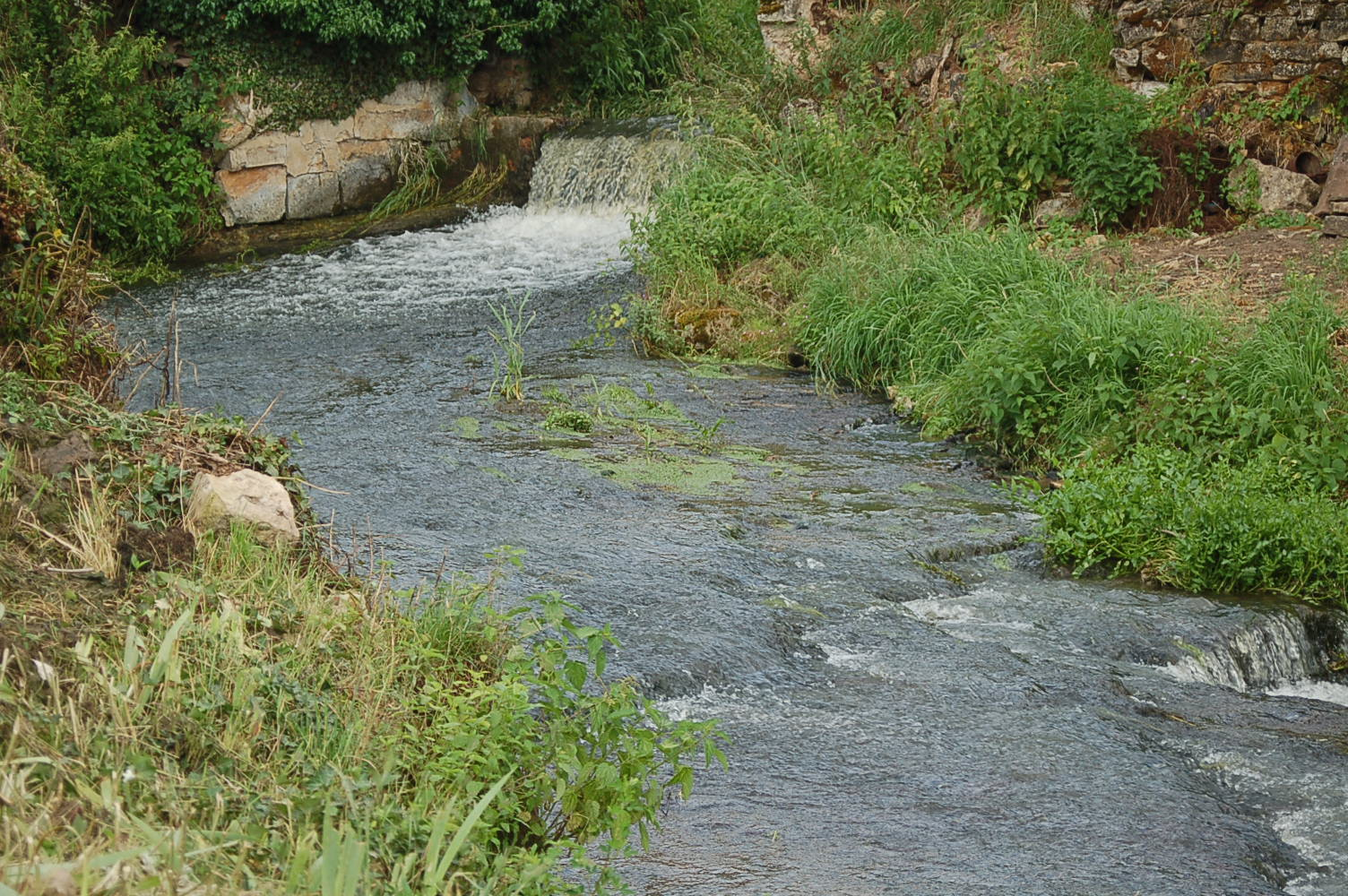
The Chignon river

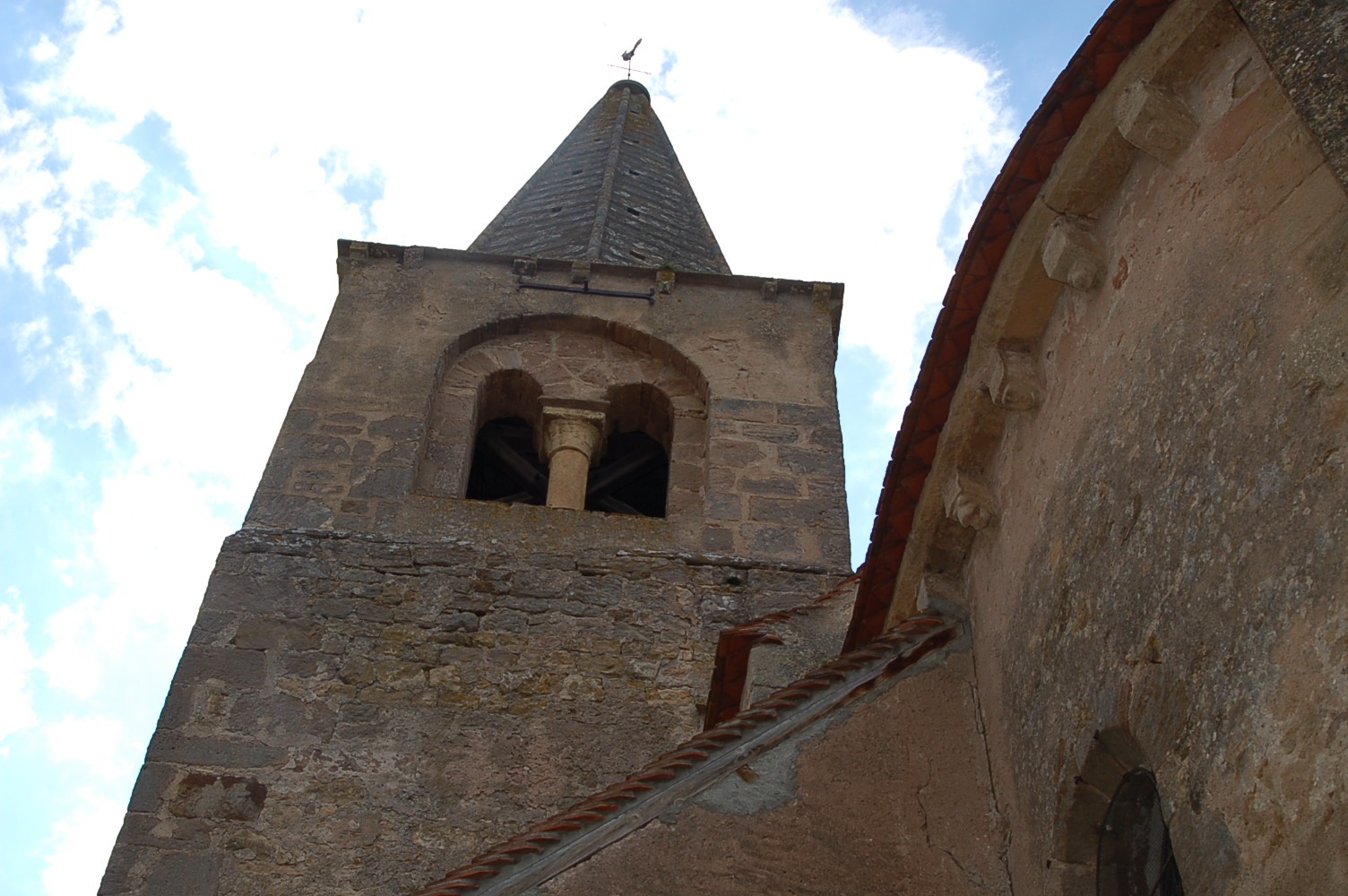
The church tower

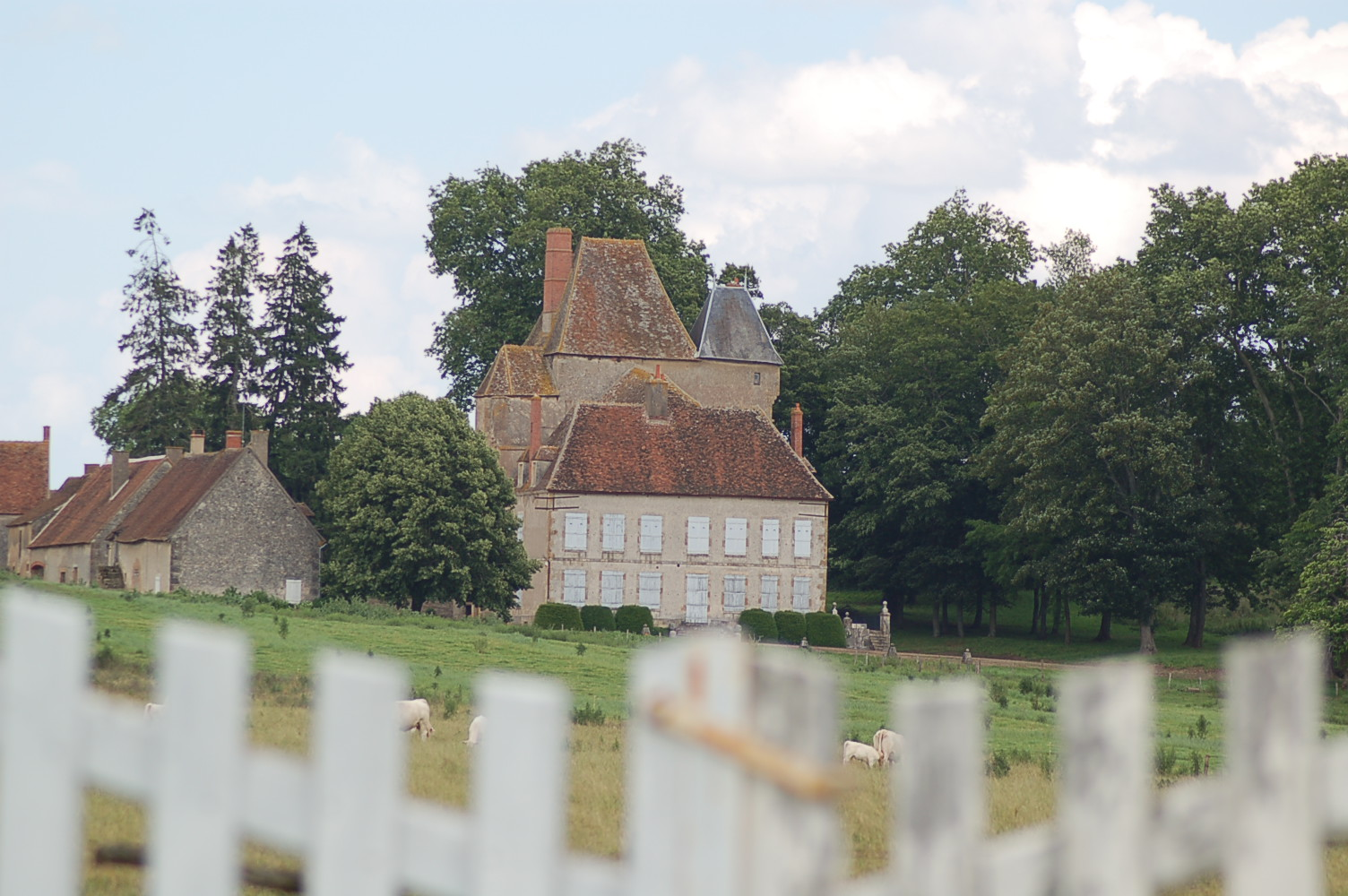
Château du Creuzet

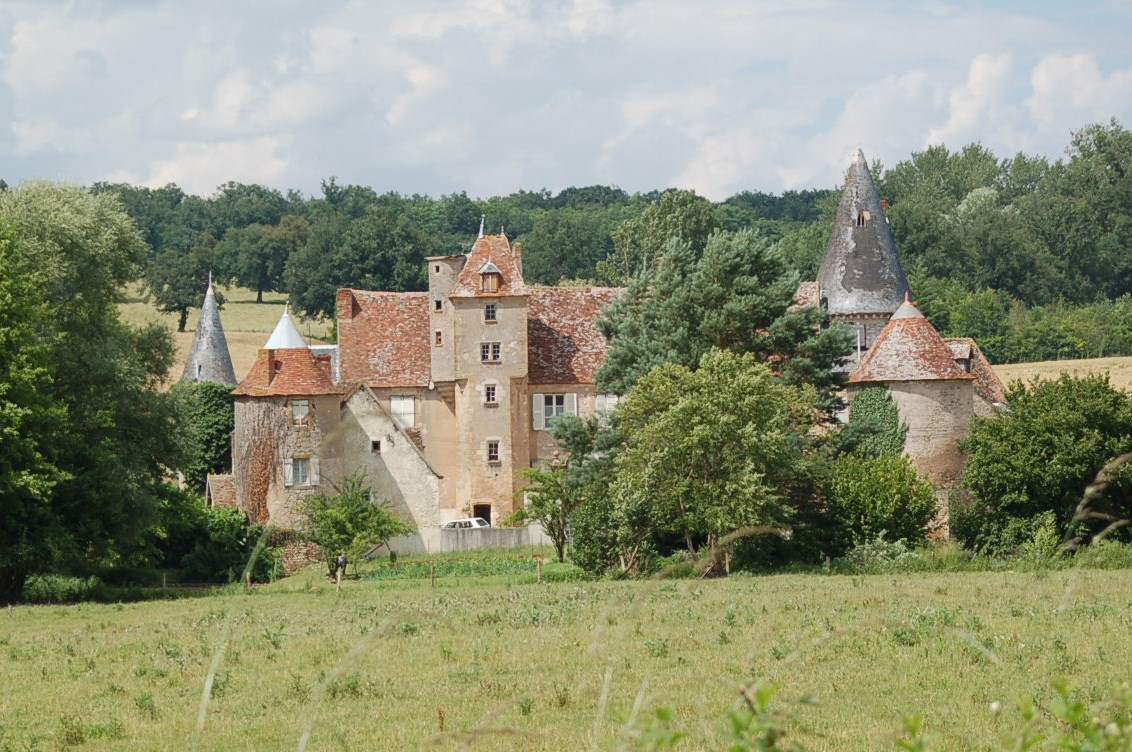
Château de Bonnais

== See also ==
- Communes of the Cher department
