= Louis Dutens =

French writer (1730–1812)

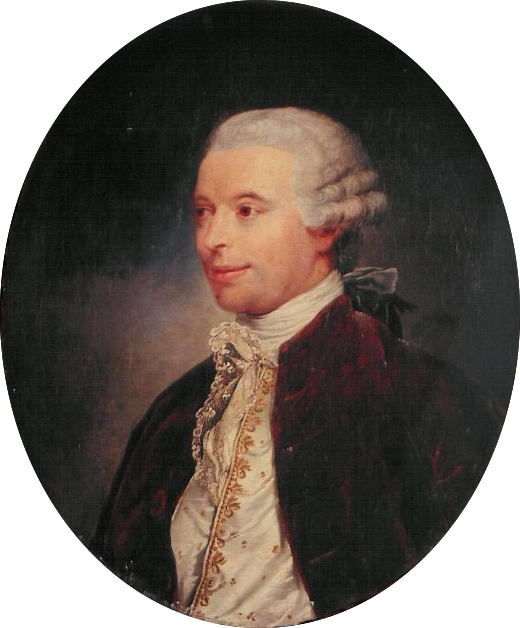

Louis Dutens (15 January 1730 – 23 May 1812) was a French writer born in Tours, of Protestant parents, who lived most of his life in Britain or in British service on the continent.

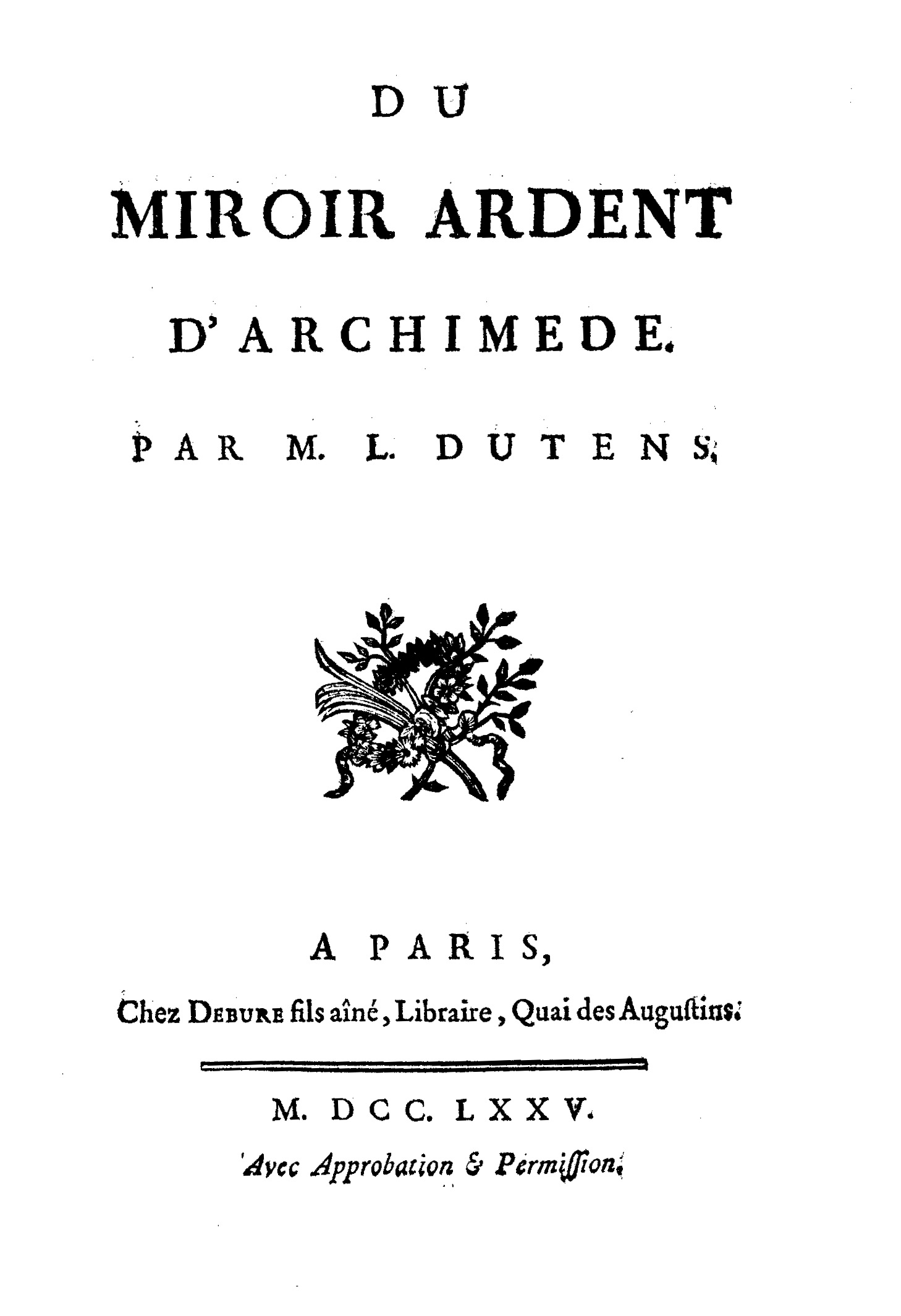
Du miroir ardent d'Archimede, 1775

He went to London, where his uncle was a jeweller, and there obtained a situation as tutor in a private family. In this position he learnt mathematics, Greek, Italian, Spanish and several oriental languages. He took orders, and was appointed chaplain and secretary to the English minister at the court of Turin in October 1758. From 1760 to 1762, he was chargé d'affaires at Turin. Lord Bute, before retiring from office in 1763, procured him a pension. He again went to Turin as chargé d'affaires; and during this second mission he collected and published an edition of the works of Leibniz (Gothofridi Guillemi Leibnitii Opera Omnia, Geneva, 6 vols., 1768) and wrote his Recherches sur l'origine des découvertes attribuées aux modernes (1766).

On his return to England the Duke of Northumberland procured him the living of Elsdon, in Northumberland, and made Dutens overseer and senior travel companion – in effect, tutor – to his younger son during his Grand Tour. At Rome in 1769, Dutens published Le tocsin (later published in Paris as Appel au bon sens), a work of Christian apologetics. He was active in civic life beyond the parish and preached the annual sermon to the Charity School of St Nicholas, Newcastle, in 1768.

In 1775, he became a member of the French Academy of Inscriptions and a fellow of the Royal Society. Dutens was for a third time chargé d'affaires at Turin. He was in Paris in 1783, and returned to London the following year. Between 1775 and 1805, he wrote his Memoirs of a Traveler, Now in Retirement, which contains a wide-ranging miscellany of Dutens' life "interspersed with historical, literary, and political anecdotes relative to the principal personages of the present age". He died in London in 1812.
