= Bannegon =

- Commune
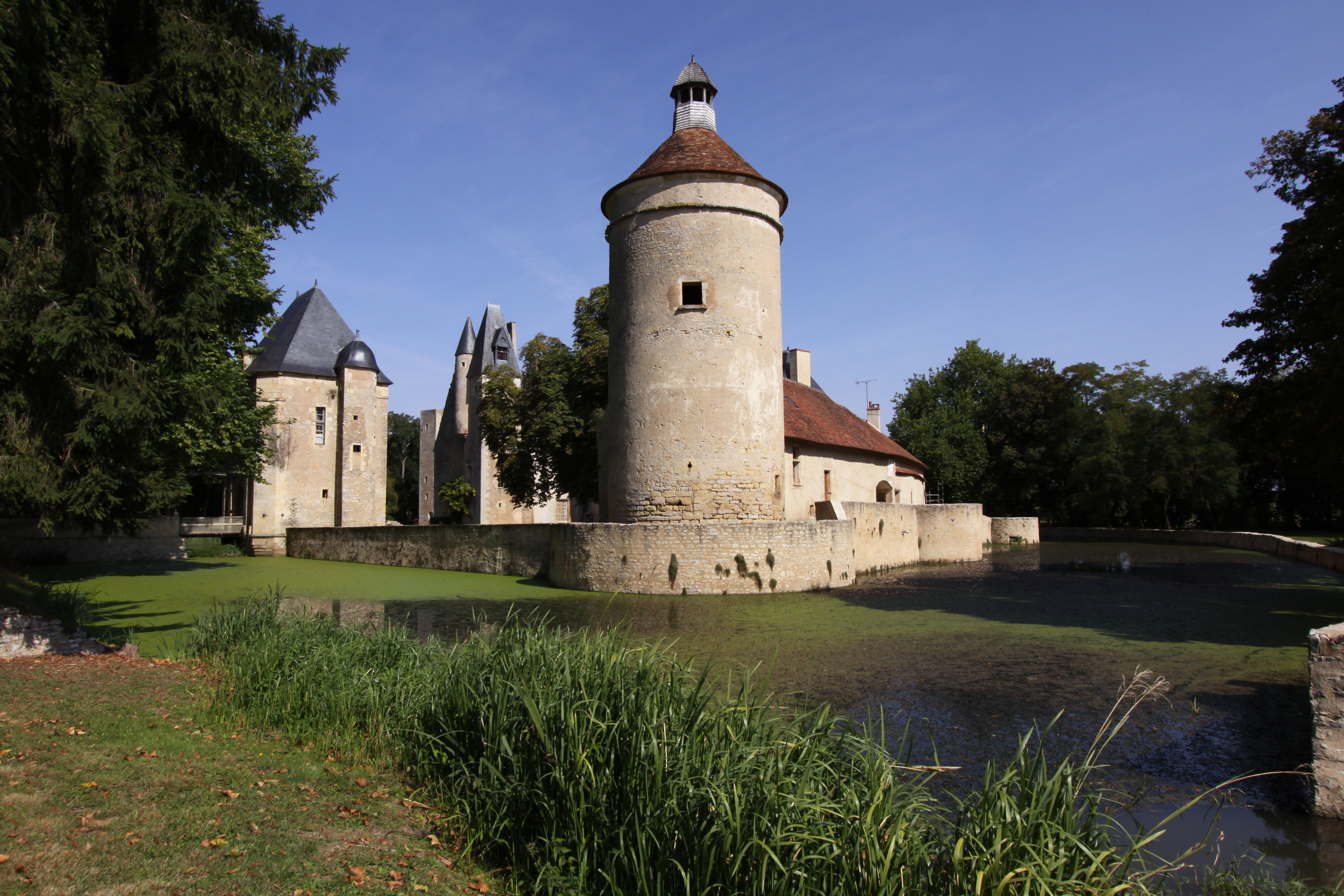
- Chateau
- Location of Bannegon
- Location within France Location within Centre-Val de Loire
- Coordinates: 46°48′07″N 2°42′51″E
- Country: France
- Region: Centre-Val de Loire
- Department: Cher
- Arrondissement: Saint-Amand-Montrond
- Canton: Dun-sur-Auron
- Intercommunality: CC Le Dunois

Government
  - Mayor (2020–2026): Christian Richard
- Area^{1}: 21.08 km^{2} (8.14 sq mi)
- Elevation: 200 m (660 ft)
- Highest elevation: 256 m (840 ft)
- Lowest elevation: 173 m (568 ft)
- Population (2023): 233
  - Density: 11.1/km^{2} (28.6/sq mi)
- Time zone: UTC+01:00 (CET)
  - Summer (DST): UTC+02:00 (CEST)
- INSEE/Postal code: 18021 /18210
- ^{1} French Land Register data, which excludes lakes, ponds, glaciers > 1 km^{2} (0.386 sq mi or 247 acres) and river estuaries.

Bannegon (French pronunciation: [banɡɔ̃]) is a commune in the Cher department in the Centre-Val de Loire region of France.

== Population ==
Historical population
Year	Pop.	±% p.a.
1968	383	—
1975	351	−1.24%
1982	297	−2.36%
1990	260	−1.65%
1999	254	−0.26%
2007	272	+0.86%
2012	251	−1.59%
2017	274	+1.77%
2023	233	−2.67%
Source: INSEE

== See also ==
- Communes of the Cher department
