= Auron (river) =

River in central France

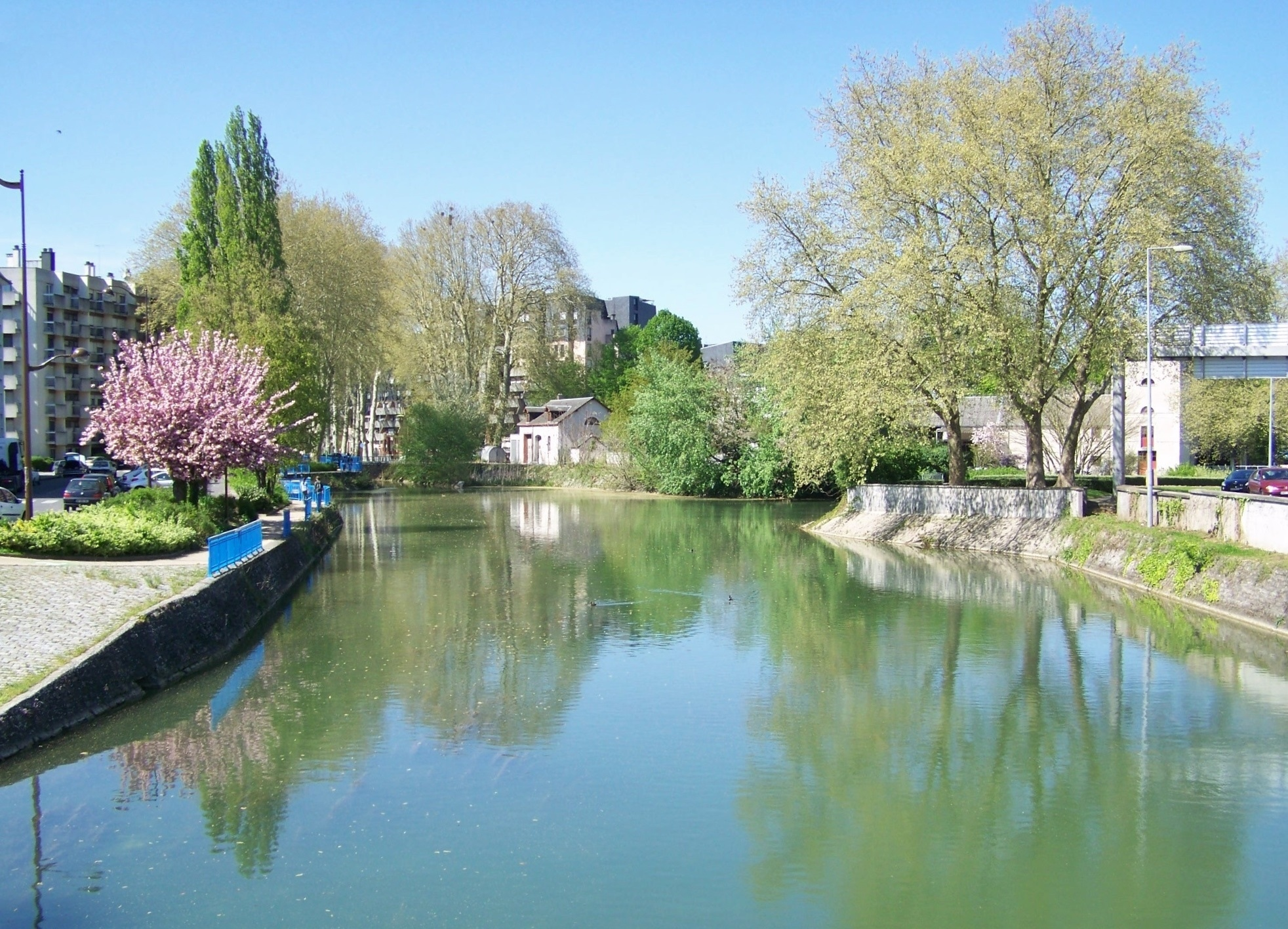

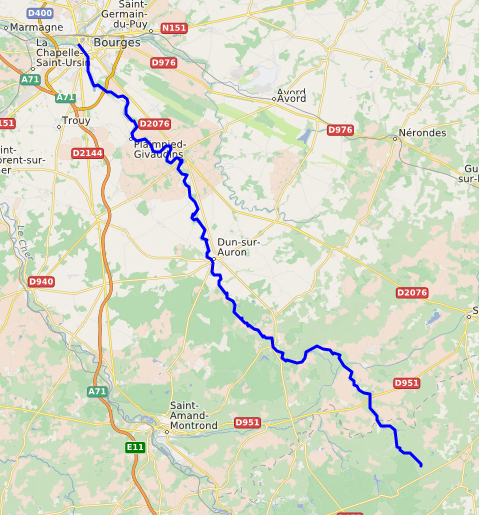

Location
- Country: France

Physical characteristics
- Mouth
  - location: Yèvre
  - coordinates: 47°5′8″N 2°23′2″E
- Length: 76.9 kilometres (47.8 mi)
- Basin size: 585 km^{2} (226 mi^{2})
- Discharge
  - average: 3.73 m^{3}/s (132 cu ft/s)

Basin features
- Progression: Yèvre→ Cher→ Loire→ Atlantic Ocean

The Auron (French pronunciation: [oʁɔ̃]) is a 76.9 km (47.8 mi) long river in central France, a left tributary of the river Yèvre. Its source is near the village of Valigny, west of Lurcy-Lévis. The Auron flows generally northwest through the following towns, all in the department of Cher: Bannegon, Dun-sur-Auron, Saint-Just, Plaimpied-Givaudins and Bourges.

The Auron flows into the Yèvre at Bourges. For much of its length, it runs parallel to the disused Canal de Berry.
