= Berry Canal =

Disused canal in France

Canal de Berry
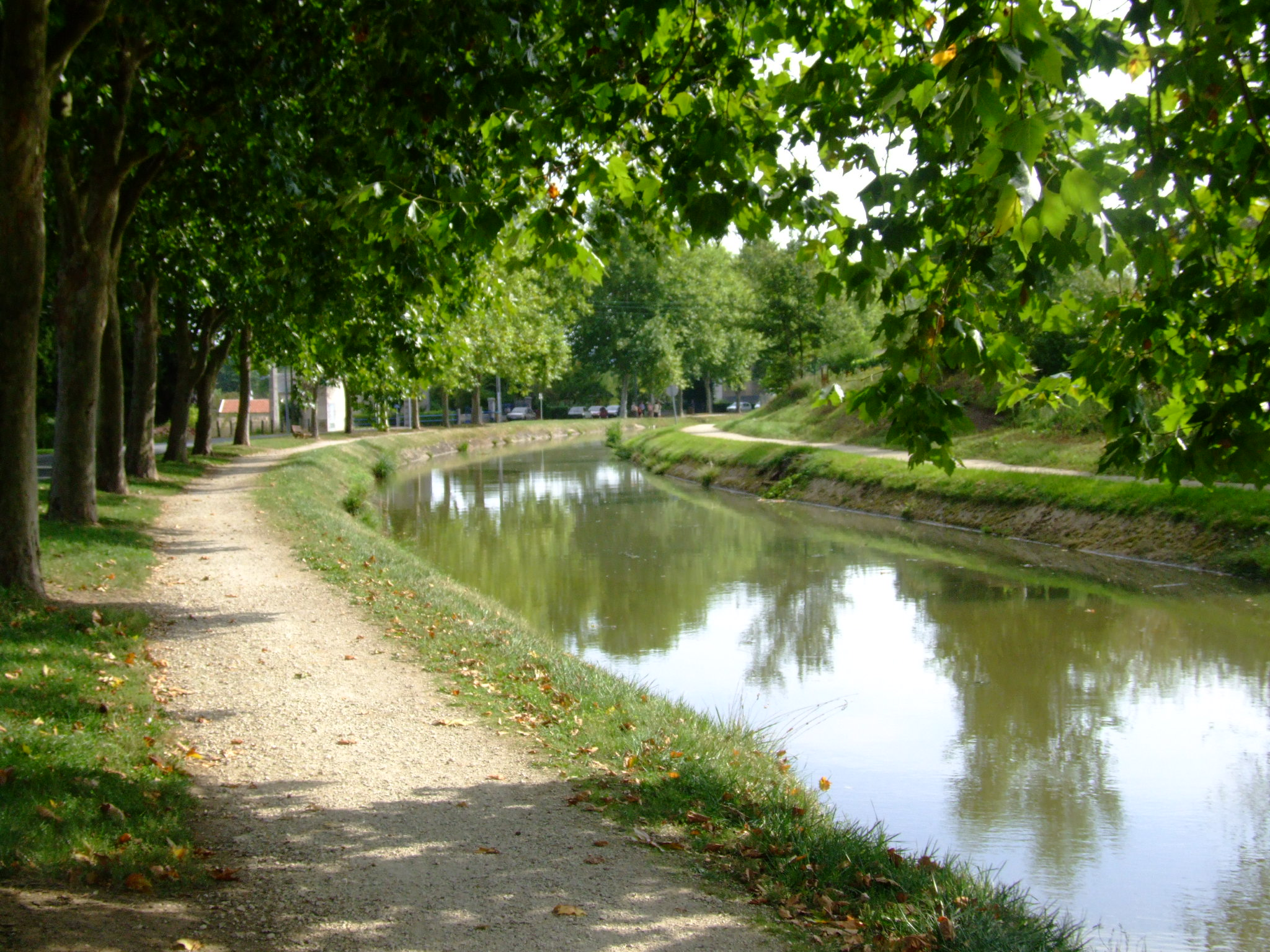
- The Canal de Berry in Saint-Amand-Montrond
- Interactive map of Canal de Berry

Specifications
- Status: Closed except for 15km operational segment with 5 locks between Selles-sur-Cher and Noyers-sur-Cher

History
- Principal engineer: Joseph-Michel Dutens
- Date approved: 1780
- Construction began: 1809
- Date completed: 1839

Geography
- Start point: Cher at Noyers-sur-Cher
- Beginning coordinates: 47.2680°N 1.3881°E

The Canal de Berry (French pronunciation: [kanal də beʁi]) is a disused canal in France which links the Canal latéral à la Loire at Marseilles-lès-Aubigny with the Cher at Noyers rejoining the Loire near Tours. With a branch from Montluçon it provided 261 kilometres (162 mi) of canal with locks 2.7 metres (8.9 ft) wide from 1840 until its closure in 1955. There is now a 15 kilometres (9.3 mi) long operational segment with five locks between Selles-sur-Cher and Noyers-sur-Cher.

== Construction ==
Although discussed from 1484, it was not until 1780 when Armand II-Joseph, 6th Duke of Béthune Charost presented the first solid proposal to the provincial assembly. But work did not start until after an imperial decree in 1809 and was not completed until 1839. The work was designed by Joseph-Michel Dutens and mainly carried out by Spanish prisoners of war in the 1820s.

Because of the shortage of water near the summit level at Sancoins, the 96 locks of the canal were built to a gauge of only 27.5 metres (90 ft) by 2.7 metres (8.9 ft), similar to British "narrow canal" practice. Barges built to this gauge are called berrichons. They could carry about 60 tonnes of freight over the summit of the Canal de Berry but their draught allowed them to carry up to 100 tonnes on other French waterways. By 1865 there were 890 berrichons on the waterway, drawn by teams of two to four horses, mules or donkeys.

The main traffic of the canal was cast iron from the forges at Montluçon, and coal, pit props, wines and spirits. However despite a new pumping station in 1878, leakages caused a lowering of water levels so the canal was never upgraded to the Freycinet gauge. Traffic declined steadily till the 1930s and was finally closed in 1955.

== Restoration ==
There is an active Association for Reopening the Canal de Berry (ARECABE) which has so far succeeded in rewatering 15 kilometres (9.3 mi) of the canal and two locks. It organises festivals and there is a canal museum at Reugny.

== See also ==
- List of canals in France
- Media related to Canal de Berry at Wikimedia Commons
