= Canton of Levet =

Coordinates: 46°55′36″N 2°24′34″E

Levet
- Former canton
- Interactive map of Levet
- Country: France
- Region: Centre-Val de Loire
- Department: Cher
- No. of communes: {{{nbcomm}}}
- Disbanded: 2015
- Area: 247.71 km^{2} (95.64 sq mi)
- Population (2012): 10,922
  - Density: 44.092/km^{2} (114.20/sq mi)

The Canton of Levet is a former canton situated in the Cher département and in the Centre region of France. It was disbanded following the French canton reorganisation which came into effect in March 2015. It consisted of 13 communes, which joined the new canton of Trouy in 2015. It had 10,922 inhabitants (2012).

== Geography ==
An area of farming and forestry in the arrondissement of Bourges centred on the town of Levet. The altitude varies from 122m at Saint-Caprais to 184m at Vorly, with an average altitude of 170m.

The canton comprised 13 communes:

- Annoix
- Arçay
- Lapan
- Levet
- Lissay-Lochy
- Plaimpied-Givaudins
- Saint-Caprais
- Saint-Just
- Sainte-Lunaise
- Senneçay
- Soye-en-Septaine
- Trouy
- Vorly

== Population ==
Historical population Canton of Levet
Year	1962	1968	1975	1982	1990	1999
Pop.	4,776	5,198	6,663	7,976	8,686	9,091
±%	—	+8.8%	+28.2%	+19.7%	+8.9%	+4.7%
From the year 1962 on: No double counting – residents of multiple communes (e.g. students and military personnel) are counted only once. Source: INSEE

== See also ==
- Arrondissements of the Cher department
- Cantons of the Cher department
- Communes of the Cher department
