= Canton of Châteauneuf-sur-Cher =

Coordinates: 46°51′30″N 2°19′2″E

Châteauneuf-sur-Cher
- Former canton
- Interactive map of Châteauneuf-sur-Cher
- Country: France
- Region: Centre-Val de Loire
- Department: Cher
- No. of communes: {{{nbcomm}}}
- Disbanded: 2015
- Area: 217.83 km^{2} (84.10 sq mi)
- Population (2012): 4,602
  - Density: 21.13/km^{2} (54.72/sq mi)

The Canton of Châteauneuf-sur-Cher is a former canton situated in the Cher département and in the Centre region of France. It was disbanded following the French canton reorganisation which came into effect in March 2015. It consisted of 11 communes, which joined the canton of Trouy in 2015. It had 4,602 inhabitants (2012).

== Geography ==
An area of forestry and farming by the banks of the Cher in the northwestern part of the arrondissement of Saint-Amand-Montrond, centred on the town of Châteauneuf-sur-Cher. The altitude varies from 128m at Corquoy to 226m at Vallenay, with an average altitude of 164m.

The canton comprised 11 communes:

- Chambon
- Châteauneuf-sur-Cher
- Chavannes
- Corquoy
- Crézançay-sur-Cher
- Saint-Loup-des-Chaumes
- Saint-Symphorien
- Serruelles
- Uzay-le-Venon
- Vallenay
- Venesmes

== Population ==
Historical population Canton of Châteauneuf-sur-Cher
Year	1962	1968	1975	1982	1990	1999
Pop.	4,699	5,044	4,939	4,554	4,631	4,458
±%	—	+7.3%	−2.1%	−7.8%	+1.7%	−3.7%
From the year 1962 on: No double counting – residents of multiple communes (e.g. students and military personnel) are counted only once. Source: INSEE

== See also ==
- Arrondissements of the Cher department
- Cantons of the Cher department
- Communes of the Cher department
