= Communauté de communes des Rives du Cher =

Rives du Cher
- Former communauté de communes
- Country: France
- Region: Centre-Val de Loire
- Department: Cher
- No. of communes: {{{nbcomm}}}
- Established: 1994
- Disbanded: 2011
- Area: 176 km^{2} (68 sq mi)
- Population (2006): 5,000
  - Density: 28/km^{2} (74/sq mi)

The communauté de communes des Rives du Cher was located in the Cher département of the Centre region of France. It was created in January 1994. It was merged into the new Communauté de communes Arnon Boischaut Cher in 2011.

The Communauté de communes comprised the following communes:

- La Celle-Condé
- Châteauneuf-sur-Cher
- Corquoy
- Lapan
- Lignières
- Montlouis
- Saint-Symphorien
- Venesmes
- Villecelin
