= Communauté de communes des Portes du Boischaut =

Portes du Boischaut
- Former communauté de communes
- Country: France
- Region: Centre-Val de Loire
- Department: Cher
- No. of communes: {{{nbcomm}}}
- Established: 2000
- Disbanded: 2011
- Area: 131.94 km^{2} (50.94 sq mi)
- Population (1999): 1,837
  - Density: 13.92/km^{2} (36.06/sq mi)

The communauté de communes des Portes du Boischaut was created on December 14, 1999 and is located in the Cher département of the Centre region of France. It was created in January 2000. It was merged into the new Communauté de communes Arnon Boischaut Cher in 2011.

The Communauté de communes comprised the following communes:

1. Chambon
2. Chavannes
3. Crézançay-sur-Cher
4. Saint-Loup-des-Chaumes
5. Serruelles
6. Uzay-le-Venon
7. Vallenay
