= Communauté de communes des Rampennes =

Rampennes
- Former communauté de communes
- Country: France
- Region: Centre-Val de Loire
- Department: Cher
- No. of communes: {{{nbcomm}}}
- Established: 2002
- Disbanded: 2012
- Area: 100.69 km^{2} (38.88 sq mi)
- Population (1999): 2,132
  - Density: 21.17/km^{2} (54.84/sq mi)

The communauté de communes des Rampennes was created on December 31, 2001, and is located in the Cher département of the Centre region of France. It was created in January 2002. It was dissolved on December 31, 2012.

The Communauté de communes comprised the following communes:

- Levet
- Lissay-Lochy
- Sainte-Lunaise
- Senneçay
- Vorly
