= Canton of Lignières =

Coordinates: 46°47′38″N 2°11′7″E

Lignières
- Former canton
- Interactive map of Lignières
- Country: France
- Region: Centre-Val de Loire
- Department: Cher
- No. of communes: {{{nbcomm}}}
- Disbanded: 2015
- Area: 262.41 km^{2} (101.32 sq mi)
- Population (2012): 4,097
  - Density: 15.61/km^{2} (40.44/sq mi)

The Canton of Lignières is a former canton situated in the Cher département and in the Centre region of France. It was disbanded following the French canton reorganisation which came into effect in March 2015. It consisted of 9 communes, which joined the canton of Châteaumeillant in 2015. It had 4,097 inhabitants (2012).

== Geography ==
An area of forestry and farming in the valley of the river Arnon, in the western part of the arrondissement of Saint-Amand-Montrond centred on the town of Lignières. The altitude varies from 137m at Chezal-Benoît to 268m at Saint-Hilaire-en-Lignières, with an average altitude of 175m.

The canton comprised 9 communes:

- La Celle-Condé
- Chezal-Benoît
- Ineuil
- Lignières
- Montlouis
- Saint-Baudel
- Saint-Hilaire-en-Lignières
- Touchay
- Villecelin

== Population ==
Historical population Canton of Lignières
Year	1962	1968	1975	1982	1990	1999
Pop.	5,538	5,871	5,408	5,051	4,579	4,287
±%	—	+6.0%	−7.9%	−6.6%	−9.3%	−6.4%
From the year 1962 on: No double counting – residents of multiple communes (e.g. students and military personnel) are counted only once. Source: INSEE

== See also ==
- Arrondissements of the Cher department
- Cantons of the Cher department
- Communes of the Cher department
