= Uzay =

Uzay may refer to:

- Uzay Heparı (1969-1994), Turkish composer, music producer, songwriter and actor
- Uzay-le-Venon, commune in the Cher département of the Centre region of France
- Uzair, figure mentioned in the Quran
