= Marcel Bascoulard =

French artist (1913–1978)

- Born: 10 February 1913; Vallenay, France
- Died: 12 January 1978 (aged 64); Bourges, France
- Resting place: St. Lazare Cemetery, Bourges
- Education: École des Beaux-Arts
- Occupations: Photographer; illustrator; painter; poet; designer

Marcel Armand Bascoulard-Mulet (10 February 1913 – 12 January 1978) was a French photographer, illustrator, painter, poet, and designer. He is known for his prolific self-portraits produced throughout his life which featured him wearing handmade dresses. He is often referred to as the "Diogenes of Bourges."

== Early life ==
Bascoulard was born in Vallenay to Léon Bascoulard and Marguerite Bascoulard (née Mulet) and grew up in Saint Florent-sur-Cher. He was known to add his mother's surname along to "Bascoulard." As a child, he wished to become a train engineer. In 1932, when Bascoulard was 19, his mother shot and killed his father after attempting to flee, and was committed to the Beauregard Psychiatric Hospital for the rest of her life. This event traumatized the young man, as he was very close with his mother.

== Career as an artist ==
After his father's death, Bascoulard moved to the neighborhood of Avaricum in Bourges, to be closer to the mental asylum where his mother stayed. Here, he would live the rest of his life as a vagrant. He studied at the École des Beaux-Arts. He began his career as an artist by making landscapes of the city's and nearby suburbs' streets, architecture, and nature and in ink, gouache, and lithography. He would go on to use pastels and paint, as well and later dabbled in abstraction. He made a living selling or trading his art with locals. On average, Bascoulard would make 1–3 pieces a day.

In 1937, his art was featured in the International Exhibition of Arts and Techniques in Paris.

Bascoulard began his series of photograph self-portraits in 1942, a practice which he would continue until his death. In these self portraits, he wears handmade gowns, often paired with parasols and handbags. He is quoted with saying: “If I sometimes walk around dressed like a woman, it’s because I find this apparel more aesthetic. For the purpose of art, [...] I put on women's clothing." These photos were taken by local friends and acquaintances. The dresses were designed by Bascoulard and tailored by local seamstresses.

Having a life-long interest in locomotives, Bascoulard took photographs of trains and drew maps. He also wrote poetry.

== Character ==
Bascoulard was a well known figure by the townspeople Bourges, though at the same time was outcast. He enjoyed riding around the town on a tricycle.

Bascoulard was defiant towards police and the German occupation. During World War II, he Germanized "Mulet" with an umlaut, making it "Mület," in mockery of the Nazis In 1942, he was suspected of espionage while drawing trains at a train station and was sent to Bordiot prison in Bourges. He was later arrested again in 1952 for cross-dressing. He was known to adorn his outfits with signs saying "screw society," which attracted further attention from authorities

In addition to French, Bascoulard also spoke German, English, Swedish, and Russian. He was known for having a photographic memory. He owned several cats which he took care of.

== Death ==
In 1978, Bascoulard was murdered by strangulation. His body was found in the vacant lot he had been living in Asnières-les-Bourges. 23-year-old Jean-Claude Simon was convicted for the murder, although some believe he was wrongly accused.

He is buried in the St. Lazare Cemetery in Bourges.

== Posthumous recognition ==
Bascoulard's work has been shown extensively in Europe. He has had exhibitions at Musée d’art moderne et contemporain in Saint-Etienne, the Fort Institute of Photography in Warsaw, Halle Saint Pierre in Paris; the Musée de Grenoble, Grenoble, the Punta della Dogana in the Pinault Collection, Venice, and during the Rencontres de la Photographie in Arles, France.

He was first shown in the United States in 2021, in the seminal exhibition Photo Brut at the American Folk Art Museum, and again in 2026.

In 1998, Bourges installed a bust of Bascoulard on a street named after him.
