= Lapan =

Lapan may refer to:

== People ==
- Ngala Lapan, Papua New Guinean rugby league player
- Pete Lapan (1891–1953), American baseball player

== Places ==
- Lapan, Cher, Centre-Val de Loire, France

== Other ==
- LAPAN or National Institute of Aeronautics and Space, Indonesian government space agency
