= Communauté d'agglomération Bourges Plus =

Coordinates: 47.08444°N 2.396388°E

Bourges Plus
- Communauté d'agglomération
- Country: France
- Region: Centre-Val de Loire
- Department: Cher
- No. of communes: {{{nbcomm}}}
- Established: 21 October 2002

Government
  - President: Pascal Blanc
- Area: 417.3 km^{2} (161.1 sq mi)
- Population (2018): 102,679
  - Density: 246.1/km^{2} (637.3/sq mi)
- Website: www.agglo-bourgesplus.fr

The Communauté d'agglomération Bourges Plus is the communauté d'agglomération, an intercommunal structure, centred on the city of Bourges. It is located in the Cher department, in the Centre-Val de Loire region, central France. It was created 21 October 2002. Its area is 417.3 km^{2}. Its population was 102,679 in 2018, of which 64,668 in Bourges proper.

== Composition ==
The communauté d'agglomération consists of the following 17 communes:

1. Annoix
2. Arçay
3. Berry-Bouy
4. Bourges
5. La Chapelle-Saint-Ursin
6. Le Subdray
7. Lissay-Lochy
8. Marmagne
9. Mehun-sur-Yèvre
10. Morthomiers
11. Plaimpied-Givaudins
12. Saint-Doulchard
13. Saint-Germain-du-Puy
14. Saint-Just
15. Saint-Michel-de-Volangis
16. Trouy
17. Vorly
