= Communauté de communes Arnon Boischaut Cher =

Federation of municipalities in France

Arnon Boischaut Cher
- Communauté de communes
- Interactive map of Arnon Boischaut Cher
- Coordinates: 46°51′N 02°20′E
- Country: France
- Region: Centre-Val de Loire
- Department: Cher
- No. of communes: {{{nbcomm}}}
- Established: 2011
- Area: 379.5 km^{2} (146.5 sq mi)
- Population (2018): 8,109
  - Density: 21.37/km^{2} (55.34/sq mi)
- Website: www.comcomabc.fr

The Communauté de communes Arnon Boischaut Cher is a communauté de communes, an intercommunal structure, in the Cher department, in the Centre-Val de Loire region, central France. It was created in January 2011 by the merger of the former communautés de communes Portes du Boischaut and Rives du Cher. Its area is 379.5 km^{2}, and its population was 8,109 in 2018. Its seat is in Châteauneuf-sur-Cher.

== Communes ==
The communauté de communes consists of the following 18 communes:

1. La Celle-Condé
2. Chambon
3. Châteauneuf-sur-Cher
4. Chavannes
5. Corquoy
6. Crézançay-sur-Cher
7. Lapan
8. Levet
9. Lignières
10. Montlouis
11. Saint-Baudel
12. Saint-Loup-des-Chaumes
13. Saint-Symphorien
14. Serruelles
15. Uzay-le-Venon
16. Vallenay
17. Venesmes
18. Villecelin
