= Saint-Hilaire-en-Lignières =

- Commune
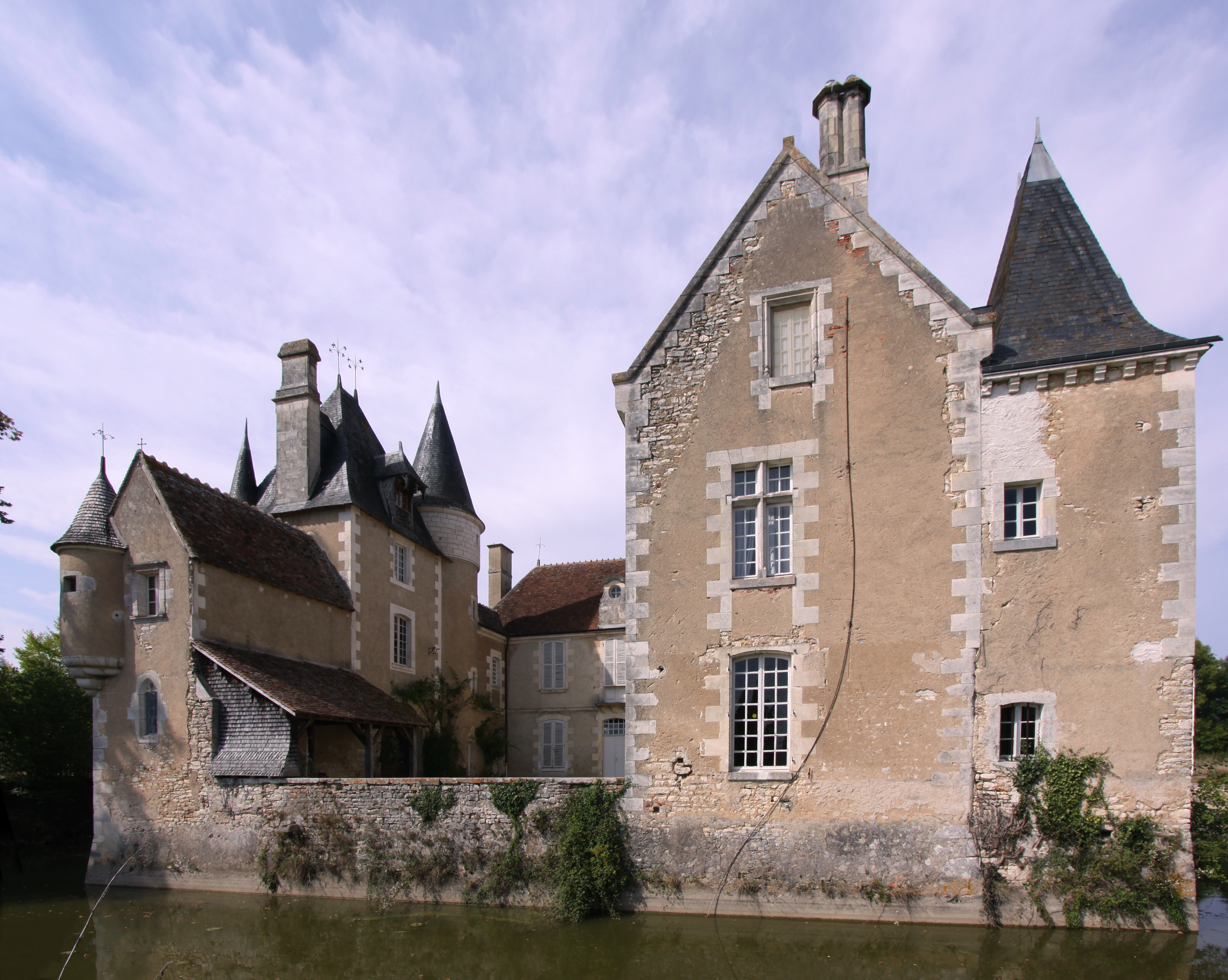
- The Château of Plaix

- Coat of arms
- Location of Saint-Hilaire-en-Lignières
- Location within France Location within Centre-Val de Loire
- Coordinates: 46°43′37″N 2°10′27″E
- Country: France
- Region: Centre-Val de Loire
- Department: Cher
- Arrondissement: Saint-Amand-Montrond
- Canton: Châteaumeillant

Government
  - Mayor (2020–2026): Francis Perrot
- Area^{1}: 53.78 km^{2} (20.76 sq mi)
- Elevation: 190 m (620 ft)
- Highest elevation: 268 m (879 ft)
- Lowest elevation: 159 m (522 ft)
- Population (2023): 504
  - Density: 9.37/km^{2} (24.3/sq mi)
- Time zone: UTC+01:00 (CET)
  - Summer (DST): UTC+02:00 (CEST)
- INSEE/Postal code: 18216 /18160
- ^{1} French Land Register data, which excludes lakes, ponds, glaciers > 1 km^{2} (0.386 sq mi or 247 acres) and river estuaries.

Saint-Hilaire-en-Lignières (French pronunciation: [sɛ̃t‿ilɛːʁ ɑ̃ liɲjɛʁ]; literally "Saint Hilarius in Lignières") is a commune in the Cher department in the Centre-Val de Loire region of France.

== Geography ==
A very large farming area comprising the village and several hamlets situated on the banks of the river Arnon, some 25 miles (40 km) southwest of Bourges at the junction of the D940 with the D65 and also on the D26 road. The commune shares its southwestern borders with the department of Indre.

== Population ==
Historical population
Year	Pop.	±% p.a.
1968	785	—
1975	650	−2.66%
1982	572	−1.81%
1990	534	−0.86%
1999	523	−0.23%
2007	512	−0.27%
2012	527	+0.58%
2017	491	−1.41%
2023	504	+0.44%
Source: INSEE

== Sights ==
- The church of St. Hilaire, dating from the twelfth century (Historic monument).
- The sixteenth-century chateau du Plaix (Historic monument).

== See also ==
- Communes of the Cher department
