= Chambon, Cher =

Chambon
- Commune
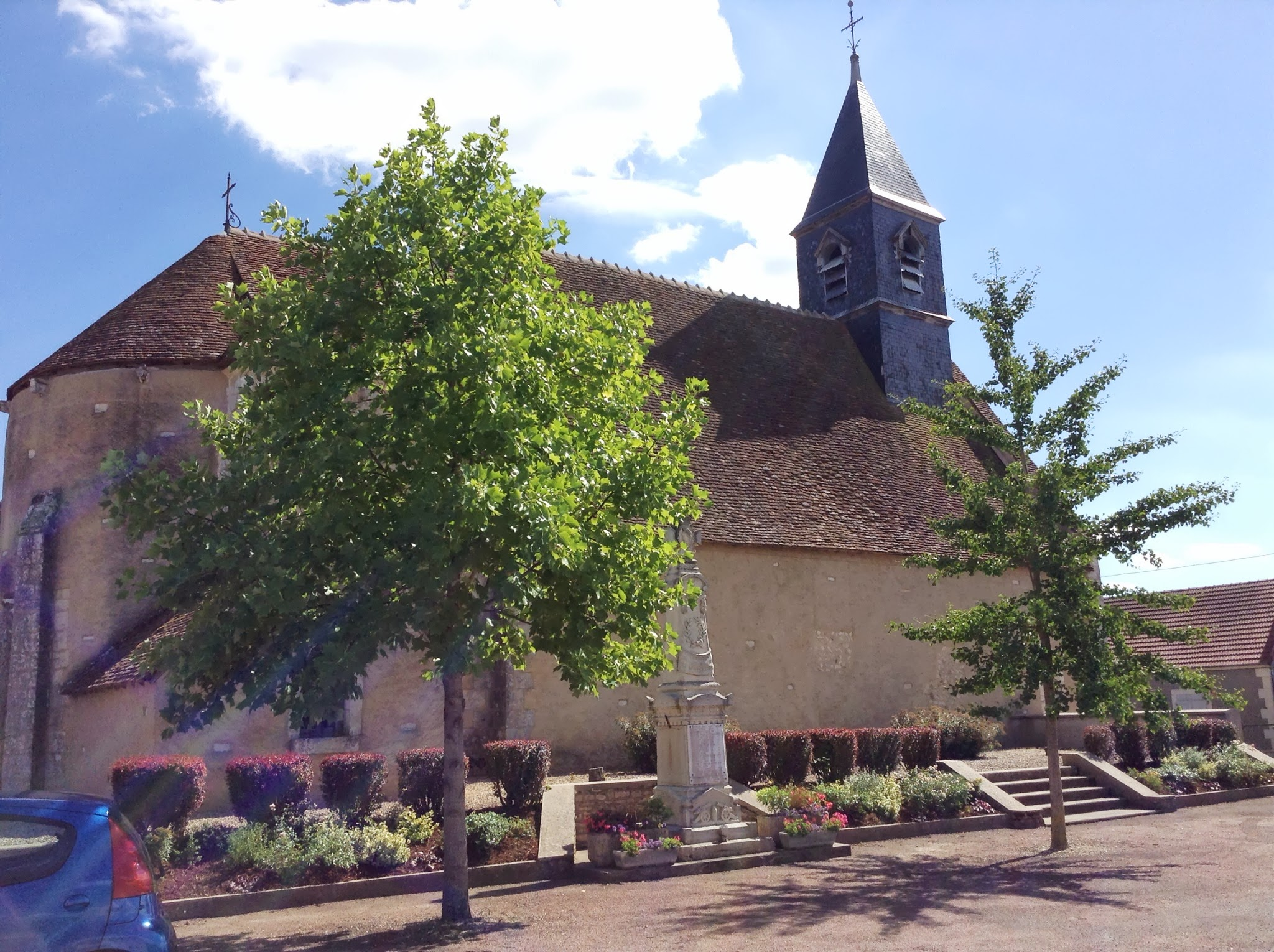
- The church of Saint-Pierre, in Chambon
- Location of Chambon
- Location within France Location within Centre-Val de Loire
- Coordinates: 46°47′16″N 2°19′32″E
- Country: France
- Region: Centre-Val de Loire
- Department: Cher
- Arrondissement: Saint-Amand-Montrond
- Canton: Trouy
- Intercommunality: CC Arnon Boischaut Cher

Government
  - Mayor (2020–2026): Maryse Jacquin-Salomon
- Area^{1}: 13.91 km^{2} (5.37 sq mi)
- Elevation: 170 m (560 ft)
- Highest elevation: 187 m (614 ft)
- Lowest elevation: 147 m (482 ft)
- Population (2023): 152
  - Density: 10.9/km^{2} (28.3/sq mi)
- Time zone: UTC+01:00 (CET)
  - Summer (DST): UTC+02:00 (CEST)
- INSEE/Postal code: 18046 /18190
- ^{1} French Land Register data, which excludes lakes, ponds, glaciers > 1 km^{2} (0.386 sq mi or 247 acres) and river estuaries.

Chambon (French pronunciation: [ʃɑ̃bɔ̃]) is a commune in the Cher department in the Centre-Val de Loire region of France.

== Geography ==
The town was a part of the canton of Châteauneuf-sur-Cher; in 2015, following the redistribution of the cantons of the department, it became a part of the canton of Trouy.

=== Typology ===
Chambon is a rural commune. It is a part of the municipalities with little or very little density, within the meaning of the municipal density grid of INSEE.

In addition, the municipality is part of the attraction area of Saint-Amand-Montrond, of which it is a municipality in the crown. This area, which includes 36 municipalities, is categorized into areas with fewer than 50,000 inhabitants.

=== Land use ===
The zoning of the municipality, as reflected in the database European occupation biophysical soil Corine Land Cover (CLC), is marked by the importance of the agricultural land (89.5% in 2018), a proportion roughly equivalent to that of 1990 (89.4%). The detailed breakdown in 2018 is as follows:

- grasslands (46.4%)
- arable land (43.1%)
- forests (10.5%)

== Politics and administration ==
List of Mayors
Period		Name
The missing data must be completed.
March 2001	March 2008	Louis Legrand
March 2008	January 2010	Gerard Lucas
February 2010	2014	Jean-Marie Brochard
April 2014	In progress	Maryse Jacquin-Salomon

=== Environmental policy ===
In its 2016 winners, the National Council of Flowered Cities and Villages of France awarded one flower to the municipality in Concours des villes et villages fleuris.

== Population ==
Historical population
Year	Pop.	±% p.a.
1968	231	—
1975	195	−2.39%
1982	143	−4.33%
1990	122	−1.97%
1999	134	+1.05%
2007	148	+1.25%
2012	164	+2.07%
2017	173	+1.07%
2023	152	−2.13%
Source: INSEE

== Sights ==
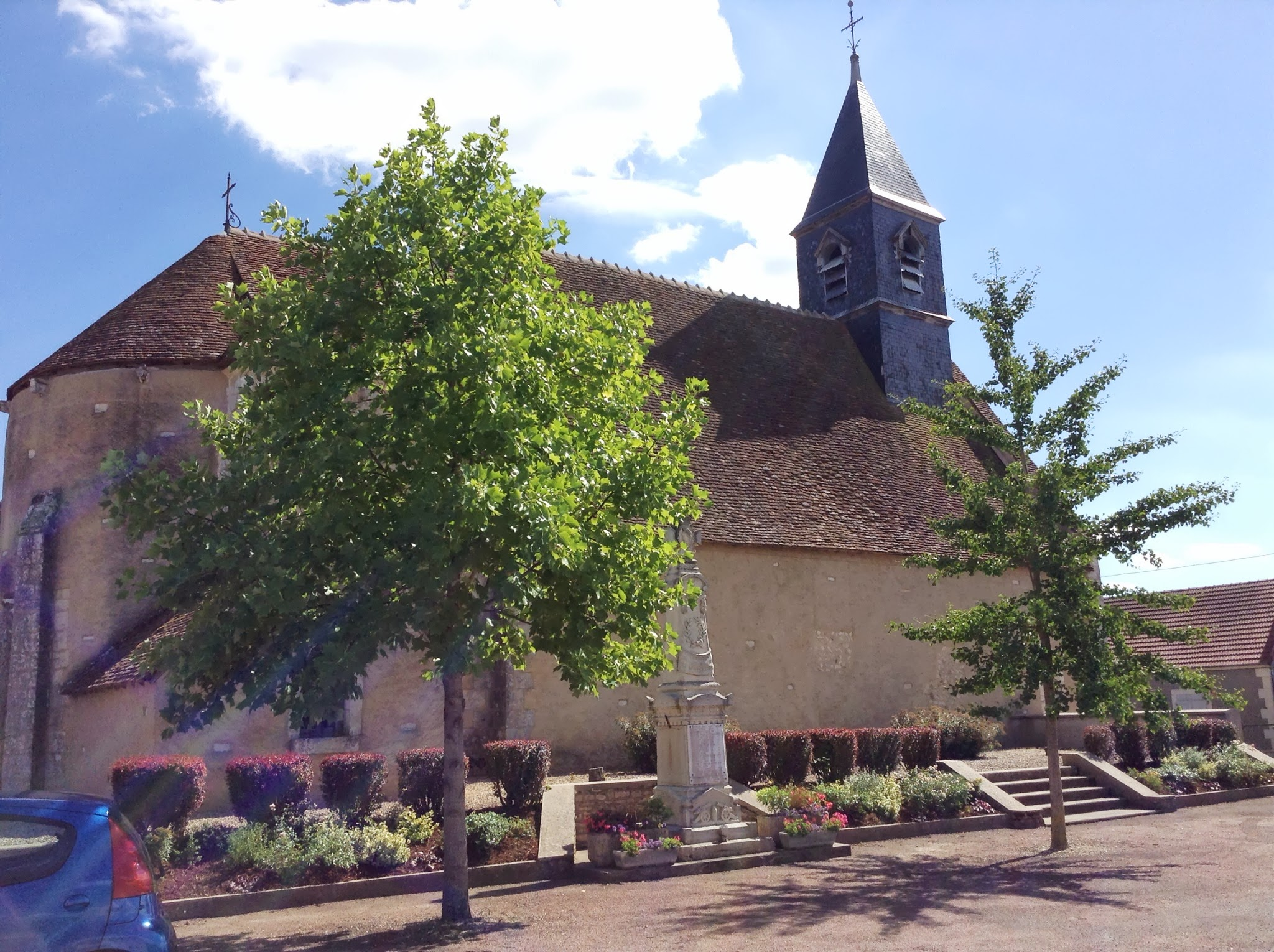
Church of Saint-Pierre

The Church of Saint-Pierre de Chambon has been listed as a historical monument since 1922.

== See also ==
- Communes of the Cher department
