= Plaimpied-Givaudins =

- Commune
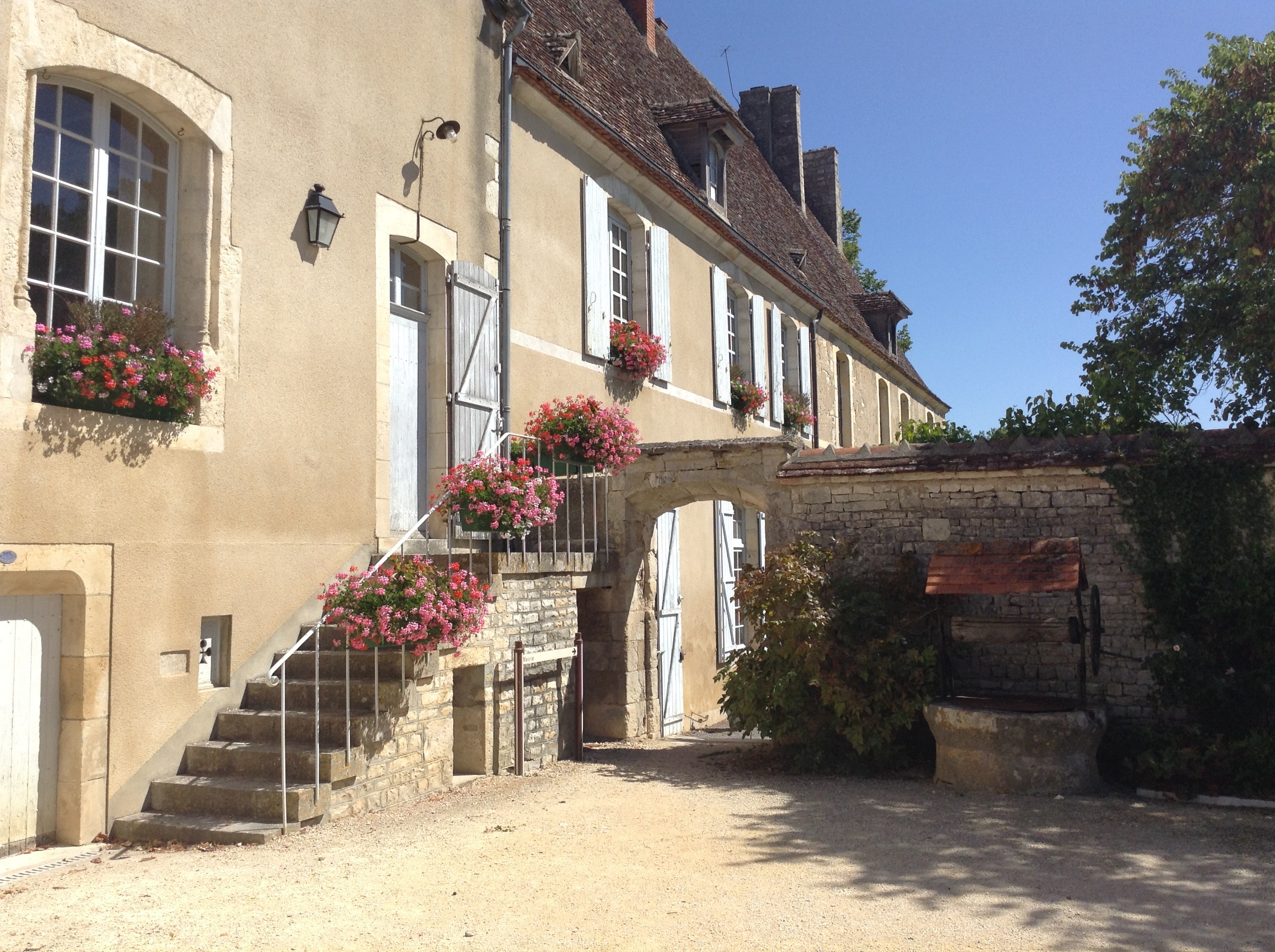

- Coat of arms
- Location of Plaimpied-Givaudins
- Location within France Location within Centre-Val de Loire
- Coordinates: 46°59′57″N 2°27′18″E
- Country: France
- Region: Centre-Val de Loire
- Department: Cher
- Arrondissement: Bourges
- Canton: Trouy
- Intercommunality: CA Bourges Plus

Government
  - Mayor (2020–2026): Patrick Barnier
- Area^{1}: 40.51 km^{2} (15.64 sq mi)
- Highest elevation: 177 m (581 ft)
- Lowest elevation: 128 m (420 ft)
- Population (2023): 2,101
  - Density: 51.86/km^{2} (134.3/sq mi)
- Time zone: UTC+01:00 (CET)
  - Summer (DST): UTC+02:00 (CEST)
- INSEE/Postal code: 18180 /18340
- ^{1} French Land Register data, which excludes lakes, ponds, glaciers > 1 km^{2} (0.386 sq mi or 247 acres) and river estuaries.

Plaimpied-Givaudins (French pronunciation: [plɛ̃pje ʒivodɛ̃]) is a commune in the Cher department in the Centre-Val de Loire region of France.

== Geography ==
A farming area comprising the two villages and several hamlets situated along the banks of the river Auron and the canal de Berry, immediately to the south of Bourges at the junction of the D106 with the N142 and with the D31 and the D46 roads.

The river has been dammed and has created an 82 hectares (200 acres) lake in the north of the commune.

== Population ==
Historical population
Year	Pop.	±% p.a.
1968	693	—
1975	853	+3.01%
1982	1,100	+3.70%
1990	1,388	+2.95%
1999	1,643	+1.89%
2007	1,678	+0.26%
2012	1,822	+1.66%
2017	1,999	+1.87%
2023	2,101	+0.83%
Source: INSEE

== Sights ==
- The abbey church of St. Martin, dating from the eleventh century.
- The chateau du Porche.
- The fourteenth-century gatehouse of the old abbey.
- Remains of a Roman aqueduct at Saint-Ladre.

== See also ==
- Communes of the Cher department
