= Sainte-Lunaise =

- Part of Corquoy
- Location of Sainte-Lunaise
- Location within France Location within Centre-Val de Loire
- Coordinates: 46°55′16″N 2°20′57″E
- Country: France
- Region: Centre-Val de Loire
- Department: Cher
- Arrondissement: Bourges
- Canton: Trouy
- Commune: Corquoy
- Area^{1}: 13.95 km^{2} (5.39 sq mi)
- Elevation: 172 m (564 ft)
- Highest elevation: 179 m (587 ft)
- Lowest elevation: 145 m (476 ft)
- Population (2016): 17
  - Density: 1.2/km^{2} (3.2/sq mi)
- Time zone: UTC+01:00 (CET)
  - Summer (DST): UTC+02:00 (CEST)
- Postal code: 18340
- ^{1} French Land Register data, which excludes lakes, ponds, glaciers > 1 km^{2} (0.386 sq mi or 247 acres) and river estuaries.

Sainte-Lunaise (French pronunciation: [sɛ̃t lynɛːz]) is a former commune in the Cher department in central France. On 1 January 2019, it was merged into the commune Corquoy.

== See also ==
- Communes of the Cher department
