= Arçay, Cher =

Arçay
- Commune
- The main square in Arçay

- Coat of arms
- Location of Arçay
- Location within France Location within Centre-Val de Loire
- Coordinates: 46°56′57″N 2°20′28″E
- Country: France
- Region: Centre-Val de Loire
- Department: Cher
- Arrondissement: Bourges
- Canton: Trouy
- Intercommunality: Bourges Plus

Government
  - Mayor (2020–2026): Stéphane Hamelin
- Area^{1}: 18.32 km^{2} (7.07 sq mi)
- Highest elevation: 174 m (571 ft)
- Lowest elevation: 145 m (476 ft)
- Population (2023): 500
  - Density: 27/km^{2} (71/sq mi)
- Time zone: UTC+01:00 (CET)
  - Summer (DST): UTC+02:00 (CEST)
- INSEE/Postal code: 18008 /18340
- ^{1} French Land Register data, which excludes lakes, ponds, glaciers > 1 km^{2} (0.386 sq mi or 247 acres) and river estuaries.

Arçay (French pronunciation: [aʁsɛ]) is a commune in the Cher department, Centre-Val de Loire, France.

== Geography ==
A farming area comprising the village and several hamlets situated some 12 miles (19 km) south of Bourges at the junction of the D88, D28 and the D73 roads.

== Population ==
The inhabitants are called Arcéens or Arcéennes in French.

Historical population
Year	Pop.	±% p.a.
1968	258	—
1975	222	−2.12%
1982	337	+6.14%
1990	378	+1.45%
1999	377	−0.03%
2007	476	+2.96%
2012	529	+2.13%
2017	510	−0.73%
2023	500	−0.33%
Source: INSEE

== Places of interest ==
- The church of St.Sylvain, dating from the nineteenth century.
- The nineteenth-century château Belair.

== See also ==
- Communes of the Cher department
