= Annoix =

- Commune
- Coat of arms
- Location of Annoix
- Location within France Location within Centre-Val de Loire
- Coordinates: 46°57′39″N 2°32′06″E
- Country: France
- Region: Centre-Val de Loire
- Department: Cher
- Arrondissement: Bourges
- Canton: Trouy
- Intercommunality: Bourges Plus

Government
  - Mayor (2020–2026): Alain Mazé
- Area^{1}: 11.79 km^{2} (4.55 sq mi)
- Elevation: 175 m (574 ft)
- Highest elevation: 179 m (587 ft)
- Lowest elevation: 142 m (466 ft)
- Population (2023): 250
  - Density: 21/km^{2} (55/sq mi)
- Time zone: UTC+01:00 (CET)
  - Summer (DST): UTC+02:00 (CEST)
- INSEE/Postal code: 18006 /18340
- ^{1} French Land Register data, which excludes lakes, ponds, glaciers > 1 km^{2} (0.386 sq mi or 247 acres) and river estuaries.

Annoix (French pronunciation: [anwa]) is a commune in the Cher department in the Centre-Val de Loire region of France.

== Geography ==
A farming area comprising the village and a hamlet situated by the banks of the river Auron some 12 miles (19 km) southeast of Bourges, at the junction of the D119, D953 and the D2076 roads.

== Population ==
Historical population
Year	Pop.	±% p.a.
1968	189	—
1975	221	+2.26%
1982	286	+3.75%
1990	282	−0.18%
1999	263	−0.77%
2007	229	−1.72%
2012	232	+0.26%
2017	233	+0.09%
2023	250	+1.18%
Source: INSEE

== Sights ==
- The church of St.Pierre, dating from the twelfth century and restored between 1837 and 1840.
- The remains of a Roman aqueduct.
- An old watermill.
- The Château Gaillard.

== See also ==
- Communes of the Cher department
