= Trouy =

- Commune
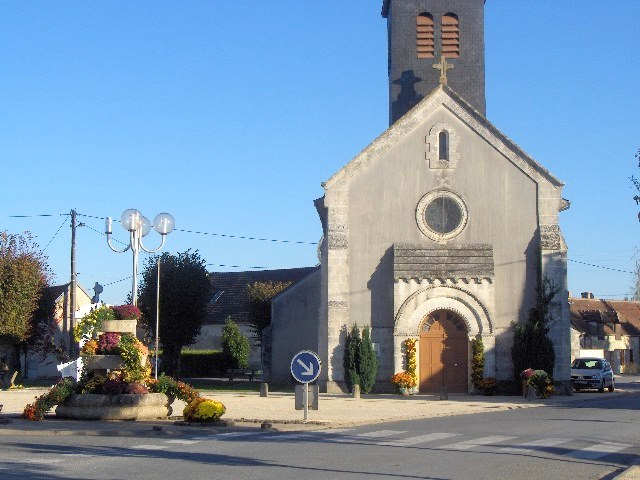
- The church in Trouy

- Coat of arms
- Location of Trouy
- Location within France Location within Centre-Val de Loire
- Coordinates: 47°00′40″N 2°21′30″E
- Country: France
- Region: Centre-Val de Loire
- Department: Cher
- Arrondissement: Bourges
- Canton: Trouy
- Intercommunality: CA Bourges Plus

Government
  - Mayor (2020–2026): Franck Breteau
- Area^{1}: 23.19 km^{2} (8.95 sq mi)
- Highest elevation: 174 m (571 ft)
- Lowest elevation: 133 m (436 ft)
- Population (2023): 4,055
  - Density: 174.9/km^{2} (452.9/sq mi)
- Time zone: UTC+01:00 (CET)
  - Summer (DST): UTC+02:00 (CEST)
- INSEE/Postal code: 18267 /18570
- ^{1} French Land Register data, which excludes lakes, ponds, glaciers > 1 km^{2} (0.386 sq mi or 247 acres) and river estuaries.

Trouy (French pronunciation: [tʁui]) is a commune in the Cher department in the Centre-Val de Loire region of France.

== Geography ==
An area of farming and a little light industry, comprising the village, several hamlets and a suburb situated just 4 miles (6.4 km) south of Bourges city centre, at the junction of the D31, D73 and the D107 roads. The A71 autoroute passes through the commune along with the N144 and N142 roads.

== Population ==
Historical population
Year	Pop.	±% p.a.
1968	785	—
1975	2,132	+15.34%
1982	2,845	+4.21%
1990	2,877	+0.14%
1999	2,978	+0.38%
2007	3,826	+3.18%
2012	3,890	+0.33%
2017	3,959	+0.35%
2023	4,055	+0.40%
Source: INSEE

== Sights ==
- The church of St. Pierre, dating from the twelfth century.
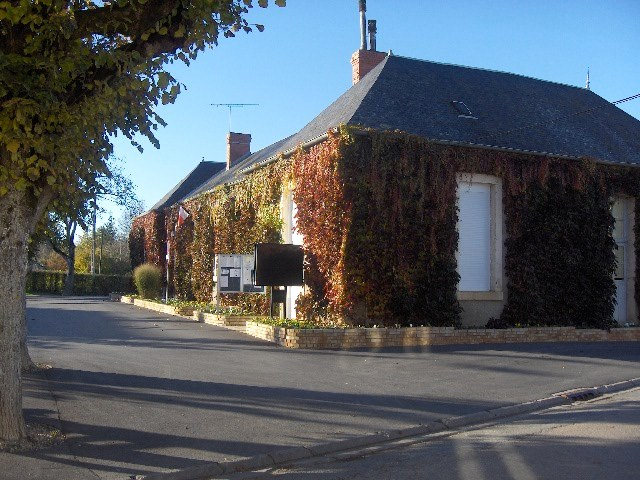
The mairie

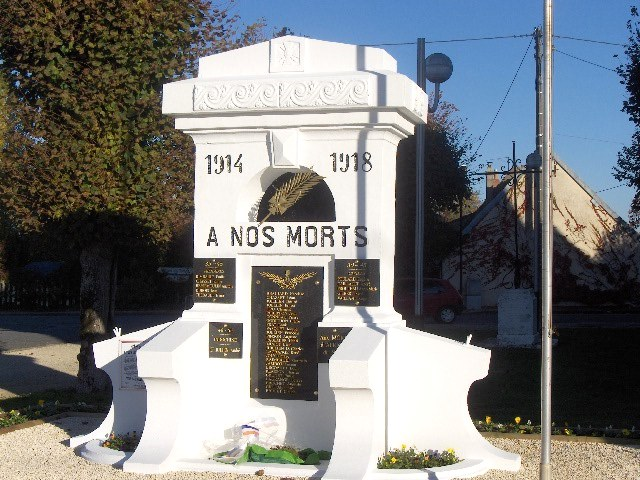
The war memorial

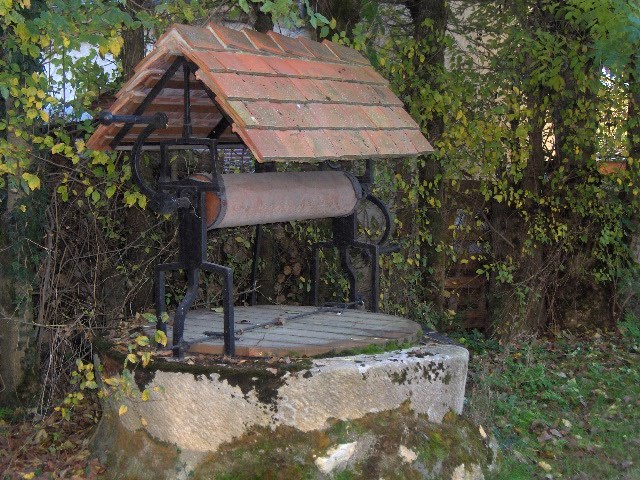
The well, on the rue du Mai

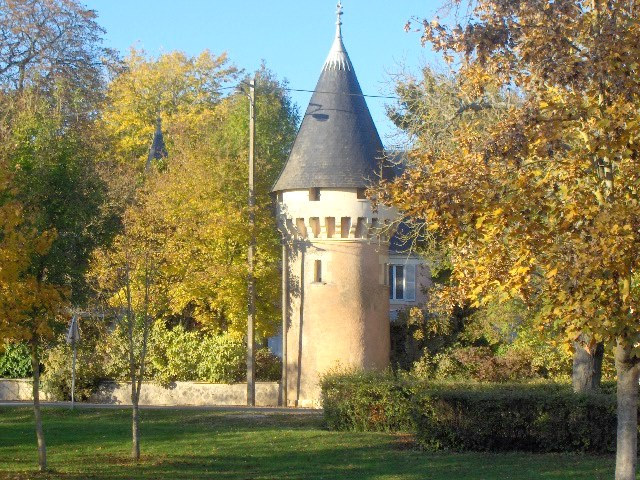
The chateau

== See also ==
- Communes of the Cher department
