= Saint-Just, Cher =

Saint-Just
- Commune
- Coat of arms
- Location of Saint-Just
- Location within France Location within Centre-Val de Loire
- Coordinates: 46°59′38″N 2°30′34″E
- Country: France
- Region: Centre-Val de Loire
- Department: Cher
- Arrondissement: Bourges
- Canton: Trouy
- Intercommunality: CA Bourges Plus

Government
  - Mayor (2020–2026): Stéphane Garcia
- Area^{1}: 15.12 km^{2} (5.84 sq mi)
- Highest elevation: 179 m (587 ft)
- Lowest elevation: 141 m (463 ft)
- Population (2023): 656
  - Density: 43.4/km^{2} (112/sq mi)
- Time zone: UTC+01:00 (CET)
  - Summer (DST): UTC+02:00 (CEST)
- INSEE/Postal code: 18218 /18340
- ^{1} French Land Register data, which excludes lakes, ponds, glaciers > 1 km^{2} (0.386 sq mi or 247 acres) and river estuaries.

Saint-Just (French pronunciation: [sɛ̃ ʒy(st)]) is a commune in the Cher department in the Centre-Val de Loire region of France.

== Geography ==
A farming area comprising the village and several hamlets situated by the banks of the canal de Berry and the river Auron, about 7 miles (11 km) southeast of Bourges at the junction of the D2076 with the D46e and on the D106 road.

== Population ==
Historical population
Year	Pop.	±% p.a.
1968	522	—
1975	534	+0.33%
1982	558	+0.63%
1990	589	+0.68%
1999	558	−0.60%
2007	586	+0.61%
2012	609	+0.77%
2017	643	+1.09%
2023	656	+0.33%
Source: INSEE

== Sights ==
- The church of St. Just, dating from the twelfth century.
- The chateau de Boisvert, built in the seventeenth century.
- The fourteenth-century castle of Chambon.
- The remains of a Roman aqueduct.

== See also ==
- Communes of the Cher department
