= Crézançay-sur-Cher =

- Commune
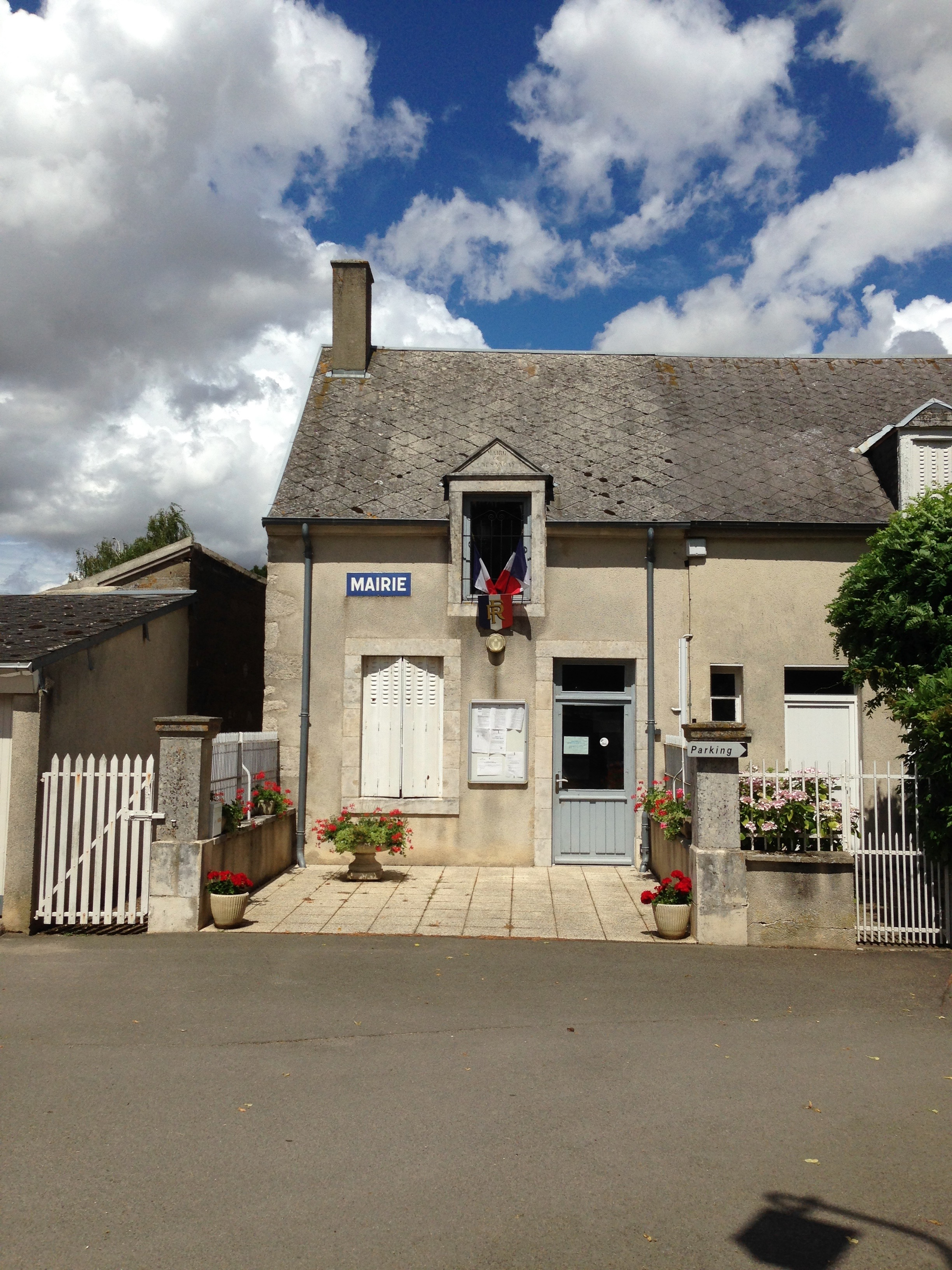
- Town hall
- Location of Crézançay-sur-Cher
- Location within France Location within Centre-Val de Loire
- Coordinates: 46°48′48″N 2°21′30″E
- Country: France
- Region: Centre-Val de Loire
- Department: Cher
- Arrondissement: Saint-Amand-Montrond
- Canton: Trouy
- Intercommunality: CC Arnon Boischaut Cher

Government
  - Mayor (2020–2026): Éric Baillard
- Area^{1}: 7.65 km^{2} (2.95 sq mi)
- Elevation: 145 m (476 ft)
- Highest elevation: 177 m (581 ft)
- Lowest elevation: 133 m (436 ft)
- Population (2023): 61
  - Density: 8.0/km^{2} (21/sq mi)
- Time zone: UTC+01:00 (CET)
  - Summer (DST): UTC+02:00 (CEST)
- INSEE/Postal code: 18078 /18190
- ^{1} French Land Register data, which excludes lakes, ponds, glaciers > 1 km^{2} (0.386 sq mi or 247 acres) and river estuaries.

Crézançay-sur-Cher (French pronunciation: [kʁezɑ̃sɛ syʁ ʃɛʁ], literally Crézançay on Cher) is a commune in the Cher department in the Centre-Val de Loire region of France.

== Geography ==
A very small farming and forestry village situated by the banks of both the Cher and the small river Trian, some 20 miles (32 km) south of Bourges near the junction of the D145 with the D3 road.

== Population ==
Historical population
Year	Pop.	±% p.a.
1968	100	—
1975	89	−1.65%
1982	73	−2.79%
1990	61	−2.22%
1999	56	−0.95%
2007	66	+2.08%
2012	64	−0.61%
2017	56	−2.64%
2023	61	+1.44%
Source: INSEE

== Sights ==
- The eighteenth-century church.

== See also ==
- Communes of the Cher department
