= Corquoy =

- Commune
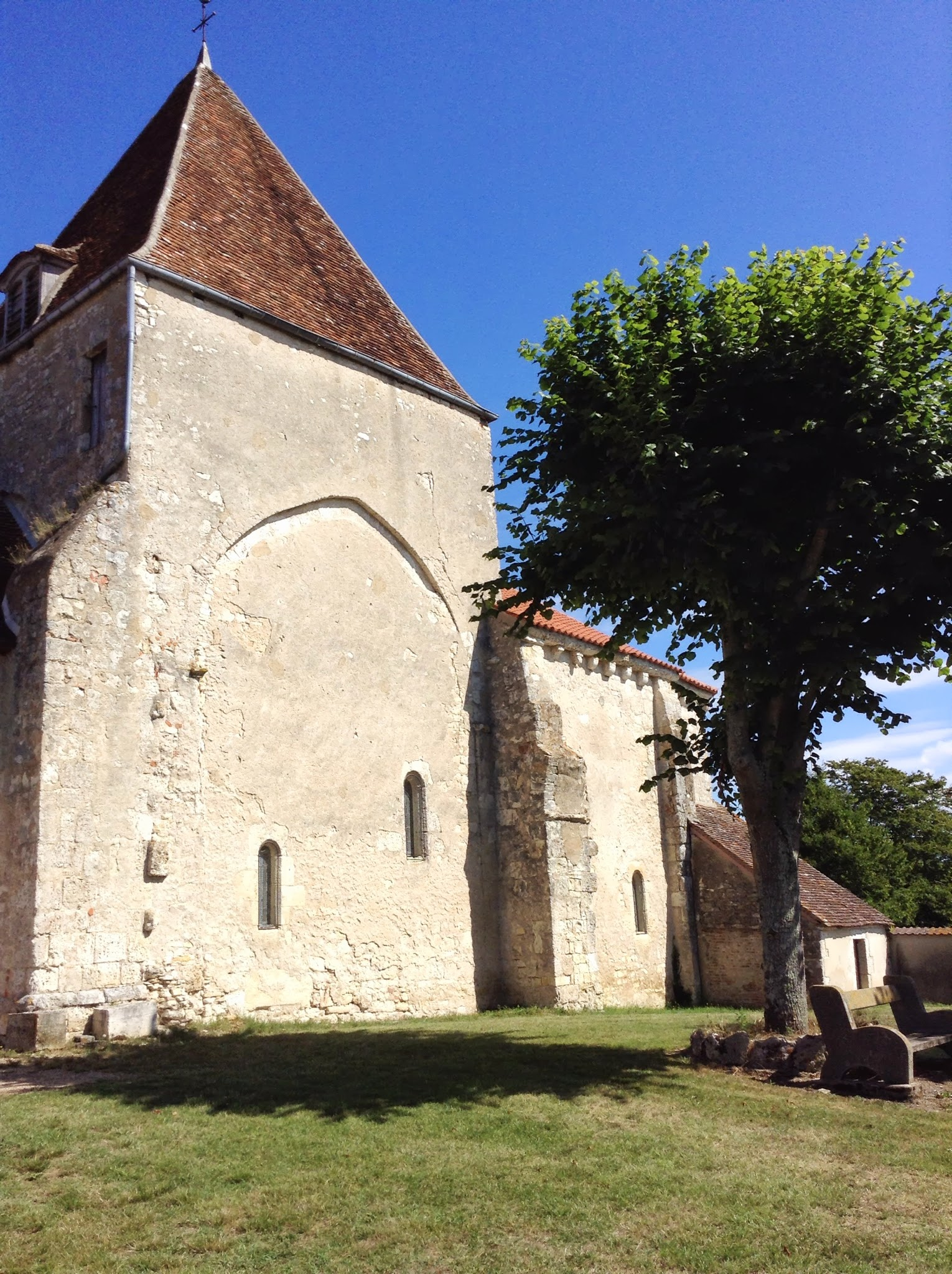
- The church of Saint-Martin, in Corquoy
- Location of Corquoy
- Location within France Location within Centre-Val de Loire
- Coordinates: 46°53′54″N 2°17′34″E
- Country: France
- Region: Centre-Val de Loire
- Department: Cher
- Arrondissement: Saint-Amand-Montrond
- Canton: Trouy
- Intercommunality: CC Arnon Boischaut Cher

Government
  - Mayor (2020–2026): Dominique Burlaud
- Area^{1}: 36.57 km^{2} (14.12 sq mi)
- Highest elevation: 179 m (587 ft)
- Lowest elevation: 128 m (420 ft)
- Population (2023): 198
  - Density: 5.41/km^{2} (14.0/sq mi)
- Time zone: UTC+01:00 (CET)
  - Summer (DST): UTC+02:00 (CEST)
- INSEE/Postal code: 18073 /18190
- ^{1} French Land Register data, which excludes lakes, ponds, glaciers > 1 km^{2} (0.386 sq mi or 247 acres) and river estuaries.

Corquoy (French pronunciation: [kɔʁkwa]) is a commune in the Cher department in the Centre-Val de Loire region of France. On 1 January 2019, the former commune Sainte-Lunaise was merged into Corquoy.

== Geography ==
An area of farming and forestry comprising a village and two hamlets situated in the Cher valley some 15 miles (24 km) south of Bourges on the D35 and the D27 roads.

== Population ==
Historical population
Year	Pop.	±% p.a.
1968	293	—
1975	253	−2.08%
1982	252	−0.06%
1990	265	+0.63%
1999	230	−1.56%
2007	258	+1.45%
2012	261	+0.23%
2017	209	−4.35%
2023	198	−0.90%
Source: INSEE

== Sights ==
- The twelfth-century church of St. Martin.
- The thirteenth-century chapel of the old priory of Grandmont.

== See also ==
- Communes of the Cher department
