= Senneçay =

- Commune
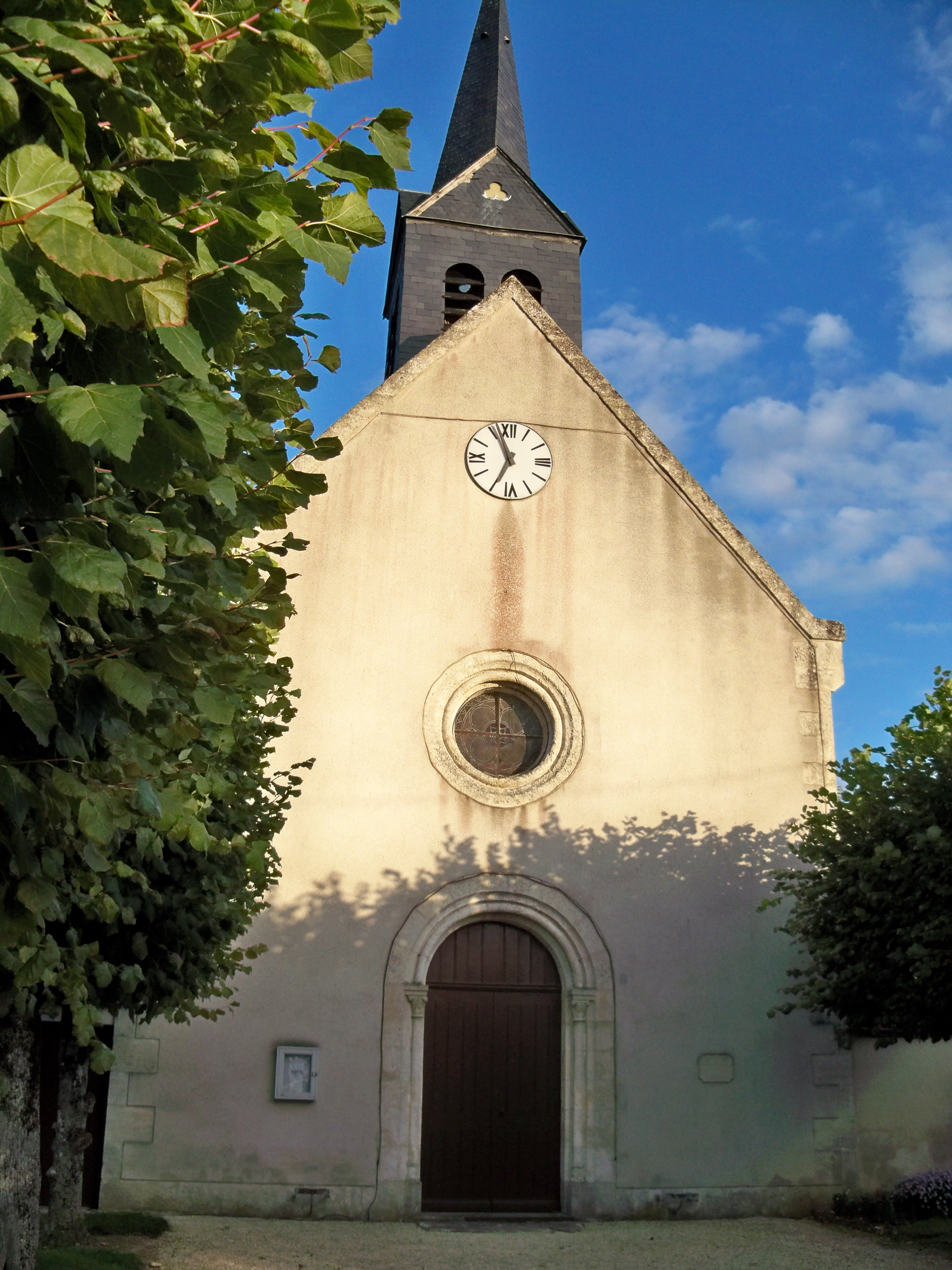
- The church in Senneçay

- Coat of arms
- Location of Senneçay
- Location within France Location within Centre-Val de Loire
- Coordinates: 46°57′07″N 2°26′16″E
- Country: France
- Region: Centre-Val de Loire
- Department: Cher
- Arrondissement: Bourges
- Canton: Trouy
- Intercommunality: CC Le Dunois

Government
  - Mayor (2020–2026): Irène Thibault
- Area^{1}: 14.47 km^{2} (5.59 sq mi)
- Elevation: 172 m (564 ft)
- Highest elevation: 181 m (594 ft)
- Lowest elevation: 154 m (505 ft)
- Population (2023): 443
  - Density: 30.6/km^{2} (79.3/sq mi)
- Time zone: UTC+01:00 (CET)
  - Summer (DST): UTC+02:00 (CEST)
- INSEE/Postal code: 18248 /18340
- ^{1} French Land Register data, which excludes lakes, ponds, glaciers > 1 km^{2} (0.386 sq mi or 247 acres) and river estuaries.

Senneçay (French pronunciation: [sɛnsɛ]) is a commune in the Cher department in the Centre-Val de Loire region of France.

== Geography ==
Senneçay is a farming village situated about 10 miles (16 km) south of Bourges, at the junction of the D46 and the D34 roads. The A71 autoroute forms the commune's western border.

== Population ==
Historical population
Year	Pop.	±% p.a.
1968	328	—
1975	288	−1.84%
1982	258	−1.56%
1990	347	+3.77%
1999	345	−0.06%
2007	431	+2.82%
2012	458	+1.22%
2017	472	+0.60%
2023	443	−1.05%
Source: INSEE

== Sights ==
- The church of St. Pierre, dating from the thirteenth century.

== See also ==
- Communes of the Cher department
