= La Celle-Condé =

- Commune
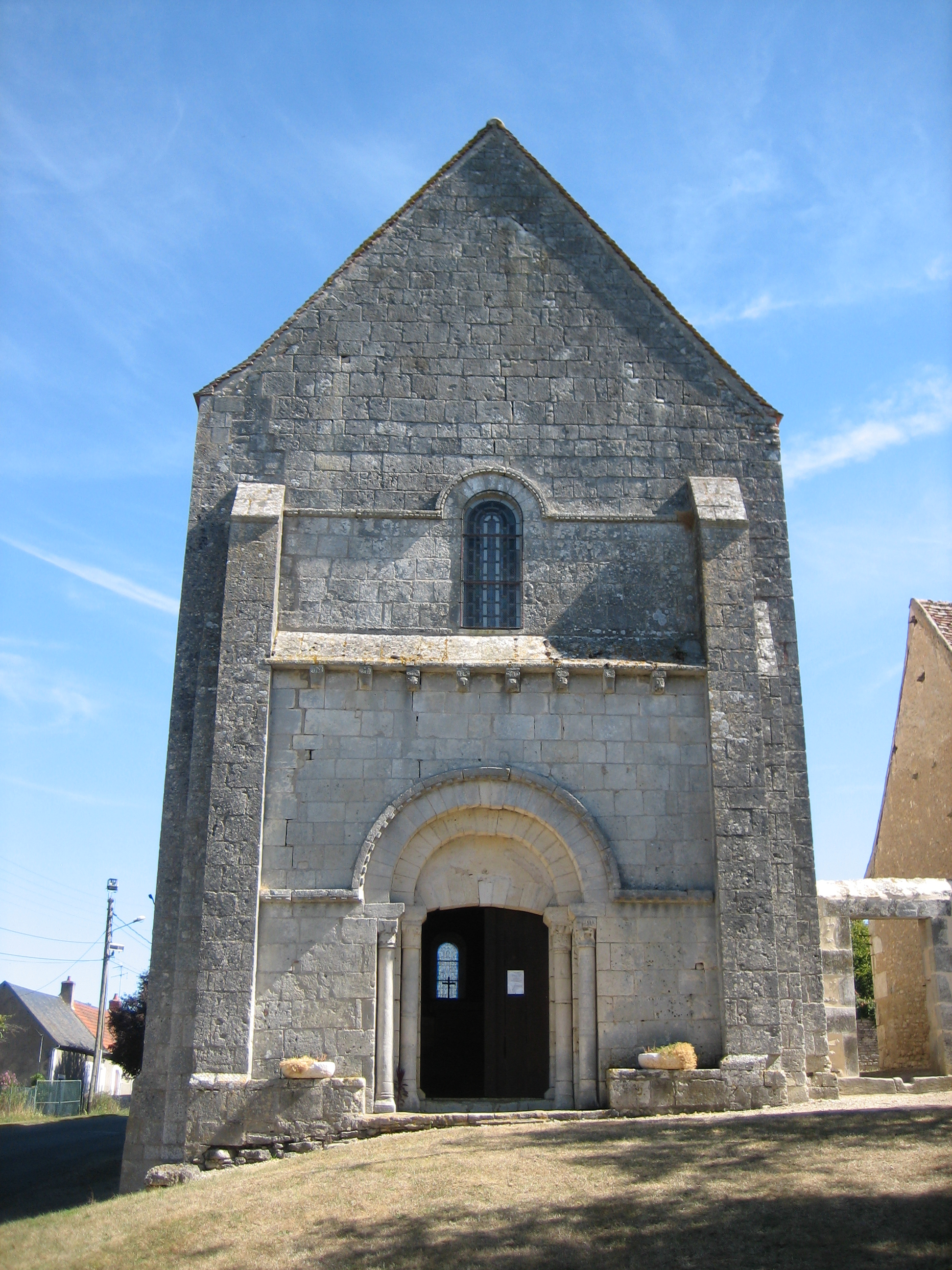
- The church of Saint-Denis, in La Celle-Condé
- Location of La Celle-Condé
- Location within France Location within Centre-Val de Loire
- Coordinates: 46°47′41″N 2°11′07″E
- Country: France
- Region: Centre-Val de Loire
- Department: Cher
- Arrondissement: Saint-Amand-Montrond
- Canton: Châteaumeillant
- Intercommunality: CC Arnon Boischaut Cher

Government
  - Mayor (2021–2026): Daniel Gaillard
- Area^{1}: 30.94 km^{2} (11.95 sq mi)
- Elevation: 123 m (404 ft)
- Highest elevation: 198 m (650 ft)
- Lowest elevation: 147 m (482 ft)
- Population (2023): 189
  - Density: 6.11/km^{2} (15.8/sq mi)
- Time zone: UTC+01:00 (CET)
  - Summer (DST): UTC+02:00 (CEST)
- INSEE/Postal code: 18043 /18160
- ^{1} French Land Register data, which excludes lakes, ponds, glaciers > 1 km^{2} (0.386 sq mi or 247 acres) and river estuaries.

La Celle-Condé (French pronunciation: [la sɛl kɔ̃de]) is a commune in the Cher department in the Centre-Val de Loire region of France.

== Geography ==
A farming area comprising the village and several hamlets situated in the valley of the river Arnon, some 24 miles (39 km) southwest of Bourges at the junction of the D219, D192 and the D69 roads.

== Population ==
Historical population
Year	Pop.	±% p.a.
1968	323	—
1975	253	−3.43%
1982	217	−2.17%
1990	181	−2.24%
1999	180	−0.06%
2007	201	+1.39%
2012	208	+0.69%
2017	202	−0.58%
2023	189	−1.10%
Source: INSEE

== Sights ==
- A fifteenth-century stone cross
- The church of St. Denis, dating from the eleventh century
- A fifteenth century manorhouse
- The priory church of Saint-Germain
- A seventeenth century presbytery

== See also ==
- Communes of the Cher department
