= Levet, Cher =

Levet
- Commune
- Coat of arms
- Location of Levet
- Location within France Location within Centre-Val de Loire
- Coordinates: 46°55′36″N 2°24′34″E
- Country: France
- Region: Centre-Val de Loire
- Department: Cher
- Arrondissement: Bourges
- Canton: Trouy
- Intercommunality: CC Arnon Boischaut Cher

Government
  - Mayor (2020–2026): Bruno Marechal
- Area^{1}: 25.97 km^{2} (10.03 sq mi)
- Elevation: 171 m (561 ft)
- Highest elevation: 181 m (594 ft)
- Lowest elevation: 159 m (522 ft)
- Population (2023): 1,357
  - Density: 52.25/km^{2} (135.3/sq mi)
- Time zone: UTC+01:00 (CET)
  - Summer (DST): UTC+02:00 (CEST)
- INSEE/Postal code: 18126 /18340
- ^{1} French Land Register data, which excludes lakes, ponds, glaciers > 1 km^{2} (0.386 sq mi or 247 acres) and river estuaries.

Levet (French pronunciation: [ləvɛ]) is a commune in the Cher department in the Centre-Val de Loire region of France.

== Geography ==
A farming area comprising a small town and several small hamlets situated by the banks of the Rampenne river, some 11 miles (18 km) south of Bourges, at the junction of the D940, D2144, D28 and the D88 roads. The A71 autoroute passes through the commune.

== Population ==
Historical population
Year	Pop.	±% p.a.
1968	992	—
1975	1,108	+1.59%
1982	1,266	+1.92%
1990	1,342	+0.73%
1999	1,269	−0.62%
2007	1,319	+0.48%
2012	1,373	+0.81%
2017	1,392	+0.28%
2023	1,357	−0.42%
Source: INSEE

== Sights ==
- A sixteenth-century house.
- The church, dating from the nineteenth century.
- A modern chateau of Soulangy.

== See also ==
- Communes of the Cher department
