= Venesmes =

- Commune
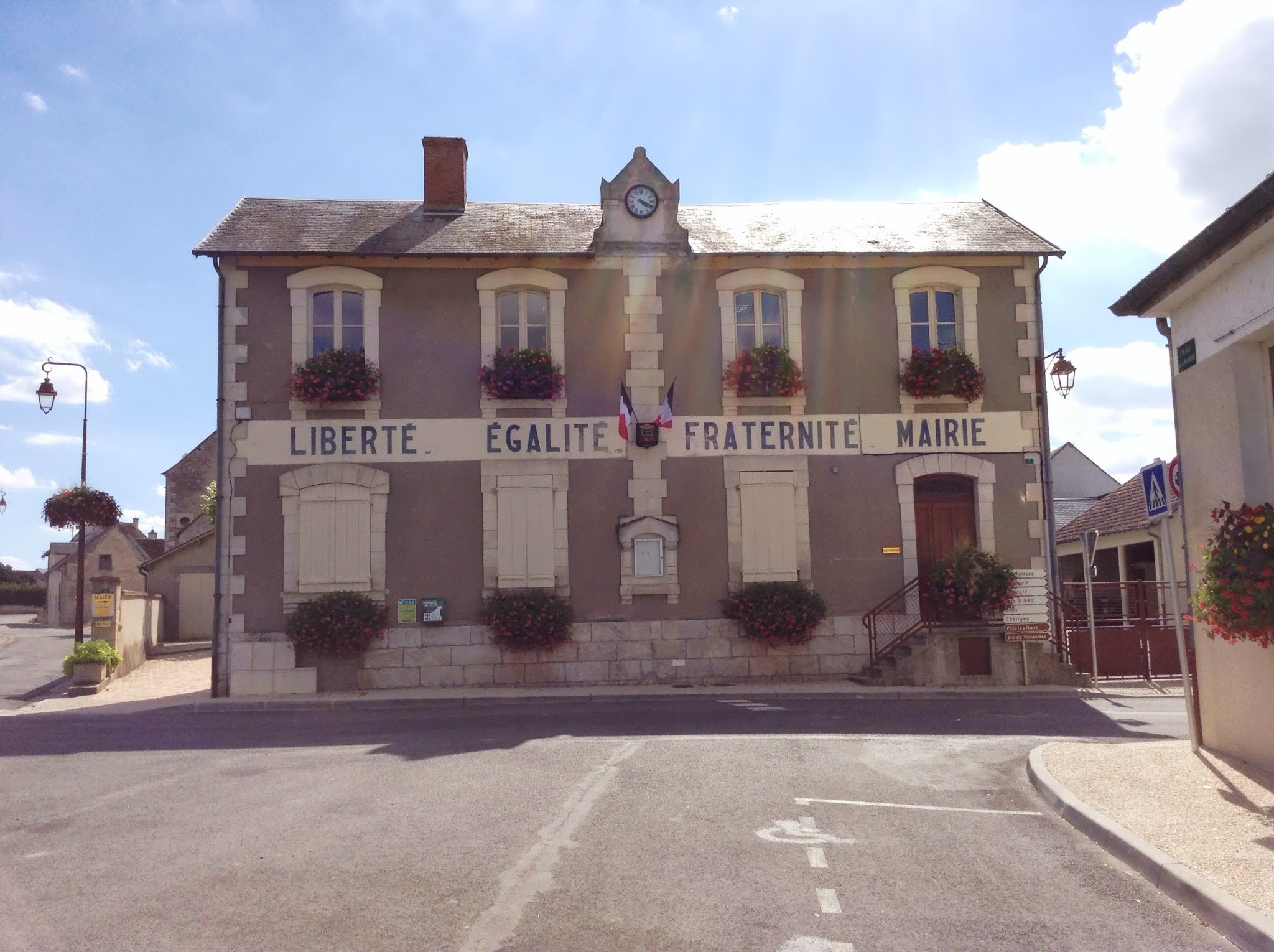
- The town hall in Venesmes

- Coat of arms
- Location of Venesmes
- Location within France Location within Centre-Val de Loire
- Coordinates: 46°50′24″N 2°18′51″E
- Country: France
- Region: Centre-Val de Loire
- Department: Cher
- Arrondissement: Saint-Amand-Montrond
- Canton: Trouy
- Intercommunality: CC Arnon Boischaut Cher

Government
  - Mayor (2020–2026): Gérard Bedouillat
- Area^{1}: 31.76 km^{2} (12.26 sq mi)
- Elevation: 148 m (486 ft)
- Highest elevation: 188 m (617 ft)
- Lowest elevation: 131 m (430 ft)
- Population (2023): 782
  - Density: 24.6/km^{2} (63.8/sq mi)
- Time zone: UTC+01:00 (CET)
  - Summer (DST): UTC+02:00 (CEST)
- INSEE/Postal code: 18273 /18190
- ^{1} French Land Register data, which excludes lakes, ponds, glaciers > 1 km^{2} (0.386 sq mi or 247 acres) and river estuaries.

Venesmes (French pronunciation: [vənɛm]) is a commune in the Cher department in the Centre-Val de Loire region of France.

== Geography ==
An area of forestry and farming comprising the village and several hamlets situated in the valley of the river Cher, about 17 miles (27 km) south of Bourges at the junction of the D14, D73 and the D940 roads.

== Population ==
Historical population
Year	Pop.	±% p.a.
1968	618	—
1975	689	+1.57%
1982	669	−0.42%
1990	714	+0.82%
1999	739	+0.38%
2007	867	+2.02%
2012	862	−0.12%
2017	821	−0.97%
2023	782	−0.81%
Source: INSEE

== Sights ==
- The church of St. Pierre, dating from the twelfth century.
- The ruins of the fifteenth-century castle of Aigues-Mortes.

== See also ==
- Communes of the Cher department
