= Saint-Loup-des-Chaumes =

- Commune
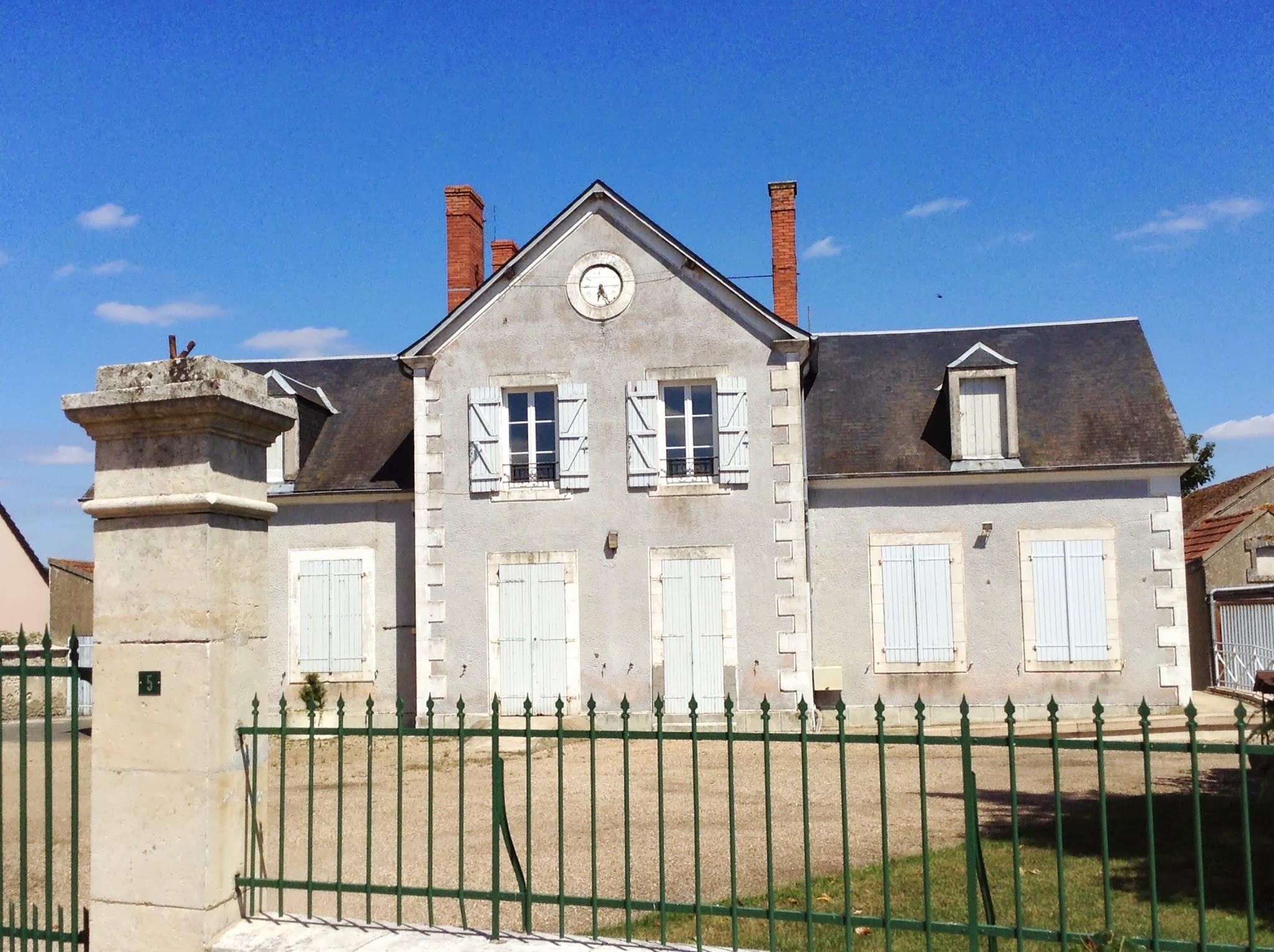
- The old town hall in Saint-Loup-des-Chaumes
- Location of Saint-Loup-des-Chaumes
- Location within France Location within Centre-Val de Loire
- Coordinates: 46°49′31″N 2°23′24″E
- Country: France
- Region: Centre-Val de Loire
- Department: Cher
- Arrondissement: Saint-Amand-Montrond
- Canton: Trouy
- Intercommunality: CC Arnon Boischaut Cher

Government
  - Mayor (2020–2026): Philippe Moisson
- Area^{1}: 18.55 km^{2} (7.16 sq mi)
- Elevation: 200 m (660 ft)
- Highest elevation: 177 m (581 ft)
- Lowest elevation: 133 m (436 ft)
- Population (2023): 279
  - Density: 15.0/km^{2} (39.0/sq mi)
- Time zone: UTC+01:00 (CET)
  - Summer (DST): UTC+02:00 (CEST)
- INSEE/Postal code: 18221 /18190
- ^{1} French Land Register data, which excludes lakes, ponds, glaciers > 1 km^{2} (0.386 sq mi or 247 acres) and river estuaries.

Saint-Loup-des-Chaumes (French pronunciation: [sɛ̃ lu de ʃom]) is a commune in the Cher department in the Centre-Val de Loire region of France.

== Geography ==
An area of lakes, streams and farming comprising the village and two hamlets is situated on the banks of the river Cher, which is some 18 miles (29 km) south of Bourges at the junction of the D3 with the D35 and the D37 roads. The A71 autoroute passes through the eastern side of the commune.

== Population ==
Historical population
Year	Pop.	±% p.a.
1968	345	—
1975	322	−0.98%
1982	302	−0.91%
1990	278	−1.03%
1999	277	−0.04%
2007	285	+0.36%
2012	303	+1.23%
2017	299	−0.27%
2023	279	−1.15%
Source: INSEE

== Sights ==
- The church of St. Loup, dating from the twelfth century.
- The ruins of a fourteenth-century chateau.
- An eighteenth-century watermill.
- Traces of a Roman aqueduct.

== See also ==
- Communes of the Cher department
