= Montlouis =

- Commune
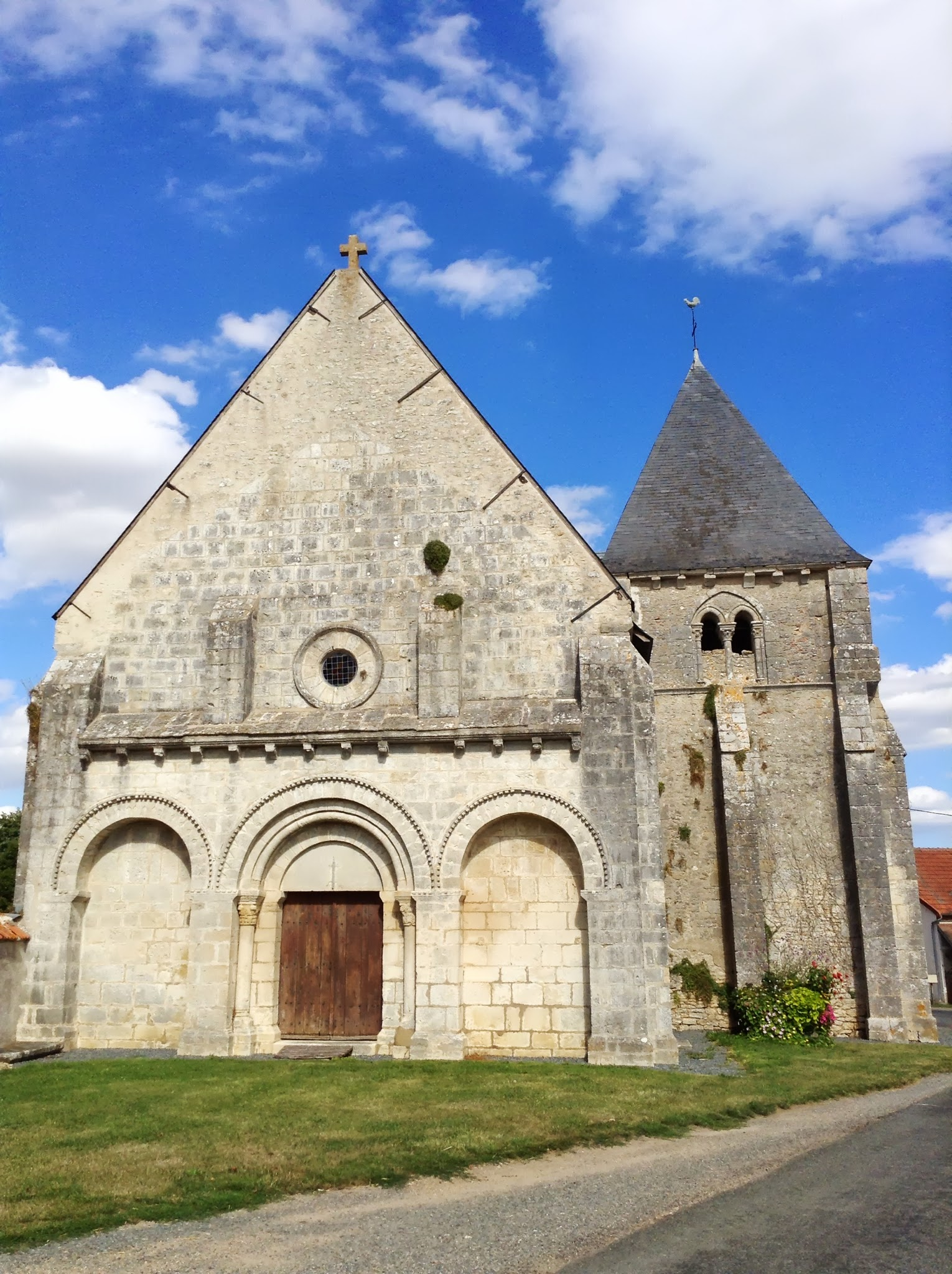
- The church of Saint-Martin, in Montlouis
- Location of Montlouis
- Location within France Location within Centre-Val de Loire
- Coordinates: 46°48′54″N 2°14′27″E
- Country: France
- Region: Centre-Val de Loire
- Department: Cher
- Arrondissement: Saint-Amand-Montrond
- Canton: Châteaumeillant
- Intercommunality: CC Arnon Boischaut Cher

Government
  - Mayor (2020–2026): Isabelle Hue
- Area^{1}: 18.98 km^{2} (7.33 sq mi)
- Elevation: 180 m (590 ft)
- Highest elevation: 181 m (594 ft)
- Lowest elevation: 152 m (499 ft)
- Population (2023): 111
  - Density: 5.85/km^{2} (15.1/sq mi)
- Time zone: UTC+01:00 (CET)
  - Summer (DST): UTC+02:00 (CEST)
- INSEE/Postal code: 18152 /18160
- ^{1} French Land Register data, which excludes lakes, ponds, glaciers > 1 km^{2} (0.386 sq mi or 247 acres) and river estuaries.

Montlouis (French pronunciation: [mɔ̃lwi]) is a commune in the Cher department in the Centre-Val de Loire region of France.

== Geography ==
A farming area comprising a small village and a couple of hamlets, situated some 23 miles (37 km) southwest of Bourges, at the junction of the D15 with the D940 road. The small river Auzon flows through the north of the commune.

== Population ==
Historical population
Year	Pop.	±% p.a.
1968	180	—
1975	132	−4.33%
1982	124	−0.89%
1990	111	−1.37%
1999	120	+0.87%
2007	117	−0.32%
2012	107	−1.77%
2017	109	+0.37%
2023	111	+0.30%
Source: INSEE

== Sights ==
- The church of St. Martin, dating from the twelfth century (Historic monument).
- The medieval Maison de Varennes.

== See also ==
- Communes of the Cher department
