= Serruelles =

- Commune
- Location of Serruelles
- Location within France Location within Centre-Val de Loire
- Coordinates: 46°53′00″N 2°22′19″E
- Country: France
- Region: Centre-Val de Loire
- Department: Cher
- Arrondissement: Saint-Amand-Montrond
- Canton: Trouy
- Intercommunality: CC Arnon Boischaut Cher

Government
  - Mayor (2020–2026): Monique Aubailly
- Area^{1}: 7.51 km^{2} (2.90 sq mi)
- Elevation: 180 m (590 ft)
- Highest elevation: 179 m (587 ft)
- Lowest elevation: 159 m (522 ft)
- Population (2023): 66
  - Density: 8.8/km^{2} (23/sq mi)
- Time zone: UTC+01:00 (CET)
  - Summer (DST): UTC+02:00 (CEST)
- INSEE/Postal code: 18250 /18190
- ^{1} French Land Register data, which excludes lakes, ponds, glaciers > 1 km^{2} (0.386 sq mi or 247 acres) and river estuaries.

Serruelles (French pronunciation: [sɛʁɥɛl]) is a commune in the Cher department in the Centre-Val de Loire region of France.

== Geography ==
A very small farming and forestry village situated about13 miles (21 km) south of Bourges, at the junction of the D940 with the D130 road.

== Population ==
Historical population
Year	Pop.	±% p.a.
1968	57	—
1975	45	−3.32%
1982	52	+2.09%
1990	61	+2.02%
1999	58	−0.56%
2007	55	−0.66%
2012	58	+1.07%
2017	74	+4.99%
2023	66	−1.89%
Source: INSEE

== Sights ==
- The church of St. Ursin, dating from the eleventh century.
- The seventeenth-century manorhouse of Lambussey.

== See also ==
- Communes of the Cher department
