= Saint-Symphorien, Cher =

Saint-Symphorien
- Commune
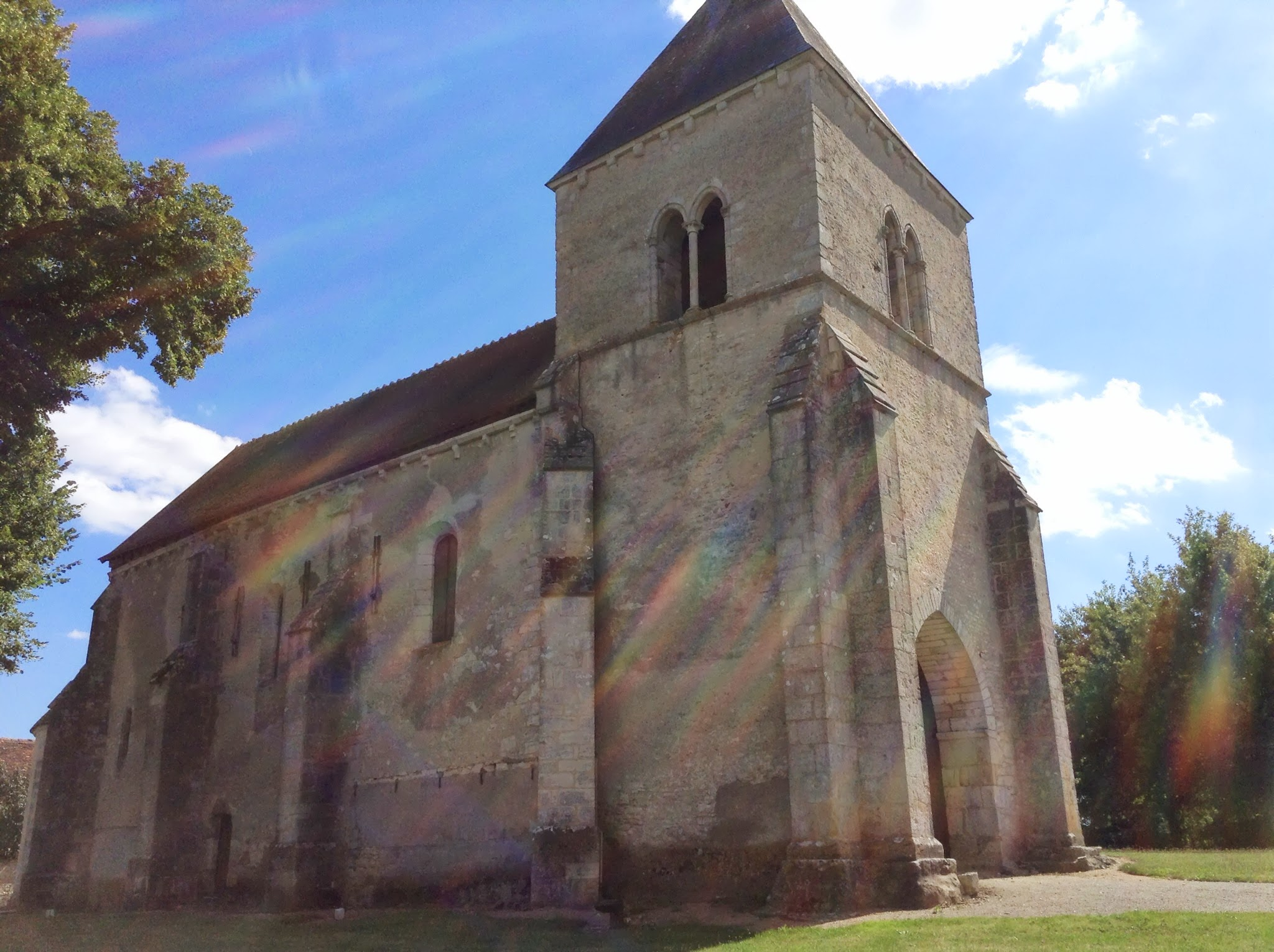
- The church in Saint-Symphorien
- Location of Saint-Symphorien
- Location within France Location within Centre-Val de Loire
- Coordinates: 46°48′46″N 2°18′41″E
- Country: France
- Region: Centre-Val de Loire
- Department: Cher
- Arrondissement: Saint-Amand-Montrond
- Canton: Trouy
- Intercommunality: CC Arnon Boischaut Cher

Government
  - Mayor (2020–2026): Micheline Jouneau
- Area^{1}: 9.54 km^{2} (3.68 sq mi)
- Elevation: 143 m (469 ft)
- Highest elevation: 178 m (584 ft)
- Lowest elevation: 141 m (463 ft)
- Population (2023): 133
  - Density: 13.9/km^{2} (36.1/sq mi)
- Time zone: UTC+01:00 (CET)
  - Summer (DST): UTC+02:00 (CEST)
- INSEE/Postal code: 18236 /18190
- ^{1} French Land Register data, which excludes lakes, ponds, glaciers > 1 km^{2} (0.386 sq mi or 247 acres) and river estuaries.

Saint-Symphorien (French pronunciation: [sɛ̃ sɛ̃fɔʁjɛ̃]) is a commune in the Cher department in the Centre-Val de Loire region of France.

== Geography ==
A small farming area comprising the village and two hamlets situated by the banks of the tiny river Trian, about 20 miles (32 km) south of Bourges at the junction of the D73 with the D144 road.

== Population ==
Historical population
Year	Pop.	±% p.a.
1968	129	—
1975	130	+0.11%
1982	111	−2.23%
1990	114	+0.33%
1999	105	−0.91%
2007	121	+1.79%
2012	129	+1.29%
2017	134	+0.76%
2023	133	−0.12%
Source: INSEE

== Sights ==
- The church of St. Symphorien, dating from the twelfth century (Historic monument).

== See also ==
- Communes of the Cher department
