= Lissay-Lochy =

- Commune
- Location of Lissay-Lochy
- Location within France Location within Centre-Val de Loire
- Coordinates: 46°58′22″N 2°24′27″E
- Country: France
- Region: Centre-Val de Loire
- Department: Cher
- Arrondissement: Bourges
- Canton: Trouy
- Intercommunality: CA Bourges Plus

Government
  - Mayor (2020–2026): Évelyne Seguin
- Area^{1}: 22.06 km^{2} (8.52 sq mi)
- Elevation: 172 m (564 ft)
- Highest elevation: 179 m (587 ft)
- Lowest elevation: 143 m (469 ft)
- Population (2023): 231
  - Density: 10.5/km^{2} (27.1/sq mi)
- Time zone: UTC+01:00 (CET)
  - Summer (DST): UTC+02:00 (CEST)
- INSEE/Postal code: 18129 /18340
- ^{1} French Land Register data, which excludes lakes, ponds, glaciers > 1 km^{2} (0.386 sq mi or 247 acres) and river estuaries.

Lissay-Lochy (French pronunciation: [lisɛ lɔʃi]) is a commune in the Cher department in the Centre-Val de Loire region of France.

== Geography ==
A farming area comprising a small village and several hamlets situated in the valley of the river Rampenne, some 8 miles (13 km) south of Bourges, at the junction of the D2144, D34 and the D217 roads. The A71 autoroute forms much of the eastern border of the commune.

== Population ==
Historical population
Year	Pop.	±% p.a.
1968	201	—
1975	160	−3.21%
1982	142	−1.69%
1990	130	−1.10%
1999	190	+4.31%
2007	202	+0.77%
2012	229	+2.54%
2017	224	−0.44%
2023	231	+0.51%
Source: INSEE

== Sights ==
- The church of St. Hilaire, dating from the thirteenth century.
- Traces of a Roman villa at Verrieres.

== See also ==
- Communes of the Cher department
