= Vorly =

- Commune
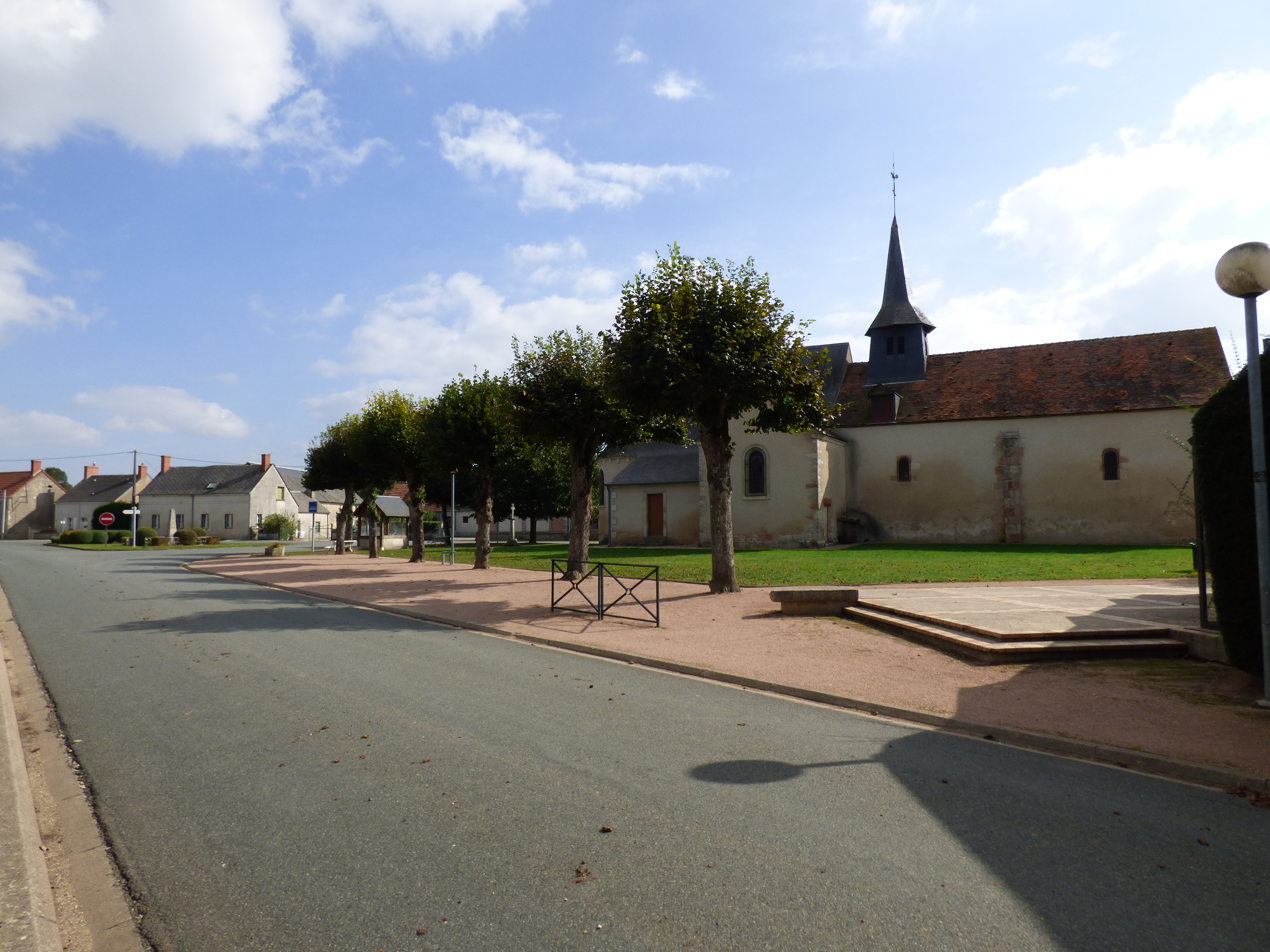
- The church in Vorly
- Location of Vorly
- Location within France Location within Centre-Val de Loire
- Coordinates: 46°56′46″N 2°27′57″E
- Country: France
- Region: Centre-Val de Loire
- Department: Cher
- Arrondissement: Bourges
- Canton: Trouy
- Intercommunality: Bourges Plus

Government
  - Mayor (2020–2026): Corinne Lefebvre
- Area^{1}: 18.84 km^{2} (7.27 sq mi)
- Elevation: 178 m (584 ft)
- Highest elevation: 184 m (604 ft)
- Lowest elevation: 154 m (505 ft)
- Population (2023): 247
  - Density: 13.1/km^{2} (34.0/sq mi)
- Time zone: UTC+01:00 (CET)
  - Summer (DST): UTC+02:00 (CEST)
- INSEE/Postal code: 18288 /18340
- ^{1} French Land Register data, which excludes lakes, ponds, glaciers > 1 km^{2} (0.386 sq mi or 247 acres) and river estuaries.

Vorly (French pronunciation: [vɔʁli]) is a commune in the Cher department in the Centre-Val de Loire region of France.

== Geography ==
An area of forestry and farming comprising the village and a couple of hamlets situated about 10 miles (16 km) south of Bourges, at the junction of the D34 with the D71 road.

== Population ==
Historical population
Year	Pop.	±% p.a.
1968	300	—
1975	286	−0.68%
1982	254	−1.68%
1990	263	+0.44%
1999	249	−0.61%
2007	242	−0.36%
2012	252	+0.81%
2017	232	−1.64%
2023	247	+1.05%
Source: INSEE

== Sights ==
- The church of St. Saturnin, dating from the fifteenth century.
- The fourteenth-century chateau of Bois-Sir-Amé.
- A feudal motte.

== See also ==
- Communes of the Cher department
