= Châteauneuf-sur-Cher =

- Commune
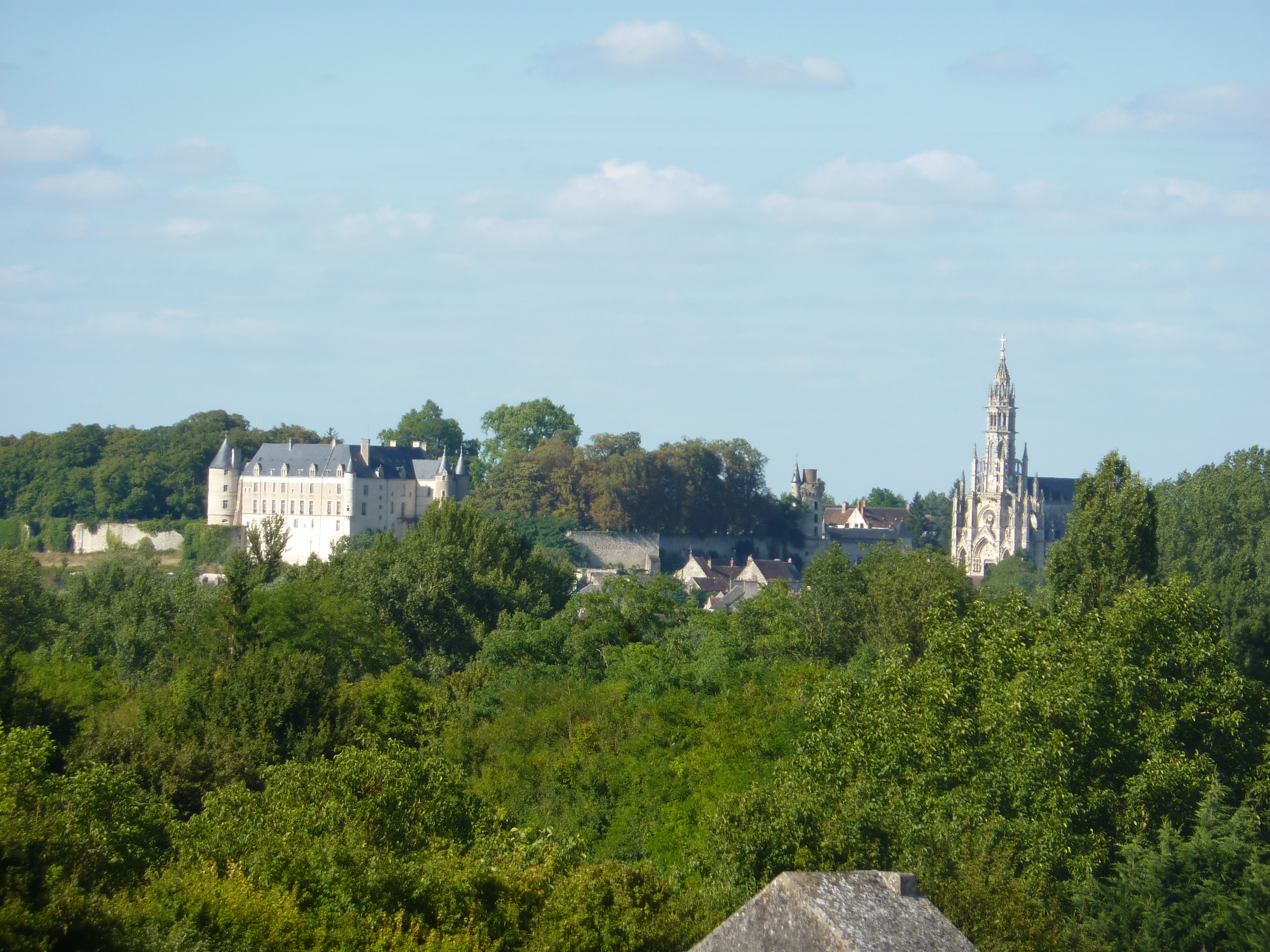
- A dry stone hut located at Châteauneuf-sur-Cher

- Coat of arms
- Location of Châteauneuf-sur-Cher
- Location within France Location within Centre-Val de Loire
- Coordinates: 46°51′30″N 2°19′02″E
- Country: France
- Region: Centre-Val de Loire
- Department: Cher
- Arrondissement: Saint-Amand-Montrond
- Canton: Trouy
- Intercommunality: CC Arnon Boischaut Cher

Government
  - Mayor (2024–2026): François Gambade
- Area^{1}: 21.97 km^{2} (8.48 sq mi)
- Elevation: 149 m (489 ft)
- Highest elevation: 174 m (571 ft)
- Lowest elevation: 132 m (433 ft)
- Population (2023): 1,360
  - Density: 61.9/km^{2} (160/sq mi)
- Time zone: UTC+01:00 (CET)
  - Summer (DST): UTC+02:00 (CEST)
- INSEE/Postal code: 18058 /18190
- ^{1} French Land Register data, which excludes lakes, ponds, glaciers > 1 km^{2} (0.386 sq mi or 247 acres) and river estuaries.

Châteauneuf-sur-Cher (French pronunciation: [ʃɑtonœf syʁ ʃɛʁ]) is a commune in the Cher department in the Centre-Val de Loire region of France.

== Geography ==
An area of farming and forestry comprising a large village and several hamlets situated in the valley of the river Cher, some 16 miles (26 km) south of Bourges at the junction of the D940 with the D73, D35 and the D14 roads.

== Population ==
Historical population
Year	Pop.	±% p.a.
1968	1,783	—
1975	1,722	−0.50%
1982	1,657	−0.55%
1990	1,645	−0.09%
1999	1,614	−0.21%
2007	1,533	−0.64%
2012	1,481	−0.69%
2017	1,454	−0.37%
2023	1,360	−1.11%
Source: INSEE

== Sights ==
- The nineteenth-century church of Notre-Dame.
- A thirteenth-century castle.
- The twelfth-century church at the hamlet of Marigny.
- The winegrowers’ stone cabin at Marigny.

== Personalities ==
- Ernest-Francois Mallard (1833–1894), mineralogist was born here.

== See also ==
- Communes of the Cher department
