= Chavannes, Cher =

Chavannes
- Commune
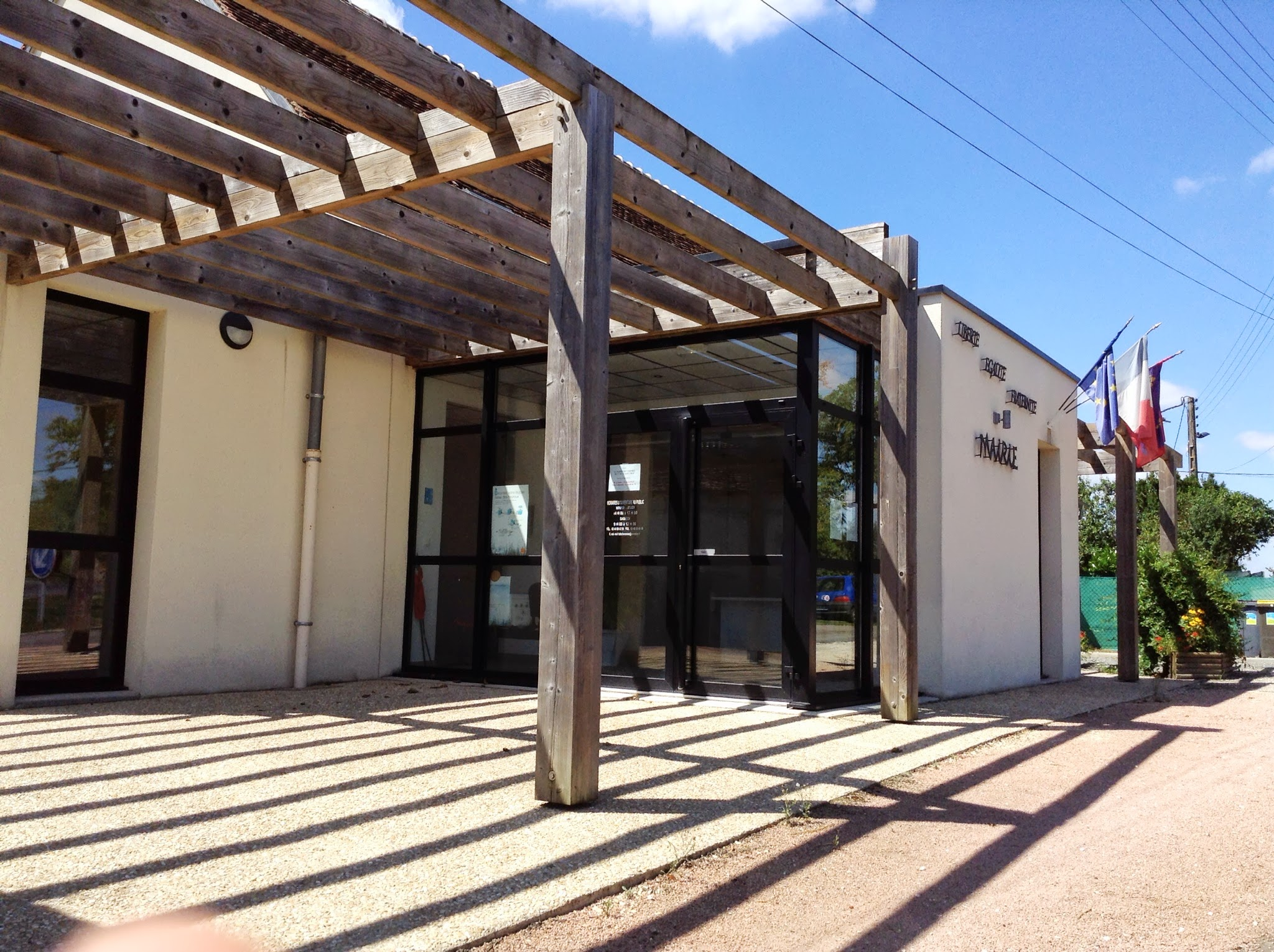
- The town hall in Chavannes

- Coat of arms
- Location of Chavannes
- Location within France Location within Centre-Val de Loire
- Coordinates: 46°51′14″N 2°22′35″E
- Country: France
- Region: Centre-Val de Loire
- Department: Cher
- Arrondissement: Saint-Amand-Montrond
- Canton: Trouy
- Intercommunality: CC Arnon Boischaut Cher

Government
  - Mayor (2020–2026): Guy Moreau
- Area^{1}: 24.06 km^{2} (9.29 sq mi)
- Elevation: 170 m (560 ft)
- Highest elevation: 179 m (587 ft)
- Lowest elevation: 155 m (509 ft)
- Population (2023): 151
  - Density: 6.28/km^{2} (16.3/sq mi)
- Time zone: UTC+01:00 (CET)
  - Summer (DST): UTC+02:00 (CEST)
- INSEE/Postal code: 18063 /18190
- ^{1} French Land Register data, which excludes lakes, ponds, glaciers > 1 km^{2} (0.386 sq mi or 247 acres) and river estuaries.

Chavannes (French pronunciation: [ʃavan]) is a commune in the Cher department in the Centre-Val de Loire region of France.

== Geography ==
A farming area comprising a small village and a couple of hamlets situated in the valley of the Cher, some 16 miles (26 km) south of Bourges at the junction of the D14 with the D3, D2144 and the D37 roads. The A71 autoroute passes through the eastern part of the commune's territory

== Population ==
Historical population
Year	Pop.	±% p.a.
1968	106	—
1975	97	−1.26%
1982	141	+5.49%
1990	160	+1.59%
1999	164	+0.27%
2007	152	−0.95%
2012	187	+4.23%
2017	173	−1.54%
2023	151	−2.24%
Source: INSEE

== Sights ==
- The church of St. Anne, dating from the twelfth century.
- A sixteenth-century manorhouse.
- Traces of a feudal castle.

== See also ==
- Communes of the Cher department
