= Vallenay =

- Commune
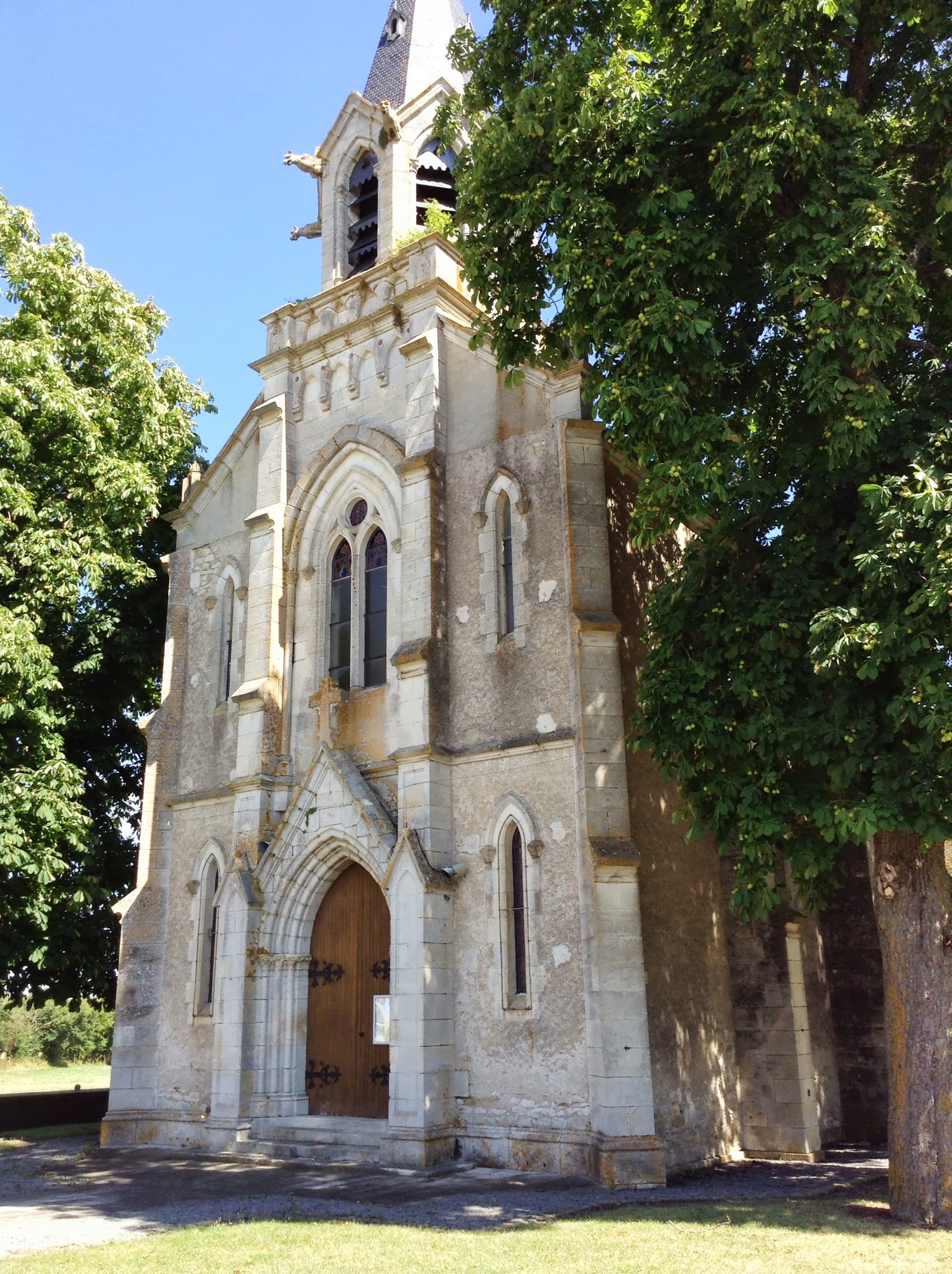
- The church of Saint-Roch

- Coat of arms
- Location of Vallenay
- Location within France Location within Centre-Val de Loire
- Coordinates: 46°48′08″N 2°22′19″E
- Country: France
- Region: Centre-Val de Loire
- Department: Cher
- Arrondissement: Saint-Amand-Montrond
- Canton: Trouy
- Intercommunality: CC Arnon Boischaut Cher

Government
  - Mayor (2020–2026): Marina Dupuy
- Area^{1}: 25.66 km^{2} (9.91 sq mi)
- Elevation: 180 m (590 ft)
- Highest elevation: 226 m (741 ft)
- Lowest elevation: 138 m (453 ft)
- Population (2023): 687
  - Density: 26.8/km^{2} (69.3/sq mi)
- Time zone: UTC+01:00 (CET)
  - Summer (DST): UTC+02:00 (CEST)
- INSEE/Postal code: 18270 /18190
- ^{1} French Land Register data, which excludes lakes, ponds, glaciers > 1 km^{2} (0.386 sq mi or 247 acres) and river estuaries.

Vallenay (French pronunciation: [valnɛ]) is a commune in the Cher department in the Centre-Val de Loire region of France.

== Geography ==
Vallenay is an area of forestry and farming. It comprises two villages and a couple of hamlets, situated in the valley of the river Cher, about 20 miles (32 km) south of Bourges, at the junction of the D3 and D38 road. The A71 autoroute runs through the commune’s eastern territory.

== Population ==
Historical population
Year	Pop.	±% p.a.
1968	1,009	—
1975	1,021	+0.17%
1982	833	−2.87%
1990	857	+0.36%
1999	709	−2.08%
2007	693	−0.28%
2012	704	+0.32%
2017	741	+1.03%
2023	687	−1.25%
Source: INSEE

== Sights ==
- The priory church of St. Martin, dating from the twelfth century
- The chateau of Bigny
- The chateau du Preuil
- A forge "La Petite Forge" at Bigny
- Old limekilns
- A seventeenth-century chapel at Bigny

== See also ==
- Communes of the Cher department
