= Lapan, Cher =

Lapan
- Commune
- Location of Lapan
- Location within France Location within Centre-Val de Loire
- Coordinates: 46°55′27″N 2°18′02″E
- Country: France
- Region: Centre-Val de Loire
- Department: Cher
- Arrondissement: Bourges
- Canton: Trouy
- Intercommunality: CC Arnon Boischaut Cher

Government
  - Mayor (2020–2026): Annie Raduget
- Area^{1}: 10.5 km^{2} (4.1 sq mi)
- Elevation: 160 m (520 ft)
- Highest elevation: 174 m (571 ft)
- Lowest elevation: 126 m (413 ft)
- Population (2023): 229
  - Density: 21.8/km^{2} (56.5/sq mi)
- Time zone: UTC+01:00 (CET)
  - Summer (DST): UTC+02:00 (CEST)
- INSEE/Postal code: 18122 /18340
- ^{1} French Land Register data, which excludes lakes, ponds, glaciers > 1 km^{2} (0.386 sq mi or 247 acres) and river estuaries.

Lapan (French pronunciation: [lapɑ̃]) is a commune in the Cher department in the Centre-Val de Loire region of France.

== Geography ==
A small farming village situated in the Cher river valley, some 12 miles (19 km) south of Bourges, at the junction of the D35 and the D177 roads.

== Population ==
Historical population
Year	Pop.	±% p.a.
1968	146	—
1975	129	−1.75%
1982	131	+0.22%
1990	137	+0.56%
1999	142	+0.40%
2007	149	+0.60%
2012	190	+4.98%
2017	207	+1.73%
2023	229	+1.70%
Source: INSEE

== Sights ==
- The eighteenth-century chateau of Houet.
- The watermill.
- The church of St. Caprais, dating from the twelfth century.

== See also ==
- Communes of the Cher department
