= Canton of Trouy =

Coordinates: 47.01°N 2.36°E

The canton of Trouy is an administrative division of the Cher department, in central France. It was created at the French canton reorganisation which came into effect in March 2015. Its seat is in Trouy.

It consists of the following communes:

1. Annoix
2. Arçay
3. Chambon
4. Châteauneuf-sur-Cher
5. Chavannes
6. Corquoy
7. Crézançay-sur-Cher
8. Lapan
9. Levet
10. Lissay-Lochy
11. Plaimpied-Givaudins
12. Saint-Caprais
13. Saint-Just
14. Saint-Loup-des-Chaumes
15. Saint-Symphorien
16. Senneçay
17. Serruelles
18. Soye-en-Septaine
19. Trouy
20. Uzay-le-Venon
21. Vallenay
22. Venesmes
23. Vorly
