= Uzay-le-Venon =

- Commune
- Location of Uzay-le-Venon
- Location within France Location within Centre-Val de Loire
- Coordinates: 46°48′46″N 2°27′45″E
- Country: France
- Region: Centre-Val de Loire
- Department: Cher
- Arrondissement: Saint-Amand-Montrond
- Canton: Trouy
- Intercommunality: CC Arnon Boischaut Cher

Government
  - Mayor (2020–2026): Gilles Delfolie
- Area^{1}: 34.6 km^{2} (13.4 sq mi)
- Elevation: 180 m (590 ft)
- Highest elevation: 183 m (600 ft)
- Lowest elevation: 148 m (486 ft)
- Population (2023): 414
  - Density: 12.0/km^{2} (31.0/sq mi)
- Time zone: UTC+01:00 (CET)
  - Summer (DST): UTC+02:00 (CEST)
- INSEE/Postal code: 18268 /18190
- ^{1} French Land Register data, which excludes lakes, ponds, glaciers > 1 km^{2} (0.386 sq mi or 247 acres) and river estuaries.

Uzay-le-Venon (French pronunciation: [yzɛ lə vənɔ̃]) is a commune in the Cher department in the Centre-Val de Loire region of France.

== Geography ==
An area of forestry and farming comprising the village and a couple of hamlets situated in the valley of the river Cher, about 16 miles (26 km) south of Bourges at the junction of the D37 with the D223 and on the D2144 road.

== Population ==
Historical population
Year	Pop.	±% p.a.
1968	416	—
1975	407	−0.31%
1982	357	−1.86%
1990	383	+0.88%
1999	395	+0.34%
2007	393	−0.06%
2012	410	+0.85%
2017	401	−0.44%
2023	414	+0.53%
Source: INSEE

== Sights ==
- The church of St. Victor, dating from the fourteenth century.
- Roman remains at Chalais.

== See also ==
- Communes of the Cher department
