= Lignières, Cher =

Lignières
- Commune
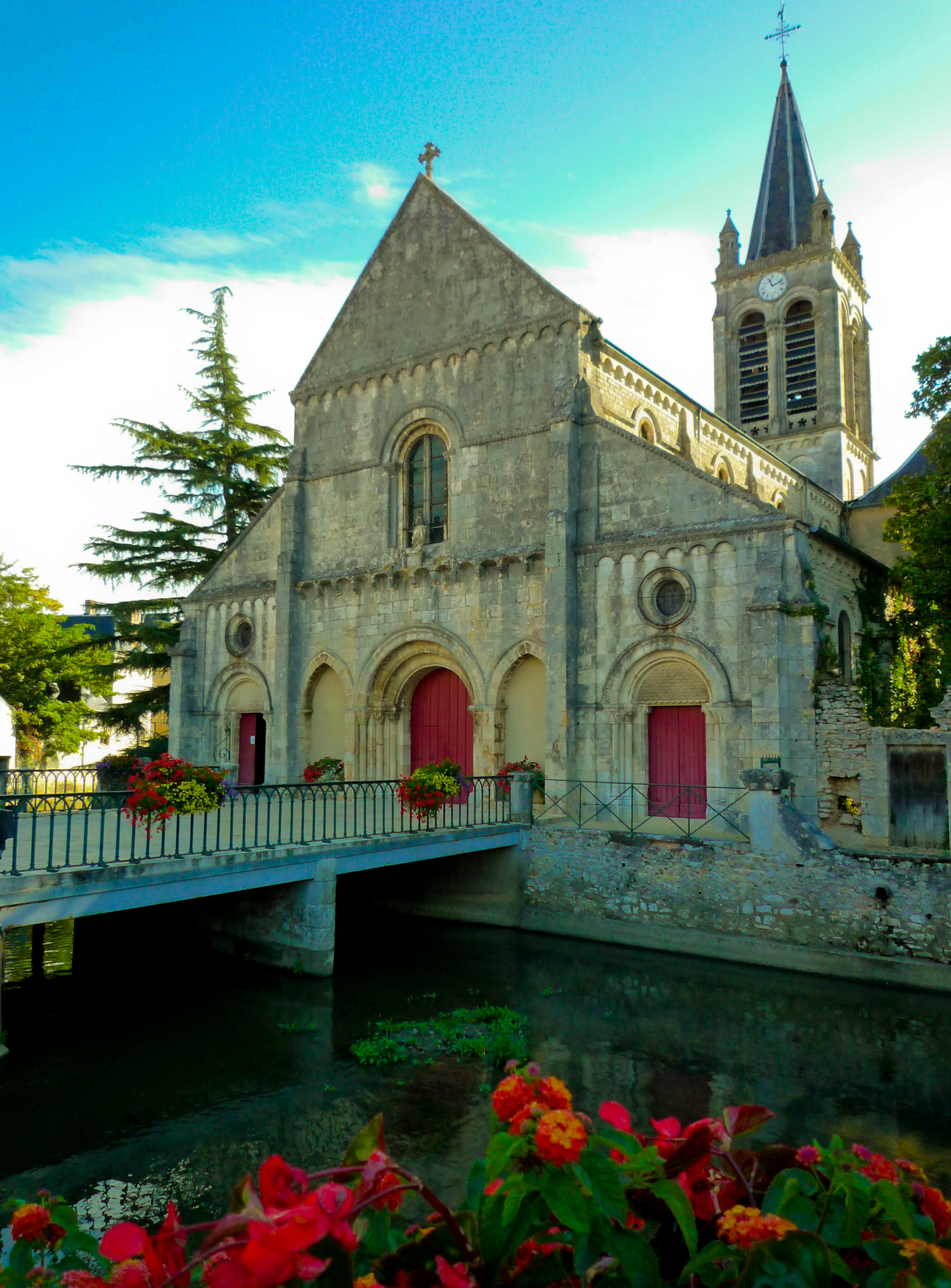
- Church of Notre-Dame

- Coat of arms
- Location of Lignières
- Location within France Location within Centre-Val de Loire
- Coordinates: 46°45′07″N 2°10′34″E
- Country: France
- Region: Centre-Val de Loire
- Department: Cher
- Arrondissement: Saint-Amand-Montrond
- Canton: Châteaumeillant
- Intercommunality: Arnon Boischaut Cher

Government
  - Mayor (2025–2026): Dominique Champagne
- Area^{1}: 21.88 km^{2} (8.45 sq mi)
- Elevation: 178 m (584 ft)
- Highest elevation: 202 m (663 ft)
- Lowest elevation: 153 m (502 ft)
- Population (2023): 1,310
  - Density: 59.9/km^{2} (155/sq mi)
- Demonym(s): Ligniérois, Ligniéroises
- Time zone: UTC+01:00 (CET)
  - Summer (DST): UTC+02:00 (CEST)
- INSEE/Postal code: 18127 /18160
- ^{1} French Land Register data, which excludes lakes, ponds, glaciers > 1 km^{2} (0.386 sq mi or 247 acres) and river estuaries.

Lignières (French pronunciation: [liɲjɛʁ]) is a commune in the Cher department in the Centre-Val de Loire region of France.

== Geography ==
An area of lakes, forestry and farming comprising a village and two hamlets situated by the banks of the river Arnon, some 24 miles (39 km) southwest of Bourges, at the junction of the D925, D940 and the D65 roads. The commune borders the department of Indre.

== Population ==
Historical population
Year	Pop.	±% p.a.
1968	1,831	—
1975	1,887	+0.43%
1982	1,829	−0.44%
1990	1,650	−1.28%
1999	1,588	−0.42%
2007	1,530	−0.46%
2012	1,423	−1.44%
2017	1,355	−0.97%
2023	1,310	−0.56%
Source: INSEE

== Sights ==
- The church of Notre-Dame, dating from the twelfth century
- The chateau du Plessis
- A manorhouse
- A watermill
- The sixteenth-century market hall
- Town hall
- The chateau, originally a feudal castle, rebuilt in the seventeenth century.
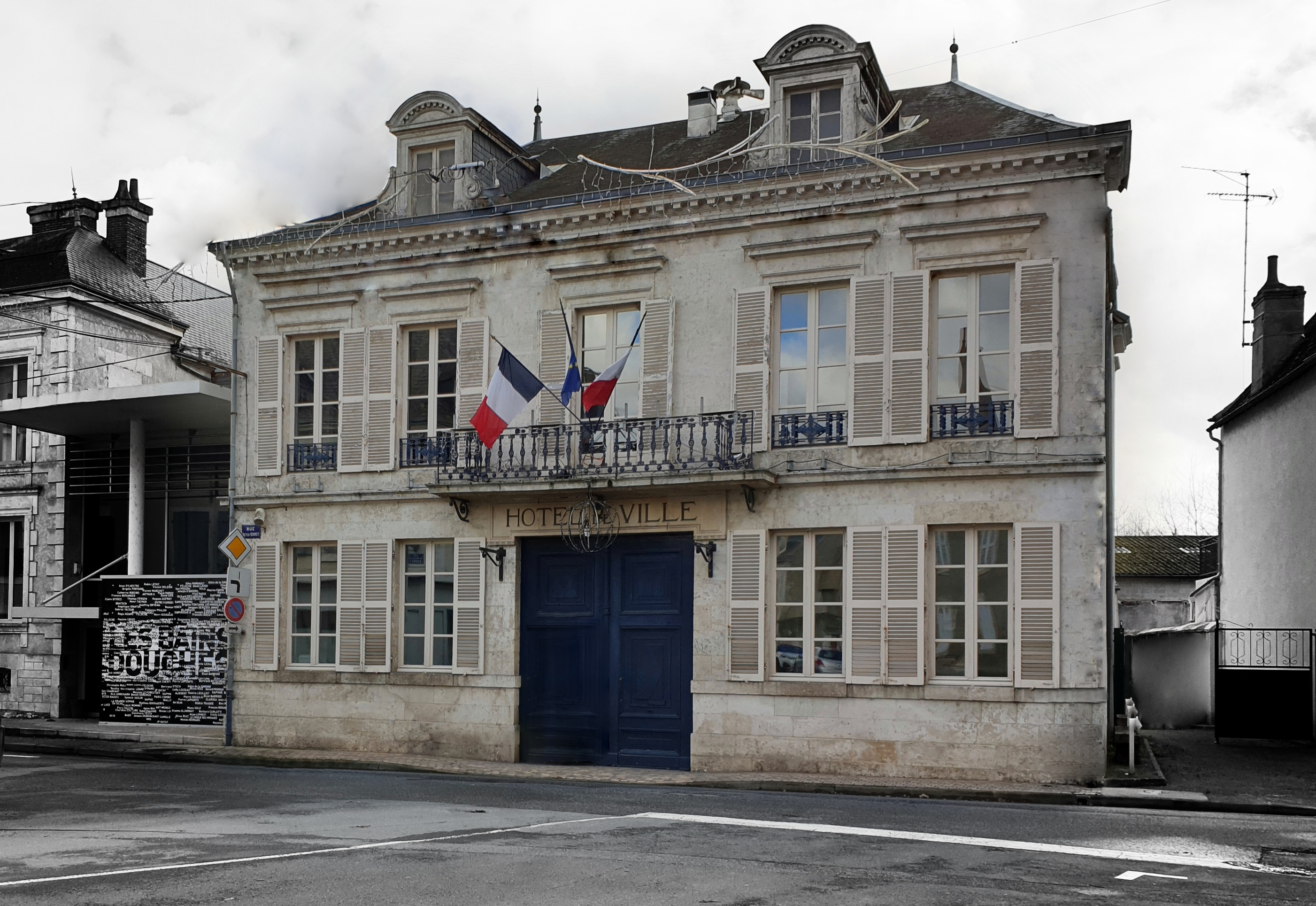
Town Hall

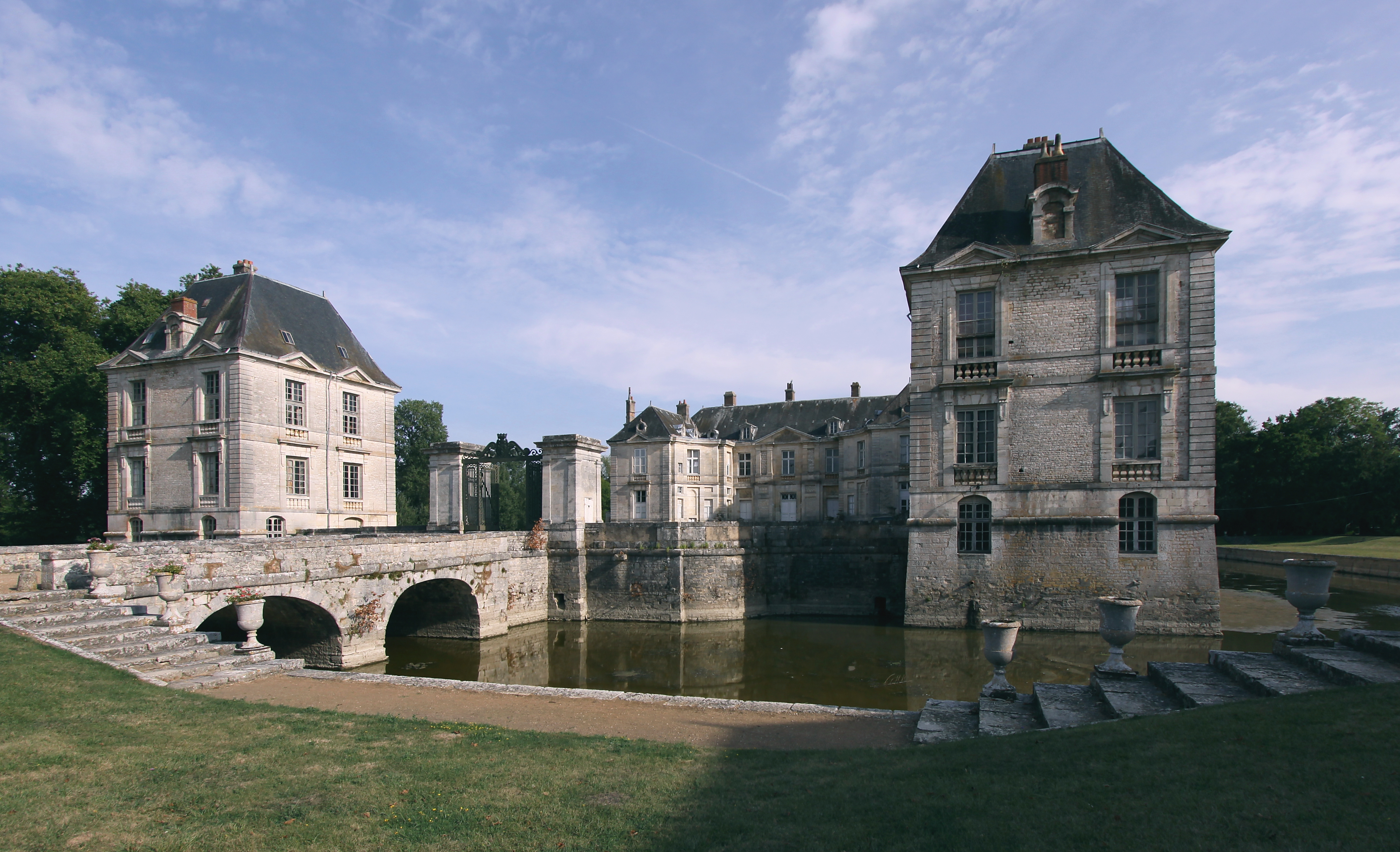
Château de Lignières

== Personalities ==
- Singer Florent Marchet was born here on 21 June 1975.
- Claimant to the Spanish throne, Prince Sixtus Henry of Bourbon-Parma, lives in the chateau.

== International relations ==
Lignières is twinned with: Dunbar, in Scotland, UK.

== See also ==
- Communes of the Cher department
