= Canton of Nérondes =

Coordinates: 46°59′54″N 2°49′13″E

Nérondes
- Former canton
- Interactive map of Nérondes
- Country: France
- Region: Centre-Val de Loire
- Department: Cher
- No. of communes: {{{nbcomm}}}
- Disbanded: 2015
- Area: 249.95 km^{2} (96.51 sq mi)
- Population (2012): 4,829
  - Density: 19.32/km^{2} (50.04/sq mi)

The Canton of Nérondes is a former canton situated in the Cher département and in the Centre region of France. It was disbanded following the French canton reorganisation which came into effect in March 2015. It consisted of 13 communes, which joined the canton of La Guerche-sur-l'Aubois in 2015. It had 4,829 inhabitants (2012).

== Geography ==
An area of forestry and farming in the northeastern part of the arrondissement of Saint-Amand-Montrond centred on the town of Nérondes. The altitude varies from 169m at Charly to 270m at Croisy, with an average altitude of 205m.

The canton comprised 13 communes:

- Blet
- Charly
- Cornusse
- Croisy
- Flavigny
- Ignol
- Lugny-Bourbonnais
- Menetou-Couture
- Mornay-Berry
- Nérondes
- Ourouer-les-Bourdelins
- Saint-Hilaire-de-Gondilly
- Tendron

== Population ==
Historical population Canton of Nérondes
Year	1962	1968	1975	1982	1990	1999
Pop.	4,955	5,491	4,975	4,809	4,753	4,748
±%	—	+10.8%	−9.4%	−3.3%	−1.2%	−0.1%
From the year 1962 on: No double counting – residents of multiple communes (e.g. students and military personnel) are counted only once. Source: INSEE

== See also ==
- Arrondissements of the Cher department
- Cantons of the Cher department
- Communes of the Cher department
