= List of windmills in Cher =

A list of windmills in Cher, France.

Location	Name of mill	Type	Built	Notes	Photograph
Allouis	Moulin à vent	Moulin Tour		Moulins-a-Vent (in French)	
Allouis	Moulin de Bablou	Moulin Tour		Moulin à eau(in French)	
Allouis	Moulin au Château Les Fontaines	Moulin Tour		Moulins-a-Vent (in French)	
Monte Conor, Bannay	Moulin du Bussy	Moulin Tour		Moulins-a-Vent (in French)	
Boulleret	Moulin de Boulleret	Moulin Tour		Moulins-a-Vent (in French)	
Chassy	Moulin de Villiers	Moulin Tour		Moulins-a-Vent (in French)	
Chezal-Benoît	Moulin de Nouan la Croizette	Moulin Tour	Early 18th century	Moulins-a-Vent (in French)	
Croisy	Moulin a Le Coudray	Moulin Tour		Moulins-a-Vent (in French)	
Cuffy	Moulin à vent	Moulin Tour		Moulins-a-Vent (in French)	
Dun-sur-Auron	Moulin de Ripière	Moulin Tour		Moulins-a-Vent (in French)	
Dun-sur-Auron	Moulin de Vorly	Moulin Tour		Moulins-a-Vent (in French)	
Dun-sur-Auron	Moulin de la Forge	Moulin Tour		Ruin; Moulins-a-Vent (in French)	
Foëcy	Moulin Les Varennes	Moulin Tour		Moulins-a-Vent (in French)	
Foëcy	Moulin de Chantegrue	Moulin Tour		Moulins-a-Vent (in French)	
Lantan	Moulin de Lantan	Moulin Tour		Moulins-a-Vent (in French)	
Nérondes	Moulin de Verrières	Moulin Tour		Moulins-a-Vent (in French)	
Ourouer-les-Bourdelins	Moulin de Ourouer-les-Bourdelins	Moulin Tour		Moulins-a-Vent (in French)	
Sancerre	Moulin des Bouffants	Moulin Tour		Moulins-a-Vent (in French)	
Saint-Denis-de-Palin	Moulin de Villaine	Moulin Tour		Moulins-a-Vent (in French)	
Saint-Just-Chambon	Moulin de la Sapinière	Moulin Tour		Moulins-a-Vent (in French)	
Vereaux	Moulin à L'Arpentin	Moulin Tour		Moulins-a-Vent (in French)	
Villabon	Moulin des Déserts	Moulin Tour		Moulins-a-Vent (in French)	
Villabon	Moulin de Chassy	Moulin Tour		Moulins-a-Vent (in French)	
