= Pierre de Mornay =

French bishop (died 1306)

Pierre de Mornay (Latin: Petrus de Mornevo; died 29 May 1306) was a French bishop of Orleans (1288–1296) and Auxerre (1296–1306) and chancellor of France (1304–1306).

== Life ==
Pierre de Mornay was the second son of Guillaume de Mornay, a knight whose estate was at Mornay near Nérondes in Berri (now Cher). His older brother Jean inherited the estate and became lord of Ferté-Nabert. Pierre studied law in Orléans. He may have served as the almoner of King Louis IX and served the Crown in some capacity under Philip III. He was a dean (French: doyen) of Saint-Germain l'Auxerrois in Paris by 1278 and made archdeacon of Sologne and a canon of Orléans Cathedral in 1281. By 1286, he was a royal clerk (clerc) under Philip IV and he was elected bishop of Orléans on 23 December 1288. Two contested elections regarding the diocese of Auxerre were annulled by Pope Boniface VIII in 1294. He instead appointed the bishop of Orléans to hold the role in a bull dated 4 February 1296.

Philip IV was committed to strengthening the position of the king of France. Pierre had helped him negotiate the 1295 Treaty of Anagni, ending Franco-Aragonese fighting during the War of the Sicilian Vespers and bringing himself to papal attention. By 1295, the king's other efforts had begun a war with England over Aquitaine and caused unrest in Flanders. Philip IV responded in part by levying a 10% tax (decime) on church income without first securing the necessary approvals from the Papacy, as he had in 1288. Pierre de Mornay was obliged by the church to defend its position against the king, codified in the 1296 bull Clericis laicos. Philip IV responded with an embargo against any export of gold or silver from France, effectively cutting Rome off from its French revenue while the Colonna family revolted against Boniface. Boniface yielded over a series of bulls, threatening excommunication while effectively pledging to approve reasonable taxation in Ineffabilis amor, allowing "voluntary" "donations" from a country's clergy without papal approval during times of emergency in Romana mater ecclesia, and finally capitulating entirely to Philip's position in the 1297 Etsi de statu and canonization of Louis IX.

Pierre de Mornay was involved with negotiations with the English at Gisors in November 1297 with Guillaume de Mâcon, bishop of Amiens, John II, duke of Brittany, Guy de Chatillon, count of St-Pol and constable of France, and Raoul de Clermont, lord of Nesles; at Montreuil in 1299 with Gilles, archbishop of Narbonne, Robert II, duke of Burgundy, Pierre Flotte, Pierre de Belleperche, and Guy de Chatillon; and at Paris in 1302 and 1303 with the dukes of Brittany and Burgundy and with Philip's chamberlain Pierre the Fat. De Mornay was also involved in the negotiations to end the Franco-Flemish War and named Philip's chancellor in 1304.

He died at Régennes in Appoigny on 29 May 1306.

== Arms ==
His coat of arms was listed as a black lion morné with gold crown over 8 bands of silver and gold (Fascé de huit pièces d'argent et de geueles, au lion morné de sable, couronné d'or, brochant sur le tout).
