= Lugny =

Lugny may refer to the following places in France:

- Lugny, Saône-et-Loire, a commune in the department of Saône-et-Loire
- Lugny, Aisne, a commune in the department of Aisne
- Lugny-Bourbonnais, a commune in the department of Cher
- Lugny-Champagne, a commune in the department of Cher
- Lugny-lès-Charolles, a commune in the department of Saône-et-Loire
- Vault-de-Lugny, a commune in the department of Yonne
