= Cours-les-Barres =

- Commune
- Location of Cours-les-Barres
- Location within France Location within Centre-Val de Loire
- Coordinates: 47°01′32″N 3°01′56″E
- Country: France
- Region: Centre-Val de Loire
- Department: Cher
- Arrondissement: Saint-Amand-Montrond
- Canton: La Guerche-sur-l'Aubois

Government
  - Mayor (2020–2026): Pierre Mancion
- Area^{1}: 21.16 km^{2} (8.17 sq mi)
- Elevation: 175 m (574 ft)
- Highest elevation: 209 m (686 ft)
- Lowest elevation: 162 m (531 ft)
- Population (2023): 1,021
  - Density: 48.25/km^{2} (125.0/sq mi)
- Time zone: UTC+01:00 (CET)
  - Summer (DST): UTC+02:00 (CEST)
- INSEE/Postal code: 18075 /18320
- ^{1} French Land Register data, which excludes lakes, ponds, glaciers > 1 km^{2} (0.386 sq mi or 247 acres) and river estuaries.

Cours-les-Barres (French pronunciation: [kuʁ le baʁ]) is a commune in the Cher department in the Centre-Val de Loire region of France.

== Geography ==
The commune is in an area of farming and forestry comprising a village and several hamlets situated by the banks of both the Loire and the Loire lateral canal.

The village is 10 kilometres (6 mi) north-west of the centre of Nevers and 50 kilometres (31 mi) east of Bourges, at the junction of the D920 with the D40, D12 and D45 roads.

== Population ==
Historical population
Year	Pop.	±% p.a.
1968	698	—
1975	656	−0.88%
1982	906	+4.72%
1990	1,052	+1.89%
1999	1,082	+0.31%
2007	1,106	+0.27%
2012	1,078	−0.51%
2017	1,034	−0.83%
2023	1,021	−0.21%
Source: INSEE

== Sights ==
- The fifteenth-century church of St. Pantaléon.
- The manorhouse at Givry.
- A feudal motte.

== See also ==
- Communes of the Cher department
