= Airain =

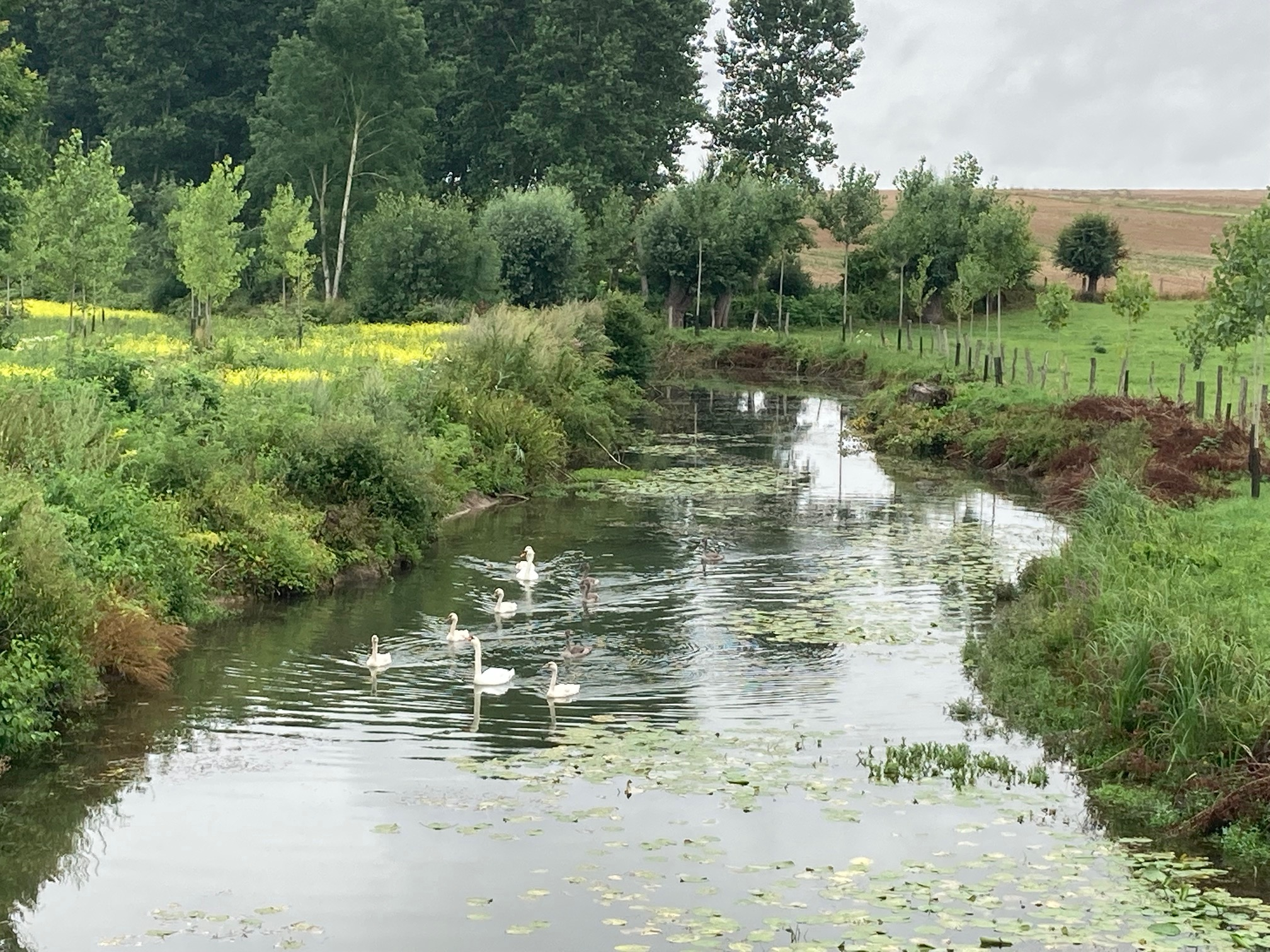

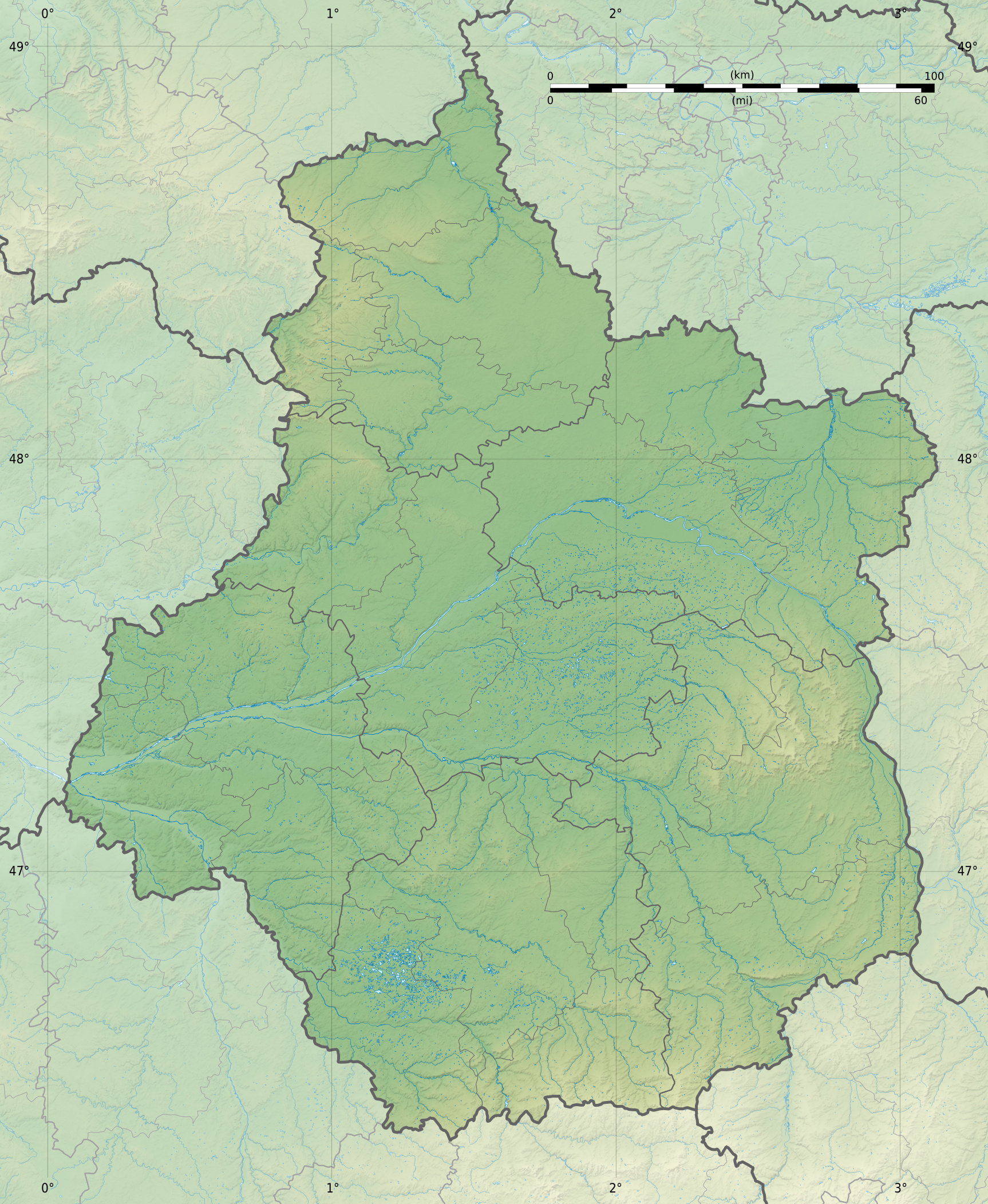
- Location within France Location within Centre-Val de Loire

Location
- Country: France

Physical characteristics
- Source
  - location: Nérondes
  - coordinates: 46°59′53″N 02°48′59″E
  - elevation: 185 m (607 ft)
- Mouth
  - location: Yèvre
  - coordinates: 47°02′59″N 02°33′55″E
  - elevation: 139 m (456 ft)
- Length: 47.8 km (29.7 mi)
- Basin size: 300 km^{2} (120 sq mi)
- Discharge
  - average: 1.62 m^{3}/s (57 cu ft/s)

Basin features
- Progression: Yèvre→ Cher→ Loire→ Atlantic Ocean

The Airain or Airin (French pronunciation: [ɛʁɛ̃]) is a 47.8 km (29.7 mi) long river in the Cher department in central France. Its source is at Nérondes. It flows generally west, with a U shape. It is a left tributary of the Yèvre, into which it flows at Savigny-en-Septaine, 13 km (8.1 mi) southeast of Bourges.

== Communes along its course ==
This list is ordered from source to mouth: Nérondes, Tendron, Bengy-sur-Craon, Flavigny, Cornusse, Ourouer-les-Bourdelins, Charly, Lugny-Bourbonnais, Osmery, Bussy, Vornay, Dun-sur-Auron, Crosses, Savigny-en-Septaine,
