= La Ferté-Saint-Aubin =

- Commune
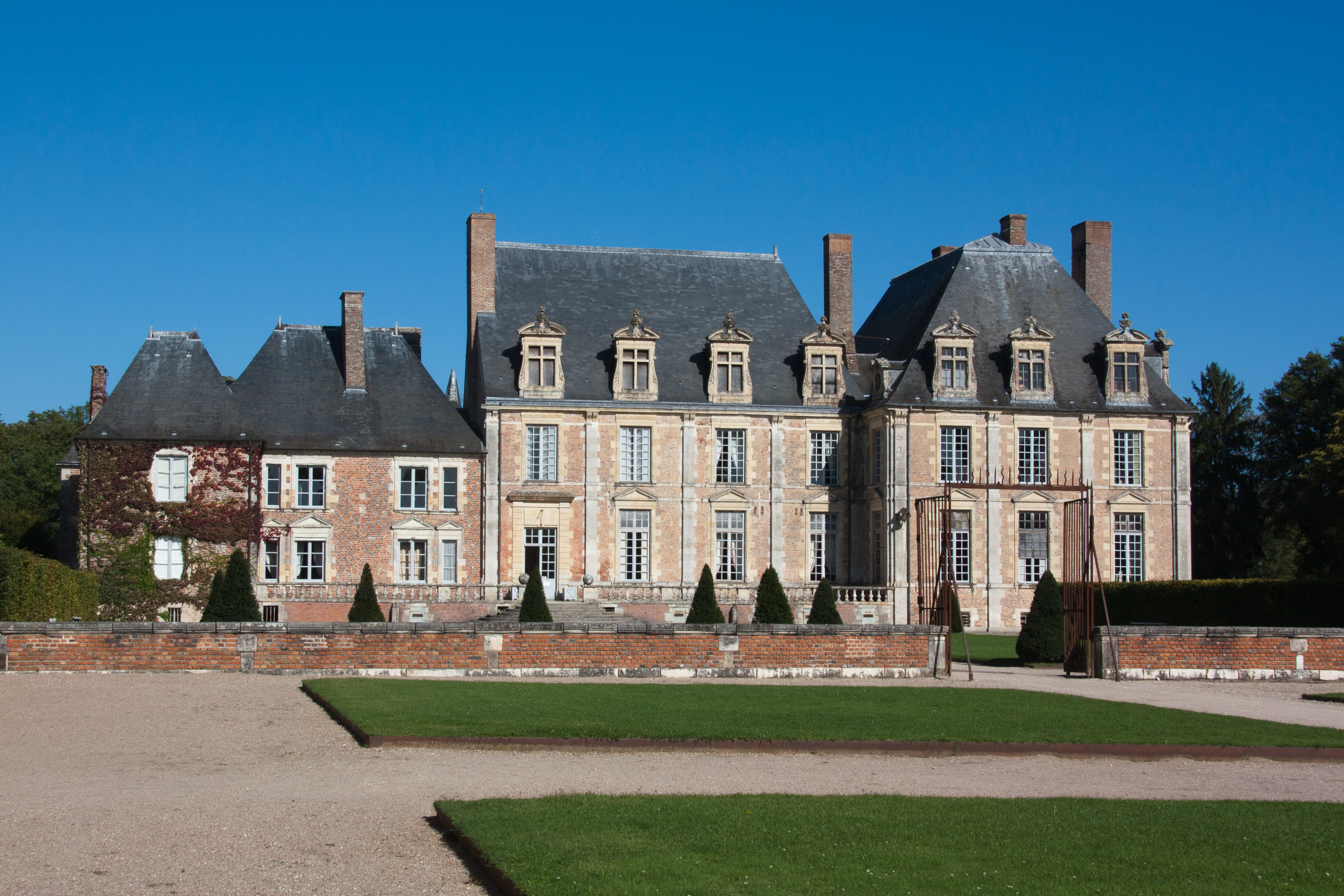
- The chateau in La-Ferté-Saint-Aubin

- Coat of arms
- Location of La Ferté-Saint-Aubin
- Location within France Location within Centre-Val de Loire
- Coordinates: 47°43′05″N 1°56′32″E
- Country: France
- Region: Centre-Val de Loire
- Department: Loiret
- Arrondissement: Orléans
- Canton: La Ferté-Saint-Aubin

Government
  - Mayor (2024–2026): Katia Bailly
- Area^{1}: 86.12 km^{2} (33.25 sq mi)
- Highest elevation: 137 m (449 ft)
- Lowest elevation: 93 m (305 ft)
- Population (2023): 7,284
  - Density: 84.58/km^{2} (219.1/sq mi)
- Time zone: UTC+01:00 (CET)
  - Summer (DST): UTC+02:00 (CEST)
- INSEE/Postal code: 45146 /45240
- ^{1} French Land Register data, which excludes lakes, ponds, glaciers > 1 km^{2} (0.386 sq mi or 247 acres) and river estuaries.

La Ferté-Saint-Aubin (French pronunciation: [la fɛʁte sɛ̃.t‿obɛ̃]) is a commune in the Loiret department in the administrative region of Centre-Val de Loire, France.

== Geography ==
The commune is traversed by the Cosson river.

== History ==
During the Middle Ages, the area was known as La Ferté-Nabert and held as a lordship (seigneur de la Ferté-Nabert) beginning with Jean de Mornay, brother of the bishop and chancellor Pierre de Mornay.

It was acquired in the 16th century by the house of Saint Nectaire (corrupted to Senneterre), and erected into a duchy in the peerage of France (duché-pairie) in 1665 for Henri de La Ferté-Senneterre, marshal of France. It was called La Ferté Lowendal after it had been acquired by Woldemar de Lowendal in 1748.

In February 1939, the Chateau de la Ferté-Saint-Aubin was used for exterior shots in the celebrated Jean Renoir movie The Rules of the Game (La Règle du Jeu).

== Population ==
Historical population
Year	Pop.	±% p.a.
1968	4,307	—
1975	4,284	−0.08%
1982	5,498	+3.63%
1990	6,414	+1.94%
1999	6,783	+0.62%
2007	7,010	+0.41%
2012	7,199	+0.53%
2017	7,454	+0.70%
2023	7,284	−0.38%
Source: INSEE

== See also ==
- Communes of the Loiret department
- Sologne
