= Buranlure Castle =

Ancient fortress in the Berry region of France

Coordinates: 47.41083°N 2.88711°E

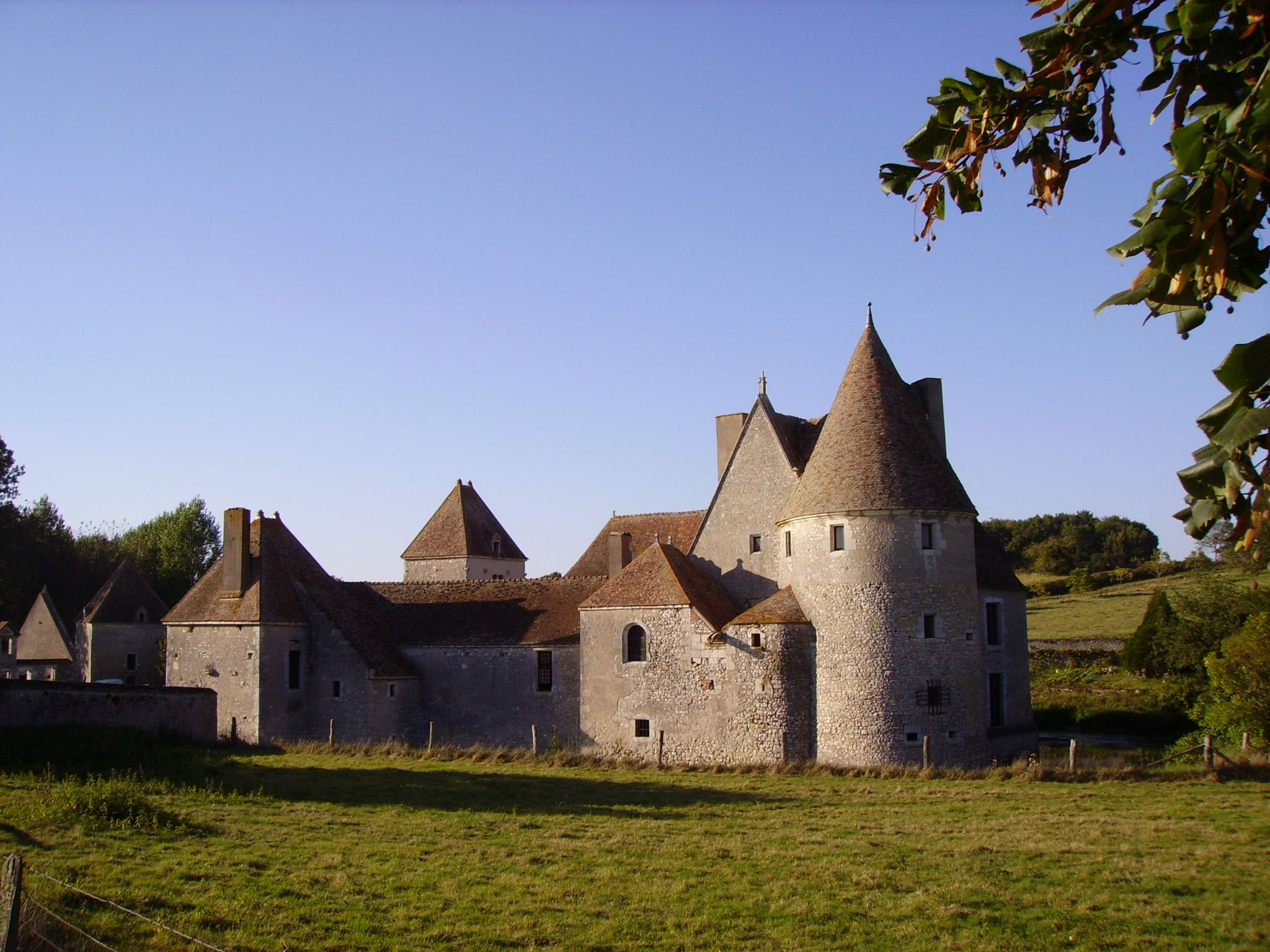

Buranlure Castle, or the Château de Buranlure, is an ancient fortress in the Berry region of France, dating from the late Middle Ages and the transition towards the Renaissance. Buranlure is located in the commune of Boulleret, in the Cher department, in the Centre-Val de Loire region.

== History ==
The domain of Buranlure, owned by the de Bar family, vassals to the Count of Sancerre, played a key defensive role in the vicinity between the 14th and 16th centuries.

Built adjacent to the Loire river, it was at the border between two kingdoms: that of the king of France, residing a few kilometres away in Bourges, and the Burgundians, in Cosne sur Loire. It was frequently used as a command post for the king's troops during the Hundred Years' War to counter the Anglo-Burgundians.

During the religious wars, the then lord of Buranlure, Antoine de Bar, raised an army to support the Maréchal de La Châtre as he was laying siege to Sancerre, a Protestant stronghold.

As the de Bar family gradually abandoned it for more comfortable houses, it was acquired in 1769 by the Perrinet Langeron family. Their interest in the purchase was more the pastures included in the estate than the castle, as they deemed it dull and sober. They converted the castle into a farmer's lodgings, and so it remained until the beginning of the 20th century.

This lack of interest left Buranlure architecturally untouched, allowing it to keep its rustic look and feel throughout the centuries while other castles were given more modern touches. However, heavily worn out by time and the occupation, an ambitious restoration project was launched at the end of World War II by Arnaud de Vogüé, a descendant of the Perrinet Langeron family. Thanks to the work of experts and local craftsmen, great care was given to ensure Buranlure kept its authenticity.

It was classified as a monument historique in 1944 and has remained in the same family ever since.

== Events ==
The castle is open to the public every year in July and August and during the European heritage days.

Buranlure has been used as a setting for several films or TV films:

- Le Grand Inquisiteur by Raoul Sangla for Antenne 2 (1979)
- Parking by Jacques Demy, with Francis Huster (1985)
- Dandin by Roger Planchon, with Claude Brasseur and Zabou Breitman (1987)
- Les Trois Mousquetaires (TV film) (2005)
- Henri IV (2008) by Jo Baier
- La Commanderie (2008) série TV.
