= La Guerche-sur-l'Aubois =

- Commune
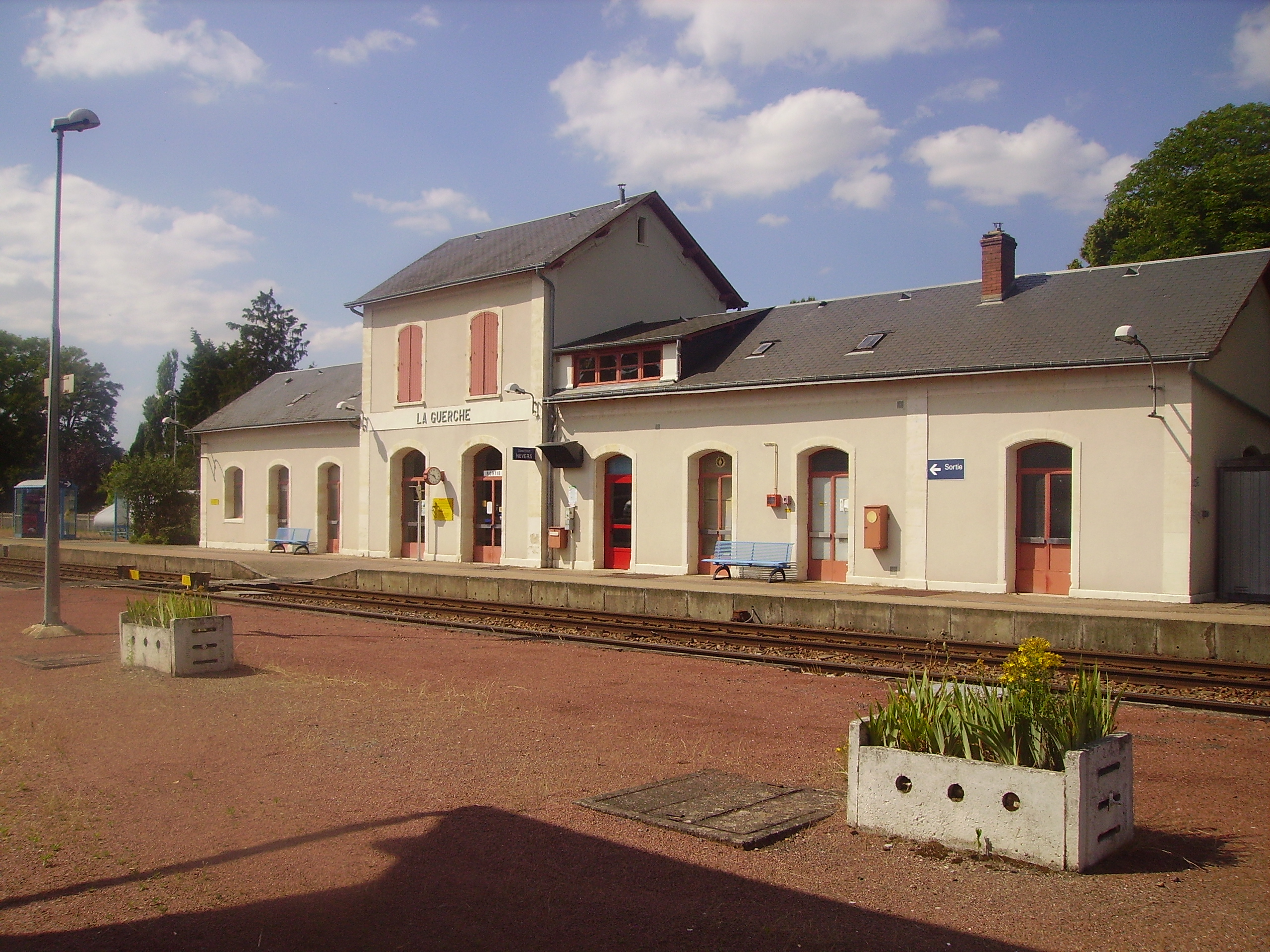
- Railway station

- Coat of arms
- Location of La Guerche-sur-l'Aubois
- Location within France Location within Centre-Val de Loire
- Coordinates: 46°57′07″N 2°56′54″E
- Country: France
- Region: Centre-Val de Loire
- Department: Cher
- Arrondissement: Saint-Amand-Montrond
- Canton: La Guerche-sur-l'Aubois

Government
  - Mayor (2020–2026): Pierre Ducastel
- Area^{1}: 52.7 km^{2} (20.3 sq mi)
- Elevation: 181 m (594 ft)
- Highest elevation: 222 m (728 ft)
- Lowest elevation: 175 m (574 ft)
- Population (2023): 3,151
  - Density: 59.8/km^{2} (155/sq mi)
- Time zone: UTC+01:00 (CET)
  - Summer (DST): UTC+02:00 (CEST)
- INSEE/Postal code: 18108 /18150
- ^{1} French Land Register data, which excludes lakes, ponds, glaciers > 1 km^{2} (0.386 sq mi or 247 acres) and river estuaries.

La Guerche-sur-l'Aubois (French pronunciation: [la ɡɛʁʃ syʁ lobwa], lit. 'La Guerche on the Aubois') is a commune in the Cher department in the Centre-Val de Loire region of France.

== Geography ==
An area of farming and forestry comprising a small town and several hamlets situated by the banks of the river Aubois and the canal de Berry, some 25 miles (40 km) southeast of Bourges, at the junction of the D920 and the D975 roads.

== Population ==
Historical population
Year	Pop.	±% p.a.
1968	3,717	—
1975	3,682	−0.14%
1982	3,326	−1.44%
1990	3,219	−0.41%
1999	3,397	+0.60%
2007	3,410	+0.05%
2012	3,325	−0.50%
2017	3,274	−0.31%
2023	3,151	−0.64%
Source: INSEE

== Sights ==
- Vestiges of Gallo-Roman occupation.
- Two watermills, at Faguin and l'Oie.
- The church of St. Etienne, dating from the twelfth century.
- An old ironworks.
- The fifteenth-century manorhouse at Chezelles.

== See also ==
- Communes of the Cher department
- Decauville railway of La Guerche-sur-l'Aubois
