= Decauville railway of La Guerche-sur-l'Aubois =

Coordinates: 46.950116120404005°N 2.9493037715342965°E

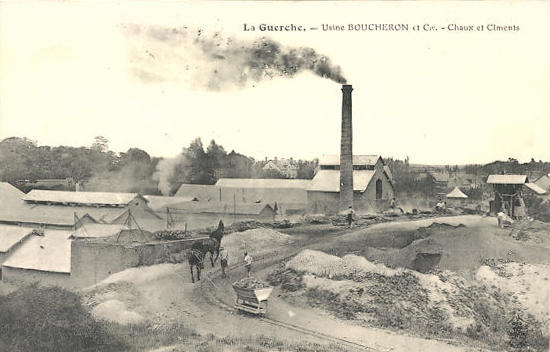
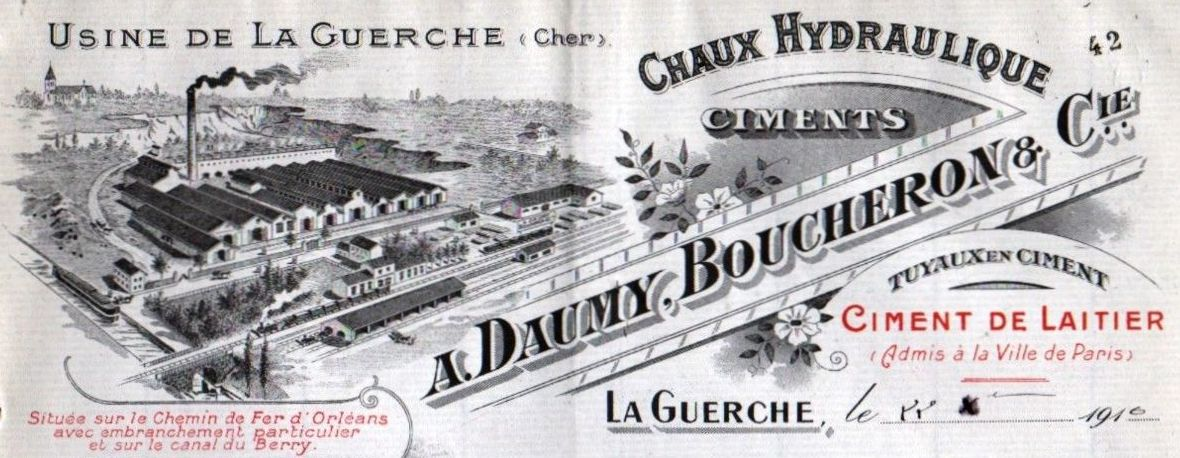
- Transport of the lime from the quarry to the kilns Artist impression of the route

Overview
- Native name: Réseau des carrières et fours à chaux Daumy, Boucheron & Cie

Technical
- Track gauge: 600 mm (1 ft 11 5/8 in)

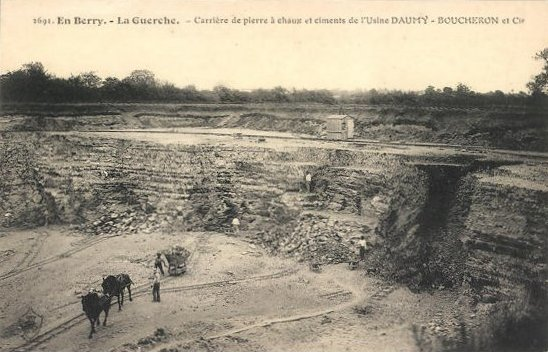
Decauville railway in the quarry

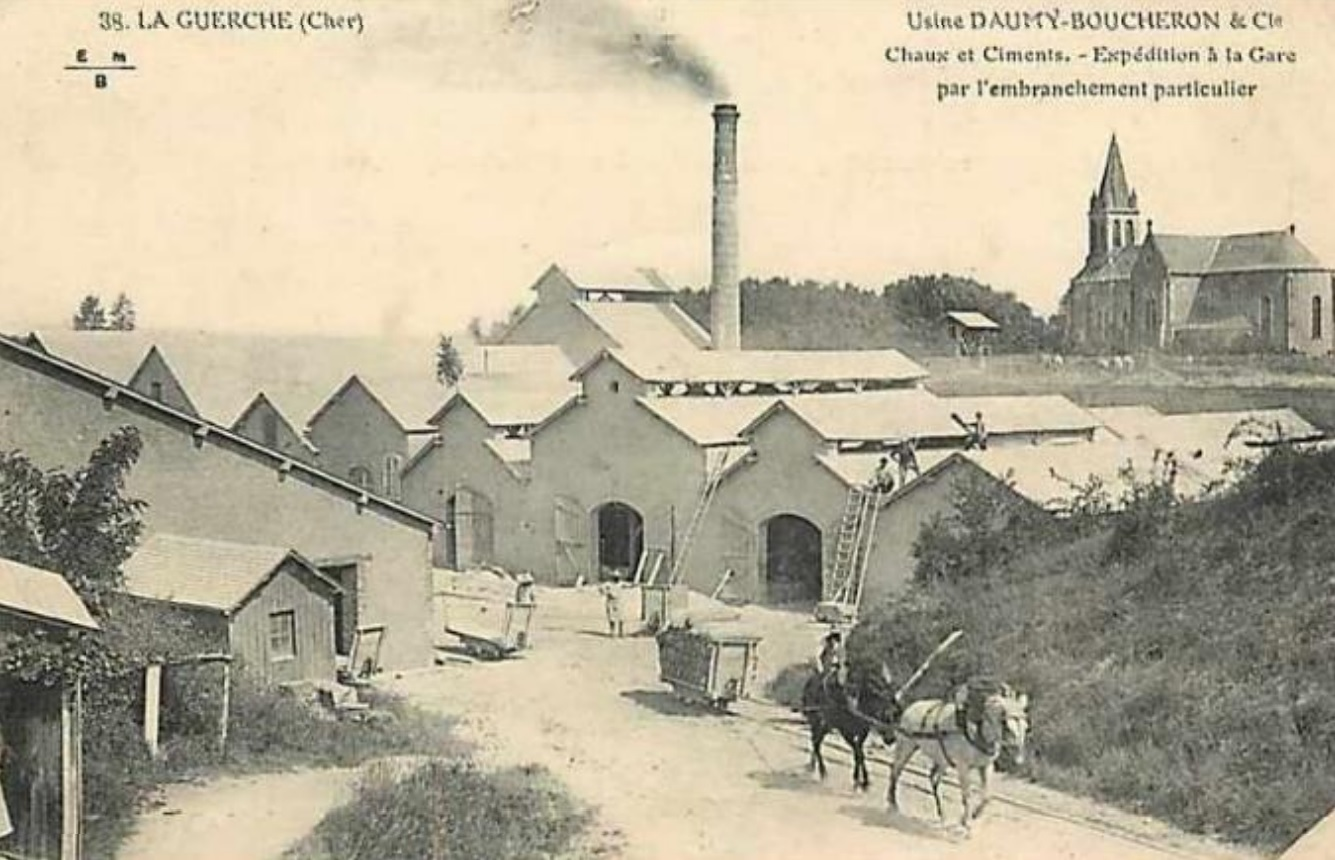
Transport of the produce to the railway station

The Decauville railway of La Guerche-sur-l'Aubois was a horse-drawn narrow-gauge railway, which operated around 1910 at the Daumy, Boucheron & Cie lime and cement factory in La Guerche-sur-l'Aubois.

== History ==
One of the founders of the company has originally been producing hydraulic lime, a building material that hardens both in the air and under water. His factory, Daumy Ainé et Cie, was initially, around 1869, located in Beffes near Jouet, 19 kilometres (12 mi) to the north.

== Route ==
Old postcards and the stationery used by Daumy, Boucheron & Cie around 1910 show all the means of transport they used. The lime was taken by the 600 mm (1 ft 11 5/8 in) gauge Decauville railway from the quarries below the church, to the limekilns, slaking ponds and grinding mills, and finally to the shipping points for the finished products on the railway and the Berry Canal. However, contrary to what is shown in the artistic impression, the factory was located about 500 metres (550 yd) away from the Berry Canal on the other side of the town centre of La Guerche.
