= Communauté de communes Pays de Nérondes =

Federation of municipalities in France

Pays de Nérondes
- Communauté de communes
- Country: France
- Region: Centre-Val de Loire
- Department: Cher
- No. of communes: {{{nbcomm}}}
- Established: 2007

Government
  - President: Thierry Porikian
- Area: 250.27 km^{2} (96.63 sq mi)
- Population (2018): 4,879
  - Density: 19.49/km^{2} (50.49/sq mi)

The communauté de communes Pays de Nérondes is located in the Cher département of the Centre-Val de Loire region of France. It was created on 1 January 2007 and its seat is Nérondes. Its area is 250.3 km^{2}, and its population was 4,879 in 2018.

== Composition ==
The communauté de communes consists of the following 12 communes:

1. Bengy-sur-Craon
2. Blet
3. Charly
4. Chassy
5. Cornusse
6. Croisy
7. Flavigny
8. Ignol
9. Mornay-Berry
10. Nérondes
11. Ourouer-les-Bourdelins
12. Tendron
