= Bengy-sur-Craon =

- Commune
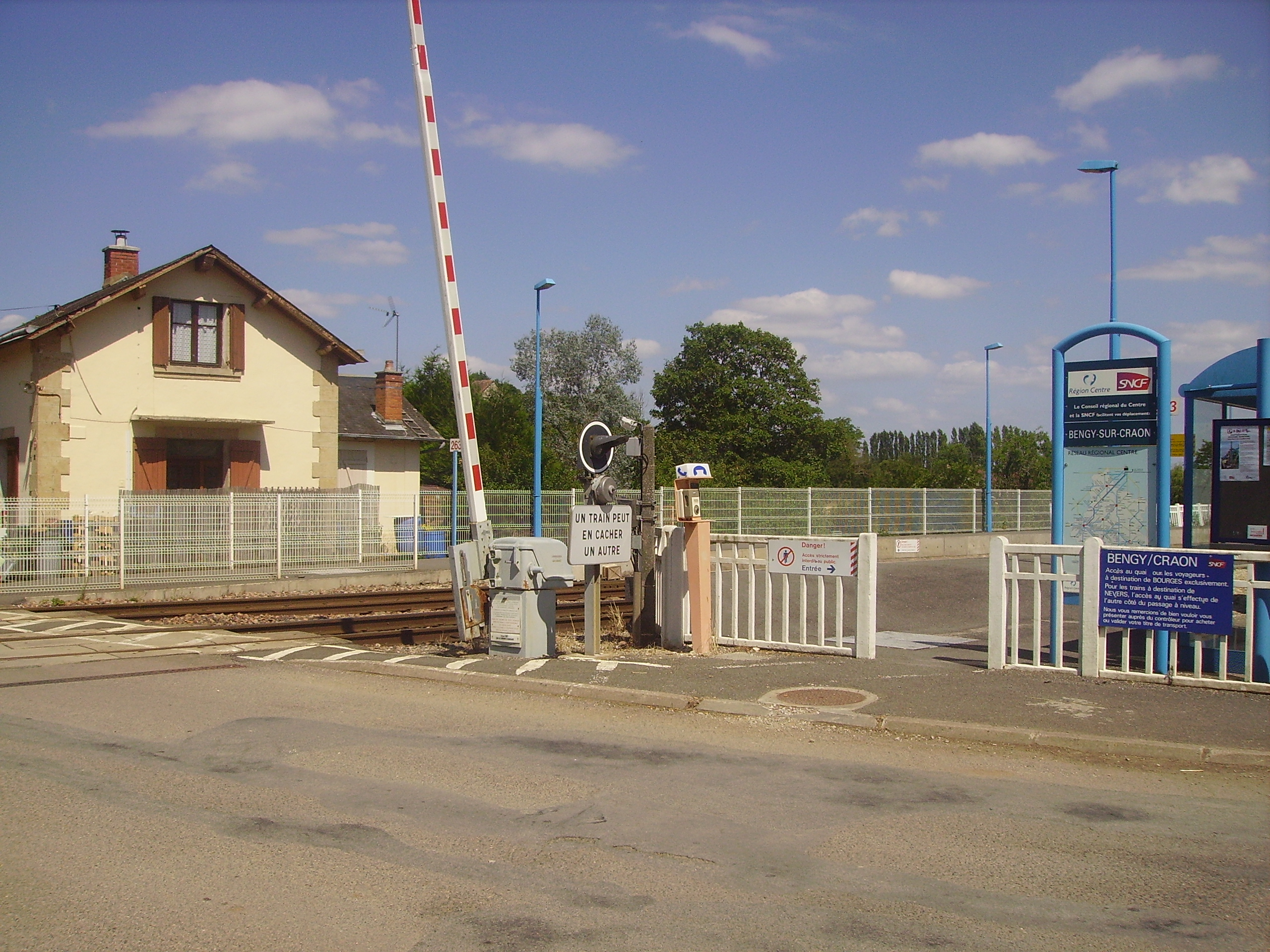
- Railway station
- Location of Bengy-sur-Craon
- Location within France Location within Centre-Val de Loire
- Coordinates: 47°00′04″N 2°44′55″E
- Country: France
- Region: Centre-Val de Loire
- Department: Cher
- Arrondissement: Bourges
- Canton: Avord
- Intercommunality: CC Pays de Nérondes

Government
  - Mayor (2020–2026): Denis Durand
- Area^{1}: 35.24 km^{2} (13.61 sq mi)
- Elevation: 186 m (610 ft)
- Highest elevation: 230 m (750 ft)
- Lowest elevation: 173 m (568 ft)
- Population (2023): 628
  - Density: 17.8/km^{2} (46.2/sq mi)
- Time zone: UTC+01:00 (CET)
  - Summer (DST): UTC+02:00 (CEST)
- INSEE/Postal code: 18027 /18520
- ^{1} French Land Register data, which excludes lakes, ponds, glaciers > 1 km^{2} (0.386 sq mi or 247 acres) and river estuaries.

Bengy-sur-Craon (French pronunciation: [bɑ̃ʒi syʁ kʁɑ̃]) is a commune in the Cher department in the Centre-Val de Loire region of France.

== Geography ==
A farming area comprising the village and three hamlets situated by the banks of the river Craon, some 15 miles (24 km) southeast of Bourges at the junction of the D976 with the D102 and D10e roads. The commune is served by a TER railway link to Bourges.

The river Airain forms part of the commune's southeastern border.

== Population ==
Historical population
Year	Pop.	±% p.a.
1968	700	—
1975	602	−2.13%
1982	584	−0.43%
1990	576	−0.17%
1999	609	+0.62%
2007	663	+1.07%
2012	679	+0.48%
2017	663	−0.48%
2023	628	−0.90%
Source: INSEE

== Sights ==
- The oldest parts of the church of St.Pierre, the choir, dates from the twelfth century. The west door is 13th century. The two-storey bell tower, possibly inspired by an earlier form, is modern. It has been listed since 1913 as a monument historique by the French Ministry of Culture.
- Roman remains, including a mosaic.
- A barn at Champ des Vignes, built 1731, is typical of the region. It has been listed since 1989 as a monument historique.
- The medieval site at Bouchetin.

== See also ==
- Communes of the Cher department
