= Menetou-Couture =

- Commune
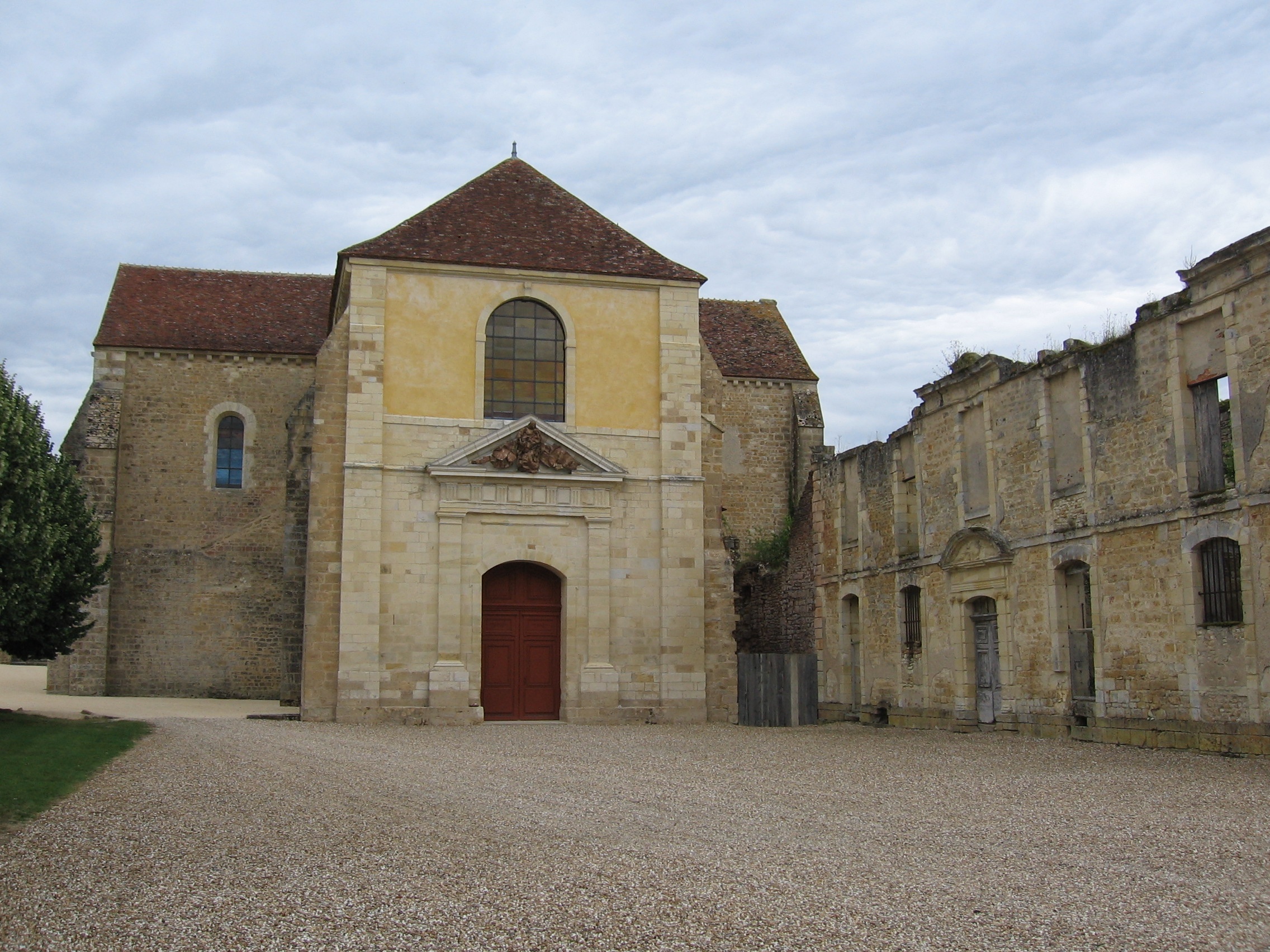
- The abbey church of Fontmorigny, in Menetou-Couture

- Coat of arms
- Location of Menetou-Couture
- Location within France Location within Centre-Val de Loire
- Coordinates: 47°02′46″N 2°54′55″E
- Country: France
- Region: Centre-Val de Loire
- Department: Cher
- Arrondissement: Saint-Amand-Montrond
- Canton: La Guerche-sur-l'Aubois

Government
  - Mayor (2020–2026): Jean-Pierre Ratillon
- Area^{1}: 28.93 km^{2} (11.17 sq mi)
- Elevation: 205 m (673 ft)
- Highest elevation: 212 m (696 ft)
- Lowest elevation: 176 m (577 ft)
- Population (2023): 343
  - Density: 11.9/km^{2} (30.7/sq mi)
- Time zone: UTC+01:00 (CET)
  - Summer (DST): UTC+02:00 (CEST)
- INSEE/Postal code: 18143 /18320
- ^{1} French Land Register data, which excludes lakes, ponds, glaciers > 1 km^{2} (0.386 sq mi or 247 acres) and river estuaries.

Menetou-Couture (French pronunciation: [mɛntu kutyʁ]) is a commune in the Cher department in the Centre-Val de Loire region of France.

== Geography ==
An area of lakes and streams, forestry and farming comprising the village and several hamlets, situated by the banks of the small river Liseron, some 22 miles (35 km) east of Bourges, at the junction of the D12 with the D189 and the D48 roads.

== Population ==
Historical population
Year	Pop.	±% p.a.
1968	477	—
1975	394	−2.69%
1982	369	−0.93%
1990	356	−0.45%
1999	316	−1.32%
2007	341	+0.96%
2012	350	+0.52%
2017	365	+0.84%
2023	343	−1.03%
Source: INSEE

== Sights ==
=== Historic sites ===
- The church of St. Caprais, dating from the twelfth century
- The fifteenth-century chateau of Menetou-Couture.
- The ruins of the 12th-century abbey of Notre-Dame at Fontmorigny.

== See also ==
- Communes of the Cher department
