= Lugny-Bourbonnais =

- Part of Osmery
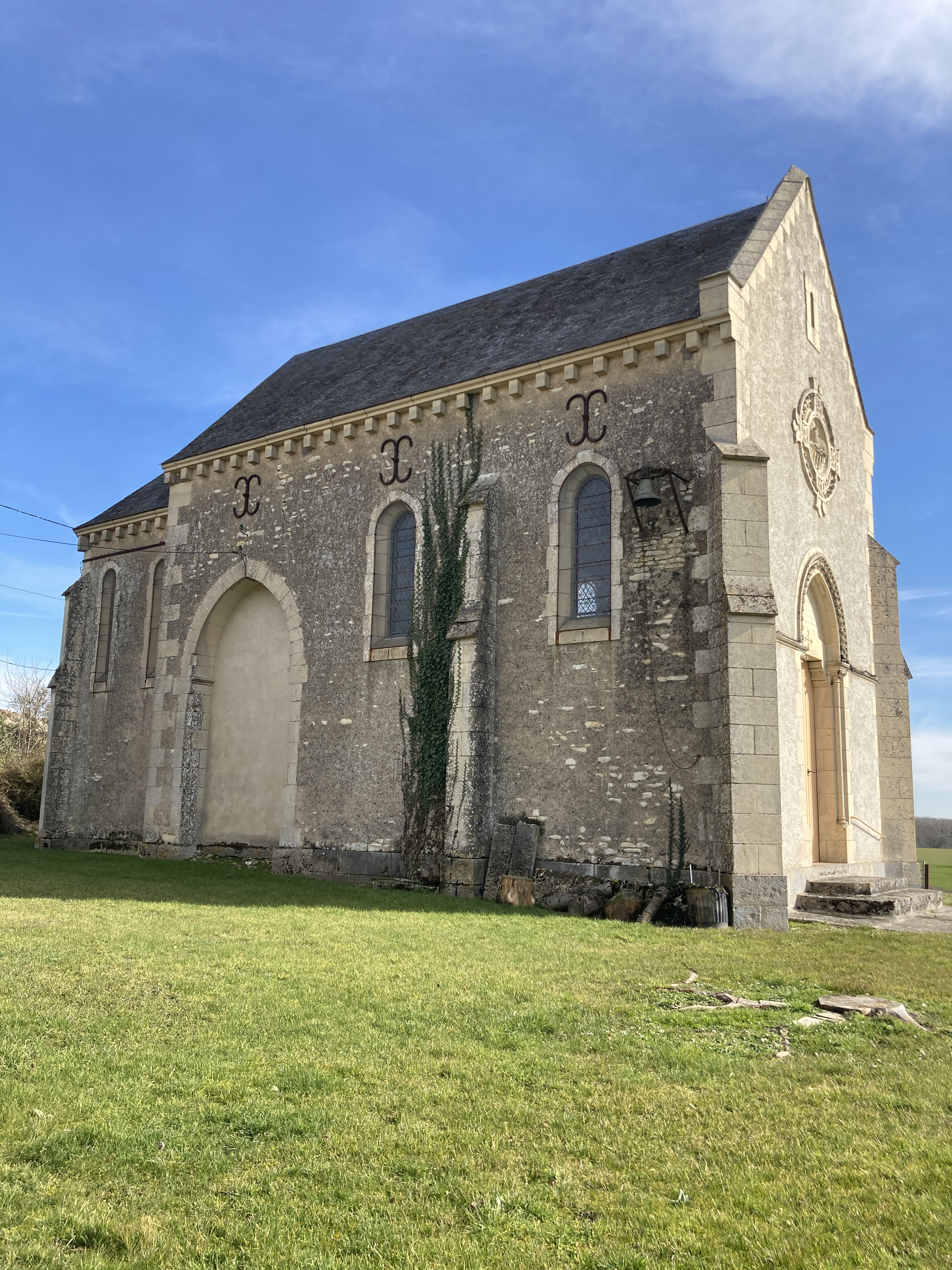
- Location of Lugny-Bourbonnais
- Location within France Location within Centre-Val de Loire
- Coordinates: 46°55′57″N 2°42′21″E
- Country: France
- Region: Centre-Val de Loire
- Department: Cher
- Arrondissement: Saint-Amand-Montrond
- Canton: La Guerche-sur-l'Aubois
- Commune: Osmery
- Area^{1}: 5.33 km^{2} (2.06 sq mi)
- Elevation: 195 m (640 ft)
- Highest elevation: 204 m (669 ft)
- Lowest elevation: 169 m (554 ft)
- Population (2021): 34
  - Density: 6.4/km^{2} (17/sq mi)
- Time zone: UTC+01:00 (CET)
  - Summer (DST): UTC+02:00 (CEST)
- Postal code: 18350
- ^{1} French Land Register data, which excludes lakes, ponds, glaciers > 1 km^{2} (0.386 sq mi or 247 acres) and river estuaries.

Lugny-Bourbonnais (French pronunciation: [lyɲi buʁbɔnɛ]) is a former commune in the Cher department in the Centre-Val de Loire region of France by the banks of the river Airain about 16 miles (26 km) southeast of Bourges. On 1 January 2024, it was merged into the commune of Osmery.

== Population ==
Historical population
| Year | Pop. | ±% p.a. |
|---|---|---|
| 1968 | 45 | — |
| 1975 | 35 | −3.53% |
| 1982 | 35 | +0.00% |
| 1990 | 33 | −0.73% |
| 1999 | 27 | −2.21% |
| 2009 | 33 | +2.03% |
| 2014 | 37 | +2.31% |
| 2020 | 34 | −1.40% |
Source: INSEE

== See also ==
- Communes of the Cher department
