= Saint-Hilaire-de-Gondilly =

- Commune
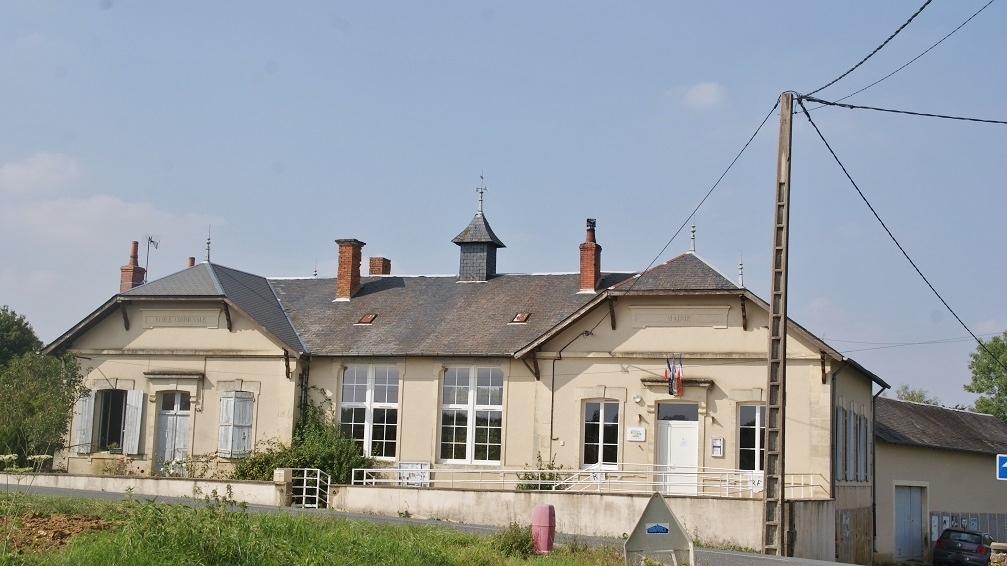
- Town hall
- Location of Saint-Hilaire-de-Gondilly
- Location within France Location within Centre-Val de Loire
- Coordinates: 47°03′01″N 2°53′14″E
- Country: France
- Region: Centre-Val de Loire
- Department: Cher
- Arrondissement: Saint-Amand-Montrond
- Canton: La Guerche-sur-l'Aubois

Government
  - Mayor (2020–2026): Karelle Hanquiez
- Area^{1}: 18.42 km^{2} (7.11 sq mi)
- Elevation: 225 m (738 ft)
- Highest elevation: 251 m (823 ft)
- Lowest elevation: 184 m (604 ft)
- Population (2023): 134
  - Density: 7.27/km^{2} (18.8/sq mi)
- Time zone: UTC+01:00 (CET)
  - Summer (DST): UTC+02:00 (CEST)
- INSEE/Postal code: 18215 /18320
- ^{1} French Land Register data, which excludes lakes, ponds, glaciers > 1 km^{2} (0.386 sq mi or 247 acres) and river estuaries.

Saint-Hilaire-de-Gondilly (French pronunciation: [sɛ̃.t‿ilɛʁ də ɡɔ̃diji]) is a commune in the Cher department in the Centre-Val de Loire region of France.

== Geography ==
A farming area comprising the village and two hamlets situated some 20 miles (32 km) east of Bourges at the junction of the D48 with the D12 and the D26 roads.

== Population ==
Historical population
Year	Pop.	±% p.a.
1968	242	—
1975	183	−3.91%
1982	155	−2.34%
1990	156	+0.08%
1999	190	+2.21%
2007	198	+0.52%
2012	178	−2.11%
2017	179	+0.11%
2023	134	−4.71%
Source: INSEE

== Sights ==
- The church of St. Hilaire, dating from the twelfth century.

== See also ==
- Communes of the Cher department
