= Ignol =

- Commune
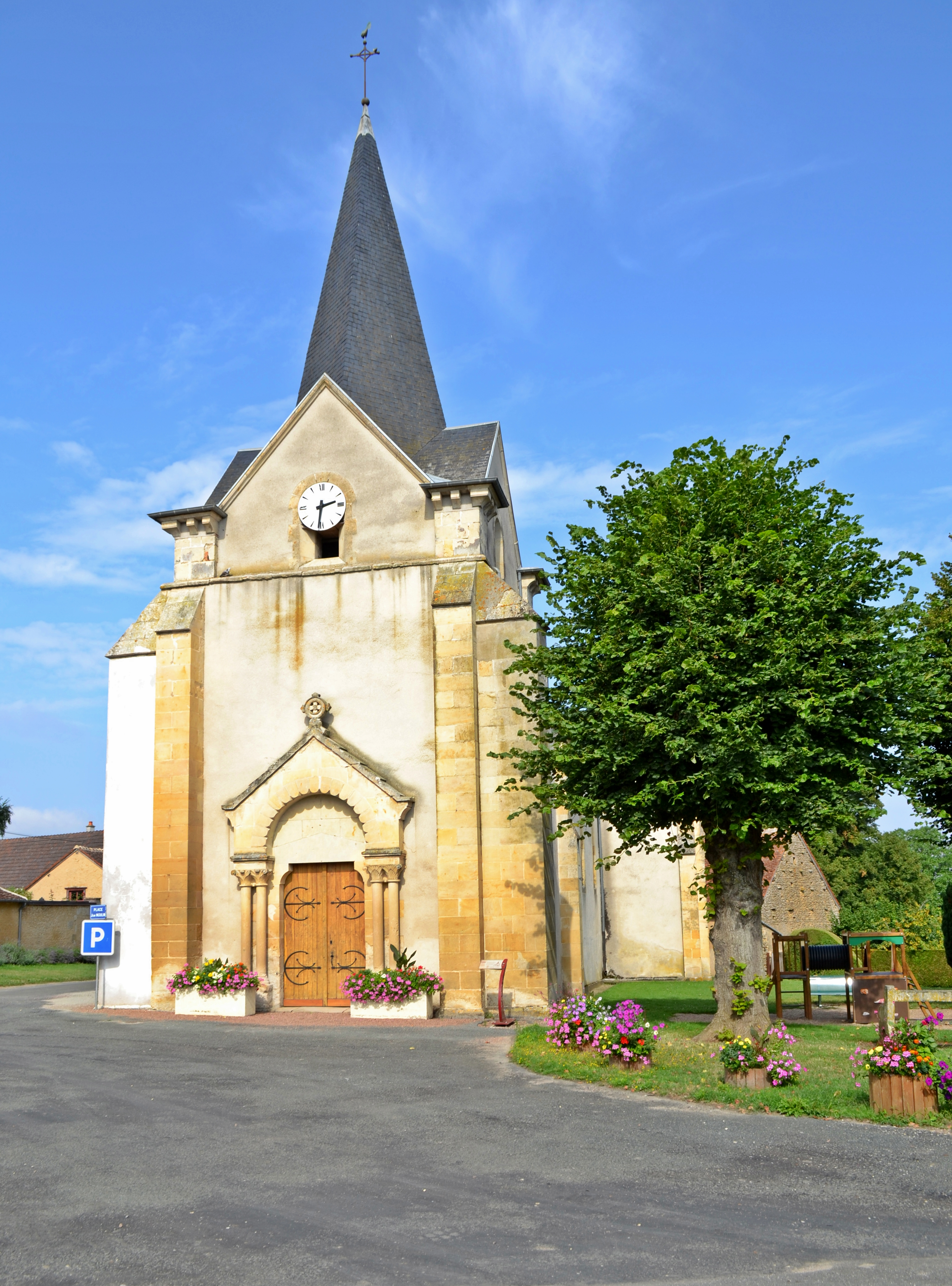
- The church in Ignol
- Location of Ignol
- Location within France Location within Centre-Val de Loire
- Coordinates: 46°58′03″N 2°50′50″E
- Country: France
- Region: Centre-Val de Loire
- Department: Cher
- Arrondissement: Saint-Amand-Montrond
- Canton: La Guerche-sur-l'Aubois
- Intercommunality: CC Pays de Nérondes

Government
  - Mayor (2020–2026): Lucien Sauvette
- Area^{1}: 17.67 km^{2} (6.82 sq mi)
- Elevation: 210 m (690 ft)
- Highest elevation: 266 m (873 ft)
- Lowest elevation: 186 m (610 ft)
- Population (2023): 173
  - Density: 9.79/km^{2} (25.4/sq mi)
- Time zone: UTC+01:00 (CET)
  - Summer (DST): UTC+02:00 (CEST)
- INSEE/Postal code: 18113 /18350
- ^{1} French Land Register data, which excludes lakes, ponds, glaciers > 1 km^{2} (0.386 sq mi or 247 acres) and river estuaries.

Ignol (French pronunciation: [iɲɔl]) is a commune in the Cher department in the Centre-Val de Loire region of France.

== Geography ==
A farming area comprising the village and several hamlets situated some 22 miles (35 km) southeast of Bourges on the D43 road.

== Population ==
Historical population
| Year | Pop. | ±% p.a. |
|---|---|---|
| 1968 | 240 | — |
| 1975 | 198 | −2.71% |
| 1982 | 179 | −1.43% |
| 1990 | 169 | −0.72% |
| 1999 | 178 | +0.58% |
| 2007 | 159 | −1.40% |
| 2012 | 181 | +2.63% |
| 2017 | 180 | −0.11% |
| 2023 | 173 | −0.66% |
Source: INSEE

== Sights ==
- The church of St. Julien, dating from the fourteenth century.
- The fifteenth-century chateau of Marcy.

== See also ==
- Communes of the Cher department
