= Boulleret =

- Commune
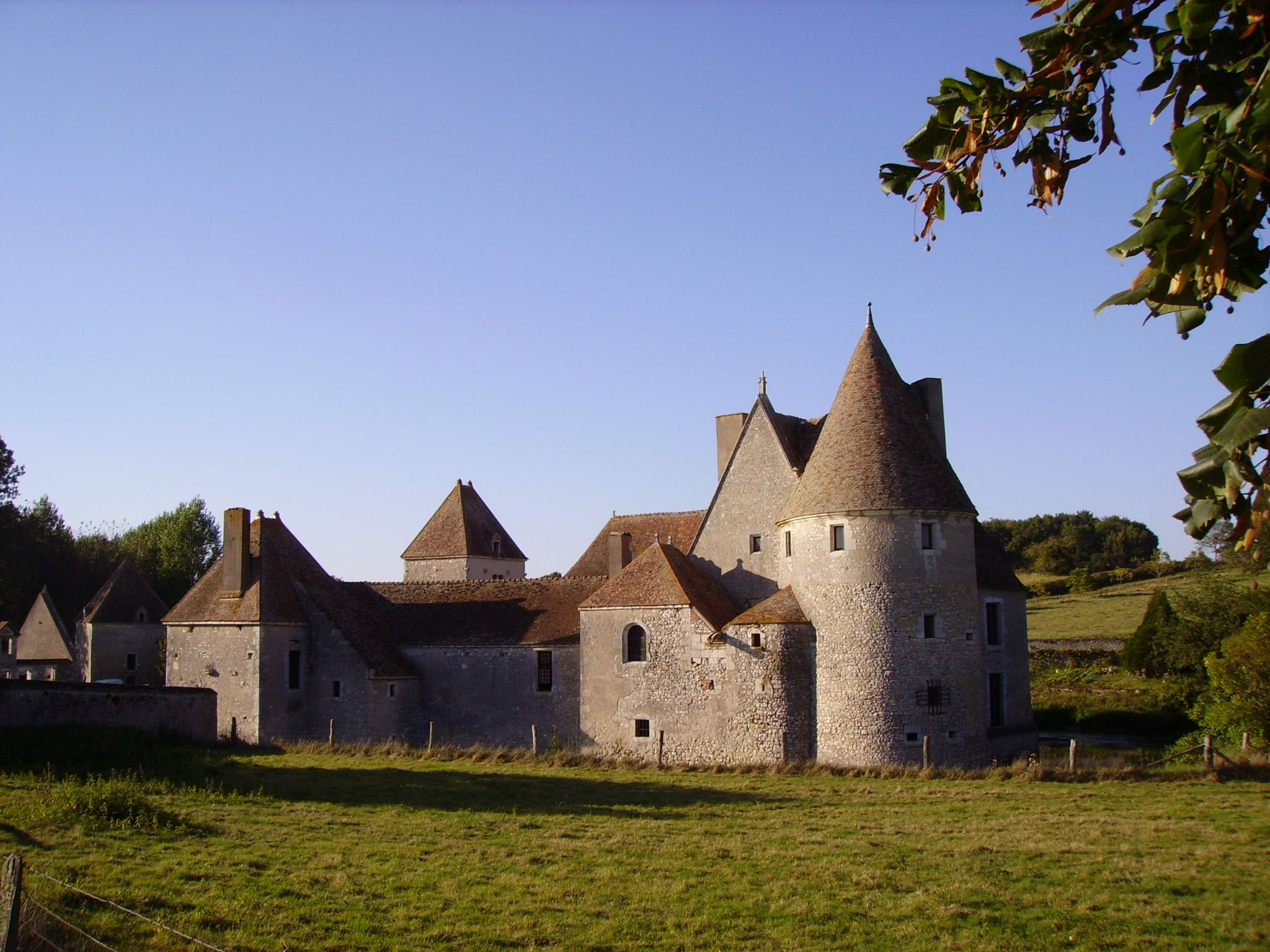
- Chateau of Buranlure
- Location of Boulleret
- Location within France Location within Centre-Val de Loire
- Coordinates: 47°25′30″N 2°52′24″E
- Country: France
- Region: Centre-Val de Loire
- Department: Cher
- Arrondissement: Bourges
- Canton: Sancerre
- Intercommunality: CC Pays Fort Sancerrois Val de Loire

Government
  - Mayor (2020–2026): Jean-Louis Billaut
- Area^{1}: 32.71 km^{2} (12.63 sq mi)
- Elevation: 180 m (590 ft)
- Highest elevation: 203 m (666 ft)
- Lowest elevation: 135 m (443 ft)
- Population (2023): 1,397
  - Density: 42.71/km^{2} (110.6/sq mi)
- Time zone: UTC+01:00 (CET)
  - Summer (DST): UTC+02:00 (CEST)
- INSEE/Postal code: 18032 /18240
- ^{1} French Land Register data, which excludes lakes, ponds, glaciers > 1 km^{2} (0.386 sq mi or 247 acres) and river estuaries.

Boulleret (French pronunciation: [bulʁɛ]) is a commune in the Cher department in the Centre-Val de Loire region of France.

== Geography ==
An area of lakes and streams, forestry and farming, comprising the village and three hamlets situated in the Loire valley some 31 miles (50 km) northeast of Bourges at the junction of the D751 with the D153 and D13 roads.

== Population ==
Historical population
Year	Pop.	±% p.a.
1968	1,342	—
1975	1,345	+0.03%
1982	1,417	+0.75%
1990	1,433	+0.14%
1999	1,421	−0.09%
2007	1,398	−0.20%
2012	1,349	−0.71%
2017	1,436	+1.26%
2023	1,397	−0.46%
Source: INSEE

== Sights ==
- The church of St. Marie-Madeleine, dating from the fifteenth century.
- Roman remains at Peseau.
- The fifteenth-century castle of Buranlure.
- Several ancient houses.
- The Château du Peseau, dating from the fourteenth century.

== See also ==
- Communes of the Cher department
