= Flavigny, Cher =

Flavigny
- Commune
- Coat of arms
- Location of Flavigny
- Location within France Location within Centre-Val de Loire
- Coordinates: 46°58′05″N 2°48′07″E
- Country: France
- Region: Centre-Val de Loire
- Department: Cher
- Arrondissement: Saint-Amand-Montrond
- Canton: La Guerche-sur-l'Aubois
- Intercommunality: Pays de Nérondes

Government
  - Mayor (2020–2026): Béatrice Allibert
- Area^{1}: 13.06 km^{2} (5.04 sq mi)
- Elevation: 194 m (636 ft)
- Highest elevation: 245 m (804 ft)
- Lowest elevation: 174 m (571 ft)
- Population (2023): 150
  - Density: 11/km^{2} (30/sq mi)
- Time zone: UTC+01:00 (CET)
  - Summer (DST): UTC+02:00 (CEST)
- INSEE/Postal code: 18095 /18350
- ^{1} French Land Register data, which excludes lakes, ponds, glaciers > 1 km^{2} (0.386 sq mi or 247 acres) and river estuaries.

Flavigny (French pronunciation: [flaviɲi]) is a commune in the Cher department in the Centre-Val de Loire region of France.

== Geography ==
An area of forestry and farming, comprising the village and a couple of hamlets situated some 18 miles (29 km) southeast of Bourges at the junction of the D10e, D6 and the D42 roads. The river Airain forms all of the commune's western border.

== Population ==
Historical population
Year	Pop.	±% p.a.
1968	214	—
1975	192	−1.54%
1982	204	+0.87%
1990	172	−2.11%
1999	184	+0.75%
2007	197	+0.86%
2012	204	+0.70%
2017	205	+0.10%
2023	150	−5.07%
Source: INSEE

== Sights ==
- The twelfth-century church of St. Germain.
- The Chateau de Bar, dating from the fifteenth century.

== See also ==
- Communes of the Cher department
