= Cornusse =

- Commune
- Location of Cornusse
- Location within France Location within Centre-Val de Loire
- Coordinates: 46°57′19″N 2°43′54″E
- Country: France
- Region: Centre-Val de Loire
- Department: Cher
- Arrondissement: Saint-Amand-Montrond
- Canton: La Guerche-sur-l'Aubois
- Intercommunality: Pays de Nérondes

Government
  - Mayor (2020–2026): Edith Raquin
- Area^{1}: 19.61 km^{2} (7.57 sq mi)
- Elevation: 208 m (682 ft)
- Highest elevation: 228 m (748 ft)
- Lowest elevation: 172 m (564 ft)
- Population (2023): 226
  - Density: 11.5/km^{2} (29.8/sq mi)
- Time zone: UTC+01:00 (CET)
  - Summer (DST): UTC+02:00 (CEST)
- INSEE/Postal code: 18072 /18350
- ^{1} French Land Register data, which excludes lakes, ponds, glaciers > 1 km^{2} (0.386 sq mi or 247 acres) and river estuaries.

Cornusse (French pronunciation: [kɔʁnys]) is a commune in the Cher department in the Centre-Val de Loire region of France.

== Geography ==
A farming area comprising the village and two hamlets situated some 16 miles (26 km) southeast of Bourges at the junction of the D15 and D102 roads. The river Airain forms all of the commune's eastern border.

== Population ==
Historical population
Year	Pop.	±% p.a.
1968	390	—
1975	340	−1.94%
1982	355	+0.62%
1990	283	−2.79%
1999	291	+0.31%
2007	281	−0.44%
2012	272	−0.65%
2017	268	−0.30%
2023	226	−2.80%
Source: INSEE

== Sights ==
- The church of St. Martin, dating from the nineteenth century.
- A museum.
- The chateau, dating from the fifteenth century, now a medical institute.

== See also ==
- Communes of the Cher department

== Bibliography ==
Françoise Gicquiaud Cornusse, un château, un village, dans l'histoire du Berry. The « Villa de Cornossa », The « Seigneurie de Cornusse » 404 pages, 85 illustrations. ISBN 2-9513414-3-1
