= Blet =

- Commune
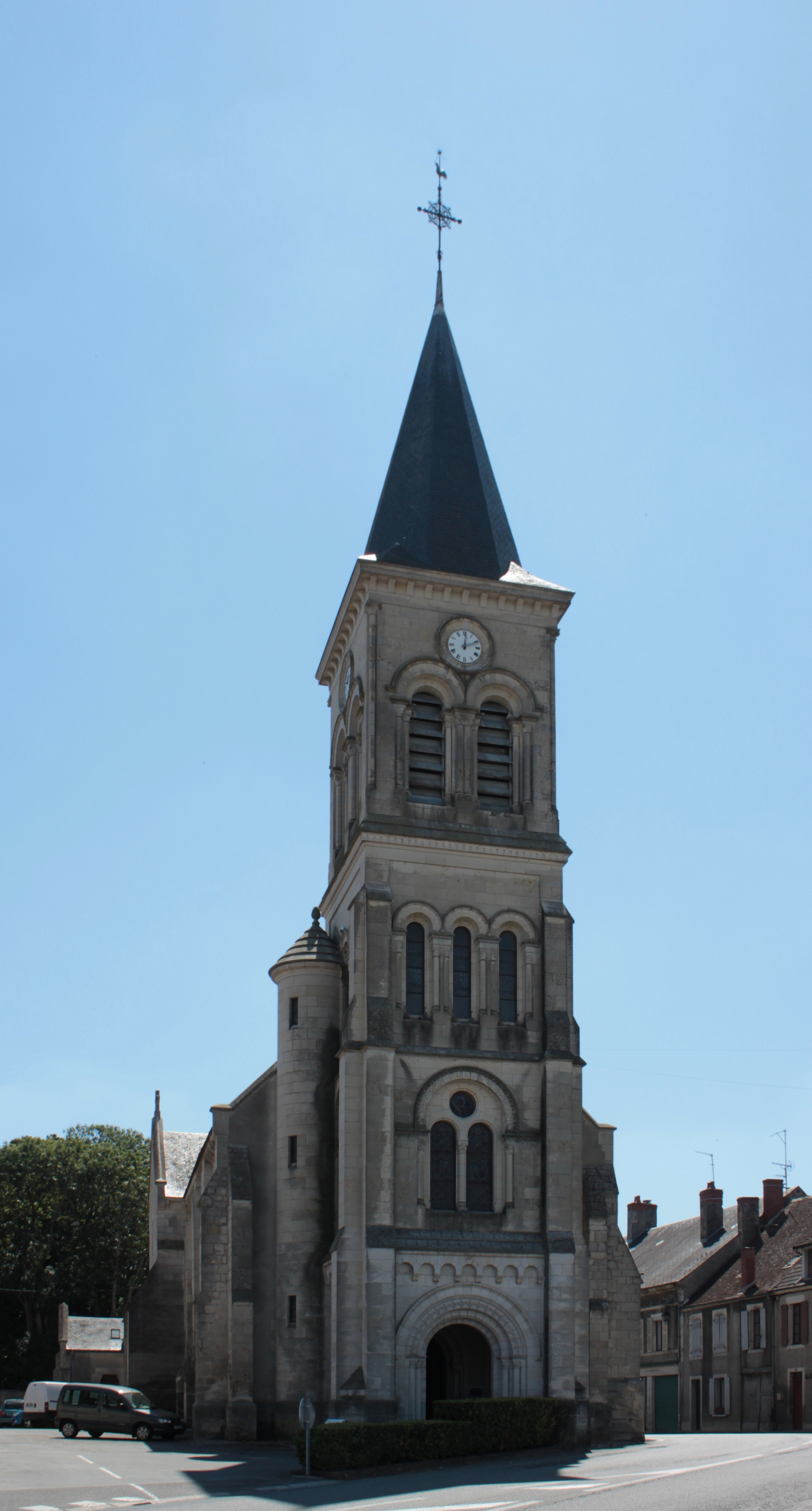
- The church of Saint-Germain, in Blet
- Location of Blet
- Location within France Location within Centre-Val de Loire
- Coordinates: 46°53′46″N 2°43′56″E
- Country: France
- Region: Centre-Val de Loire
- Department: Cher
- Arrondissement: Saint-Amand-Montrond
- Canton: La Guerche-sur-l'Aubois
- Intercommunality: CC Pays de Nérondes

Government
  - Mayor (2020–2026): Sandrine Proust
- Area^{1}: 30.08 km^{2} (11.61 sq mi)
- Highest elevation: 256 m (840 ft)
- Lowest elevation: 170 m (560 ft)
- Population (2023): 566
  - Density: 18.8/km^{2} (48.7/sq mi)
- Time zone: UTC+01:00 (CET)
  - Summer (DST): UTC+02:00 (CEST)
- INSEE/Postal code: 18031 /18350
- ^{1} French Land Register data, which excludes lakes, ponds, glaciers > 1 km^{2} (0.386 sq mi or 247 acres) and river estuaries.

Blet (French pronunciation: [blɛ]) is a commune in the Cher department in the Centre-Val de Loire region of France.

== Geography ==
A farming area comprising a village and several hamlets situated some 20 miles (32 km) southeast of Bourges at the junction of the N76 with the D91 and the D6 roads.

== Population ==
Historical population
Year	Pop.	±% p.a.
1968	730	—
1975	749	+0.37%
1982	713	−0.70%
1990	689	−0.43%
1999	617	−1.22%
2007	635	+0.36%
2012	652	+0.53%
2017	575	−2.48%
2023	566	−0.26%
Source: INSEE

== Sights ==
- The church of St. Germain, dating from the twelfth century.
- An early nineteenth-century market hall.
- Traces of a Roman aqueduct.
- The fifteenth-century château and park.

== See also ==
- Communes of the Cher department
