= Canton of La Guerche-sur-l'Aubois =

Coordinates: 46°57′7″N 2°56′54″E

La Guerche-sur-l'Aubois
- Canton
- Interactive map of La Guerche-sur-l'Aubois
- Country: France
- Region: Centre-Val de Loire
- Department: Cher
- No. of communes: {{{nbcomm}}}
- Area: 479.09 km^{2} (184.98 sq mi)
- Population (2023): 12,547
  - Density: 26.189/km^{2} (67.830/sq mi)
- INSEE code: 18 10

The Canton of La Guerche-sur-l'Aubois is a canton situated in the Cher département and in the Centre-Val de Loire region of France.

== Geography ==
An area of forestry and farming in the valley of the Aubois river, in the northeastern part of the arrondissement of Saint-Amand-Montrond centred on the town of La Guerche-sur-l'Aubois.

== Composition ==
At the French canton reorganisation which came into effect in March 2015, the canton was expanded from 9 to 22 communes:

- Apremont-sur-Allier
- Blet
- La Chapelle-Hugon
- Charly
- Le Chautay
- Cornusse
- Cours-les-Barres
- Croisy
- Cuffy
- Flavigny
- Germigny-l'Exempt
- La Guerche-sur-l'Aubois
- Ignol
- Jouet-sur-l'Aubois
- Menetou-Couture
- Mornay-Berry
- Nérondes
- Osmery (partly)
- Ourouer-les-Bourdelins
- Saint-Hilaire-de-Gondilly
- Tendron
- Torteron

== Population ==
Historical population
Year	Pop.	±% p.a.
2013	13,614	—
2018	13,021	−0.89%
Source: INSEE

== See also ==
- Arrondissements of the Cher department
- Cantons of the Cher department
- Communes of the Cher department
