= Tendron =

- Commune
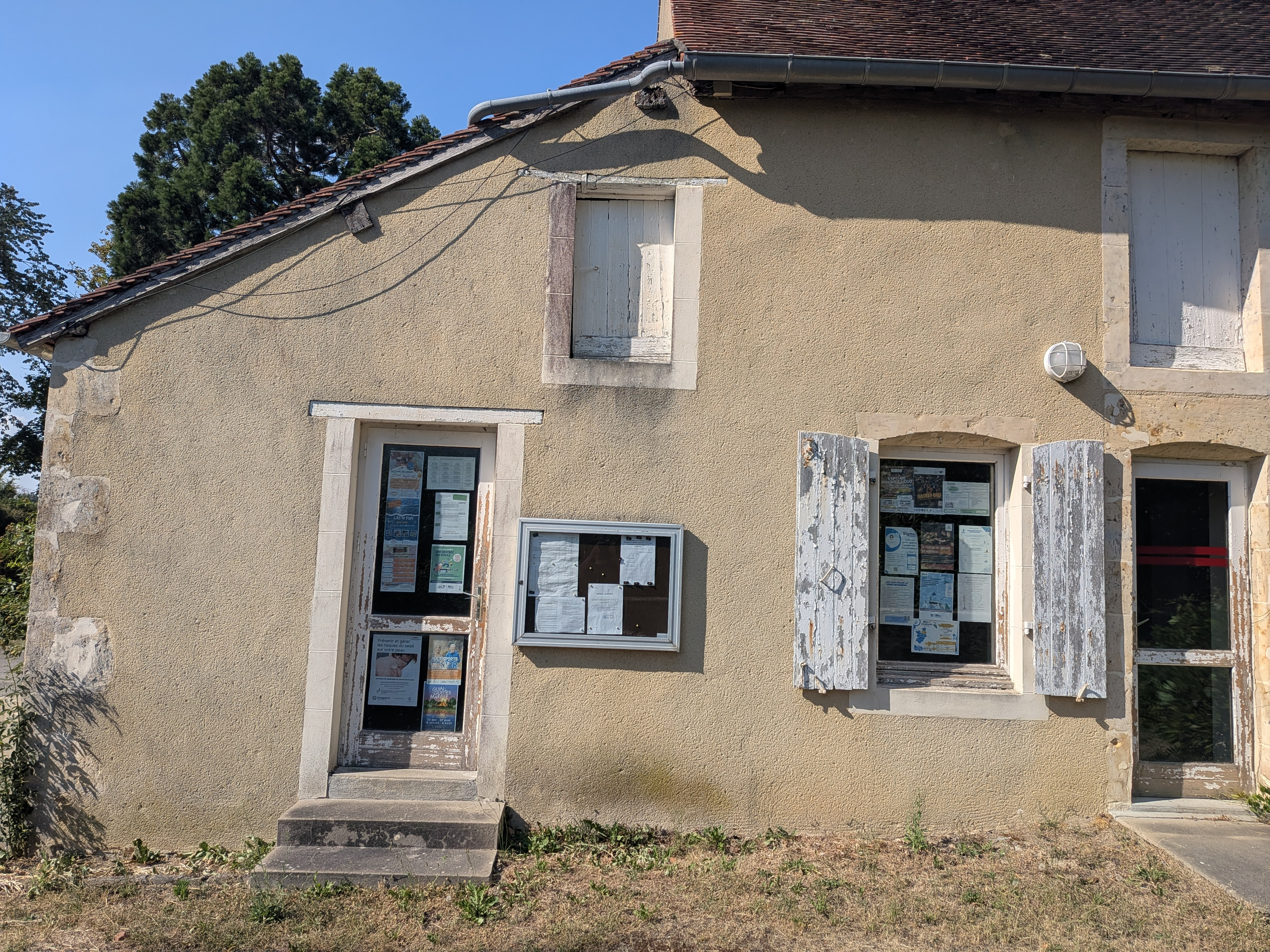
- Tendron Town hall
- Location of Tendron
- Location within France Location within Centre-Val de Loire
- Coordinates: 46°59′00″N 2°48′38″E
- Country: France
- Region: Centre-Val de Loire
- Department: Cher
- Arrondissement: Saint-Amand-Montrond
- Canton: La Guerche-sur-l'Aubois
- Intercommunality: CC Pays de Nérondes

Government
  - Mayor (2020–2026): Arnaud de Gourcuff
- Area^{1}: 10.44 km^{2} (4.03 sq mi)
- Elevation: 250 m (820 ft)
- Highest elevation: 263 m (863 ft)
- Lowest elevation: 176 m (577 ft)
- Population (2023): 86
  - Density: 8.2/km^{2} (21/sq mi)
- Time zone: UTC+01:00 (CET)
  - Summer (DST): UTC+02:00 (CEST)
- INSEE/Postal code: 18260 /18350
- ^{1} French Land Register data, which excludes lakes, ponds, glaciers > 1 km^{2} (0.386 sq mi or 247 acres) and river estuaries.

Tendron (French pronunciation: [tɑ̃dʁɔ̃]) is a commune in the Cher department in the Centre-Val de Loire region of France.

== Geography ==
It is about 23 miles (37 km) southeast of Bourges. The river Airain flows southwest through the northwestern part of the commune.

== Population ==
Historical population
| Year | Pop. | ±% p.a. |
|---|---|---|
| 1968 | 132 | — |
| 1975 | 118 | −1.59% |
| 1982 | 99 | −2.48% |
| 1990 | 122 | +2.65% |
| 1999 | 110 | −1.14% |
| 2007 | 119 | +0.99% |
| 2012 | 113 | −1.03% |
| 2017 | 93 | −3.82% |
| 2023 | 86 | −1.30% |
Source: INSEE

== See also ==
- Communes of the Cher department
