= Osmery =

- Commune
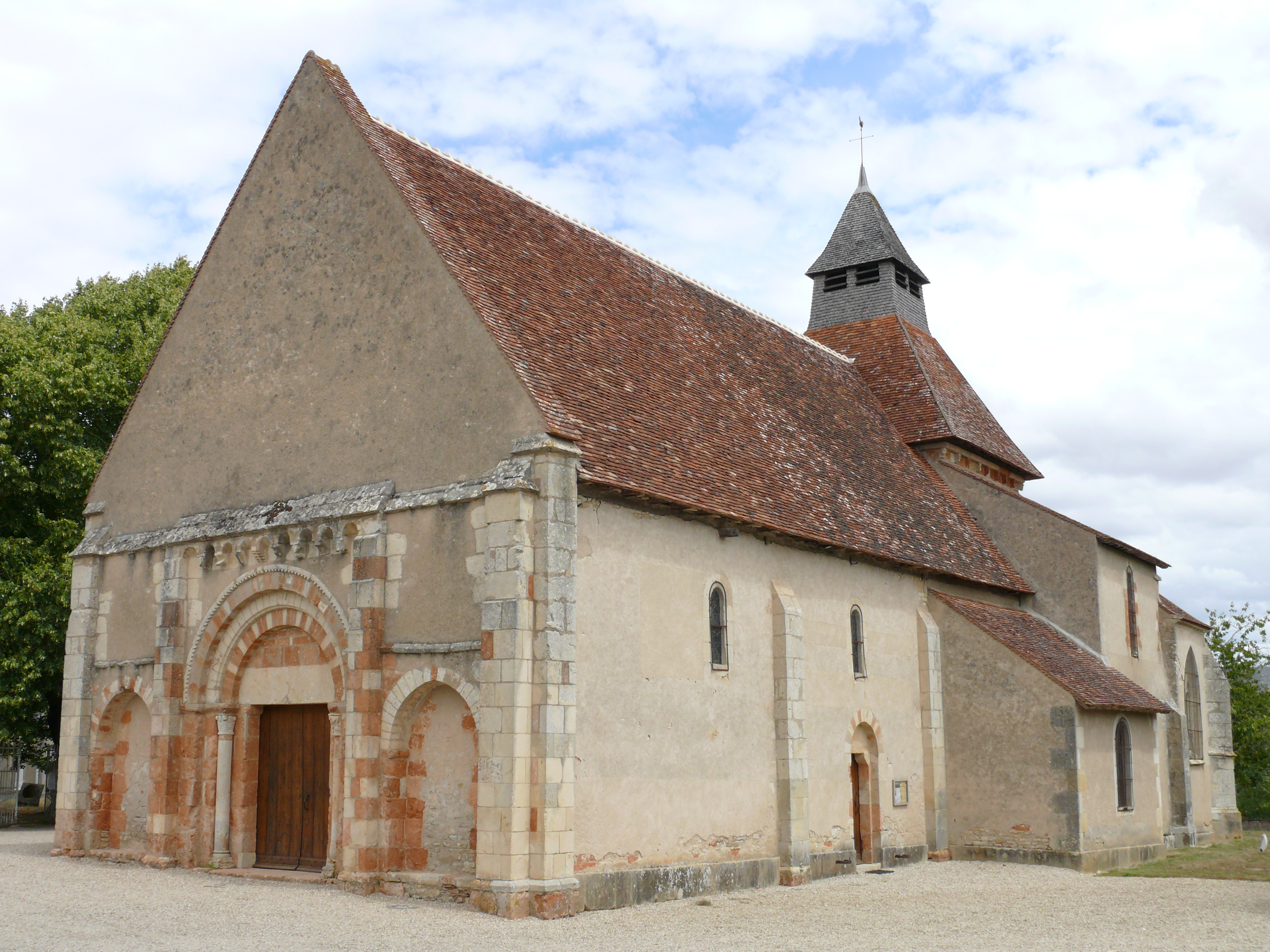
- The church of Saint-Julien, in Osmery
- Location of Osmery
- Location within France Location within Centre-Val de Loire
- Coordinates: 46°56′08″N 2°39′21″E
- Country: France
- Region: Centre-Val de Loire
- Department: Cher
- Arrondissement: Saint-Amand-Montrond
- Canton: Dun-sur-Auron
- Intercommunality: CC Le Dunois

Government
  - Mayor (2020–2026): Alain Desjean
- Area^{1}: 26.94 km^{2} (10.40 sq mi)
- Elevation: 169 m (554 ft)
- Highest elevation: 199 m (653 ft)
- Lowest elevation: 161 m (528 ft)
- Population (2023): 264
  - Density: 9.80/km^{2} (25.4/sq mi)
- Time zone: UTC+01:00 (CET)
  - Summer (DST): UTC+02:00 (CEST)
- INSEE/Postal code: 18173 /18130
- ^{1} French Land Register data, which excludes lakes, ponds, glaciers > 1 km^{2} (0.386 sq mi or 247 acres) and river estuaries.

Osmery (French pronunciation: [omʁi]) is a commune in the Cher department in the Centre-Val de Loire region of France. On 1 January 2024, the former commune of Lugny-Bourbonnais was merged into Osmery.

== Geography ==
A farming area comprising a village and several hamlets situated some 16 miles (26 km) southeast of Bourges, near the junction of the D10 with the D2076 and D166 roads. The village lies on the right bank of the Airain, which flows west-northwest through the southern part of the commune.

== Population ==
Population data refer to the commune in its geography as of January 2025.

Historical population
| Year | Pop. | ±% p.a. |
|---|---|---|
| 1968 | 464 | — |
| 1975 | 406 | −1.89% |
| 1982 | 344 | −2.34% |
| 1990 | 309 | −1.33% |
| 1999 | 281 | −1.05% |
| 2007 | 288 | +0.31% |
| 2012 | 320 | +2.13% |
| 2017 | 298 | −1.41% |
| 2023 | 264 | −2.00% |
Source: INSEE

== Sights ==
- The church of St. Julien, dating from the twelfth century
- The fifteenth-century chateau of Défens
- A seventeenth-century chapel

== See also ==
- Communes of the Cher department
