= Charly, Cher =

Charly
- Commune
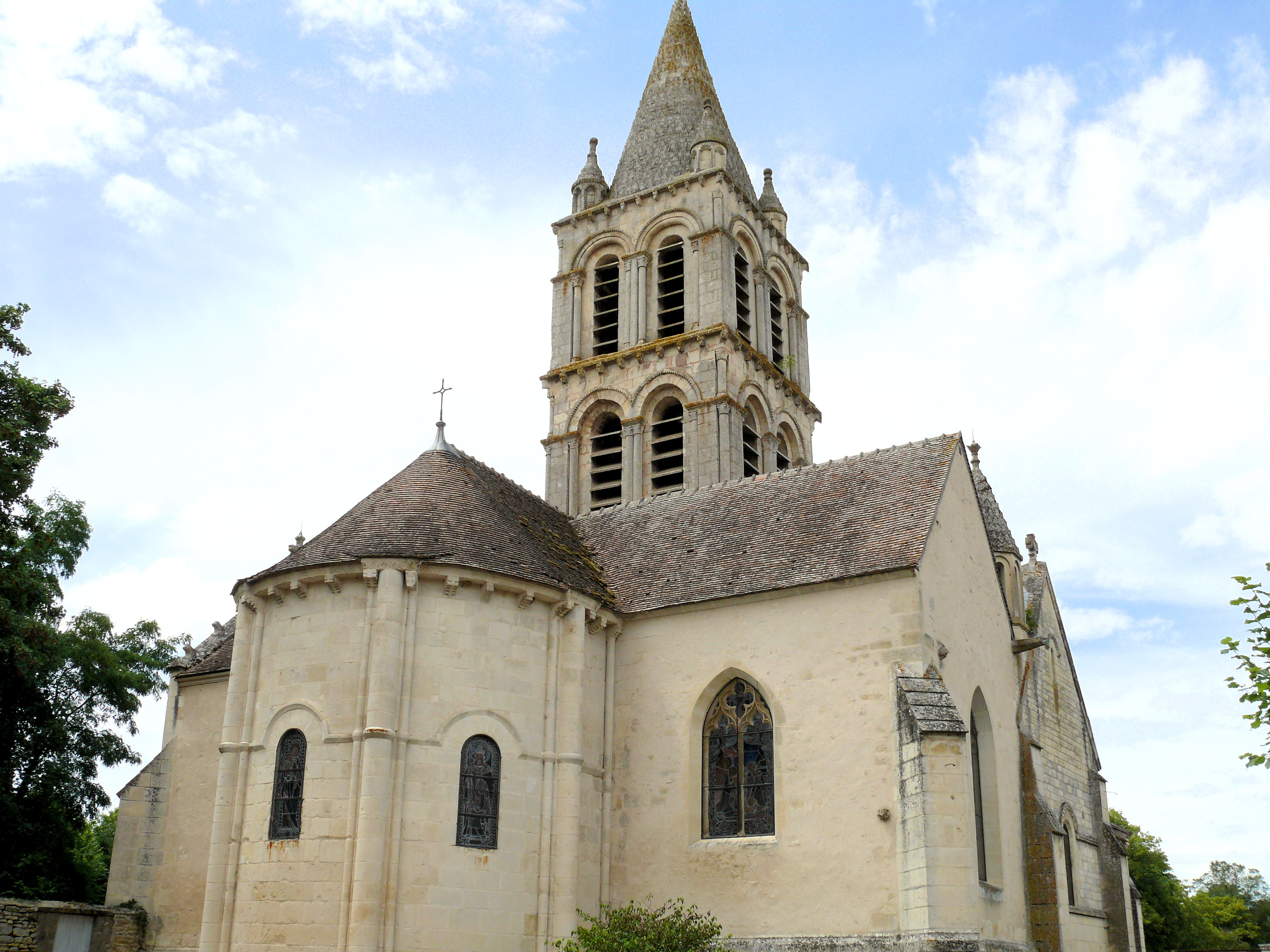
- The church of Our Lady, in Charly
- Location of Charly
- Location within France Location within Centre-Val de Loire
- Coordinates: 46°54′00″N 2°44′59″E
- Country: France
- Region: Centre-Val de Loire
- Department: Cher
- Arrondissement: Saint-Amand-Montrond
- Canton: La Guerche-sur-l'Aubois
- Intercommunality: Pays de Nérondes

Government
  - Mayor (2020–2026): Dominique Régnault
- Area^{1}: 25.66 km^{2} (9.91 sq mi)
- Elevation: 190 m (620 ft)
- Highest elevation: 256 m (840 ft)
- Lowest elevation: 169 m (554 ft)
- Population (2023): 226
  - Density: 8.81/km^{2} (22.8/sq mi)
- Time zone: UTC+01:00 (CET)
  - Summer (DST): UTC+02:00 (CEST)
- INSEE/Postal code: 18054 /18350
- ^{1} French Land Register data, which excludes lakes, ponds, glaciers > 1 km^{2} (0.386 sq mi or 247 acres) and river estuaries.

Charly (French pronunciation: [ʃaʁli]) is a commune in the Cher department in the Centre-Val de Loire region of France.

== Geography ==
A farming area comprising a village and a couple of hamlets situated some 20 miles (32 km) southeast of Bourges at the junction of the N76 with the D91 and the D6 roads. Ancient quarries here provided the stone for the cathedral of Bourges.

The river Airain forms most of the commune's northwestern boundary.

== Population ==
Historical population
Year	Pop.	±% p.a.
1968	364	—
1975	273	−4.03%
1982	272	−0.05%
1990	252	−0.95%
1999	257	+0.22%
2007	230	−1.38%
2012	241	+0.94%
2017	249	+0.66%
2023	226	−1.60%
Source: INSEE

== Sights ==
- The church of Notre-Dame, dating from the twelfth century.
- Some ancient houses.
- Remains of a Benedictine abbey.
- Two watermills

== See also ==
- Communes of the Cher department
