= Croisy =

- Commune
- Location of Croisy
- Location within France Location within Centre-Val de Loire
- Coordinates: 46°56′23″N 2°48′34″E
- Country: France
- Region: Centre-Val de Loire
- Department: Cher
- Arrondissement: Saint-Amand-Montrond
- Canton: La Guerche-sur-l'Aubois
- Intercommunality: CC Pays de Nérondes

Government
  - Mayor (2020–2026): Noël Laignel
- Area^{1}: 12.96 km^{2} (5.00 sq mi)
- Elevation: 270 m (890 ft)
- Highest elevation: 270 m (890 ft)
- Lowest elevation: 194 m (636 ft)
- Population (2023): 143
  - Density: 11.0/km^{2} (28.6/sq mi)
- Time zone: UTC+01:00 (CET)
  - Summer (DST): UTC+02:00 (CEST)
- INSEE/Postal code: 18080 /18350
- ^{1} French Land Register data, which excludes lakes, ponds, glaciers > 1 km^{2} (0.386 sq mi or 247 acres) and river estuaries.

Croisy (French pronunciation: [kʁwazi]) is a commune in the Cher department in the Centre-Val de Loire region of France about 20 miles (32 km) southeast of Bourges.

== Population ==
Historical population
Year	Pop.	±% p.a.
1968	206	—
1975	180	−1.91%
1982	149	−2.66%
1990	107	−4.05%
1999	130	+2.19%
2007	136	+0.57%
2012	153	+2.38%
2017	163	+1.27%
2023	143	−2.16%
Source: INSEE

== See also ==
- Communes of the Cher department
