= Ourouer-les-Bourdelins =

- Commune
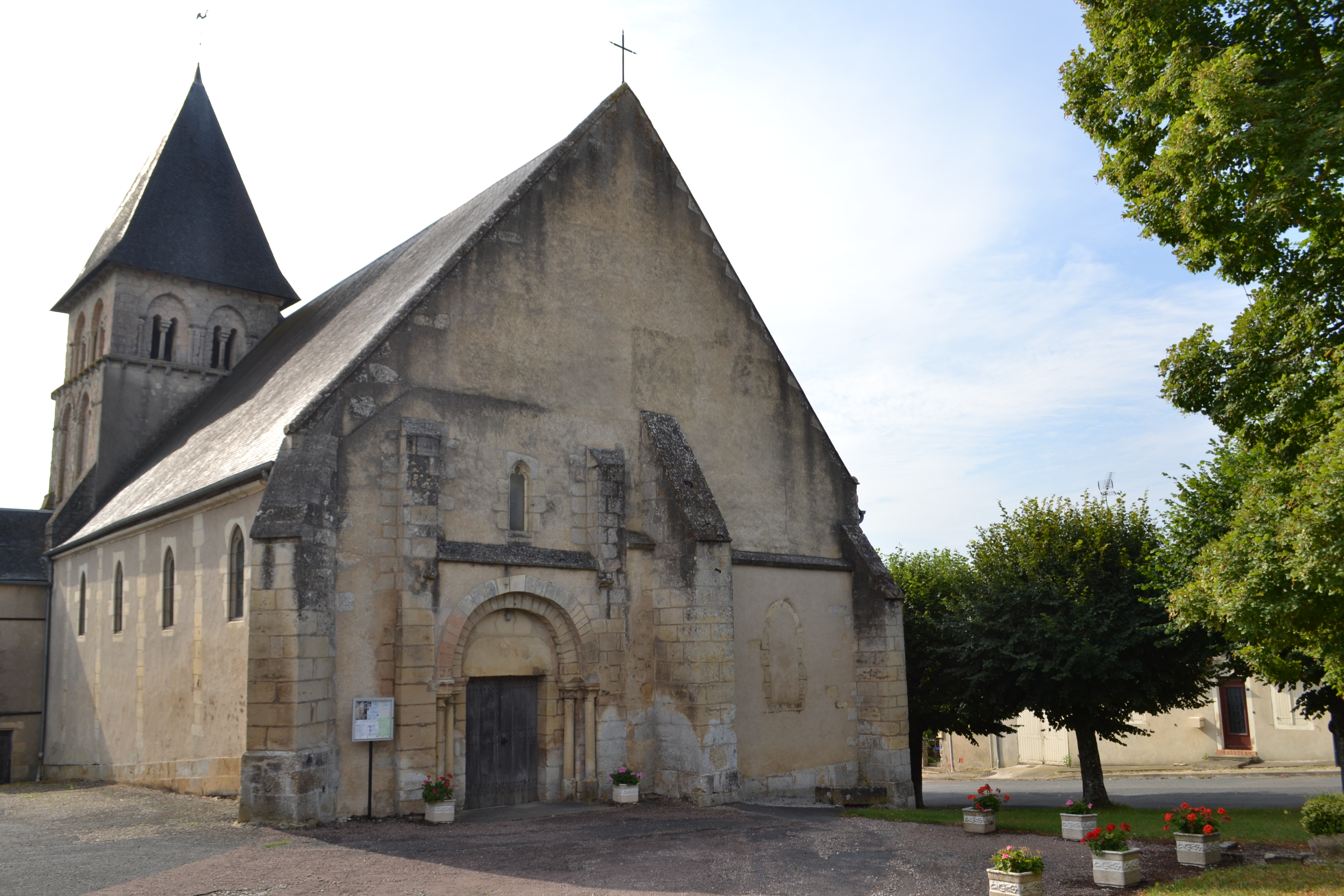
- The church in Ourouer-les-Bourdelins
- Location of Ourouer-les-Bourdelins
- Location within France Location within Centre-Val de Loire
- Coordinates: 46°55′53″N 2°47′06″E
- Country: France
- Region: Centre-Val de Loire
- Department: Cher
- Arrondissement: Saint-Amand-Montrond
- Canton: La Guerche-sur-l'Aubois
- Intercommunality: Pays de Nérondes

Government
  - Mayor (2020–2026): Sebastien Peras
- Area^{1}: 24.64 km^{2} (9.51 sq mi)
- Elevation: 210 m (690 ft)
- Highest elevation: 256 m (840 ft)
- Lowest elevation: 173 m (568 ft)
- Population (2023): 603
  - Density: 24.5/km^{2} (63.4/sq mi)
- Time zone: UTC+01:00 (CET)
  - Summer (DST): UTC+02:00 (CEST)
- INSEE/Postal code: 18175 /18350
- ^{1} French Land Register data, which excludes lakes, ponds, glaciers > 1 km^{2} (0.386 sq mi or 247 acres) and river estuaries.

Ourouer-les-Bourdelins is a commune in the Cher department in the Centre-Val de Loire region of France.

== Geography ==
A farming area comprising the village and a couple of hamlets situated some 21 miles (34 km) southeast of Bourges, at the junction of the D6 with the D15 and D109 roads. The river Airain forms all of the commune's northwestern boundary.

== Population ==
Historical population
| Year | Pop. | ±% p.a. |
|---|---|---|
| 1968 | 893 | — |
| 1975 | 813 | −1.33% |
| 1982 | 758 | −1.00% |
| 1990 | 740 | −0.30% |
| 1999 | 667 | −1.15% |
| 2007 | 646 | −0.40% |
| 2012 | 647 | +0.03% |
| 2017 | 615 | −1.01% |
| 2023 | 603 | −0.33% |
Source: INSEE

== Sights ==
- The church of St. Christophe, dating from the twelfth century.
- The fifteenth-century chateau.

== See also ==
- Communes of the Cher department
