= Nérondes =

- Commune
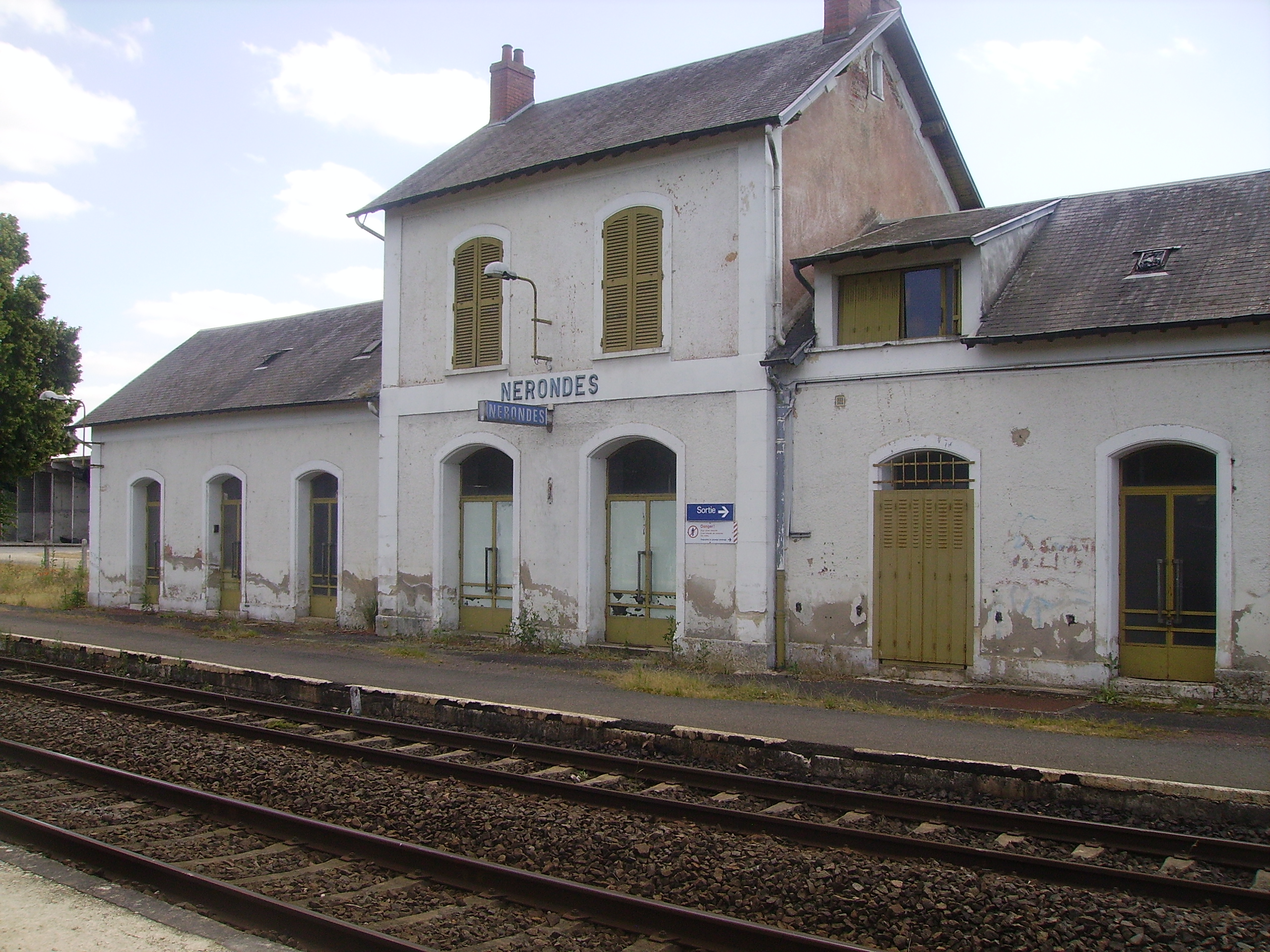
- Railway station

- Coat of arms
- Location of Nérondes
- Location within France Location within Centre-Val de Loire
- Coordinates: 46°59′54″N 2°49′13″E
- Country: France
- Region: Centre-Val de Loire
- Department: Cher
- Arrondissement: Saint-Amand-Montrond
- Canton: La Guerche-sur-l'Aubois
- Intercommunality: Pays de Nérondes

Government
  - Mayor (2020–2026): Thierry Ferrand
- Area^{1}: 34 km^{2} (13 sq mi)
- Elevation: 189 m (620 ft)
- Highest elevation: 252 m (827 ft)
- Lowest elevation: 176 m (577 ft)
- Population (2023): 1,403
  - Density: 41/km^{2} (110/sq mi)
- Time zone: UTC+01:00 (CET)
  - Summer (DST): UTC+02:00 (CEST)
- INSEE/Postal code: 18160 /18350
- ^{1} French Land Register data, which excludes lakes, ponds, glaciers > 1 km^{2} (0.386 sq mi or 247 acres) and river estuaries.

Nérondes (French pronunciation: [neʁɔ̃d]) is a commune in the Cher department in the Centre-Val de Loire region of France. The philologist Antoine Cabaton (1863–1942) was born in Nérondes.

== Geography ==
An area of lakes and streams, forestry and farming comprising a village and several hamlets situated some 20 miles (32 km) southeast of Bourges, at the junction of the D976 with the D6, D26 and D43 roads. The rivers Vauvise and Airain have their sources in the commune.

== Population ==
Historical population
Year	Pop.	±% p.a.
1968	1,306	—
1975	1,305	−0.01%
1982	1,343	+0.41%
1990	1,521	+1.57%
1999	1,618	+0.69%
2007	1,509	−0.87%
2012	1,599	+1.17%
2017	1,481	−1.52%
2023	1,403	−0.90%
Source: INSEE

== Sights ==
- The church of St. Etienne, dating from the twelfth century.
- A sixteenth-century washhouse.
- The thirteenth-century chateau of Verrières.
- Some Gallo-Roman remains.
- A feudal motte.

== See also ==
- Mornay-Berri
- Communes of the Cher department
