= Mornay-Berry =

- Commune
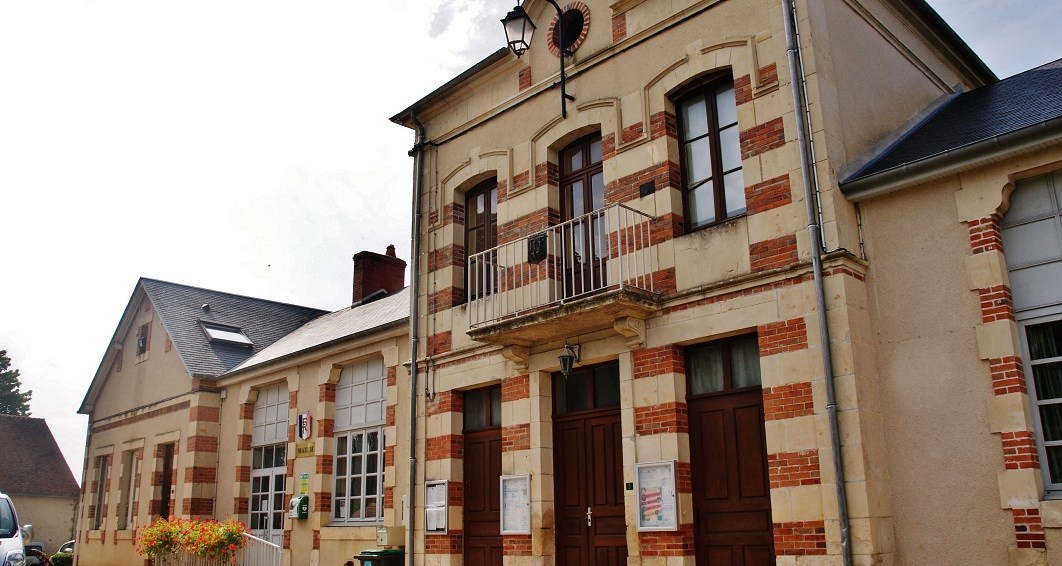
- The town hall in Mornay-Berry
- Location of Mornay-Berry
- Location within France Location within Centre-Val de Loire
- Coordinates: 47°02′59″N 2°52′19″E
- Country: France
- Region: Centre-Val de Loire
- Department: Cher
- Arrondissement: Saint-Amand-Montrond
- Canton: La Guerche-sur-l'Aubois
- Intercommunality: Pays de Nérondes

Government
  - Mayor (2020–2026): Violette Fernandes
- Area^{1}: 9.15 km^{2} (3.53 sq mi)
- Elevation: 219 m (719 ft)
- Highest elevation: 237 m (778 ft)
- Lowest elevation: 176 m (577 ft)
- Population (2023): 177
  - Density: 19.3/km^{2} (50.1/sq mi)
- Time zone: UTC+01:00 (CET)
  - Summer (DST): UTC+02:00 (CEST)
- INSEE/Postal code: 18154 /18350
- ^{1} French Land Register data, which excludes lakes, ponds, glaciers > 1 km^{2} (0.386 sq mi or 247 acres) and river estuaries.

Mornay-Berry (French pronunciation: [mɔʁnɛ beʁi]) is a commune in the Cher department in the Centre-Val de Loire region of France about 23 miles (37 km) east of Bourges.

== Population ==
Historical population
Year	Pop.	±% p.a.
1968	252	—
1975	195	−3.60%
1982	178	−1.29%
1990	153	−1.87%
1999	163	+0.71%
2007	201	+2.65%
2012	203	+0.20%
2017	183	−2.05%
2023	177	−0.55%
Source: INSEE

== See also ==
- Communes of the Cher department
