= Les Roches-l'Évêque =

- Commune
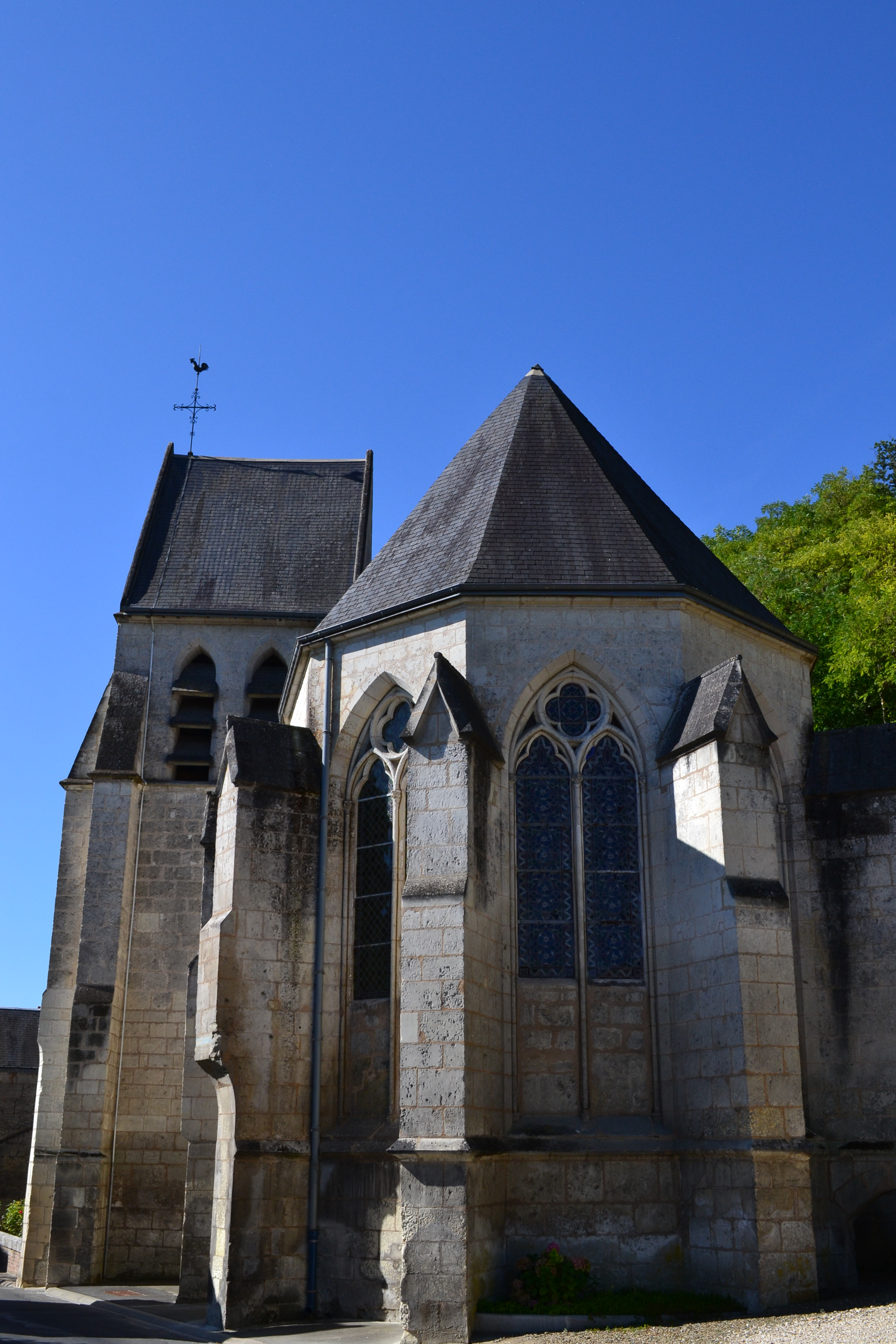
- Church of Saint-Almire

- Coat of arms
- Location of Les Roches-l'Évêque
- Location within France Location within Centre-Val de Loire
- Coordinates: 47°46′38″N 0°53′32″E
- Country: France
- Region: Centre-Val de Loire
- Department: Loir-et-Cher
- Arrondissement: Vendôme
- Canton: Montoire-sur-le-Loir
- Intercommunality: CA Territoires Vendômois

Government
  - Mayor (2020–2026): Philippe Colart
- Area^{1}: 2.4 km^{2} (0.93 sq mi)
- Elevation: 134 m (440 ft)
- Highest elevation: 134 m (440 ft)
- Lowest elevation: 66 m (217 ft)
- Population (2023): 300
  - Density: 120/km^{2} (320/sq mi)
- Time zone: UTC+01:00 (CET)
  - Summer (DST): UTC+02:00 (CEST)
- INSEE/Postal code: 41192 /41800
- ^{1} French Land Register data, which excludes lakes, ponds, glaciers > 1 km^{2} (0.386 sq mi or 247 acres) and river estuaries.

Les Roches-l'Évêque (French pronunciation: [le ʁɔʃ levɛk]) is a commune in the Loir-et-Cher department in central France.

Located in the north-west of the department, the town is part of the small agricultural region "the Valley and Coteaux du Loir", bordered to the north by a steep hill and to the south by gently sloping hillsides. It is drained by the Fargot and by two small rivers. With an area of 0.93 square miles in 2017, the town is one of the two smallest towns in the department.

Land use is marked by the importance of agricultural and natural spaces which occupy almost all of the municipal territory. A natural area of interest is present in the town: a natural area of ecological, faunistic and floristic interest (ZNIEFF). In 2010, the technico-economic orientation of agriculture in the town is the cultivation of cereals and oilseeds. Like the department which has seen a quarter of its farms disappear in ten years, the number of farms has fallen sharply, from 7 in 1988, to 5 in 2000, then to 0 in 2010.

The architectural heritage of the town includes two buildings included in the inventory of historical monuments: the chapel of Saint-Gervais des Roches-l'Évêque, classified in 1943, and the church of Saint-Almire des Roches-l'Évêque, listed in 1971.

== Location and neighboring towns ==
The commune of Les Roches-l'Évêque is located in the north-west of the department of Loir-et-Cher, in the small agricultural region of the Vallée et Coteaux du Loir. As the crow flies, it is 38.7 km from Blois, the prefecture of the department, 13.4 km from Vendôme, sub-prefecture, and 3.2 km from Montoire-sur-le-Loir, administrative center of the canton of Montoire-sur-le-Loir on which the village has been dependent since 2015.

The nearest towns are: Villavard (2.2 km), Saint-Rimay (2.8 km), Montoire-sur-le-Loir (3.2 km), Lavardin (3.7 km), Lunay (4.3 km), Houssay (4.3 km), Fontaine-les-Coteaux (5.4 km), Thoré-la-Rochette (5.7 km) and Mazangé (6.8 km).

== Landscapes and terrain ==
The landscapes of the loops of the Loir present a certain complexity: while the upstream part of the valley presents a calm and a serenity, near Les Roches, the Loir twists in tight meanders, restricted by a terrain marked by steep hillsides. Tuffeau, which has replaced the soft clay of the Perche, marks the landscape, with its white, sandy or ochre colors appearing on the cliffs weathered by the river.

The altitude of the village location ranges from 66 meters to 134 meters.

== Population ==
Historical population
Year	Pop.	±% p.a.
1968	322	—
1975	284	−1.78%
1982	256	−1.47%
1990	302	+2.09%
1999	283	−0.72%
2007	290	+0.31%
2012	284	−0.42%
2017	279	−0.35%
2023	300	+1.22%
Source: INSEE

Its inhabitants are called Rupiépiscopiens in French.

== See also ==
- Communes of the Loir-et-Cher department
