= Lunay =

Lunay may refer to:

- Lunay, Loir-et-Cher, a commune in the Loir-et-Cher department of central France
- Lunay (singer) (born 2000), Puerto Rican singer and rapper
