= Saint-Arnoult =

Saint-Arnoult, named after Saint Arnold of Soissons (Arnoul(f) in French) is an element of the name of several communes in France:

- Saint-Arnoult, Calvados, in the Calvados département
- Saint-Arnoult, Loir-et-Cher, in the Loir-et-Cher département
- Saint-Arnoult, Oise, in the Oise département
- Saint-Arnoult, Seine-Maritime, in the Seine-Maritime département
- Saint-Arnoult-des-Bois, in the Eure-et-Loir département
- Saint-Arnoult-en-Yvelines, in the Yvelines département
