= Lunay, Loir-et-Cher =

Lunay
- Commune
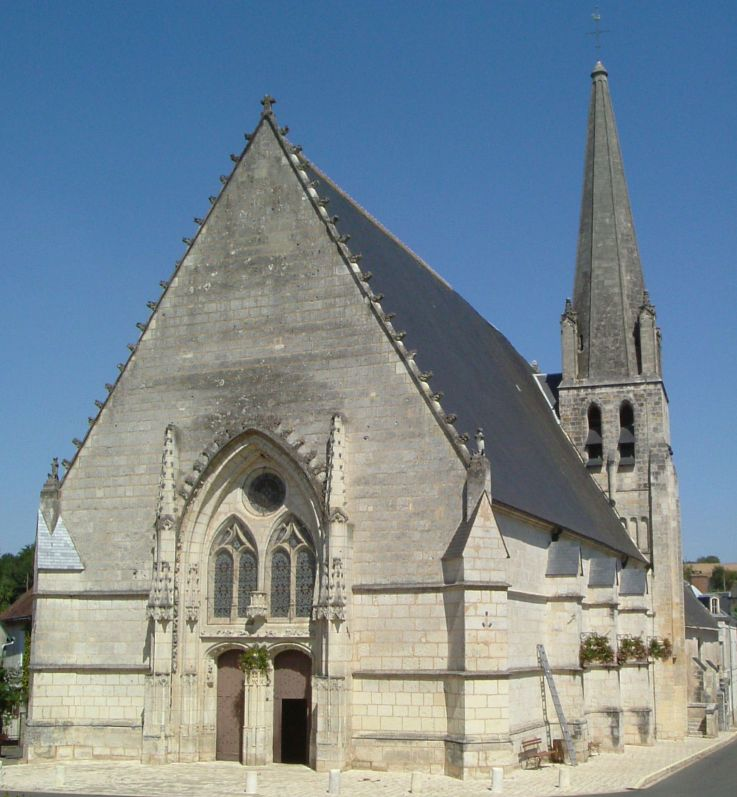
- Church of Saint-Martin

- Coat of arms
- Location of Lunay
- Location within France Location within Centre-Val de Loire
- Coordinates: 47°48′36″N 0°54′57″E
- Country: France
- Region: Centre-Val de Loire
- Department: Loir-et-Cher
- Arrondissement: Vendôme
- Canton: Montoire-sur-le-Loir
- Intercommunality: CA Territoires Vendômois

Government
  - Mayor (2020–2026): Michel Chartrain
- Area^{1}: 38.63 km^{2} (14.92 sq mi)
- Elevation: 69 m (226 ft)
- Highest elevation: 156 m (512 ft)
- Lowest elevation: 66 m (217 ft)
- Population (2023): 1,272
  - Density: 32.93/km^{2} (85.28/sq mi)
- Time zone: UTC+01:00 (CET)
  - Summer (DST): UTC+02:00 (CEST)
- INSEE/Postal code: 41120 /41360
- ^{1} French Land Register data, which excludes lakes, ponds, glaciers > 1 km^{2} (0.386 sq mi or 247 acres) and river estuaries.

Lunay (French pronunciation: [lynɛ]) is a commune in the Loir-et-Cher department of central France.

== Geography ==
Lunay is located 15 km (9.3 mi) west of the city of Vendôme, in the northwest of the département and 180 km southwest of Paris. The river Loir flows along the east and south edges of the commune for 8 km.

Lunay is bordered by Thoré-la-Rochette, Mazangé, Fortan, Savigny-sur-Braye, Fontaine-les-Coteaux, Montoire-sur-le-Loir, Les Roches-l'Évêque, and Saint-Rimay.

== Population ==
Historical population
Year	Pop.	±% p.a.
1968	1,011	—
1975	1,007	−0.06%
1982	1,207	+2.62%
1990	1,213	+0.06%
1999	1,293	+0.71%
2007	1,336	+0.41%
2012	1,301	−0.53%
2017	1,267	−0.53%
2023	1,272	+0.07%
Source: INSEE

== See also ==
- Communes of the Loir-et-Cher department
