= Ternay =

Ternay may refer to the following places in France:

- Ternay, Loir-et-Cher, a commune in the Loir-et-Cher department
- Ternay, Rhône, a commune in the Rhône department
- Ternay, Vienne, a commune in the Vienne department
- Ternay River, a river in France
