= Villeporcher =

- Commune
- Coat of arms
- Location of Villeporcher
- Location within France Location within Centre-Val de Loire
- Coordinates: 47°38′27″N 0°59′39″E
- Country: France
- Region: Centre-Val de Loire
- Department: Loir-et-Cher
- Arrondissement: Vendôme
- Canton: Montoire-sur-le-Loir
- Intercommunality: CA Territoires Vendômois

Government
  - Mayor (2020–2026): Philippe Bouchet
- Area^{1}: 12.1 km^{2} (4.7 sq mi)
- Elevation: 120 m (390 ft)
- Highest elevation: 137 m (449 ft)
- Lowest elevation: 115 m (377 ft)
- Population (2023): 146
  - Density: 12.1/km^{2} (31.3/sq mi)
- Time zone: UTC+01:00 (CET)
  - Summer (DST): UTC+02:00 (CEST)
- INSEE/Postal code: 41286 /41310
- ^{1} French Land Register data, which excludes lakes, ponds, glaciers > 1 km^{2} (0.386 sq mi or 247 acres) and river estuaries.

Villeporcher (French pronunciation: [vilpɔʁʃe]) is a commune in the Loir-et-Cher department in central France.

== Population ==
Historical population
Year	Pop.	±% p.a.
1968	210	—
1975	149	−4.78%
1982	151	+0.19%
1990	130	−1.85%
1999	136	+0.50%
2007	147	+0.98%
2012	149	+0.27%
2017	153	+0.53%
2023	146	−0.78%
Source: INSEE

== See also ==
- Communes of the Loir-et-Cher department
