= Marcilly-en-Beauce =

- Commune
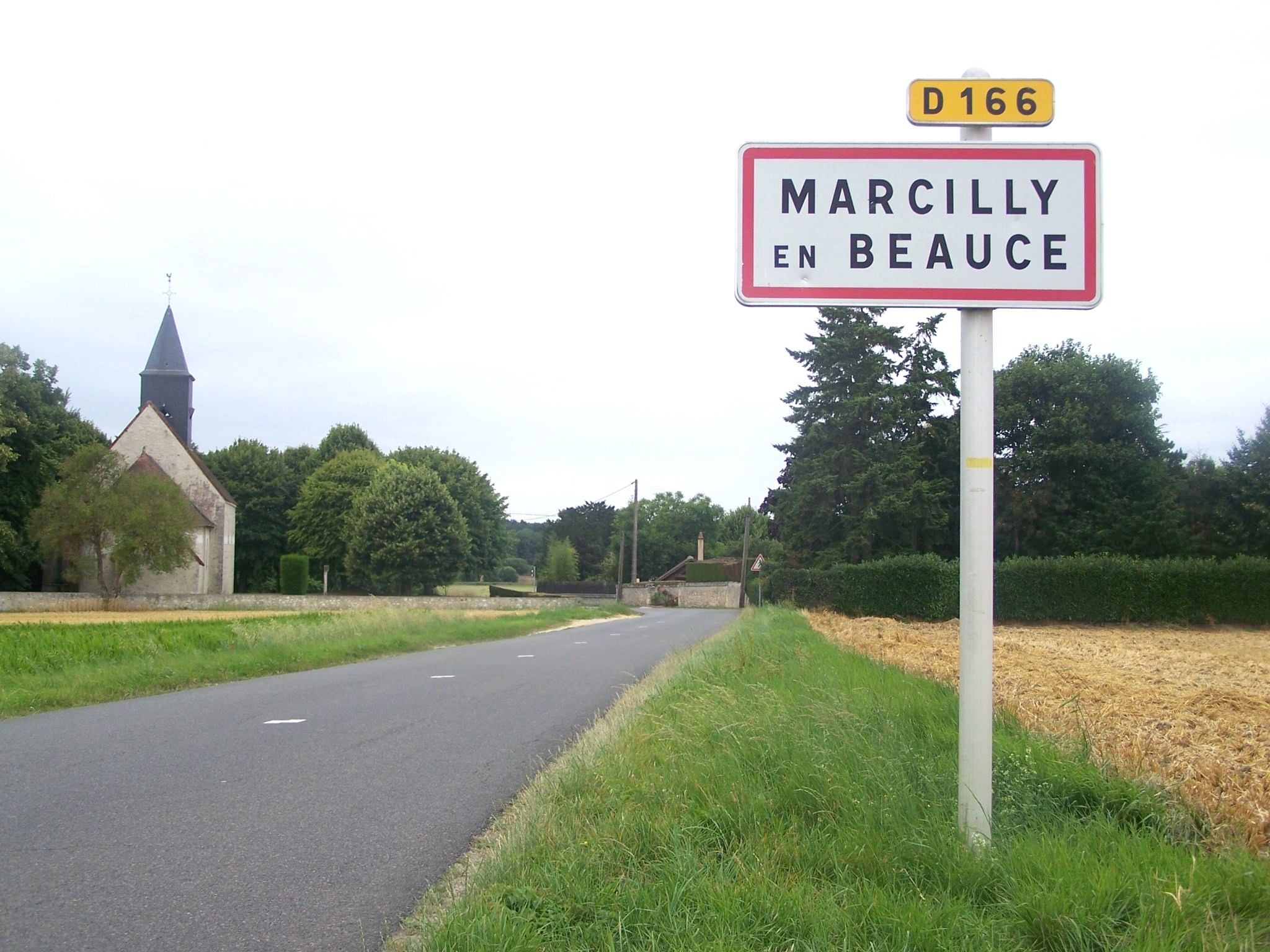

- Coat of arms
- Location of Marcilly-en-Beauce
- Location within France Location within Centre-Val de Loire
- Coordinates: 47°45′52″N 1°00′09″E
- Country: France
- Region: Centre-Val de Loire
- Department: Loir-et-Cher
- Arrondissement: Vendôme
- Canton: Montoire-sur-le-Loir
- Intercommunality: CA Territoires Vendômois

Government
  - Mayor (2020–2026): Marie-Christine Sauvé
- Area^{1}: 6.39 km^{2} (2.47 sq mi)
- Elevation: 101 m (331 ft)
- Highest elevation: 132 m (433 ft)
- Lowest elevation: 80 m (260 ft)
- Population (2023): 319
  - Density: 49.9/km^{2} (129/sq mi)
- Time zone: UTC+01:00 (CET)
  - Summer (DST): UTC+02:00 (CEST)
- INSEE/Postal code: 41124 /41100
- ^{1} French Land Register data, which excludes lakes, ponds, glaciers > 1 km^{2} (0.386 sq mi or 247 acres) and river estuaries.

Marcilly-en-Beauce (French pronunciation: [maʁsiji ɑ̃ bos], literally Marcilly in Beauce) is a commune in the Loir-et-Cher department of central France.

== Population ==
Historical population
Year	Pop.	±% p.a.
1968	169	—
1975	198	+2.29%
1982	237	+2.60%
1990	215	−1.21%
1999	232	+0.85%
2007	361	+5.68%
2012	358	−0.17%
2017	348	−0.57%
2023	319	−1.44%
Source: INSEE

== See also ==
- Communes of the Loir-et-Cher department
