= Villiersfaux =

- Commune
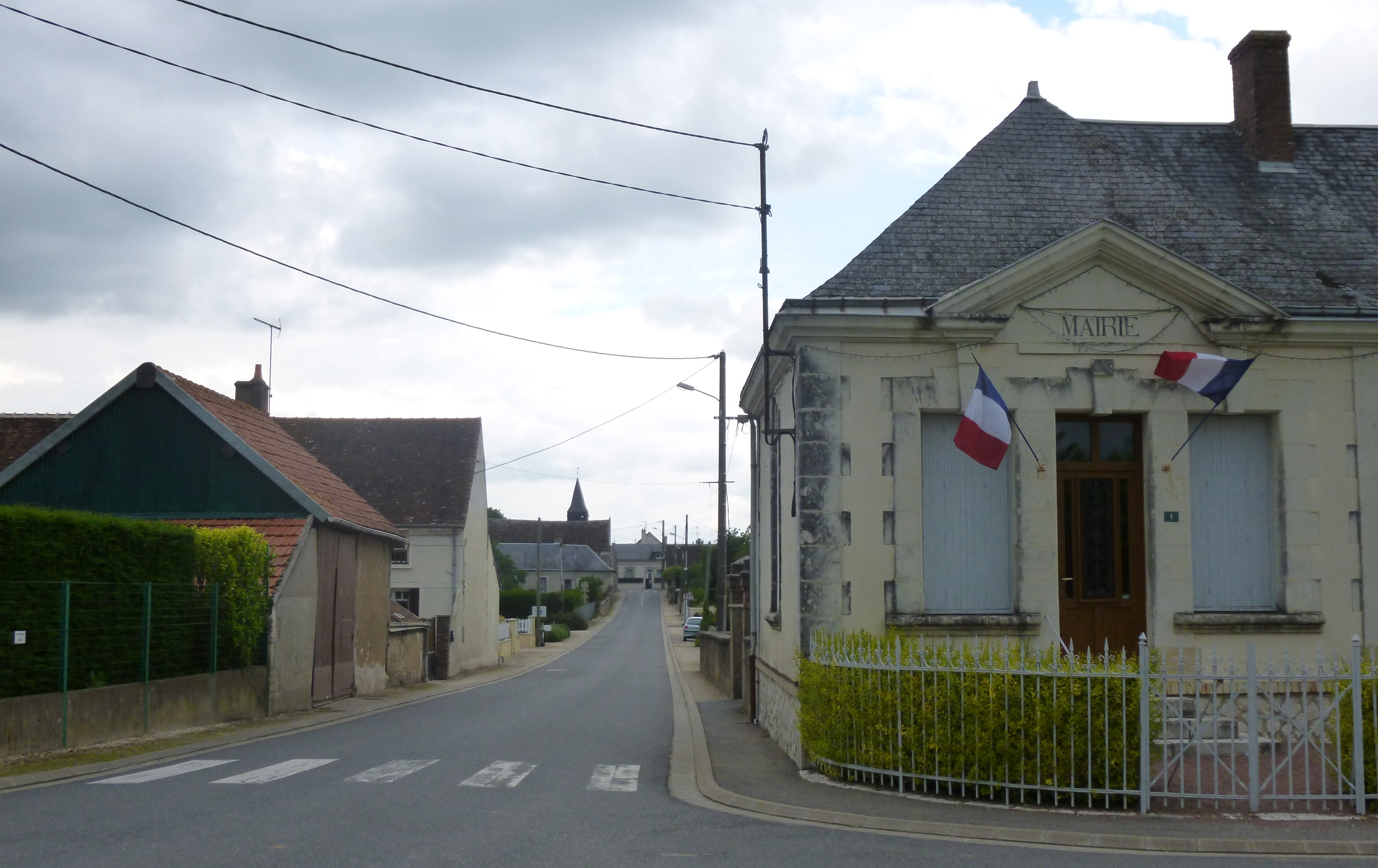
- Town hall

- Coat of arms
- Location of Villiersfaux
- Location within France Location within Centre-Val de Loire
- Coordinates: 47°45′01″N 0°59′20″E
- Country: France
- Region: Centre-Val de Loire
- Department: Loir-et-Cher
- Arrondissement: Vendôme
- Canton: Montoire-sur-le-Loir
- Intercommunality: CA Territoires Vendômois

Government
  - Mayor (2020–2026): Sylvie Norguet
- Area^{1}: 7.22 km^{2} (2.79 sq mi)
- Elevation: 124 m (407 ft)
- Highest elevation: 134 m (440 ft)
- Lowest elevation: 85 m (279 ft)
- Population (2023): 246
  - Density: 34.1/km^{2} (88.2/sq mi)
- Time zone: UTC+01:00 (CET)
  - Summer (DST): UTC+02:00 (CEST)
- INSEE/Postal code: 41293 /41100
- ^{1} French Land Register data, which excludes lakes, ponds, glaciers > 1 km^{2} (0.386 sq mi or 247 acres) and river estuaries.

Villiersfaux (French pronunciation: [viljefo]) is a commune in the Loir-et-Cher department in central France.

== Population ==
Historical population
| Year | Pop. | ±% p.a. |
|---|---|---|
| 1968 | 176 | — |
| 1975 | 166 | −0.83% |
| 1982 | 184 | +1.48% |
| 1990 | 215 | +1.97% |
| 1999 | 224 | +0.46% |
| 2007 | 252 | +1.48% |
| 2012 | 256 | +0.32% |
| 2017 | 255 | −0.08% |
| 2023 | 246 | −0.60% |
Source: INSEE

== See also ==
- Communes of the Loir-et-Cher department
