= Saint-Gourgon =

- Commune
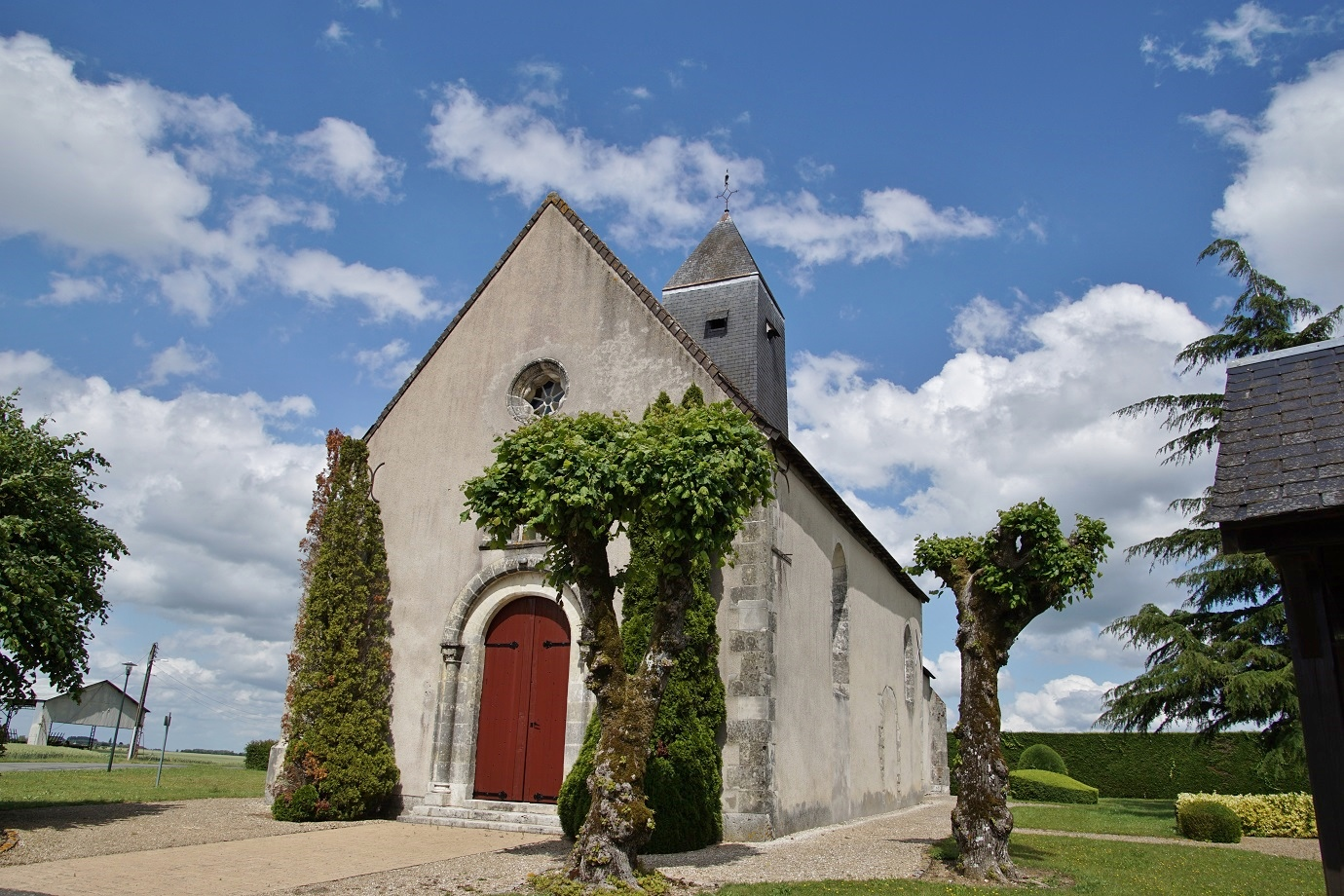
- Church of Saint Gourgon in Saint-Gourgon

- Coat of arms
- Location of Saint-Gourgon
- Location within France Location within Centre-Val de Loire
- Coordinates: 47°39′42″N 1°01′05″E
- Country: France
- Region: Centre-Val de Loire
- Department: Loir-et-Cher
- Arrondissement: Vendôme
- Canton: Montoire-sur-le-Loir
- Intercommunality: CA Territoires Vendômois

Government
  - Mayor (2020–2026): Christine Toreau
- Area^{1}: 10.15 km^{2} (3.92 sq mi)
- Elevation: 130 m (430 ft)
- Highest elevation: 129 m (423 ft)
- Lowest elevation: 112 m (367 ft)
- Population (2023): 96
  - Density: 9.5/km^{2} (24/sq mi)
- Time zone: UTC+01:00 (CET)
  - Summer (DST): UTC+02:00 (CEST)
- INSEE/Postal code: 41213 /41310
- ^{1} French Land Register data, which excludes lakes, ponds, glaciers > 1 km^{2} (0.386 sq mi or 247 acres) and river estuaries.

Saint-Gourgon (French pronunciation: [sɛ̃ ɡuʁɡɔ̃]) is a commune in the Loir-et-Cher department of central France.

== Population ==
Historical population
Year	Pop.	±% p.a.
1968	176	—
1975	158	−1.53%
1982	145	−1.22%
1990	120	−2.34%
1999	116	−0.38%
2007	122	+0.63%
2012	122	+0.00%
2017	113	−1.52%
2023	96	−2.68%
Source: INSEE

== See also ==
- Communes of the Loir-et-Cher department
