= Ambloy =

- Commune
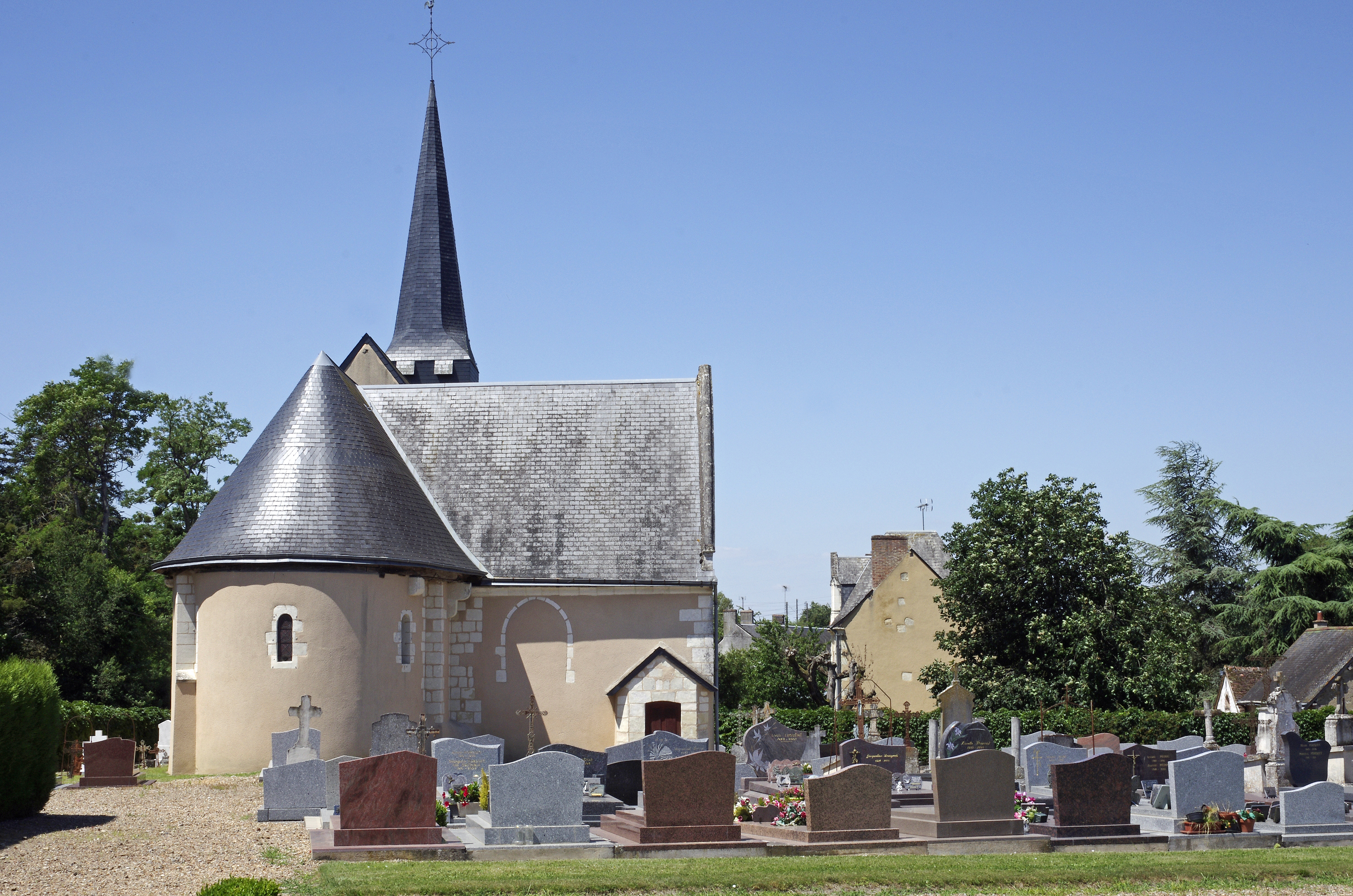
- Church of Saint Martin in Ambloy

- Coat of arms
- Location of Ambloy
- Location within France Location within Centre-Val de Loire
- Coordinates: 47°42′47″N 0°58′05″E
- Country: France
- Region: Centre-Val de Loire
- Department: Loir-et-Cher
- Arrondissement: Vendôme
- Canton: Montoire-sur-le-Loir
- Intercommunality: CA Territoires Vendômois

Government
  - Mayor (2020–2026): Lydie Boulay
- Area^{1}: 13.16 km^{2} (5.08 sq mi)
- Elevation: 125 m (410 ft)
- Highest elevation: 134 m (440 ft)
- Lowest elevation: 99 m (325 ft)
- Population (2023): 187
  - Density: 14.2/km^{2} (36.8/sq mi)
- Time zone: UTC+01:00 (CET)
  - Summer (DST): UTC+02:00 (CEST)
- INSEE/Postal code: 41001 /41310
- ^{1} French Land Register data, which excludes lakes, ponds, glaciers > 1 km^{2} (0.386 sq mi or 247 acres) and river estuaries.

Ambloy (French pronunciation: [ɑ̃blwa]) is a commune in the Loir-et-Cher department in central France.

== Population ==
Historical population
Year	Pop.	±% p.a.
1968	212	—
1975	185	−1.93%
1982	182	−0.23%
1990	166	−1.14%
1999	155	−0.76%
2007	164	+0.71%
2012	194	+3.42%
2017	185	−0.95%
2023	187	+0.18%
Source: INSEE

== See also ==
- Communes of the Loir-et-Cher department
