= Rocé =

- Commune
- Coat of arms
- Location of Rocé
- Location within France Location within Centre-Val de Loire
- Coordinates: 47°48′29″N 1°08′54″E
- Country: France
- Region: Centre-Val de Loire
- Department: Loir-et-Cher
- Arrondissement: Vendôme
- Canton: Montoire-sur-le-Loir
- Intercommunality: CA Territoires Vendômois

Government
  - Mayor (2020–2026): Régis Chevallier
- Area^{1}: 10.27 km^{2} (3.97 sq mi)
- Elevation: 128 m (420 ft)
- Highest elevation: 131 m (430 ft)
- Lowest elevation: 87 m (285 ft)
- Population (2023): 218
  - Density: 21.2/km^{2} (55.0/sq mi)
- Time zone: UTC+01:00 (CET)
  - Summer (DST): UTC+02:00 (CEST)
- INSEE/Postal code: 41190 /41100
- ^{1} French Land Register data, which excludes lakes, ponds, glaciers > 1 km^{2} (0.386 sq mi or 247 acres) and river estuaries.

Rocé (French pronunciation: [ʁɔse]) is a commune in the Loir-et-Cher department in central France.

== Population ==
Historical population
Year	Pop.	±% p.a.
1968	142	—
1975	153	+1.07%
1982	158	+0.46%
1990	165	+0.54%
1999	197	+1.99%
2007	183	−0.92%
2012	206	+2.40%
2017	218	+1.14%
2023	218	+0.00%
Source: INSEE

== See also ==
- Communes of the Loir-et-Cher department
