= Tourailles =

- Commune
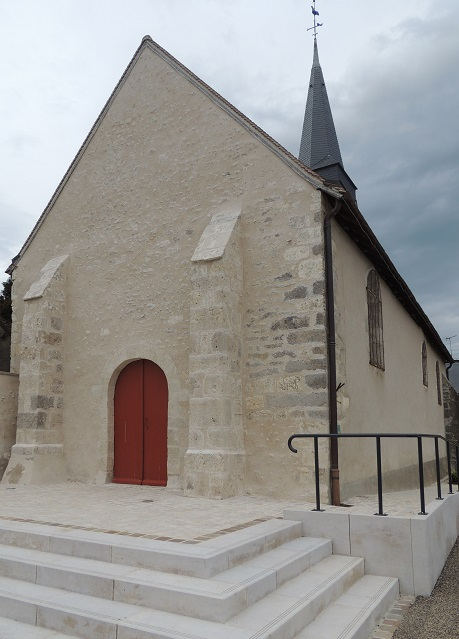

- Coat of arms
- Location of Tourailles
- Location within France Location within Centre-Val de Loire
- Coordinates: 47°41′09″N 1°09′34″E
- Country: France
- Region: Centre-Val de Loire
- Department: Loir-et-Cher
- Arrondissement: Vendôme
- Canton: Montoire-sur-le-Loir
- Intercommunality: CA Territoires Vendômois

Government
  - Mayor (2020–2026): Michel Randuineau
- Area^{1}: 7.46 km^{2} (2.88 sq mi)
- Elevation: 122 m (400 ft)
- Highest elevation: 134 m (440 ft)
- Lowest elevation: 117 m (384 ft)
- Population (2023): 129
  - Density: 17.3/km^{2} (44.8/sq mi)
- Time zone: UTC+01:00 (CET)
  - Summer (DST): UTC+02:00 (CEST)
- INSEE/Postal code: 41261 /41190
- ^{1} French Land Register data, which excludes lakes, ponds, glaciers > 1 km^{2} (0.386 sq mi or 247 acres) and river estuaries.

Tourailles (French pronunciation: [tuʁaj]) is a commune of the Loir-et-Cher department in central France.

== Population ==
Historical population
Year	Pop.	±% p.a.
1968	171	—
1975	158	−1.12%
1982	135	−2.22%
1990	149	+1.24%
1999	133	−1.25%
2007	136	+0.28%
2012	129	−1.05%
2017	134	+0.76%
2023	129	−0.63%
Source: INSEE

== See also ==
- Communes of the Loir-et-Cher department
