= Nourray =

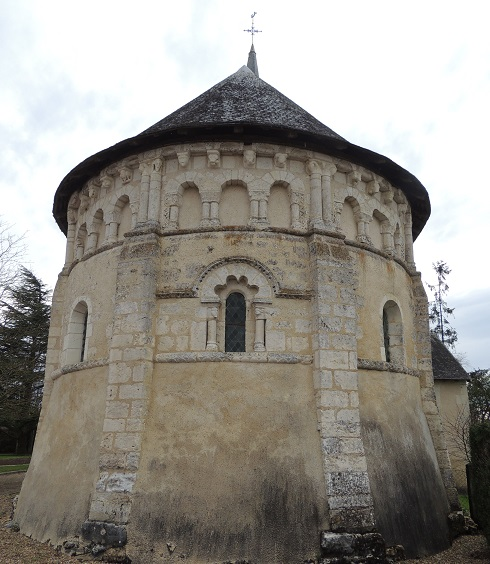

- Coat of arms
- Location of Nourray
- Location within France Location within Centre-Val de Loire
- Coordinates: 47°43′06″N 1°03′34″E
- Country: France
- Region: Centre-Val de Loire
- Department: Loir-et-Cher
- Arrondissement: Vendôme
- Canton: Montoire-sur-le-Loir
- Intercommunality: CA Territoires Vendômois

Government
  - Mayor (2020–2026): Dominique Dhuy
- Area^{1}: 12.17 km^{2} (4.70 sq mi)
- Elevation: 115 m (377 ft)
- Highest elevation: 133 m (436 ft)
- Lowest elevation: 103 m (338 ft)
- Population (2023): 127
  - Density: 10.4/km^{2} (27.0/sq mi)
- Time zone: UTC+01:00 (CET)
  - Summer (DST): UTC+02:00 (CEST)
- INSEE/Postal code: 41163 /41310
- ^{1} French Land Register data, which excludes lakes, ponds, glaciers > 1 km^{2} (0.386 sq mi or 247 acres) and river estuaries.

Nourray (French pronunciation: [nuʁɛ]) is a commune in the Loir-et-Cher department of central France. The commune is located in the region of Centre-Val de Loire.

== Population ==
Historical population
Year	Pop.	±% p.a.
1968	138	—
1975	112	−2.94%
1982	135	+2.70%
1990	140	+0.46%
1999	122	−1.52%
2007	111	−1.17%
2012	118	+1.23%
2017	109	−1.57%
2023	127	+2.58%
Source: INSEE

== See also ==
- Communes of the Loir-et-Cher department
