= Communauté d'agglomération Territoires Vendômois =

Territoires Vendômois
- Communauté d'agglomération
- Interactive map of Territoires Vendômois
- Coordinates: 47°46′N 00°58′E
- Country: France
- Region: Centre-Val de Loire
- Department: Loir-et-Cher
- No. of communes: {{{nbcomm}}}
- Established: 2017
- Area: 1,039.6 km^{2} (401.4 sq mi)
- Population (2019): 52,836
  - Density: 50.823/km^{2} (131.63/sq mi)
- Website: www.territoiresvendomois.fr

Communauté d'agglomération Territoires Vendômois is the communauté d'agglomération, an intercommunal structure, centred on the town of Vendôme. It is located in the Loir-et-Cher department, in the Centre-Val de Loire region, central France. Created in 2017, its seat is in Vendôme. Its area is 1,039.6 km^{2}. Its population was 52,836 in 2019, of which 15,856 in Vendôme proper.

== Composition ==
The communauté d'agglomération consists of the following 65 communes:

1. Ambloy
2. Areines
3. Artins
4. Authon
5. Azé
6. Bonneveau
7. Cellé
8. Coulommiers-la-Tour
9. Crucheray
10. Danzé
11. Épuisay
12. Les Essarts
13. Faye
14. Fontaine-les-Coteaux
15. Fortan
16. Gombergean
17. Les Hayes
18. Houssay
19. Huisseau-en-Beauce
20. Lancé
21. Lavardin
22. Lunay
23. Marcilly-en-Beauce
24. Mazangé
25. Meslay
26. Montoire-sur-le-Loir
27. Montrouveau
28. Naveil
29. Nourray
30. Périgny
31. Pray
32. Prunay-Cassereau
33. Rahart
34. Rocé
35. Les Roches-l'Évêque
36. Saint-Amand-Longpré
37. Saint-Arnoult
38. Sainte-Anne
39. Saint-Firmin-des-Prés
40. Saint-Gourgon
41. Saint-Jacques-des-Guérets
42. Saint-Martin-des-Bois
43. Saint-Ouen
44. Saint-Rimay
45. Sasnières
46. Savigny-sur-Braye
47. Selommes
48. Sougé
49. Ternay
50. Thoré-la-Rochette
51. Tourailles
52. Troo
53. Vallée-de-Ronsard
54. Vendôme
55. La Ville-aux-Clercs
56. Villavard
57. Villechauve
58. Villedieu-le-Château
59. Villemardy
60. Villeporcher
61. Villerable
62. Villeromain
63. Villetrun
64. Villiersfaux
65. Villiers-sur-Loir
