= Pray, Loir-et-Cher =

Pray
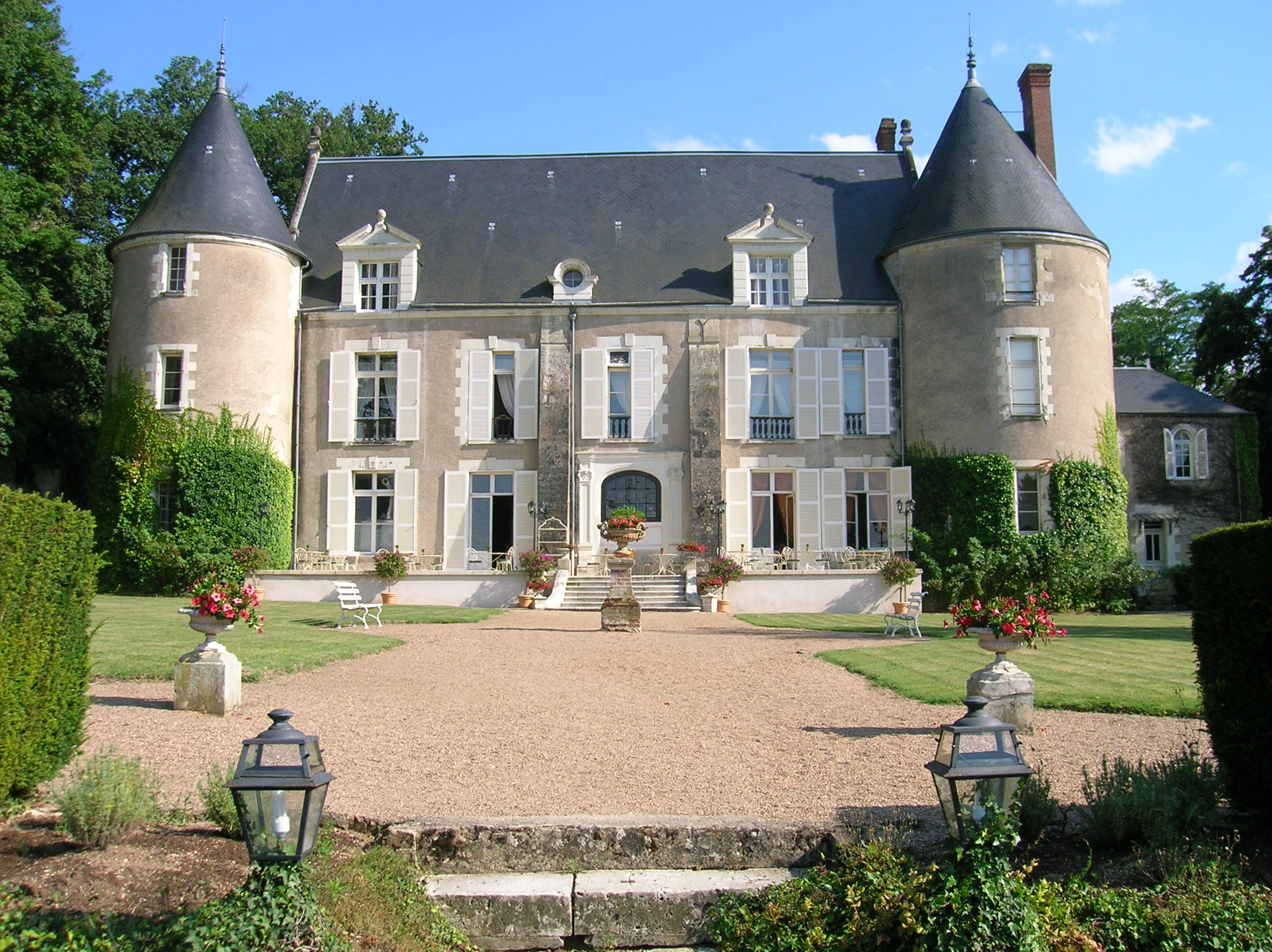
- Château of Pray

- Coat of arms
- Location of Pray
- Location within France Location within Centre-Val de Loire
- Coordinates: 47°40′37″N 1°07′04″E
- Country: France
- Region: Centre-Val de Loire
- Department: Loir-et-Cher
- Arrondissement: Vendôme
- Canton: Montoire-sur-le-Loir
- Intercommunality: CA Territoires Vendômois

Government
  - Mayor (2020–2026): Érick Gougé
- Area^{1}: 10.48 km^{2} (4.05 sq mi)
- Elevation: 129 m (423 ft)
- Highest elevation: 132 m (433 ft)
- Lowest elevation: 123 m (404 ft)
- Population (2023): 278
  - Density: 26.5/km^{2} (68.7/sq mi)
- Time zone: UTC+01:00 (CET)
  - Summer (DST): UTC+02:00 (CEST)
- INSEE/Postal code: 41182 /41190
- ^{1} French Land Register data, which excludes lakes, ponds, glaciers > 1 km^{2} (0.386 sq mi or 247 acres) and river estuaries.

Pray (French pronunciation: [pʁɛ]) is a commune in the Loir-et-Cher department of central France.

== Population ==
Historical population
Year	Pop.	±% p.a.
1968	219	—
1975	215	−0.26%
1982	218	+0.20%
1990	244	+1.42%
1999	262	+0.79%
2007	281	+0.88%
2012	302	+1.45%
2017	292	−0.67%
2023	278	−0.82%
Source: INSEE

== See also ==
- Communes of the Loir-et-Cher department
