= Canton of Montoire-sur-le-Loir =

Coordinates: 47.75°N 0.86°E

The canton of Montoire-sur-le-Loir is an administrative division of the Loir-et-Cher department, central France. Its borders were modified at the French canton reorganisation which came into effect in March 2015. Its seat is in Montoire-sur-le-Loir.

It consists of the following communes:

1. Ambloy
2. Artins
3. Authon
4. Coulommiers-la-Tour
5. Crucheray
6. Les Essarts
7. Faye
8. Gombergean
9. Les Hayes
10. Houssay
11. Huisseau-en-Beauce
12. Lancé
13. Lavardin
14. Lunay
15. Marcilly-en-Beauce
16. Montoire-sur-le-Loir
17. Montrouveau
18. Naveil
19. Nourray
20. Périgny
21. Pray
22. Prunay-Cassereau
23. Rocé
24. Les Roches-l'Évêque
25. Saint-Amand-Longpré
26. Saint-Arnoult
27. Saint-Gourgon
28. Saint-Jacques-des-Guérets
29. Saint-Martin-des-Bois
30. Saint-Rimay
31. Sasnières
32. Selommes
33. Ternay
34. Thoré-la-Rochette
35. Tourailles
36. Troo
37. Vallée-de-Ronsard
38. Villavard
39. Villechauve
40. Villedieu-le-Château
41. Villemardy
42. Villeporcher
43. Villerable
44. Villeromain
45. Villetrun
46. Villiersfaux
