= Villemardy =

- Commune
- Coat of arms
- Location of Villemardy
- Location within France Location within Centre-Val de Loire
- Coordinates: 47°44′03″N 1°11′29″E
- Country: France
- Region: Centre-Val de Loire
- Department: Loir-et-Cher
- Arrondissement: Vendôme
- Canton: Montoire-sur-le-Loir
- Intercommunality: CA Territoires Vendômois

Government
  - Mayor (2020–2026): Gilles Leguereau
- Area^{1}: 12.17 km^{2} (4.70 sq mi)
- Elevation: 126 m (413 ft)
- Highest elevation: 133 m (436 ft)
- Lowest elevation: 118 m (387 ft)
- Population (2023): 264
  - Density: 21.7/km^{2} (56.2/sq mi)
- Time zone: UTC+01:00 (CET)
  - Summer (DST): UTC+02:00 (CEST)
- INSEE/Postal code: 41283 /41100
- ^{1} French Land Register data, which excludes lakes, ponds, glaciers > 1 km^{2} (0.386 sq mi or 247 acres) and river estuaries.

Villemardy (French pronunciation: [vilmaʁdi]) is a commune in the Loir-et-Cher department in central France.

== Population ==
Historical population
Year	Pop.	±% p.a.
1968	256	—
1975	242	−0.80%
1982	233	−0.54%
1990	241	+0.42%
1999	217	−1.16%
2007	269	+2.72%
2012	277	+0.59%
2017	277	+0.00%
2023	264	−0.80%
Source: INSEE

== See also ==
- Communes of the Loir-et-Cher department
