= Villedieu-le-Château =

- Commune
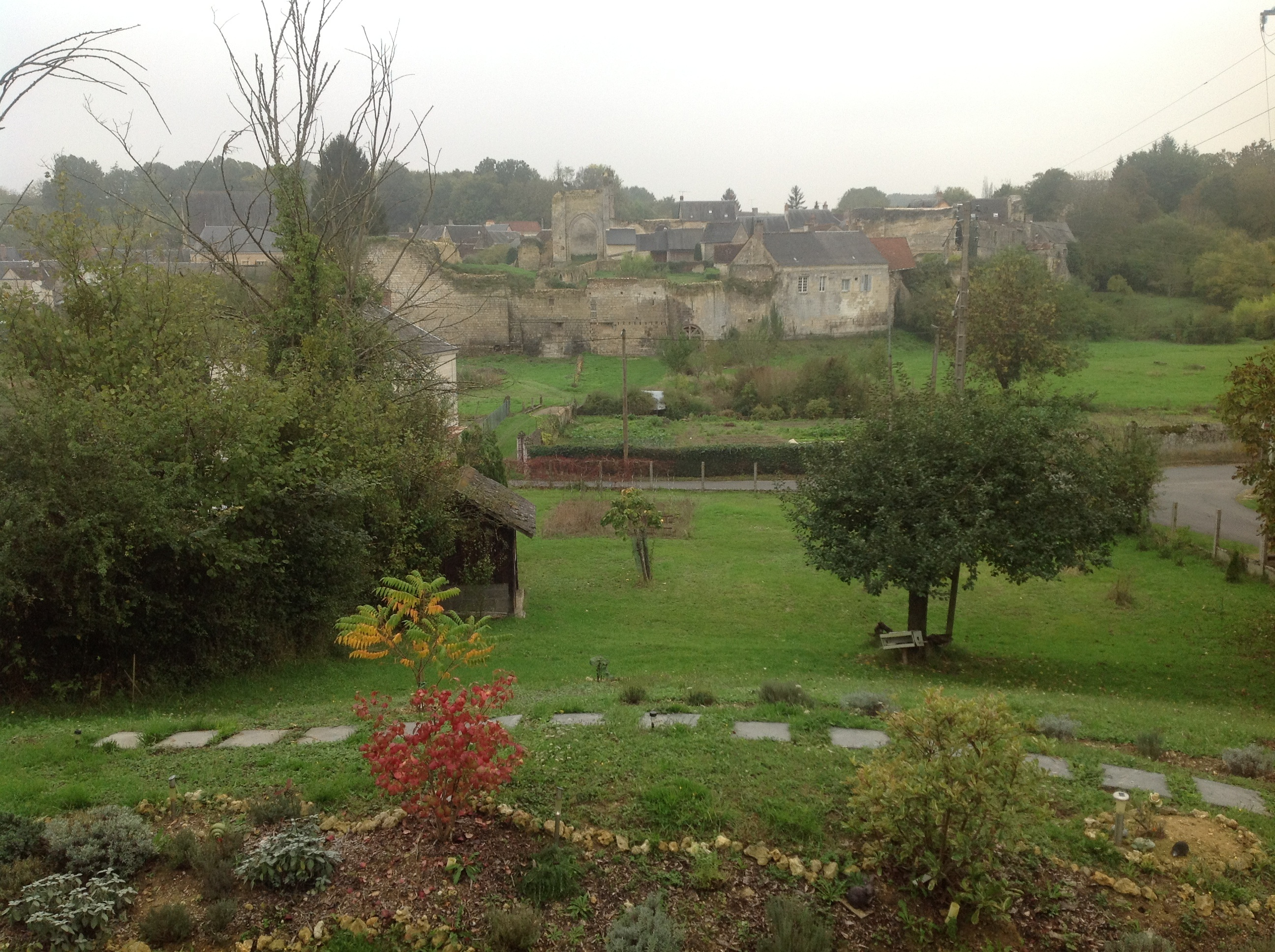

- Coat of arms
- Location of Villedieu-le-Château
- Location within France Location within Centre-Val de Loire
- Coordinates: 47°43′15″N 0°38′56″E
- Country: France
- Region: Centre-Val de Loire
- Department: Loir-et-Cher
- Arrondissement: Vendôme
- Canton: Montoire-sur-le-Loir
- Intercommunality: CA Territoires Vendômois

Government
  - Mayor (2020–2026): Alain Verite
- Area^{1}: 29.65 km^{2} (11.45 sq mi)
- Elevation: 125 m (410 ft)
- Highest elevation: 133 m (436 ft)
- Lowest elevation: 60 m (200 ft)
- Population (2023): 381
  - Density: 12.8/km^{2} (33.3/sq mi)
- Time zone: UTC+01:00 (CET)
  - Summer (DST): UTC+02:00 (CEST)
- INSEE/Postal code: 41279 /41800
- ^{1} French Land Register data, which excludes lakes, ponds, glaciers > 1 km^{2} (0.386 sq mi or 247 acres) and river estuaries.

Villedieu-le-Château (French pronunciation: [vildjø lə ʃɑto]) is a commune in the Loir-et-Cher department in central France.

== Geography ==
Villedieu-le-Château borders the commune of La Chartre-sur-le-Loir (Sarthe) and marks the most eastern extension of the department and of the Bas-Vendômois. The Niclos stream traverses the commune.

== Population ==
Historical population
Year	Pop.	±% p.a.
1968	719	—
1975	605	−2.44%
1982	553	−1.28%
1990	462	−2.22%
1999	420	−1.05%
2007	409	−0.33%
2012	409	+0.00%
2017	414	+0.24%
2023	381	−1.37%
Source: INSEE

== Sights ==
The village is dominated by the medieval fortified enceinte of a ruined medieval monastic foundation established by the Abbey of the Trinity at Vendôme. The cult of Our Lady of Pity was transferred to the 15th-century parish church, which possesses early painting on wood, and which is the site of an annual pilgrimage in September.

== See also ==
- Communes of the Loir-et-Cher department
