= Villerable =

- Commune
- Coat of arms
- Location of Villerable
- Location within France Location within Centre-Val de Loire
- Coordinates: 47°45′33″N 1°01′53″E
- Country: France
- Region: Centre-Val de Loire
- Department: Loir-et-Cher
- Arrondissement: Vendôme
- Canton: Montoire-sur-le-Loir
- Intercommunality: CA Territoires Vendômois

Government
  - Mayor (2023–2026): Marie-Pierre Laurenceau
- Area^{1}: 16.81 km^{2} (6.49 sq mi)
- Elevation: 130 m (430 ft)
- Highest elevation: 138 m (453 ft)
- Lowest elevation: 87 m (285 ft)
- Population (2023): 485
  - Density: 28.9/km^{2} (74.7/sq mi)
- Time zone: UTC+01:00 (CET)
  - Summer (DST): UTC+02:00 (CEST)
- INSEE/Postal code: 41287 /41100
- ^{1} French Land Register data, which excludes lakes, ponds, glaciers > 1 km^{2} (0.386 sq mi or 247 acres) and river estuaries.

Villerable (French pronunciation: [vilʁabl]) is a commune in the Loir-et-Cher department in central France.

== Population ==
Historical population
Year	Pop.	±% p.a.
1968	321	—
1975	333	+0.53%
1982	433	+3.82%
1990	499	+1.79%
1999	501	+0.04%
2007	495	−0.15%
2012	550	+2.13%
2017	520	−1.12%
2023	485	−1.15%
Source: INSEE

== See also ==
- Communes of the Loir-et-Cher department
