= Crucheray =

- Commune
- Coat of arms
- Location of Crucheray
- Location within France Location within Centre-Val de Loire
- Coordinates: 47°43′43″N 1°05′21″E
- Country: France
- Region: Centre-Val de Loire
- Department: Loir-et-Cher
- Arrondissement: Vendôme
- Canton: Montoire-sur-le-Loir
- Intercommunality: CA Territoires Vendômois

Government
  - Mayor (2020–2026): Bruno Barbier
- Area^{1}: 25.43 km^{2} (9.82 sq mi)
- Elevation: 130 m (430 ft)
- Highest elevation: 132 m (433 ft)
- Lowest elevation: 93 m (305 ft)
- Population (2023): 427
  - Density: 16.8/km^{2} (43.5/sq mi)
- Time zone: UTC+01:00 (CET)
  - Summer (DST): UTC+02:00 (CEST)
- INSEE/Postal code: 41072 /41100
- ^{1} French Land Register data, which excludes lakes, ponds, glaciers > 1 km^{2} (0.386 sq mi or 247 acres) and river estuaries.

Crucheray is a commune located in the Loir-et-Cher department in central France. It is part of the Vendôme arrondissement and the Montoire-sur-le-Loir canton.

== Population ==
Historical population
Year	Pop.	±% p.a.
1968	431	—
1975	449	+0.59%
1982	377	−2.47%
1990	366	−0.37%
1999	373	+0.21%
2007	387	+0.46%
2012	408	+1.06%
2017	381	−1.36%
2023	427	+1.92%
Source: INSEE

== See also ==
- Communes of the Loir-et-Cher department
