= Les Essarts, Loir-et-Cher =

Les Essarts
- Commune
- Coat of arms
- Location of Les Essarts
- Location within France Location within Centre-Val de Loire
- Coordinates: 47°44′03″N 0°43′07″E
- Country: France
- Region: Centre-Val de Loire
- Department: Loir-et-Cher
- Arrondissement: Vendôme
- Canton: Montoire-sur-le-Loir
- Intercommunality: CA Territoires Vendômois

Government
  - Mayor (2020–2026): Gilles Souriau
- Area^{1}: 4.38 km^{2} (1.69 sq mi)
- Elevation: 186 m (610 ft)
- Highest elevation: 139 m (456 ft)
- Lowest elevation: 75 m (246 ft)
- Population (2023): 108
  - Density: 24.7/km^{2} (63.9/sq mi)
- Time zone: UTC+01:00 (CET)
  - Summer (DST): UTC+02:00 (CEST)
- INSEE/Postal code: 41079 /41800
- ^{1} French Land Register data, which excludes lakes, ponds, glaciers > 1 km^{2} (0.386 sq mi or 247 acres) and river estuaries.

Les Essarts (French pronunciation: [lez‿esaʁ]) is a commune in the Loir-et-Cher department of central France.

== Population ==
Historical population
Year	Pop.	±% p.a.
1968	110	—
1975	105	−0.66%
1982	110	+0.67%
1990	92	−2.21%
1999	102	+1.15%
2007	101	−0.12%
2012	106	+0.97%
2017	108	+0.37%
2023	108	+0.00%
Source: INSEE

== Sights ==
There is a small church dedicated to St. George.

== See also ==
- Communes of the Loir-et-Cher department
