= Coulommiers-la-Tour =

- Commune
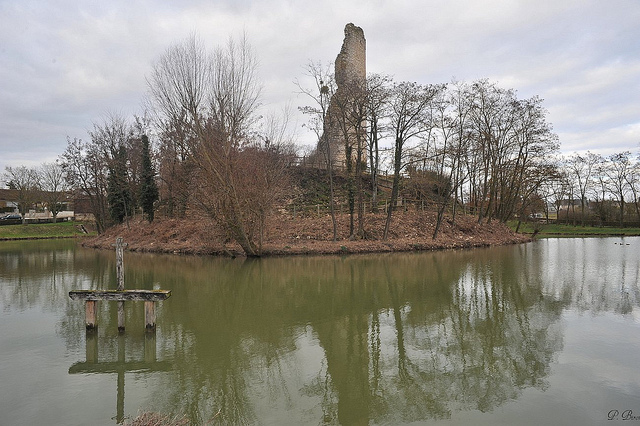
- Ruins of the tower

- Coat of arms
- Location of Coulommiers-la-Tour
- Location within France Location within Centre-Val de Loire
- Coordinates: 47°47′02″N 1°08′39″E
- Country: France
- Region: Centre-Val de Loire
- Department: Loir-et-Cher
- Arrondissement: Vendôme
- Canton: Montoire-sur-le-Loir
- Intercommunality: CA Territoires Vendômois

Government
  - Mayor (2020–2026): Alain Souvrain
- Area^{1}: 12.12 km^{2} (4.68 sq mi)
- Elevation: 118 m (387 ft)
- Highest elevation: 131 m (430 ft)
- Lowest elevation: 87 m (285 ft)
- Population (2023): 575
  - Density: 47.4/km^{2} (123/sq mi)
- Time zone: UTC+01:00 (CET)
  - Summer (DST): UTC+02:00 (CEST)
- INSEE/Postal code: 41065 /41100
- ^{1} French Land Register data, which excludes lakes, ponds, glaciers > 1 km^{2} (0.386 sq mi or 247 acres) and river estuaries.

Coulommiers-la-Tour (French pronunciation: [kulɔmje la tuʁ]) is a commune in the Loir-et-Cher department of central France.

== Population ==
Historical population
| Year | Pop. | ±% p.a. |
|---|---|---|
| 1968 | 333 | — |
| 1975 | 329 | −0.17% |
| 1982 | 440 | +4.24% |
| 1990 | 455 | +0.42% |
| 1999 | 476 | +0.50% |
| 2007 | 522 | +1.16% |
| 2012 | 510 | −0.46% |
| 2017 | 557 | +1.78% |
| 2023 | 575 | +0.53% |
Source: INSEE

== See also ==
- Communes of the Loir-et-Cher department
