= Gombergean =

- Commune
- Coat of arms
- Location of Gombergean
- Location within France Location within Centre-Val de Loire
- Coordinates: 47°39′07″N 1°05′03″E
- Country: France
- Region: Centre-Val de Loire
- Department: Loir-et-Cher
- Arrondissement: Vendôme
- Canton: Montoire-sur-le-Loir
- Intercommunality: CA Territoires Vendômois

Government
  - Mayor (2020–2026): Sylvie Deux
- Area^{1}: 12.18 km^{2} (4.70 sq mi)
- Elevation: 121 m (397 ft)
- Highest elevation: 130 m (430 ft)
- Lowest elevation: 114 m (374 ft)
- Population (2023): 167
  - Density: 13.7/km^{2} (35.5/sq mi)
- Time zone: UTC+01:00 (CET)
  - Summer (DST): UTC+02:00 (CEST)
- INSEE/Postal code: 41098 /41310
- ^{1} French Land Register data, which excludes lakes, ponds, glaciers > 1 km^{2} (0.386 sq mi or 247 acres) and river estuaries.

Gombergean (French pronunciation: [ɡɔ̃bɛʁʒɑ̃]) is a commune in the Loir-et-Cher department of central France.

== Population ==
Historical population
Year	Pop.	±% p.a.
1968	178	—
1975	172	−0.49%
1982	136	−3.30%
1990	146	+0.89%
1999	145	−0.08%
2007	156	+0.92%
2012	191	+4.13%
2017	188	−0.32%
2023	167	−1.95%
Source: INSEE

== See also ==
- Communes of the Loir-et-Cher department
