= Naveil =

- Commune
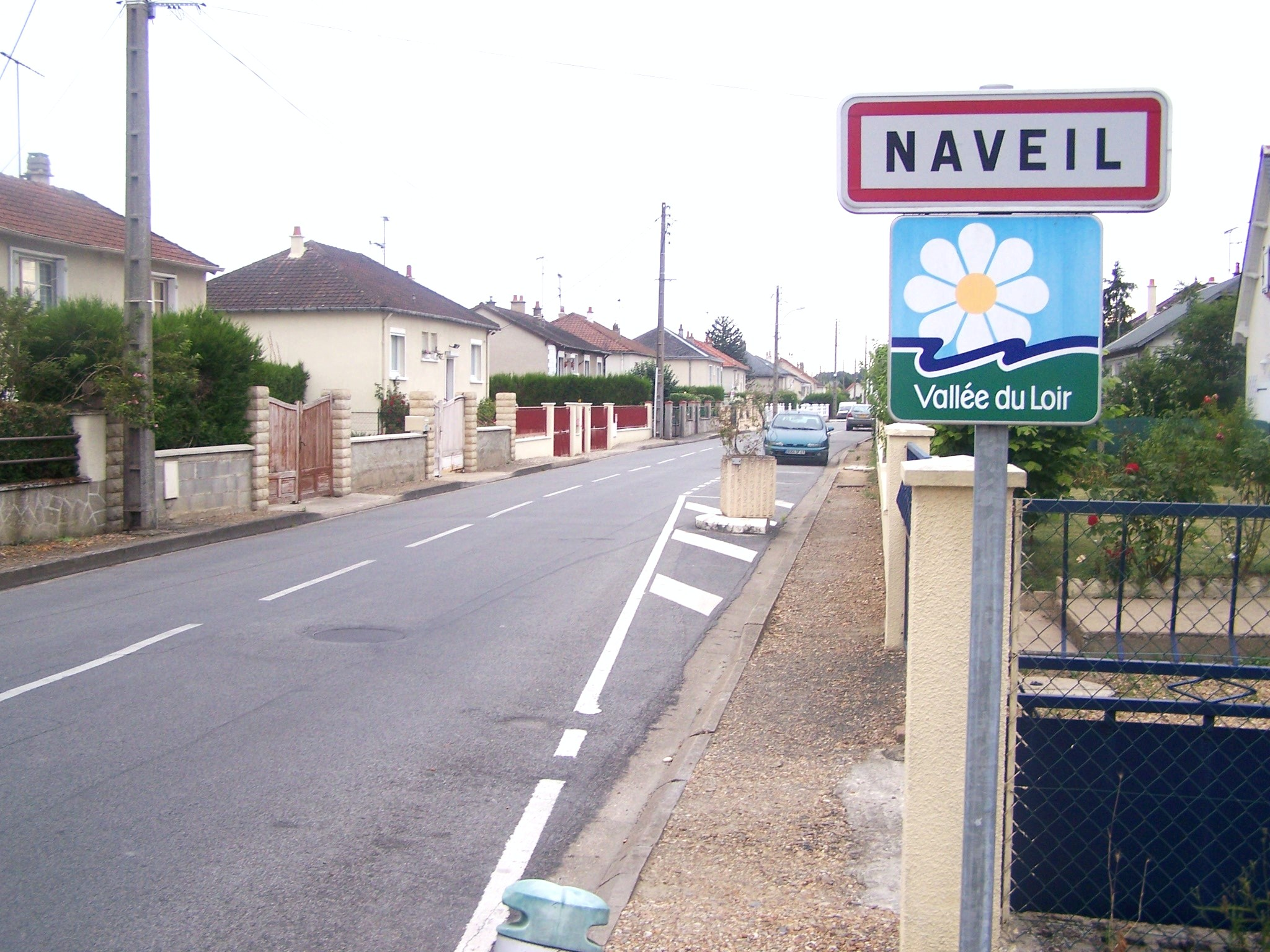

- Coat of arms
- Location of Naveil
- Location within France Location within Centre-Val de Loire
- Coordinates: 47°47′39″N 1°01′50″E
- Country: France
- Region: Centre-Val de Loire
- Department: Loir-et-Cher
- Arrondissement: Vendôme
- Canton: Montoire-sur-le-Loir
- Intercommunality: CA Territoires Vendômois

Government
  - Mayor (2020–2026): Magali Marty Royer
- Area^{1}: 13.24 km^{2} (5.11 sq mi)
- Elevation: 70 m (230 ft)
- Highest elevation: 137 m (449 ft)
- Lowest elevation: 72 m (236 ft)
- Population (2023): 2,442
  - Density: 184.4/km^{2} (477.7/sq mi)
- Time zone: UTC+01:00 (CET)
  - Summer (DST): UTC+02:00 (CEST)
- INSEE/Postal code: 41158 /41100
- ^{1} French Land Register data, which excludes lakes, ponds, glaciers > 1 km^{2} (0.386 sq mi or 247 acres) and river estuaries.

Naveil (French pronunciation: [navɛj]) is a commune in the Loir-et-Cher department of central France.

== Population ==
Historical population

Year	Pop.	±% p.a.
1793	1,050	—
1821	1,155	+0.34%
1846	1,167	+0.04%
1872	1,116	−0.17%
1901	967	−0.49%
1926	919	−0.20%
1946	1,048	+0.66%
1962	1,259	+1.15%
1968	1,368	+1.39%

Year	Pop.	±% p.a.
1975	1,358	−0.10%
1982	1,657	+2.88%
1990	1,855	+1.42%
1999	1,833	−0.13%
2007	2,000	+1.10%
2012	2,172	+1.66%
2017	2,361	+1.68%
2023	2,442	+0.56%

Source: EHESS and INSEE (1968-2023)

== See also ==
- Communes of the Loir-et-Cher department
