= Saint-Amand-Longpré =

- Commune
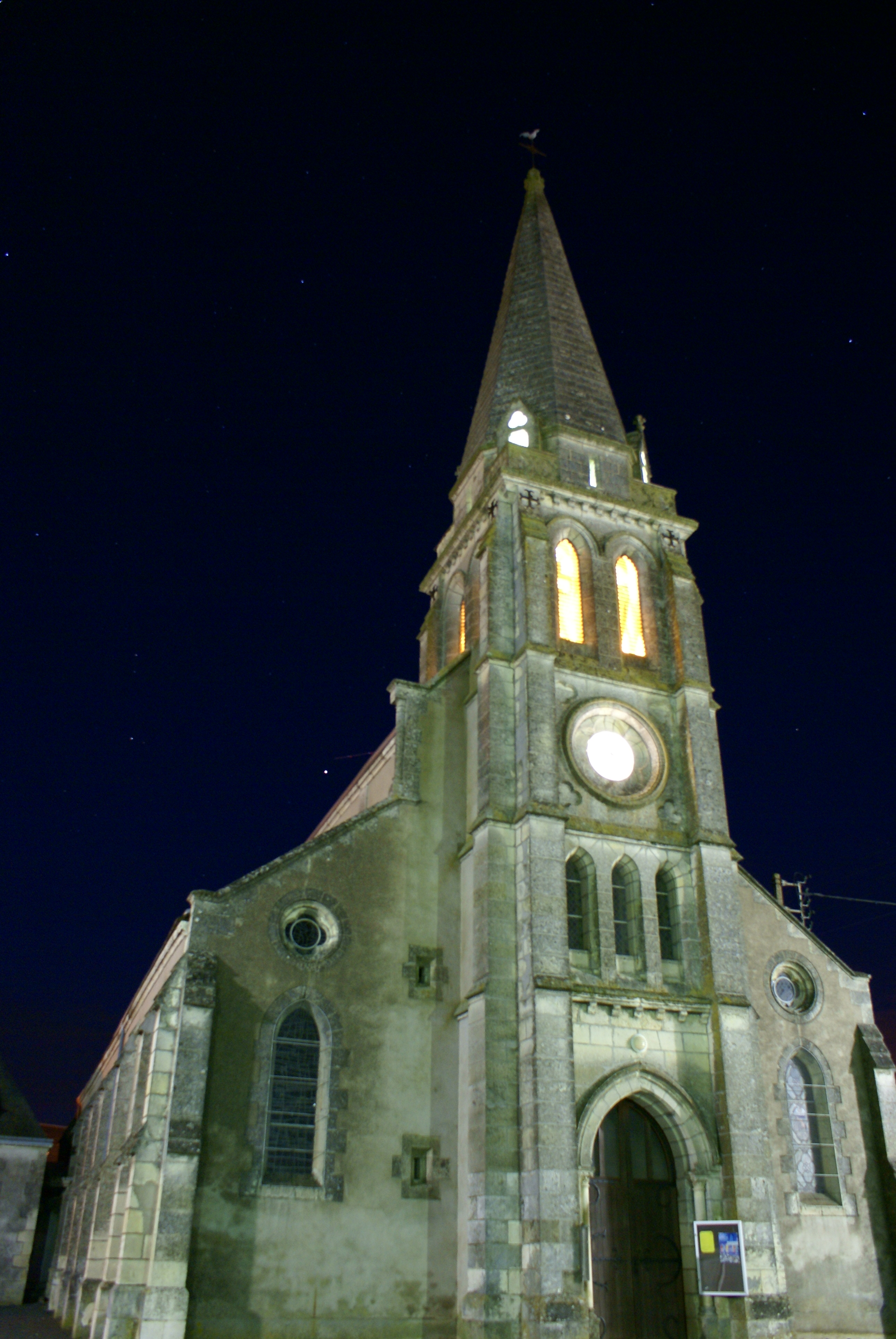

- Coat of arms
- Location of Saint-Amand-Longpré
- Location within France Location within Centre-Val de Loire
- Coordinates: 47°41′27″N 1°01′03″E
- Country: France
- Region: Centre-Val de Loire
- Department: Loir-et-Cher
- Arrondissement: Vendôme
- Canton: Montoire-sur-le-Loir
- Intercommunality: CA Territoires Vendômois

Government
  - Mayor (2024–2026): Daniel Roger
- Area^{1}: 21.37 km^{2} (8.25 sq mi)
- Elevation: 124 m (407 ft)
- Highest elevation: 134 m (440 ft)
- Lowest elevation: 102 m (335 ft)
- Population (2023): 1,218
  - Density: 57.00/km^{2} (147.6/sq mi)
- Time zone: UTC+01:00 (CET)
  - Summer (DST): UTC+02:00 (CEST)
- INSEE/Postal code: 41199 /41310
- ^{1} French Land Register data, which excludes lakes, ponds, glaciers > 1 km^{2} (0.386 sq mi or 247 acres) and river estuaries.

Saint-Amand-Longpré (French pronunciation: [sɛ̃.t‿amɑ̃ lɔ̃pʁe]) is a commune in the Loir-et-Cher department of central France. The commune was formed in 1965 by the merger of the former communes Saint-Amand-de-Vendôme and Longpré.

== Population ==
Historical population
Year	Pop.	±% p.a.
1968	940	—
1975	939	−0.02%
1982	1,009	+1.03%
1990	949	−0.76%
1999	1,035	+0.97%
2007	1,161	+1.45%
2012	1,226	+1.10%
2017	1,224	−0.03%
2023	1,218	−0.08%
Source: INSEE

== See also ==
- Communes of the Loir-et-Cher department
