= Villeromain =

- Commune
- Coat of arms
- Location of Villeromain
- Location within France Location within Centre-Val de Loire
- Coordinates: 47°43′47″N 1°08′38″E
- Country: France
- Region: Centre-Val de Loire
- Department: Loir-et-Cher
- Arrondissement: Vendôme
- Canton: Montoire-sur-le-Loir
- Intercommunality: CA Territoires Vendômois

Government
  - Mayor (2020–2026): François Cochet
- Area^{1}: 13.08 km^{2} (5.05 sq mi)
- Elevation: 126 m (413 ft)
- Highest elevation: 133 m (436 ft)
- Lowest elevation: 114 m (374 ft)
- Population (2023): 216
  - Density: 16.5/km^{2} (42.8/sq mi)
- Time zone: UTC+01:00 (CET)
  - Summer (DST): UTC+02:00 (CEST)
- INSEE/Postal code: 41290 /41100
- ^{1} French Land Register data, which excludes lakes, ponds, glaciers > 1 km^{2} (0.386 sq mi or 247 acres) and river estuaries.

Villeromain (French pronunciation: [vilʁɔmɛ̃]) is a commune in the Loir-et-Cher department in central France.

== Population ==
Historical population
Year	Pop.	±% p.a.
1968	238	—
1975	206	−2.04%
1982	210	+0.28%
1990	211	+0.06%
1999	198	−0.70%
2007	206	+0.50%
2012	232	+2.41%
2017	240	+0.68%
2023	216	−1.74%
Source: INSEE

== See also ==
- Communes of the Loir-et-Cher department
