= Lancé =

- Commune
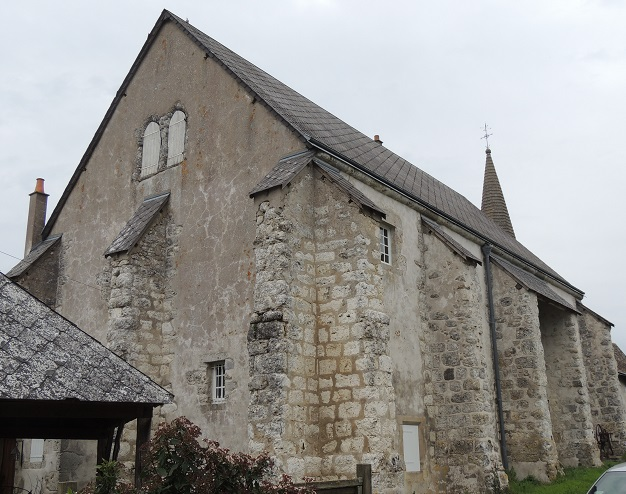

- Coat of arms
- Location of Lancé
- Location within France Location within Centre-Val de Loire
- Coordinates: 47°41′41″N 1°04′06″E
- Country: France
- Region: Centre-Val de Loire
- Department: Loir-et-Cher
- Arrondissement: Vendôme
- Canton: Montoire-sur-le-Loir
- Intercommunality: CA Territoires Vendômois

Government
  - Mayor (2020–2026): Yann Trimardeau
- Area^{1}: 18.01 km^{2} (6.95 sq mi)
- Elevation: 127 m (417 ft)
- Highest elevation: 131 m (430 ft)
- Lowest elevation: 116 m (381 ft)
- Population (2023): 471
  - Density: 26.2/km^{2} (67.7/sq mi)
- Time zone: UTC+01:00 (CET)
  - Summer (DST): UTC+02:00 (CEST)
- INSEE/Postal code: 41107 /41310
- ^{1} French Land Register data, which excludes lakes, ponds, glaciers > 1 km^{2} (0.386 sq mi or 247 acres) and river estuaries.

Lancé (French pronunciation: [lɑ̃se]) is a commune in the Loir-et-Cher department of central France.

== Population ==
Historical population
Year	Pop.	±% p.a.
1968	434	—
1975	367	−2.37%
1982	345	−0.88%
1990	414	+2.31%
1999	407	−0.19%
2007	434	+0.81%
2012	450	+0.73%
2017	473	+1.00%
2023	471	−0.07%
Source: INSEE

== See also ==
- Communes of the Loir-et-Cher department
