= Périgny, Loir-et-Cher =

Périgny
- Commune
- Coat of arms
- Location of Périgny
- Location within France Location within Centre-Val de Loire
- Coordinates: 47°44′28″N 1°09′04″E
- Country: France
- Region: Centre-Val de Loire
- Department: Loir-et-Cher
- Arrondissement: Vendôme
- Canton: Montoire-sur-le-Loir
- Intercommunality: CA Territoires Vendômois

Government
  - Mayor (2020–2026): Jean-François Loiseau
- Area^{1}: 10.41 km^{2} (4.02 sq mi)
- Elevation: 124 m (407 ft)
- Highest elevation: 131 m (430 ft)
- Lowest elevation: 97 m (318 ft)
- Population (2023): 166
  - Density: 15.9/km^{2} (41.3/sq mi)
- Time zone: UTC+01:00 (CET)
  - Summer (DST): UTC+02:00 (CEST)
- INSEE/Postal code: 41174 /41100
- ^{1} French Land Register data, which excludes lakes, ponds, glaciers > 1 km^{2} (0.386 sq mi or 247 acres) and river estuaries.

Périgny (French pronunciation: [peʁiɲi]) is a commune in the Loir-et-Cher department of central France.

== Population ==
Historical population
Year	Pop.	±% p.a.
1968	211	—
1975	205	−0.41%
1982	169	−2.72%
1990	175	+0.44%
1999	188	+0.80%
2007	202	+0.90%
2012	187	−1.53%
2017	177	−1.09%
2023	166	−1.06%
Source: INSEE

== See also ==
- Communes of the Loir-et-Cher department
