= Les Hayes =

- Commune
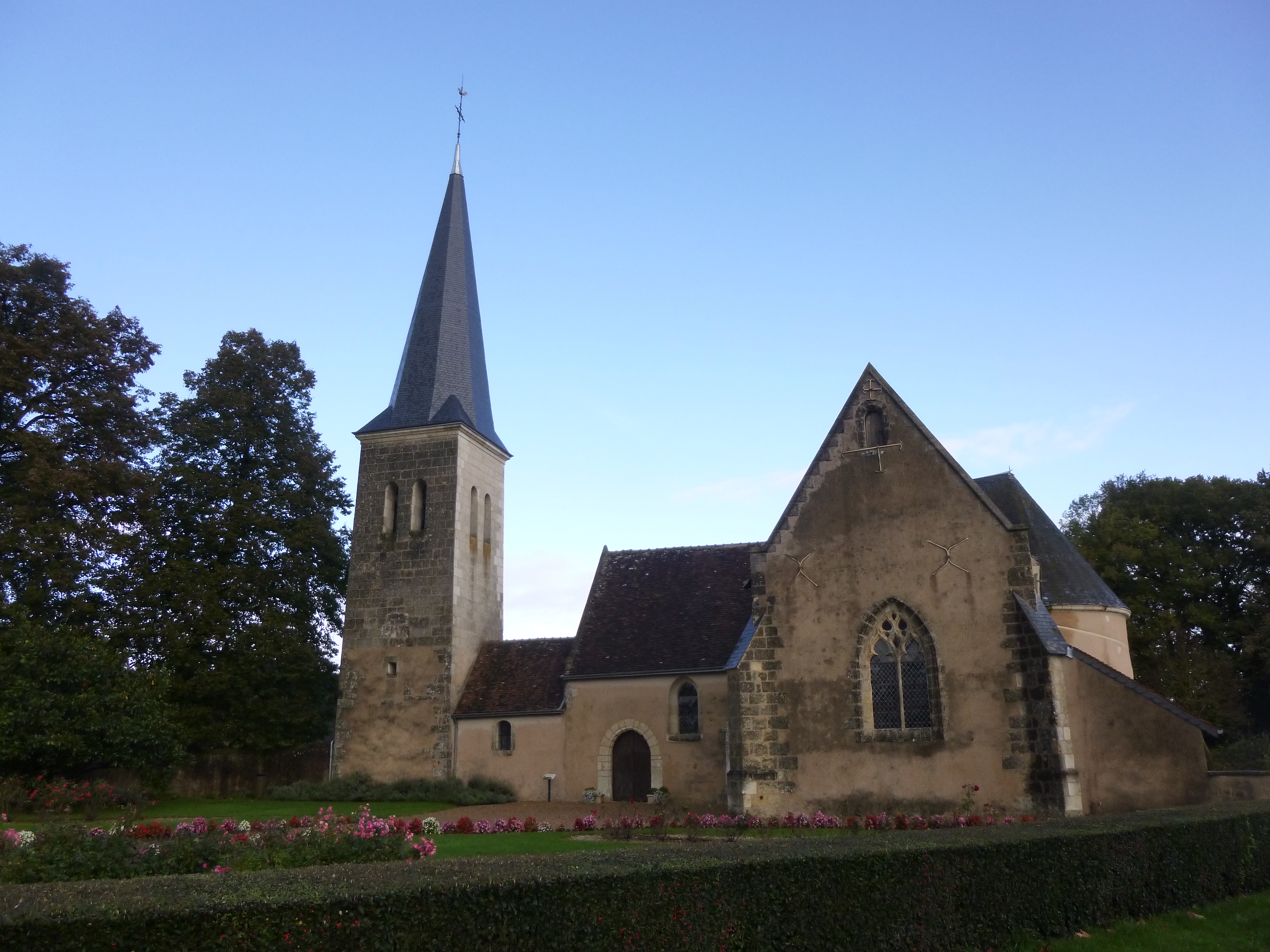
- Church of Saint-Léonard

- Coat of arms
- Location of Les Hayes
- Location within France Location within Centre-Val de Loire
- Coordinates: 47°42′58″N 0°46′40″E
- Country: France
- Region: Centre-Val de Loire
- Department: Loir-et-Cher
- Arrondissement: Vendôme
- Canton: Montoire-sur-le-Loir
- Intercommunality: CA Territoires Vendômois

Government
  - Mayor (2020–2026): Sylvain Corbeau
- Area^{1}: 15.71 km^{2} (6.07 sq mi)
- Elevation: 144 m (472 ft)
- Highest elevation: 156 m (512 ft)
- Lowest elevation: 93 m (305 ft)
- Population (2023): 175
  - Density: 11.1/km^{2} (28.9/sq mi)
- Time zone: UTC+01:00 (CET)
  - Summer (DST): UTC+02:00 (CEST)
- INSEE/Postal code: 41100 /41800
- ^{1} French Land Register data, which excludes lakes, ponds, glaciers > 1 km^{2} (0.386 sq mi or 247 acres) and river estuaries.

Les Hayes (French pronunciation: [le ɛ]) is a commune in the Loir-et-Cher department of central France part of the Territoires Vendômois community. The village covers an area of 15.79 square kilometers, at an altitude of 135 meters.

== Population ==
Historical population
Year	Pop.	±% p.a.
1968	280	—
1975	245	−1.89%
1982	188	−3.71%
1990	169	−1.32%
1999	169	+0.00%
2007	186	+1.21%
2012	195	+0.95%
2017	176	−2.03%
2023	175	−0.09%
Source: INSEE

== See also ==
- Communes of the Loir-et-Cher department
