= Sasnières =

- Commune
- Coat of arms
- Location of Sasnières
- Location within France Location within Centre-Val de Loire
- Coordinates: 47°43′09″N 0°56′11″E
- Country: France
- Region: Centre-Val de Loire
- Department: Loir-et-Cher
- Arrondissement: Vendôme
- Canton: Montoire-sur-le-Loir
- Intercommunality: CA Territoires Vendômois

Government
  - Mayor (2020–2026): Claire Granger
- Area^{1}: 7.83 km^{2} (3.02 sq mi)
- Elevation: 121 m (397 ft)
- Highest elevation: 145 m (476 ft)
- Lowest elevation: 81 m (266 ft)
- Population (2023): 88
  - Density: 11/km^{2} (29/sq mi)
- Time zone: UTC+01:00 (CET)
  - Summer (DST): UTC+02:00 (CEST)
- INSEE/Postal code: 41236 /41310
- ^{1} French Land Register data, which excludes lakes, ponds, glaciers > 1 km^{2} (0.386 sq mi or 247 acres) and river estuaries.

Sasnières (French pronunciation: [sanjɛʁ]) is a commune in the Loir-et-Cher department in central France.

== Population ==
Historical population
Year	Pop.	±% p.a.
1968	134	—
1975	119	−1.68%
1982	104	−1.91%
1990	71	−4.66%
1999	69	−0.32%
2007	99	+4.62%
2012	106	+1.38%
2017	112	+1.11%
2023	88	−3.94%
Source: INSEE

== Politics ==
During the 2008 election, Guillaume Henrion became the new mayor of Sasnières. In 2014, Claire Granger was elected the mayor of Sasnières.

== See also ==
- Communes of the Loir-et-Cher department
