= Montrouveau =

- Commune
- Coat of arms
- Location of Montrouveau
- Location within France Location within Centre-Val de Loire
- Coordinates: 47°42′55″N 0°43′47″E
- Country: France
- Region: Centre-Val de Loire
- Department: Loir-et-Cher
- Arrondissement: Vendôme
- Canton: Montoire-sur-le-Loir
- Intercommunality: CA Territoires Vendômois

Government
  - Mayor (2020–2026): Yves Dolbeau
- Area^{1}: 17.7 km^{2} (6.8 sq mi)
- Elevation: 140 m (460 ft)
- Highest elevation: 141 m (463 ft)
- Lowest elevation: 94 m (308 ft)
- Population (2023): 143
  - Density: 8.08/km^{2} (20.9/sq mi)
- Time zone: UTC+01:00 (CET)
  - Summer (DST): UTC+02:00 (CEST)
- INSEE/Postal code: 41153 /41800
- ^{1} French Land Register data, which excludes lakes, ponds, glaciers > 1 km^{2} (0.386 sq mi or 247 acres) and river estuaries.

Montrouveau is a commune in the Loir-et-Cher department of central France.

== Population ==
Historical population
Year	Pop.	±% p.a.
1968	217	—
1975	171	−3.35%
1982	139	−2.92%
1990	113	−2.56%
1999	110	−0.30%
2007	127	+1.81%
2012	141	+2.11%
2017	154	+1.78%
2023	143	−1.23%
Source: INSEE

== See also ==
- Communes of the Loir-et-Cher department
