= Huisseau-en-Beauce =

- Commune
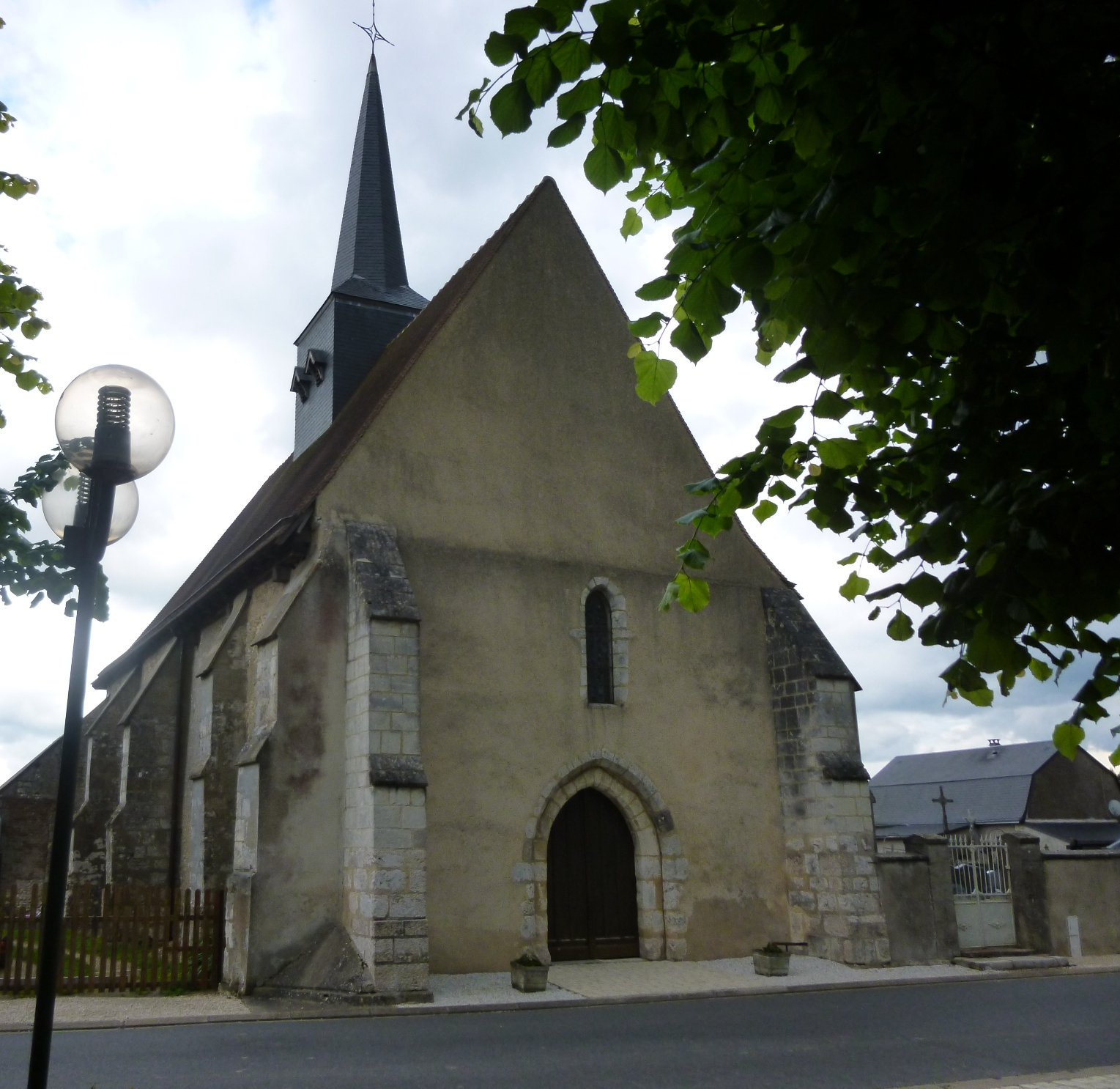

- Coat of arms
- Location of Huisseau-en-Beauce
- Location within France Location within Centre-Val de Loire
- Coordinates: 47°43′25″N 1°00′39″E
- Country: France
- Region: Centre-Val de Loire
- Department: Loir-et-Cher
- Arrondissement: Vendôme
- Canton: Montoire-sur-le-Loir
- Intercommunality: CA Territoires Vendômois

Government
  - Mayor (2020–2026): Chantal Fedele
- Area^{1}: 8.98 km^{2} (3.47 sq mi)
- Elevation: 120 m (390 ft)
- Highest elevation: 131 m (430 ft)
- Lowest elevation: 90 m (300 ft)
- Population (2023): 406
  - Density: 45.2/km^{2} (117/sq mi)
- Time zone: UTC+01:00 (CET)
  - Summer (DST): UTC+02:00 (CEST)
- INSEE/Postal code: 41103 /41310
- ^{1} French Land Register data, which excludes lakes, ponds, glaciers > 1 km^{2} (0.386 sq mi or 247 acres) and river estuaries.

Huisseau-en-Beauce (French pronunciation: [ɥiso ɑ̃ bos], literally Huisseau in Beauce) is a commune in the Loir-et-Cher department of central France.

== Population ==
Historical population
Year	Pop.	±% p.a.
1968	296	—
1975	243	−2.78%
1982	260	+0.97%
1990	316	+2.47%
1999	314	−0.07%
2007	407	+3.30%
2012	401	−0.30%
2017	423	+1.07%
2023	406	−0.68%
Source: INSEE

== See also ==
- Communes of the Loir-et-Cher department
