= Villechauve =

- Commune
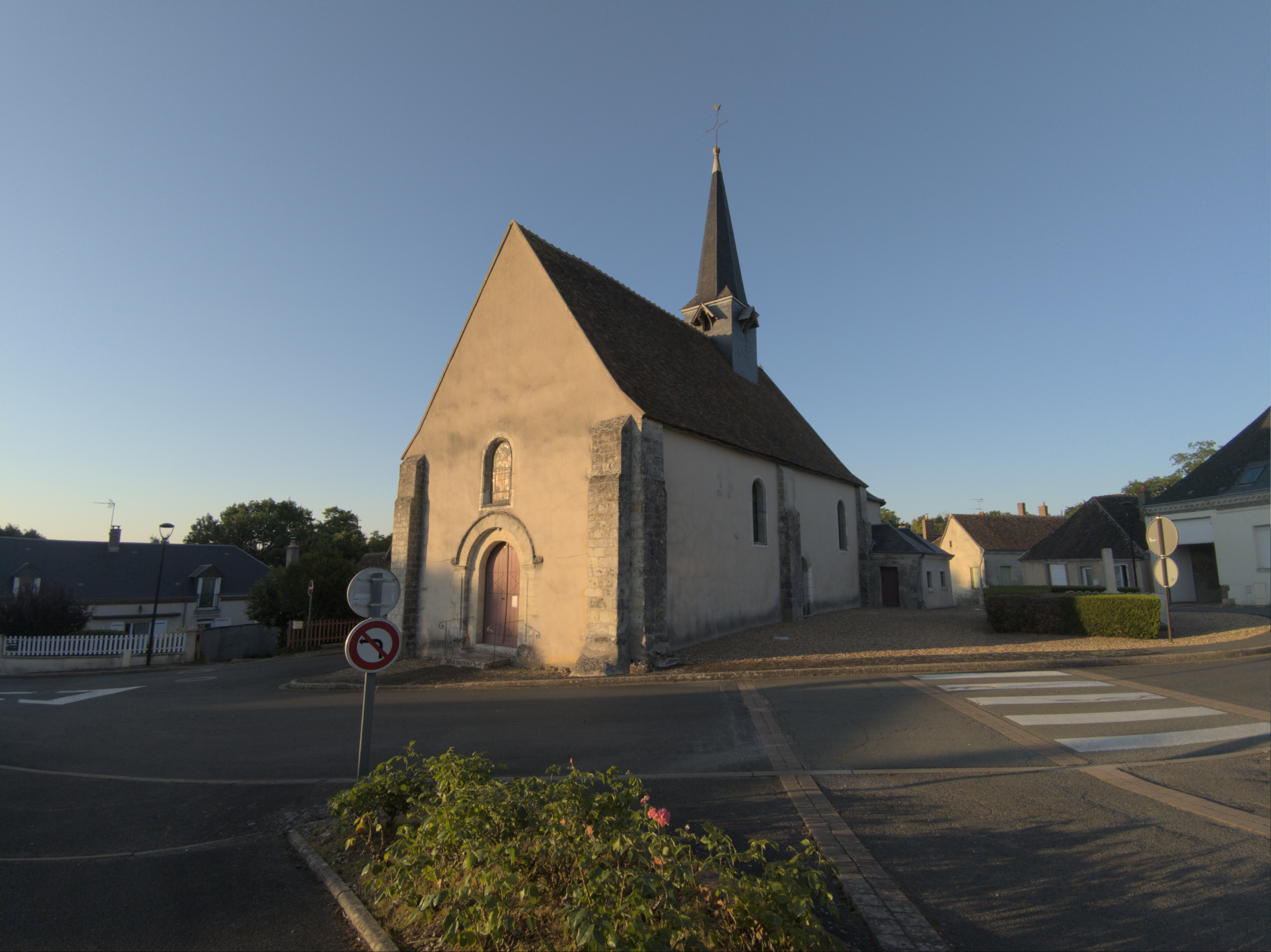
- Church in Villechauve

- Coat of arms
- Location of Villechauve
- Location within France Location within Centre-Val de Loire
- Coordinates: 47°39′02″N 0°56′33″E
- Country: France
- Region: Centre-Val de Loire
- Department: Loir-et-Cher
- Arrondissement: Vendôme
- Canton: Montoire-sur-le-Loir
- Intercommunality: CA Territoires Vendômois

Government
  - Mayor (2020–2026): Alain Lajoux
- Area^{1}: 11.02 km^{2} (4.25 sq mi)
- Elevation: 1,151 m (3,776 ft)
- Highest elevation: 147 m (482 ft)
- Lowest elevation: 97 m (318 ft)
- Population (2023): 256
  - Density: 23.2/km^{2} (60.2/sq mi)
- Time zone: UTC+01:00 (CET)
  - Summer (DST): UTC+02:00 (CEST)
- INSEE/Postal code: 41278 /41310
- ^{1} French Land Register data, which excludes lakes, ponds, glaciers > 1 km^{2} (0.386 sq mi or 247 acres) and river estuaries.

Villechauve (French pronunciation: [vilʃov]) is a commune in the Loir-et-Cher department in central France.

== Population ==
Historical population
Year	Pop.	±% p.a.
1968	293	—
1975	266	−1.37%
1982	247	−1.05%
1990	251	+0.20%
1999	270	+0.81%
2007	288	+0.81%
2012	293	+0.34%
2017	276	−1.19%
2023	256	−1.25%
Source: INSEE

== See also ==
- Communes of the Loir-et-Cher department
