= Prunay-Cassereau =

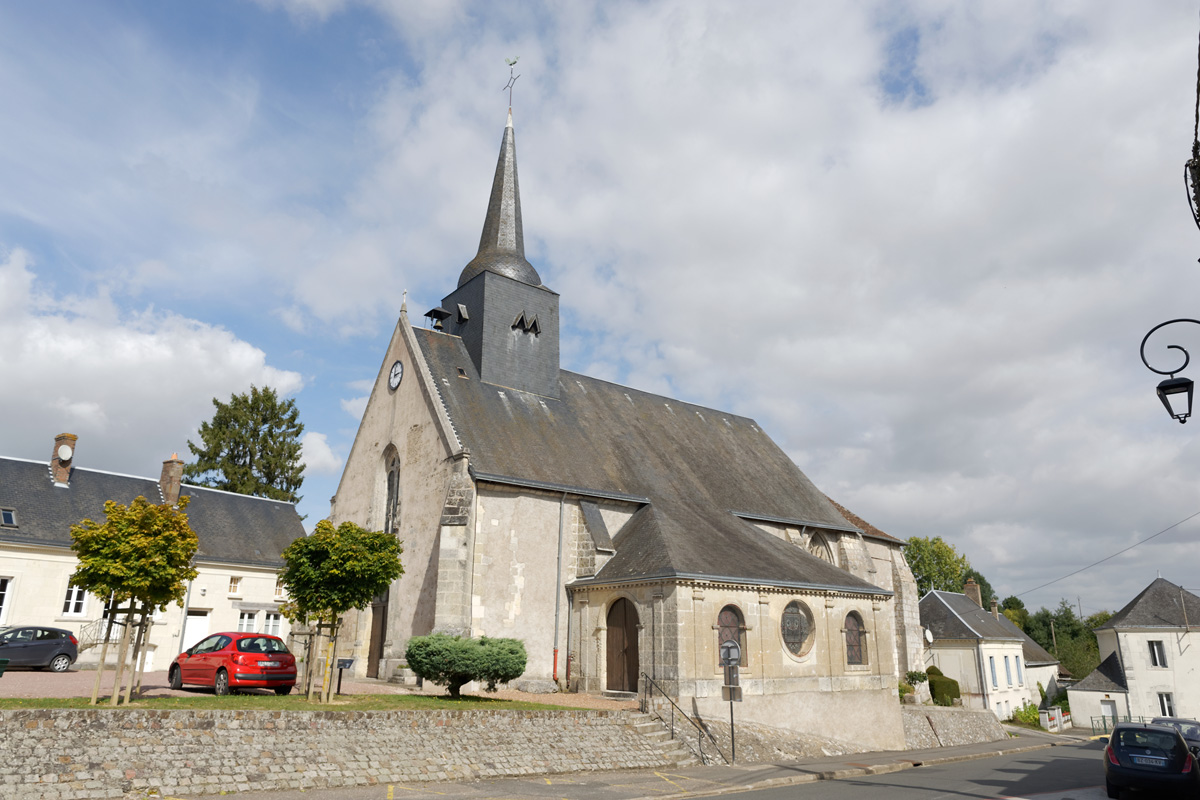
- Church of Saint-Jean-Baptiste

- Coat of arms
- Location of Prunay-Cassereau
- Location within France Location within Centre-Val de Loire
- Coordinates: 47°41′46″N 0°55′18″E
- Country: France
- Region: Centre-Val de Loire
- Department: Loir-et-Cher
- Arrondissement: Vendôme
- Canton: Montoire-sur-le-Loir
- Intercommunality: CA Territoires Vendômois

Government
  - Mayor (2020–2026): Éric Bardet
- Area^{1}: 32.85 km^{2} (12.68 sq mi)
- Elevation: 149 m (489 ft)
- Highest elevation: 154 m (505 ft)
- Lowest elevation: 99 m (325 ft)
- Population (2023): 577
  - Density: 17.6/km^{2} (45.5/sq mi)
- Time zone: UTC+01:00 (CET)
  - Summer (DST): UTC+02:00 (CEST)
- INSEE/Postal code: 41184 /41310
- ^{1} French Land Register data, which excludes lakes, ponds, glaciers > 1 km^{2} (0.386 sq mi or 247 acres) and river estuaries.

Prunay-Cassereau (French pronunciation: [pʁynɛ kasʁo]) is a commune in the Loir-et-Cher department of central France.

== Population ==
Historical population
Year	Pop.	±% p.a.
1968	656	—
1975	573	−1.91%
1982	557	−0.40%
1990	520	−0.86%
1999	607	+1.73%
2007	640	+0.66%
2012	635	−0.16%
2017	612	−0.74%
2023	577	−0.98%
Source: INSEE

== See also ==
- Communes of the Loir-et-Cher department
