= Faye, Loir-et-Cher =

Faye
- Commune
- Coat of arms
- Location of Faye
- Location within France Location within Centre-Val de Loire
- Coordinates: 47°48′11″N 1°10′39″E
- Country: France
- Region: Centre-Val de Loire
- Department: Loir-et-Cher
- Arrondissement: Vendôme
- Canton: Montoire-sur-le-Loir
- Intercommunality: CA Territoires Vendômois

Government
  - Mayor (2020–2026): Annette Garnier
- Area^{1}: 8.7 km^{2} (3.4 sq mi)
- Elevation: 128 m (420 ft)
- Highest elevation: 133 m (436 ft)
- Lowest elevation: 98 m (322 ft)
- Population (2023): 216
  - Density: 25/km^{2} (64/sq mi)
- Time zone: UTC+01:00 (CET)
  - Summer (DST): UTC+02:00 (CEST)
- INSEE/Postal code: 41081 /41100
- ^{1} French Land Register data, which excludes lakes, ponds, glaciers > 1 km^{2} (0.386 sq mi or 247 acres) and river estuaries.

Faye is a commune in the Loir-et-Cher department of central France.

== Population ==
Historical population
Year	Pop.	±% p.a.
1968	187	—
1975	157	−2.47%
1982	152	−0.46%
1990	152	+0.00%
1999	182	+2.02%
2007	190	+0.54%
2012	228	+3.71%
2017	243	+1.28%
2023	216	−1.94%
Source: INSEE

== See also ==
- Communes of the Loir-et-Cher department
