= Villetrun =

- Commune
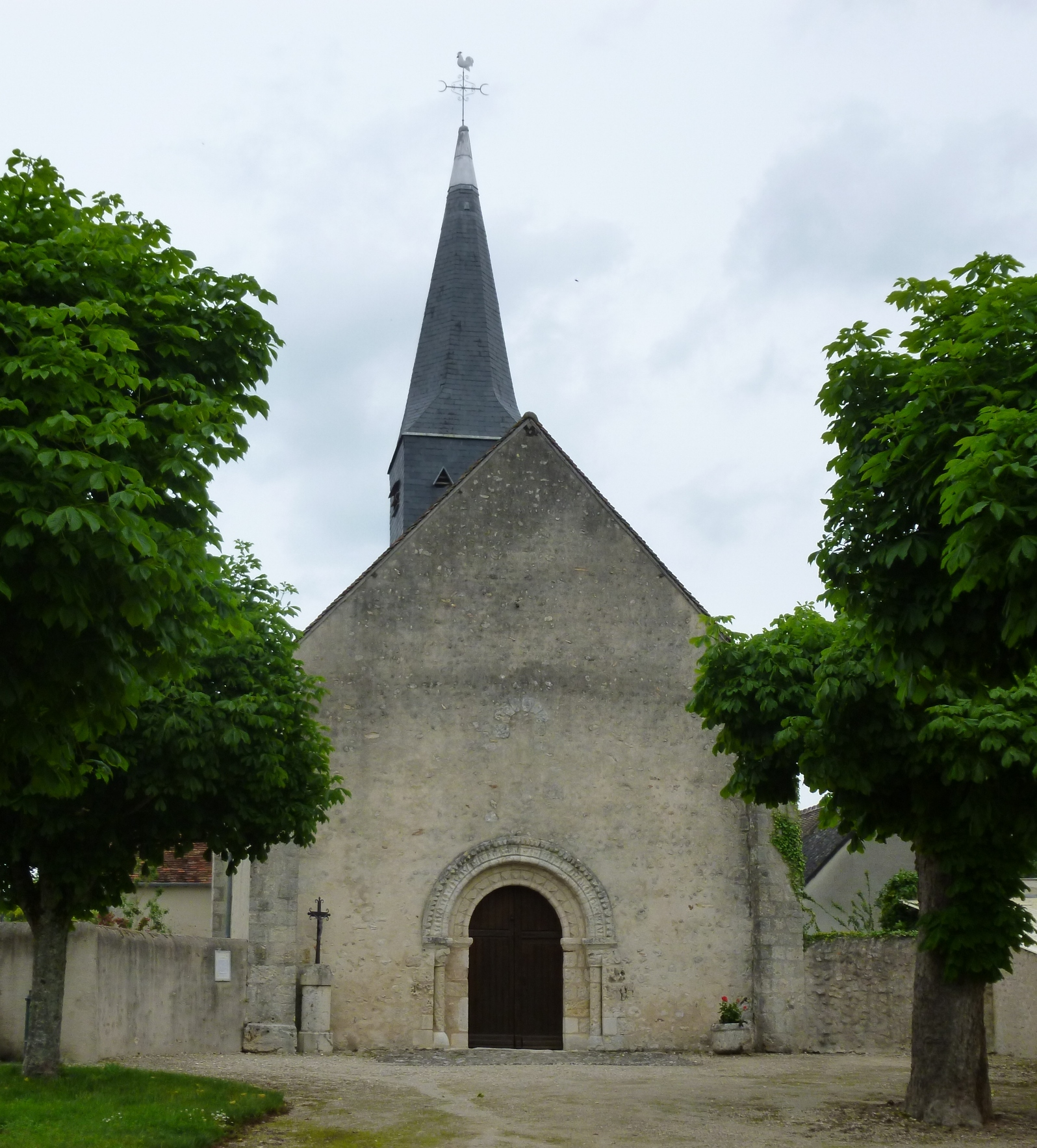

- Coat of arms
- Location of Villetrun
- Location within France Location within Centre-Val de Loire
- Coordinates: 47°47′14″N 1°09′39″E
- Country: France
- Region: Centre-Val de Loire
- Department: Loir-et-Cher
- Arrondissement: Vendôme
- Canton: Montoire-sur-le-Loir
- Intercommunality: CA Territoires Vendômois

Government
  - Mayor (2020–2026): Anne-Marie Hubert
- Area^{1}: 6.83 km^{2} (2.64 sq mi)
- Elevation: 110 m (360 ft)
- Highest elevation: 131 m (430 ft)
- Lowest elevation: 109 m (358 ft)
- Population (2023): 316
  - Density: 46.3/km^{2} (120/sq mi)
- Time zone: UTC+01:00 (CET)
  - Summer (DST): UTC+02:00 (CEST)
- INSEE/Postal code: 41291 /41100
- ^{1} French Land Register data, which excludes lakes, ponds, glaciers > 1 km^{2} (0.386 sq mi or 247 acres) and river estuaries.

Villetrun (French pronunciation: [viltʁœ̃]) is a commune in the Loir-et-Cher department in central France.

== Population ==
Historical population
Year	Pop.	±% p.a.
1968	239	—
1975	213	−1.63%
1982	244	+1.96%
1990	274	+1.46%
1999	269	−0.20%
2007	293	+1.07%
2012	326	+2.16%
2017	322	−0.25%
2023	316	−0.31%
Source: INSEE

== See also ==
- Communes of the Loir-et-Cher department
