= Selommes =

- Commune
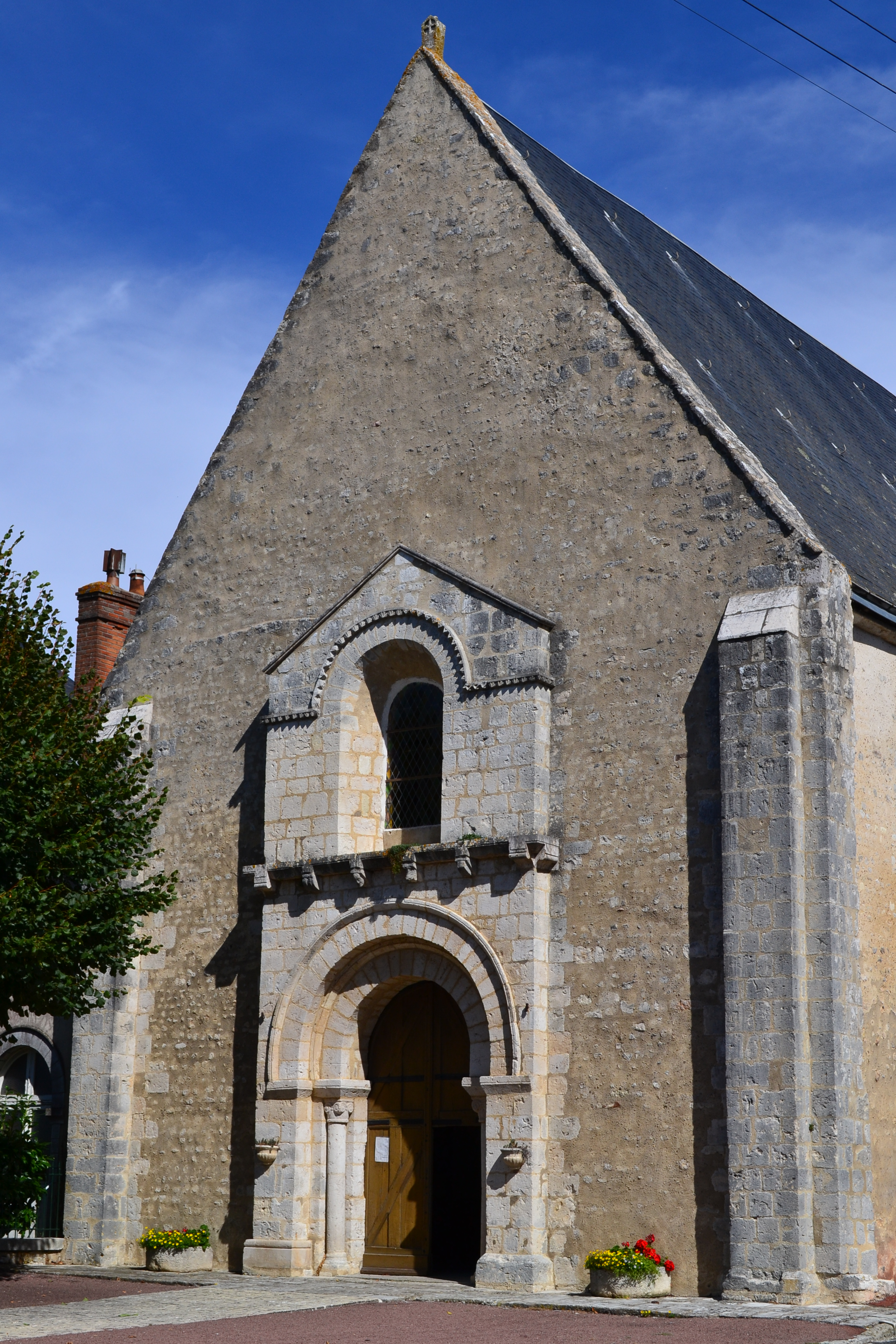
- Church of the Holy Virgin

- Coat of arms
- Location of Selommes
- Location within France Location within Centre-Val de Loire
- Coordinates: 47°45′24″N 1°11′34″E
- Country: France
- Region: Centre-Val de Loire
- Department: Loir-et-Cher
- Arrondissement: Vendôme
- Canton: Montoire-sur-le-Loir
- Intercommunality: CA Territoires Vendômois

Government
  - Mayor (2020–2026): Claire Foucher-Maupetit
- Area^{1}: 28.01 km^{2} (10.81 sq mi)
- Elevation: 116 m (381 ft)
- Highest elevation: 131 m (430 ft)
- Lowest elevation: 107 m (351 ft)
- Population (2023): 785
  - Density: 28.0/km^{2} (72.6/sq mi)
- Time zone: UTC+01:00 (CET)
  - Summer (DST): UTC+02:00 (CEST)
- INSEE/Postal code: 41243 /41100
- ^{1} French Land Register data, which excludes lakes, ponds, glaciers > 1 km^{2} (0.386 sq mi or 247 acres) and river estuaries.

Selommes (French pronunciation: [səlɔm]) is a commune in the Loir-et-Cher department of central France.

== Population ==
Historical population
| Year | Pop. | ±% p.a. |
|---|---|---|
| 1968 | 714 | — |
| 1975 | 705 | −0.18% |
| 1982 | 720 | +0.30% |
| 1990 | 734 | +0.24% |
| 1999 | 758 | +0.36% |
| 2007 | 858 | +1.56% |
| 2012 | 836 | −0.52% |
| 2017 | 813 | −0.56% |
| 2023 | 785 | −0.58% |
Source: INSEE

== See also ==
- Communes of the Loir-et-Cher department
