= Villavard =

- Commune
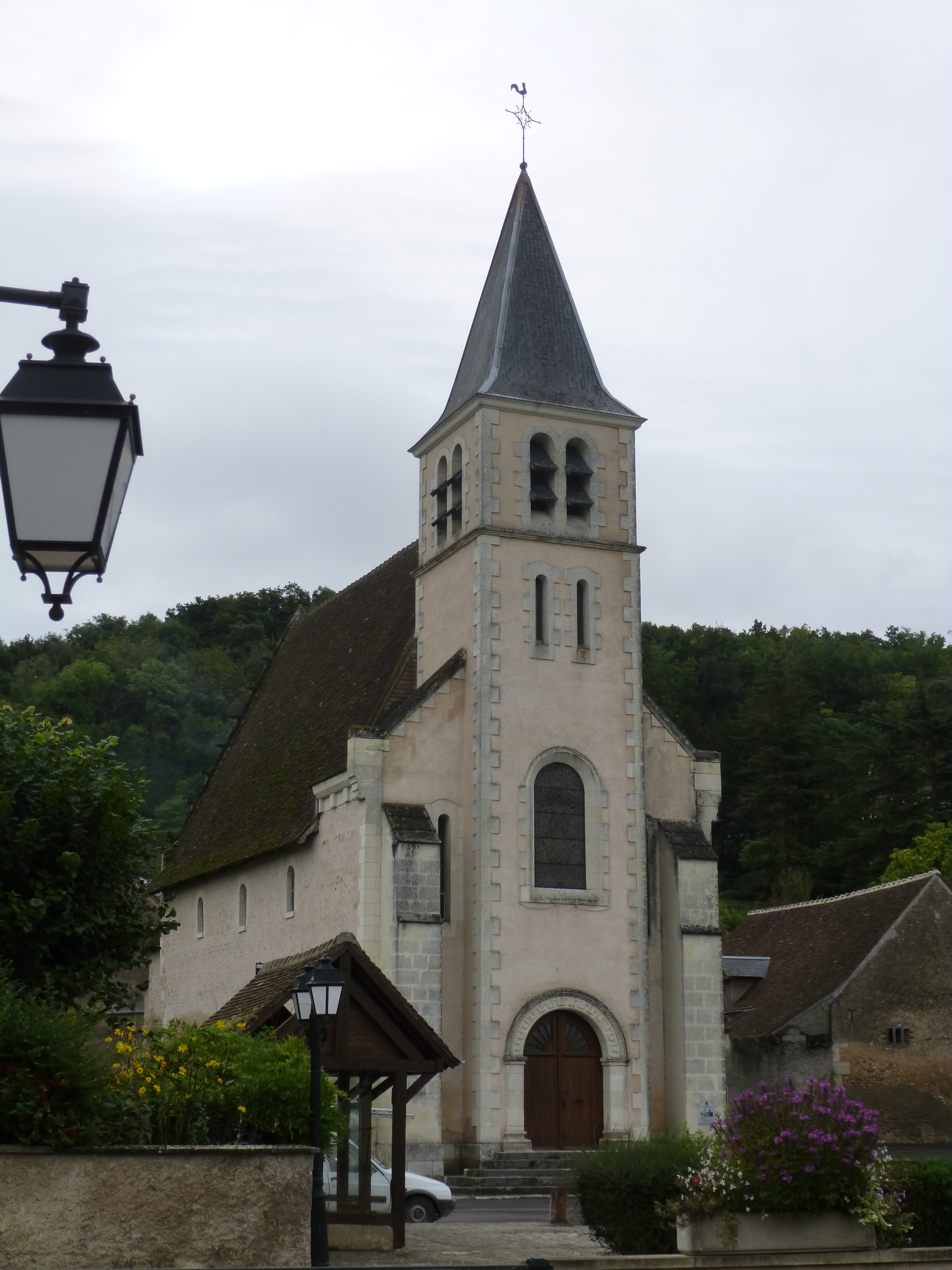
- Church of Our Lady

- Coat of arms
- Location of Villavard
- Location within France Location within Centre-Val de Loire
- Coordinates: 47°45′35″N 0°54′21″E
- Country: France
- Region: Centre-Val de Loire
- Department: Loir-et-Cher
- Arrondissement: Vendôme
- Canton: Montoire-sur-le-Loir
- Intercommunality: CA Territoires Vendômois

Government
  - Mayor (2020–2026): Aimé Houdebert
- Area^{1}: 5.18 km^{2} (2.00 sq mi)
- Elevation: 70 m (230 ft)
- Highest elevation: 131 m (430 ft)
- Lowest elevation: 65 m (213 ft)
- Population (2023): 122
  - Density: 23.6/km^{2} (61.0/sq mi)
- Time zone: UTC+01:00 (CET)
  - Summer (DST): UTC+02:00 (CEST)
- INSEE/Postal code: 41274 /41800
- ^{1} French Land Register data, which excludes lakes, ponds, glaciers > 1 km^{2} (0.386 sq mi or 247 acres) and river estuaries.

Villavard (French pronunciation: [vilavaʁ]) is a commune in the Loir-et-Cher department in central France.

== Population ==
Historical population
Year	Pop.	±% p.a.
1968	164	—
1975	156	−0.71%
1982	134	−2.15%
1990	127	−0.67%
1999	133	+0.51%
2007	147	+1.26%
2012	139	−1.11%
2017	128	−1.64%
2023	122	−0.80%
Source: INSEE

== See also ==
- Communes of the Loir-et-Cher department
