= Ternay, Loir-et-Cher =

Ternay
- Commune
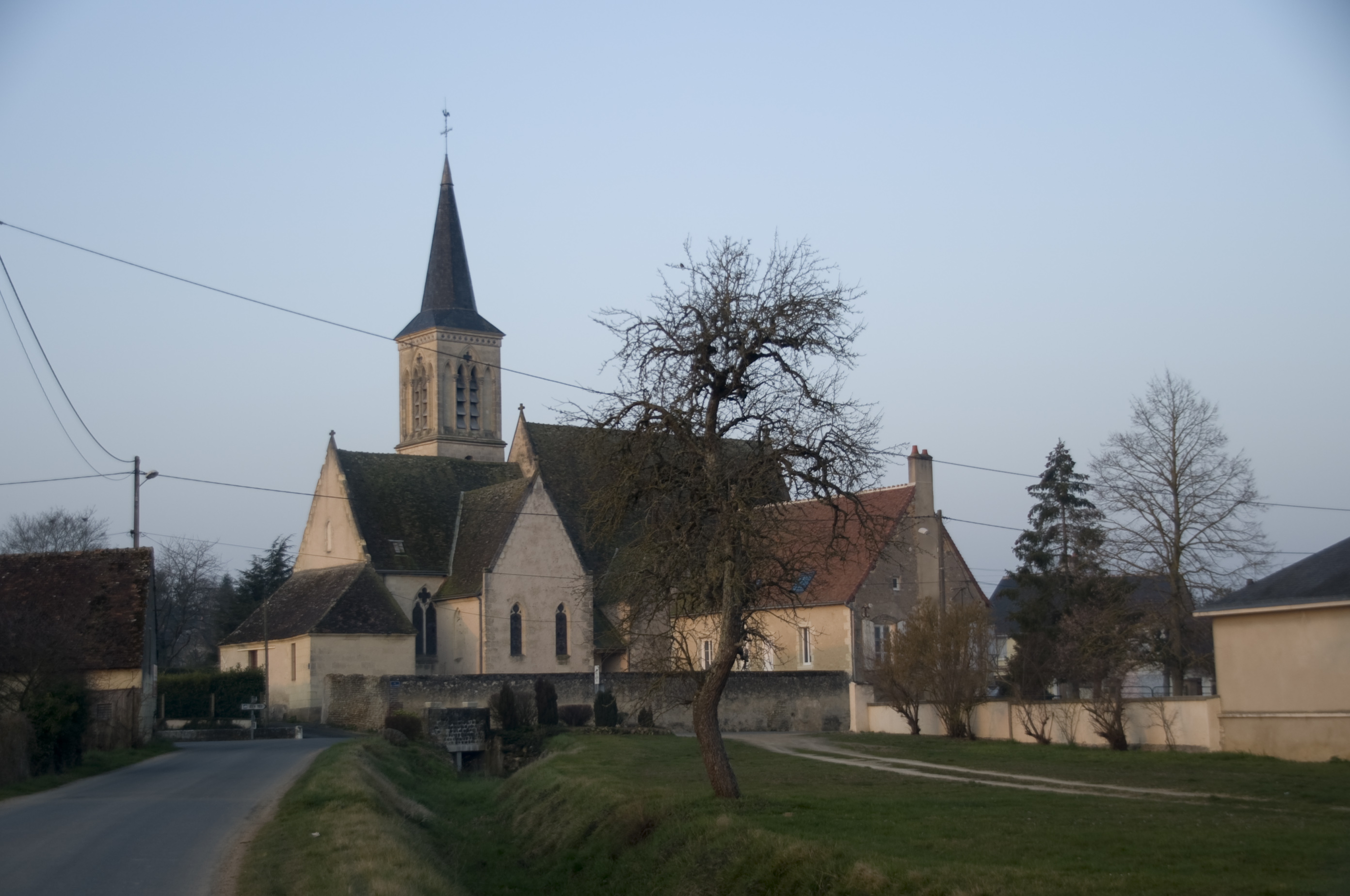

- Coat of arms
- Location of Ternay
- Location within France Location within Centre-Val de Loire
- Coordinates: 47°43′51″N 0°46′48″E
- Country: France
- Region: Centre-Val de Loire
- Department: Loir-et-Cher
- Arrondissement: Vendôme
- Canton: Montoire-sur-le-Loir
- Intercommunality: CA Territoires Vendômois

Government
  - Mayor (2020–2026): Joël Heuzé
- Area^{1}: 14.38 km^{2} (5.55 sq mi)
- Elevation: 137 m (449 ft)
- Highest elevation: 139 m (456 ft)
- Lowest elevation: 59 m (194 ft)
- Population (2023): 331
  - Density: 23.0/km^{2} (59.6/sq mi)
- Time zone: UTC+01:00 (CET)
  - Summer (DST): UTC+02:00 (CEST)
- INSEE/Postal code: 41255 /41800
- ^{1} French Land Register data, which excludes lakes, ponds, glaciers > 1 km^{2} (0.386 sq mi or 247 acres) and river estuaries.

Ternay (French pronunciation: [tɛʁnɛ]) is a commune of the Loir-et-Cher department in central France.

== Population ==
Historical population
| Year | Pop. | ±% p.a. |
|---|---|---|
| 1968 | 421 | — |
| 1975 | 350 | −2.60% |
| 1982 | 282 | −3.04% |
| 1990 | 250 | −1.49% |
| 1999 | 272 | +0.94% |
| 2007 | 298 | +1.15% |
| 2012 | 329 | +2.00% |
| 2017 | 336 | +0.42% |
| 2023 | 331 | −0.25% |
Source: INSEE

== See also ==
- Communes of the Loir-et-Cher department
