= Houssay, Loir-et-Cher =

Houssay
- Commune
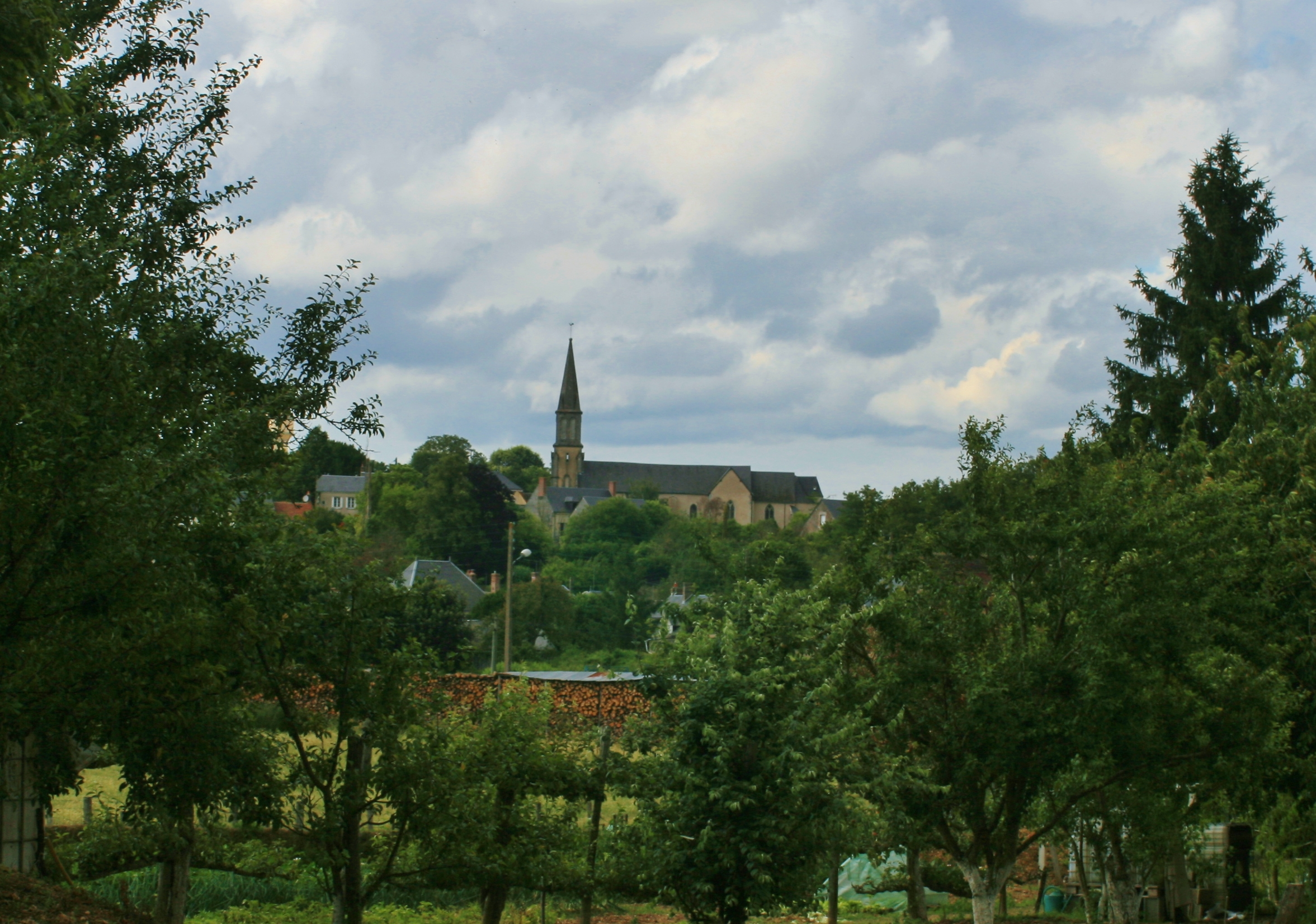

- Coat of arms
- Location of Houssay
- Location within France Location within Centre-Val de Loire
- Coordinates: 47°45′12″N 0°56′22″E
- Country: France
- Region: Centre-Val de Loire
- Department: Loir-et-Cher
- Arrondissement: Vendôme
- Canton: Montoire-sur-le-Loir
- Intercommunality: CA Territoires Vendômois

Government
  - Mayor (2020–2026): Cécilia Nauche
- Area^{1}: 16.56 km^{2} (6.39 sq mi)
- Elevation: 136 m (446 ft)
- Highest elevation: 137 m (449 ft)
- Lowest elevation: 75 m (246 ft)
- Population (2023): 365
  - Density: 22.0/km^{2} (57.1/sq mi)
- Time zone: UTC+01:00 (CET)
  - Summer (DST): UTC+02:00 (CEST)
- INSEE/Postal code: 41102 /41800
- ^{1} French Land Register data, which excludes lakes, ponds, glaciers > 1 km^{2} (0.386 sq mi or 247 acres) and river estuaries.

Houssay (French pronunciation: [usɛ]) is a commune in the Loir-et-Cher department of central France.

== Population ==
Historical population
| Year | Pop. | ±% p.a. |
|---|---|---|
| 1968 | 380 | — |
| 1975 | 364 | −0.61% |
| 1982 | 354 | −0.40% |
| 1990 | 346 | −0.29% |
| 1999 | 371 | +0.78% |
| 2007 | 368 | −0.10% |
| 2012 | 380 | +0.64% |
| 2017 | 387 | +0.37% |
| 2023 | 365 | −0.97% |
Source: INSEE

== See also ==
- Communes of the Loir-et-Cher department
