= Saint-Arnoult, Loir-et-Cher =

Saint-Arnoult
- Commune
- Coat of arms
- Location of Saint-Arnoult
- Location within France Location within Centre-Val de Loire
- Coordinates: 47°42′30″N 0°52′25″E
- Country: France
- Region: Centre-Val de Loire
- Department: Loir-et-Cher
- Arrondissement: Vendôme
- Canton: Montoire-sur-le-Loir
- Intercommunality: CA Territoires Vendômois

Government
  - Mayor (2020–2026): Laurent Gauthier
- Area^{1}: 9.57 km^{2} (3.69 sq mi)
- Elevation: 113 m (371 ft)
- Highest elevation: 152 m (499 ft)
- Lowest elevation: 85 m (279 ft)
- Population (2023): 302
  - Density: 31.6/km^{2} (81.7/sq mi)
- Time zone: UTC+01:00 (CET)
  - Summer (DST): UTC+02:00 (CEST)
- INSEE/Postal code: 41201 /41800
- ^{1} French Land Register data, which excludes lakes, ponds, glaciers > 1 km^{2} (0.386 sq mi or 247 acres) and river estuaries.

Saint-Arnoult (French pronunciation: [sɛ̃.t‿aʁnu]) is a commune in the Loir-et-Cher department, central France.

== Population ==
Historical population
| Year | Pop. | ±% p.a. |
|---|---|---|
| 1968 | 401 | — |
| 1975 | 346 | −2.09% |
| 1982 | 330 | −0.67% |
| 1990 | 303 | −1.06% |
| 1999 | 305 | +0.07% |
| 2007 | 325 | +0.80% |
| 2012 | 323 | −0.12% |
| 2017 | 321 | −0.12% |
| 2023 | 302 | −1.01% |
Source: INSEE

== See also ==
- Communes of the Loir-et-Cher department
