= Montoire-sur-le-Loir =

- Commune
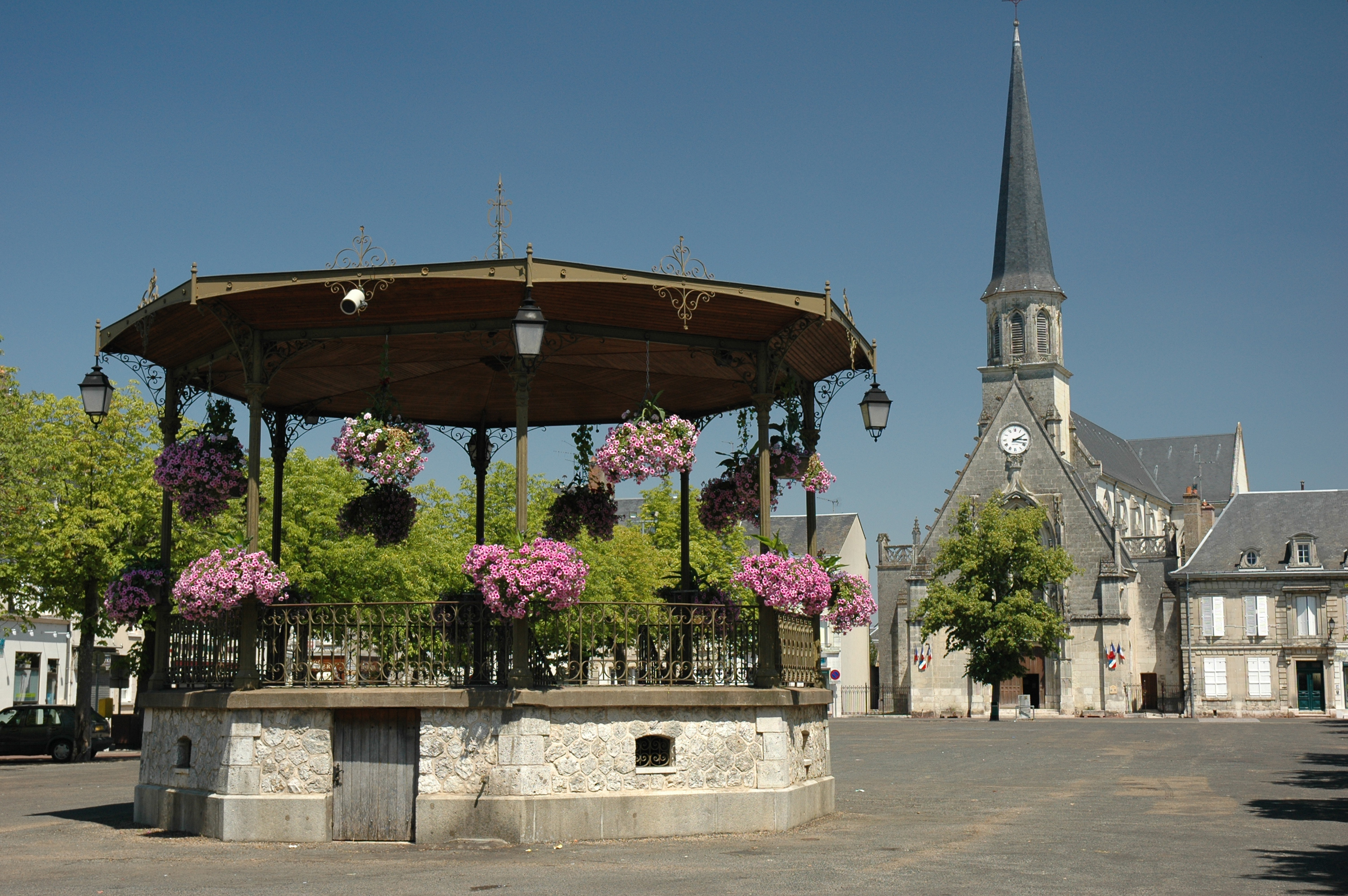
- The main square of the town

- Coat of arms
- Location of Montoire-sur-le-Loir
- Location within France Location within Centre-Val de Loire
- Coordinates: 47°45′18″N 0°51′52″E
- Country: France
- Region: Centre-Val de Loire
- Department: Loir-et-Cher
- Arrondissement: Vendôme
- Canton: Montoire-sur-le-Loir
- Intercommunality: CA Territoires Vendômois

Government
  - Mayor (2020–2026): Arnaud Tafilet
- Area^{1}: 21.02 km^{2} (8.12 sq mi)
- Elevation: 70 m (230 ft)
- Highest elevation: 146 m (479 ft)
- Lowest elevation: 60 m (200 ft)
- Population (2023): 3,646
  - Density: 173.5/km^{2} (449.2/sq mi)
- Time zone: UTC+01:00 (CET)
  - Summer (DST): UTC+02:00 (CEST)
- INSEE/Postal code: 41149 /41800
- ^{1} French Land Register data, which excludes lakes, ponds, glaciers > 1 km^{2} (0.386 sq mi or 247 acres) and river estuaries.

Montoire-sur-le-Loir (French pronunciation: [mɔ̃twaʁ syʁ lə lwaʁ], literally Montoire on the Loir), commonly known as Montoire, is a commune near Vendôme, in the Loir-et-Cher department in Centre-Val de Loire, France.

== History ==
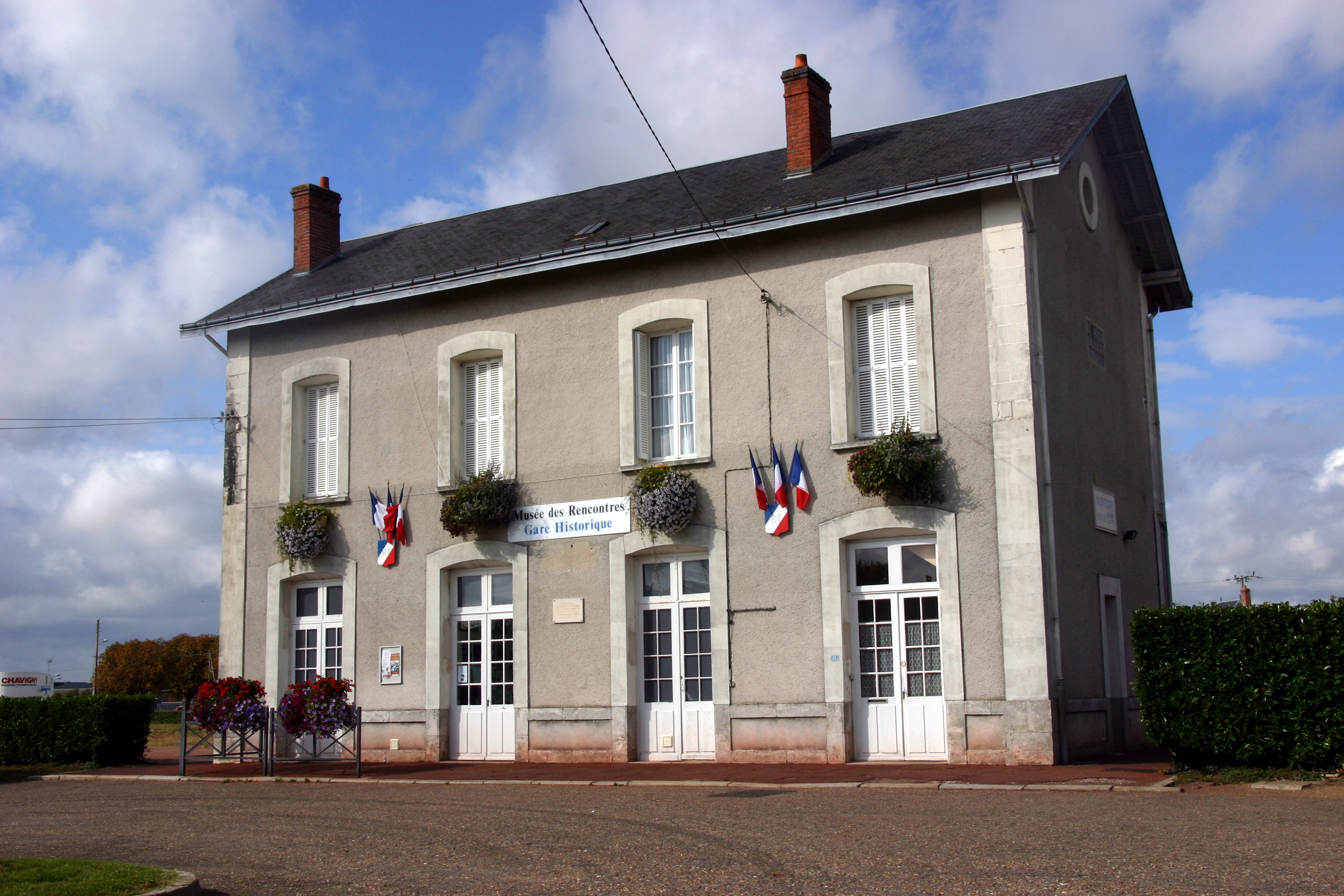
The railway station of Montoire-sur-le-Loir

Montoire-sur-le-Loir is known as the location where, on 24 October 1940, the famous handshake between Adolf Hitler and Philippe Pétain took place signifying the start of organised collaboration of Vichy France with the Nazi regime. The meeting took place in a railway car just outside the town's railway station.

The discussion was entirely a matter of generalities, with no specifics discussed or decided. Hitler was impressed with Pétain's commitment to defending the French colonial empire. False rumours abounded that France had made major concessions regarding colonies and German control of French ports and the French fleet. This was announced to the French public on 30 October in a radio broadcast speech when Pétain declared, "I enter, today, into the way of collaboration."

Two days previously, Pierre Laval had had a meeting with Hitler in the same location and suggested to Hitler that he meet with Pétain.

Montoire was chosen because of its relative isolation and also its proximity to the main Paris-Hendaye train line, Hitler having met with Franco at Hendaye on the 23rd. Besides, in case of an aerial attack, the train could have found shelter in the nearby tunnel in Saint-Rimay. Two years later German command posts were established at Saint-Rimay and Thoré-la-Rochette with direct contact to Berlin.

== Population ==
Historical population

Year	Pop.	±% p.a.
1793	2,844	—
1821	2,938	+0.12%
1846	3,051	+0.15%
1872	3,054	+0.00%
1901	3,115	+0.07%
1926	2,780	−0.45%
1946	2,908	+0.23%
1962	2,540	−0.84%
1968	3,241	+4.15%

Year	Pop.	±% p.a.
1975	3,932	+2.80%
1982	4,200	+0.95%
1990	4,065	−0.41%
1999	4,275	+0.56%
2007	4,094	−0.54%
2012	3,963	−0.65%
2017	3,782	−0.93%
2023	3,646	−0.61%

Source: EHESS and INSEE (1975–2023)

== International relations ==
Montoire-sur-le-Loir is twinned with:

- Łowicz, Poland

== See also ==
- Communes of the Loir-et-Cher department
- Bas-Vendômois
- Château de Montoire
