= Saint-Rimay =

- Commune
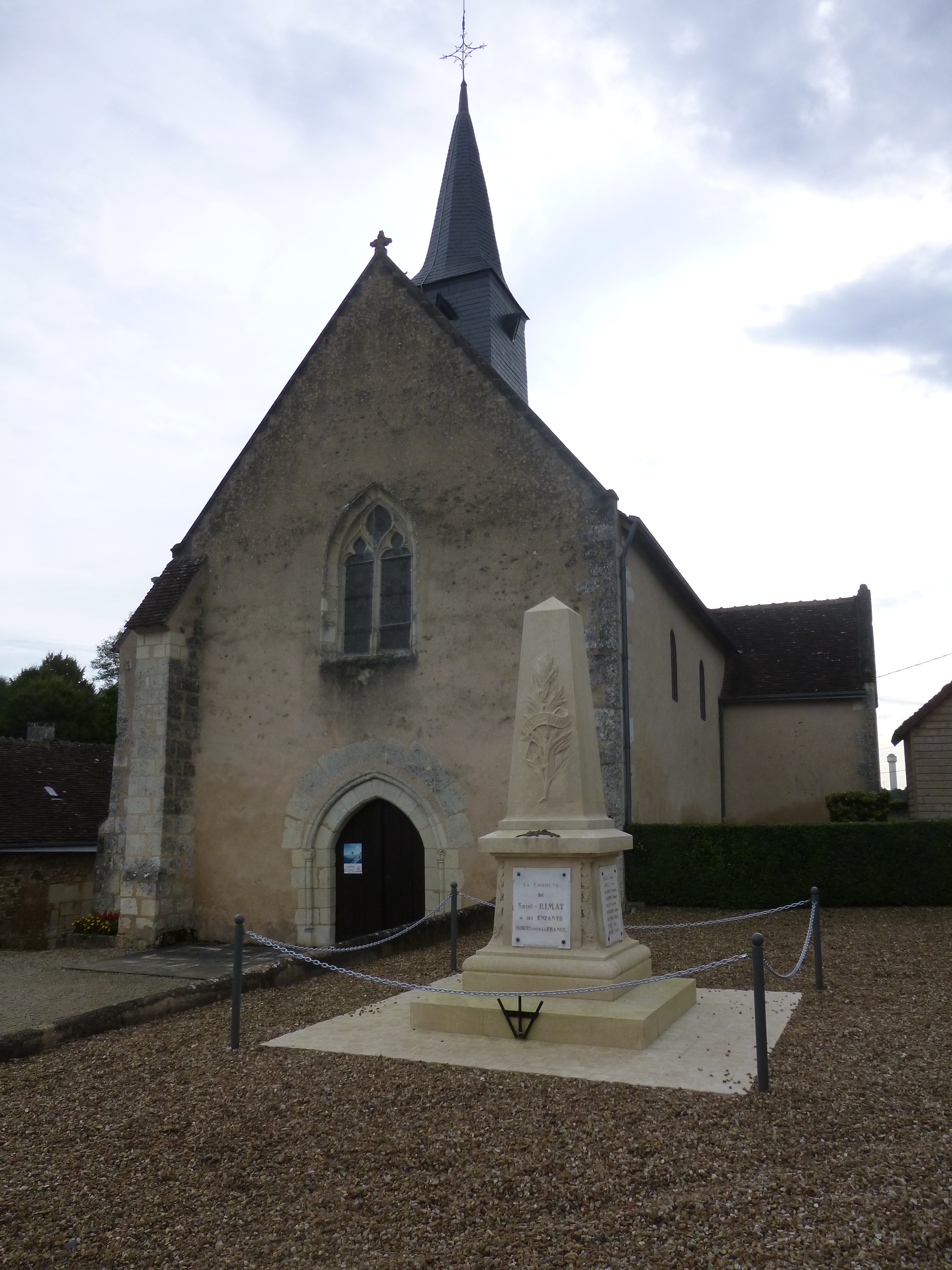

- Coat of arms
- Location of Saint-Rimay
- Location within France Location within Centre-Val de Loire
- Coordinates: 47°45′47″N 0°55′24″E
- Country: France
- Region: Centre-Val de Loire
- Department: Loir-et-Cher
- Arrondissement: Vendôme
- Canton: Montoire-sur-le-Loir
- Intercommunality: CA Territoires Vendômois

Government
  - Mayor (2020–2026): Yves Rolland
- Area^{1}: 7.36 km^{2} (2.84 sq mi)
- Elevation: 76 m (249 ft)
- Highest elevation: 125 m (410 ft)
- Lowest elevation: 65 m (213 ft)
- Population (2023): 294
  - Density: 39.9/km^{2} (103/sq mi)
- Time zone: UTC+01:00 (CET)
  - Summer (DST): UTC+02:00 (CEST)
- INSEE/Postal code: 41228 /41800
- ^{1} French Land Register data, which excludes lakes, ponds, glaciers > 1 km^{2} (0.386 sq mi or 247 acres) and river estuaries.

Saint-Rimay (French pronunciation: [sɛ̃ ʁimɛ]) is a commune in the Loir-et-Cher department of central France.

== Population ==
Historical population
Year	Pop.	±% p.a.
1968	317	—
1975	284	−1.56%
1982	292	+0.40%
1990	323	+1.27%
1999	311	−0.42%
2007	293	−0.74%
2012	288	−0.34%
2017	291	+0.21%
2023	294	+0.17%
Source: INSEE

== See also ==
- Communes of the Loir-et-Cher department
