= Binas =

Binas may refer to:

== People ==
- Alex Binas (born 1990), Greek football player

== Places ==
- Binas, Loir-et-Cher, France

== Other ==
- Binas (book), Dutch science reference work
