= Arrondissement of Blois =

Coordinates: 47.58°N 1.33°E

Blois
- Arrondissement
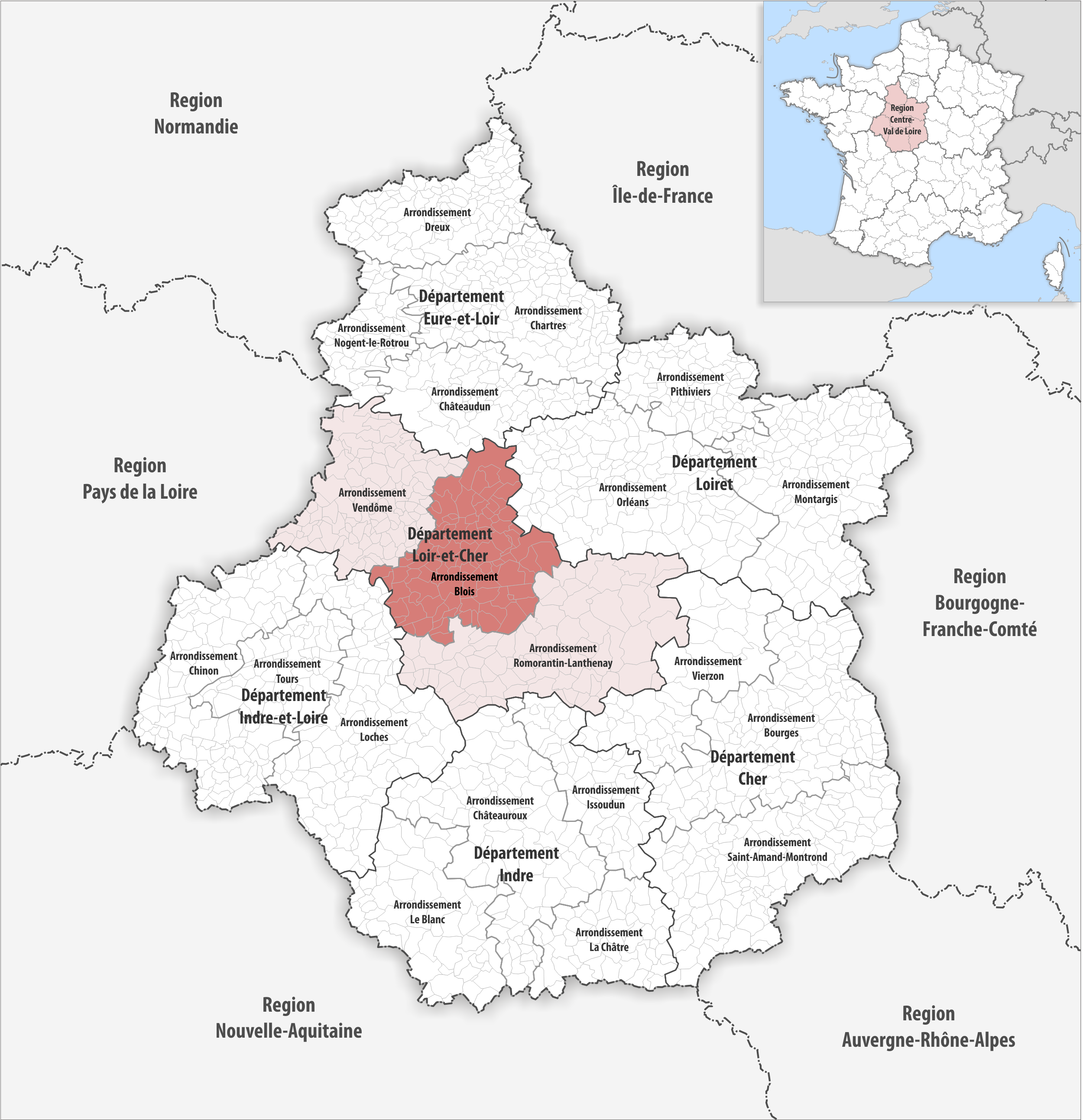
- Location within the region Centre-Val de Loire
- Country: France
- Region: Centre-Val de Loire
- Department: Loir-et-Cher
- No. of communes: {{{nbcomm}}}
- Area: 1,950.2 km^{2} (753.0 sq mi)
- Population (2023): 151,546
  - Density: 77.708/km^{2} (201.26/sq mi)
- INSEE code: 411

The arrondissement of Blois (French: arrondissement de Blois, [aʁɔ̃dismɑ̃ də blwa]) is an arrondissement (district) of France, located in the Loir-et-Cher department, Centre-Val de Loire. It has 93 communes. Its population is 151,096 (2021), and its area is 1,950.2 km^{2} (753.0 sq mi).

== Composition ==
The communes of the arrondissement of Blois are:

1. Autainville (41006)
2. Avaray (41008)
3. Averdon (41009)
4. Bauzy (41013)
5. Beauce-la-Romaine (41173)
6. Binas (41017)
7. Blois (41018)
8. Boisseau (41019)
9. Bracieux (41025)
10. Briou (41027)
11. Candé-sur-Beuvron (41029)
12. Cellettes (41031)
13. Chailles (41032)
14. Chambord (41034)
15. Champigny-en-Beauce (41035)
16. La Chapelle-Saint-Martin-en-Plaine (41039)
17. La Chapelle-Vendômoise (41040)
18. Chaumont-sur-Loire (41045)
19. La Chaussée-Saint-Victor (41047)
20. Cheverny (41050)
21. Chitenay (41052)
22. Conan (41057)
23. Concriers (41058)
24. Cormeray (41061)
25. Courbouzon (41066)
26. Cour-Cheverny (41067)
27. Cour-sur-Loire (41069)
28. Crouy-sur-Cosson (41071)
29. Épiais (41077)
30. La Ferté-Saint-Cyr (41085)
31. Fontaines-en-Sologne (41086)
32. Fossé (41091)
33. Françay (41093)
34. Herbault (41101)
35. Huisseau-sur-Cosson (41104)
36. Josnes (41105)
37. Lancôme (41108)
38. Landes-le-Gaulois (41109)
39. Lestiou (41114)
40. Lorges (41119)
41. La Madeleine-Villefrouin (41121)
42. Marchenoir (41123)
43. Marolles (41128)
44. Maslives (41129)
45. Maves (41130)
46. Menars (41134)
47. Mer (41136)
48. Mesland (41137)
49. Monteaux (41144)
50. Monthou-sur-Bièvre (41145)
51. Les Montils (41147)
52. Montlivault (41148)
53. Mont-près-Chambord (41150)
54. Muides-sur-Loire (41155)
55. Mulsans (41156)
56. Neuvy (41160)
57. Oucques la Nouvelle (41171)
58. Le Plessis-l'Échelle (41178)
59. Rhodon (41188)
60. Rilly-sur-Loire (41189)
61. Roches (41191)
62. Saint-Bohaire (41203)
63. Saint-Claude-de-Diray (41204)
64. Saint-Cyr-du-Gault (41205)
65. Saint-Denis-sur-Loire (41206)
66. Saint-Dyé-sur-Loire (41207)
67. Saint-Étienne-des-Guérets (41208)
68. Saint-Gervais-la-Forêt (41212)
69. Saint-Laurent-des-Bois (41219)
70. Saint-Laurent-Nouan (41220)
71. Saint-Léonard-en-Beauce (41221)
72. Saint-Lubin-en-Vergonnois (41223)
73. Saint-Sulpice-de-Pommeray (41230)
74. Sambin (41233)
75. Santenay (41234)
76. Séris (41245)
77. Seur (41246)
78. Suèvres (41252)
79. Talcy (41253)
80. Thoury (41260)
81. Tour-en-Sologne (41262)
82. Valaire (41266)
83. Valencisse (41142)
84. Valloire-sur-Cisse (41055)
85. Veuzain-sur-Loire (41167)
86. Vievy-le-Rayé (41273)
87. Villebarou (41276)
88. Villefrancœur (41281)
89. Villeneuve-Frouville (41284)
90. Villerbon (41288)
91. Villermain (41289)
92. Villexanton (41292)
93. Vineuil (41295)

== History ==
The arrondissement of Blois was created in 1800. In 2007 it lost the canton of Saint-Aignan to the arrondissement of Romorantin-Lanthenay. At the January 2017 reorganisation of the arrondissements of Loir-et-Cher, it gained three communes from the arrondissement of Romorantin-Lanthenay and four communes from the arrondissement of Vendôme, and it lost 17 communes to the arrondissement of Romorantin-Lanthenay and two communes to the arrondissement of Vendôme. In January 2019 it lost the commune Courmemin to the arrondissement of Romorantin-Lanthenay.

As a result of the reorganisation of the cantons of France which came into effect in 2015, the borders of the cantons are no longer related to the borders of the arrondissements. The cantons of the arrondissement of Blois were, as of January 2015:

1. Blois-1
2. Blois-2
3. Blois-3
4. Blois-4
5. Blois-5
6. Bracieux
7. Contres
8. Herbault
9. Marchenoir
10. Mer
11. Montrichard
12. Ouzouer-le-Marché
13. Vineuil
