= Murder of Inass Touloub =

1987 child murder in France solved in 2018

The murder of Inass Touloub, also known as the Little Martyrdom of the A10, is an iconic French criminal case that remained unsolved for more than 30 years. It concerns the murder of a 4-year-old girl, found dead in 1987 along the A10 motorway, in Suèvres (Loir-et-Cher), and whose identity was only established in 2018 thanks to DNA analyzes.

Several investigating judges and other magistrates succeeded one another during this 31-year-long investigation, and the trial took place in November 2026, condemning his father and mother.

== Discovering the body ==
On August 11, 1987, the body of a little girl is discovered by employees of the Cofiroute company, who think they see a "package", in a ditch alongside the A10 motorway, at kilometer 135 on the axis linking Orléans to Blois, in the territory of the commune of Suèvres in Loir-et-Cher.

The child, aged approximately 4 years, dressed in panties, an undershirt and a dressing gown, was found wrapped in a blanket. She was 95 cm tall, had curly brown hair and dark brown eyes. The body bore numerous signs of violence: burns from an iron, human bites (approximately twenty, notably on the chest, some mutilating), contusions due to blows (slaps, punches, kicks), untreated fractures of various dates and locations, old scars on the neck and perineum, the violence of some blows had caused bruising on internal organs.

== Verdict ==
On November 16, 2026, the prosecution requested a sentence of twenty years' imprisonment with a ten-year minimum security period for Inass's mother. For the father, they sought fourteen years' imprisonment, including a seven-year minimum security period. Since the events took place in 1987, the law required the application of the sentencing regulations in force at the time. As diminished responsibility was taken into account for the mother, her sentence was reduced to a maximum of twenty years' imprisonment. The prosecution limited its request concerning the father, considering that it could not seek a harsher sentence than that of the primary perpetrator of the violence.
