= Saint-Laurent-des-Bois =

Saint-Laurent-des-Bois may refer to the following places in France:

- Saint-Laurent-des-Bois, Eure, a commune in the Eure department
- Saint-Laurent-des-Bois, Loir-et-Cher, a commune in the Loir-et-Cher department
