= Briou =

- Commune
- Location of Briou
- Location within France Location within Centre-Val de Loire
- Coordinates: 47°48′50″N 1°28′44″E
- Country: France
- Region: Centre-Val de Loire
- Department: Loir-et-Cher
- Arrondissement: Blois
- Canton: La Beauce

Government
  - Mayor (2020–2026): Catherine Boquet-Massin
- Area^{1}: 10.17 km^{2} (3.93 sq mi)
- Elevation: 128 m (420 ft)
- Highest elevation: 148 m (486 ft)
- Lowest elevation: 116 m (381 ft)
- Population (2023): 143
  - Density: 14.1/km^{2} (36.4/sq mi)
- Time zone: UTC+01:00 (CET)
  - Summer (DST): UTC+02:00 (CEST)
- INSEE/Postal code: 41027 /41370
- ^{1} French Land Register data, which excludes lakes, ponds, glaciers > 1 km^{2} (0.386 sq mi or 247 acres) and river estuaries.

Briou (French pronunciation: [bʁiju]) is a commune in the Loir-et-Cher department in central France.

== Population ==
Historical population
Year	Pop.	±% p.a.
1968	110	—
1975	101	−1.21%
1982	104	+0.42%
1990	111	+0.82%
1999	101	−1.04%
2007	111	+1.19%
2012	134	+3.84%
2017	147	+1.87%
2023	143	−0.46%
Source: INSEE

== See also ==
- Communes of the Loir-et-Cher department
