= Villermain =

- Commune
- Location of Villermain
- Location within France Location within Centre-Val de Loire
- Coordinates: 47°51′47″N 1°31′51″E
- Country: France
- Region: Centre-Val de Loire
- Department: Loir-et-Cher
- Arrondissement: Blois
- Canton: La Beauce
- Intercommunality: Terres du Val de Loire

Government
  - Mayor (2020–2026): Arnold Neuhaus
- Area^{1}: 28.75 km^{2} (11.10 sq mi)
- Elevation: 127 m (417 ft)
- Highest elevation: 143 m (469 ft)
- Lowest elevation: 112 m (367 ft)
- Population (2023): 390
  - Density: 14/km^{2} (35/sq mi)
- Time zone: UTC+01:00 (CET)
  - Summer (DST): UTC+02:00 (CEST)
- INSEE/Postal code: 41289 /41240
- ^{1} French Land Register data, which excludes lakes, ponds, glaciers > 1 km^{2} (0.386 sq mi or 247 acres) and river estuaries.

Villermain (French pronunciation: [vilɛʁmɛ̃]) is a commune in the Loir-et-Cher department in central France.

== Population ==
Historical population
Year	Pop.	±% p.a.
1968	367	—
1975	326	−1.68%
1982	275	−2.40%
1990	250	−1.18%
1999	285	+1.47%
2007	309	+1.02%
2012	372	+3.78%
2017	398	+1.36%
2023	390	−0.34%
Source: INSEE

== See also ==
- Communes of the Loir-et-Cher department
