= Cour-sur-Loire =

- Commune
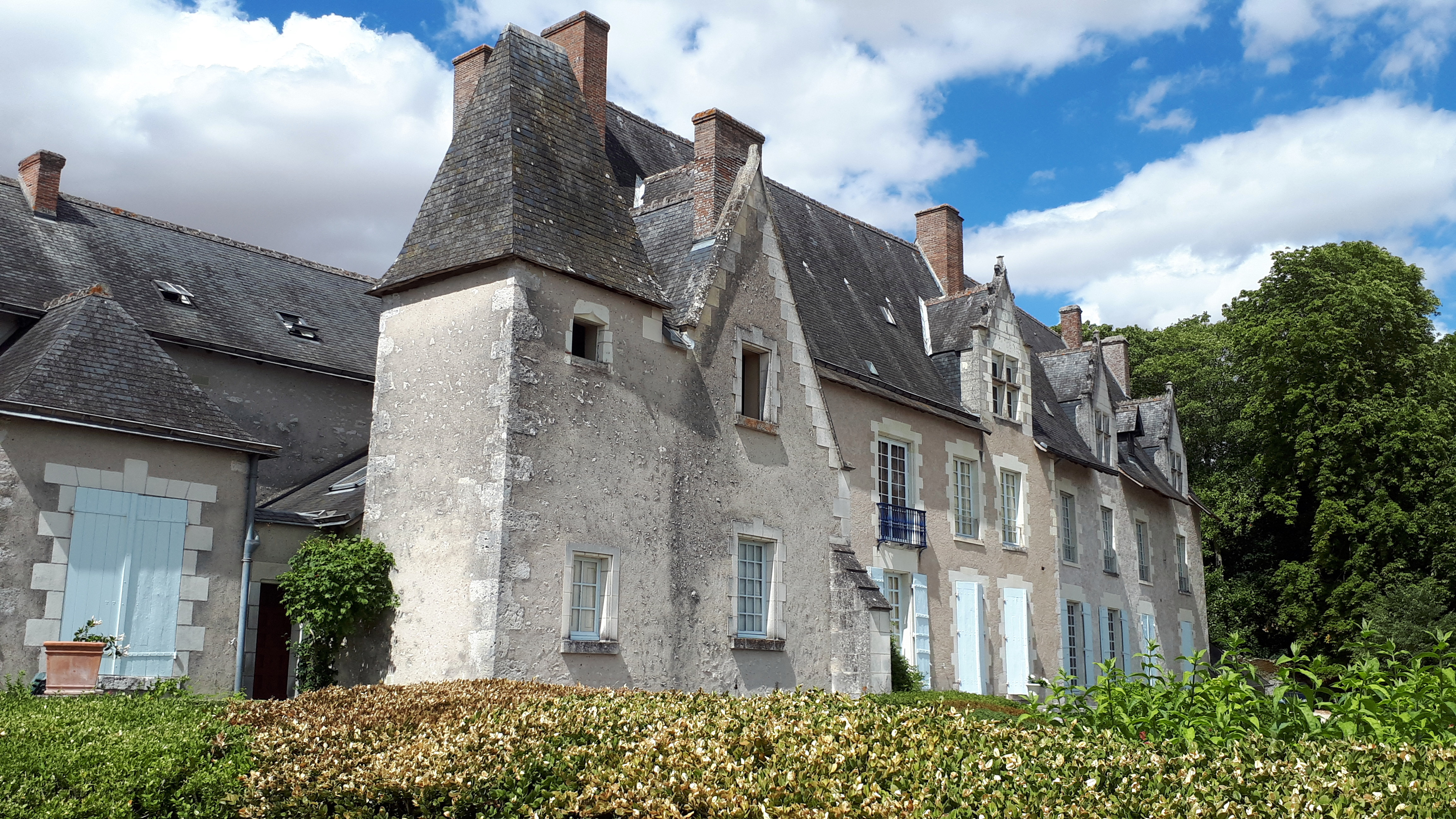
- Château de Cour-sur-Loire

- Coat of arms
- Location of Cour-sur-Loire
- Location within France Location within Centre-Val de Loire
- Coordinates: 47°39′05″N 1°25′28″E
- Country: France
- Region: Centre-Val de Loire
- Department: Loir-et-Cher
- Arrondissement: Blois
- Canton: La Beauce
- Intercommunality: Beauce Val de Loire

Government
  - Mayor (2020–2026): Annie Goncalves
- Area^{1}: 5.4 km^{2} (2.1 sq mi)
- Elevation: 85 m (279 ft)
- Highest elevation: 115 m (377 ft)
- Lowest elevation: 67 m (220 ft)
- Population (2023): 259
  - Density: 48/km^{2} (120/sq mi)
- Time zone: UTC+01:00 (CET)
  - Summer (DST): UTC+02:00 (CEST)
- INSEE/Postal code: 41069 /41500
- ^{1} French Land Register data, which excludes lakes, ponds, glaciers > 1 km^{2} (0.386 sq mi or 247 acres) and river estuaries.

Cour-sur-Loire (French pronunciation: [kuʁ syʁ lwaʁ], literally Cour on Loire) is a commune in the Loir-et-Cher department in central France.

== Population ==
Historical population
Year	Pop.	±% p.a.
1968	240	—
1975	279	+2.17%
1982	293	+0.70%
1990	289	−0.17%
1999	307	+0.67%
2007	283	−1.01%
2012	280	−0.21%
2017	266	−1.02%
2023	259	−0.44%
Source: INSEE

== See also ==
- Communes of the Loir-et-Cher department
