= Lorges =

- Commune
- Coat of arms
- Location of Lorges
- Location within France Location within Centre-Val de Loire
- Coordinates: 47°49′28″N 1°29′57″E
- Country: France
- Region: Centre-Val de Loire
- Department: Loir-et-Cher
- Arrondissement: Blois
- Canton: La Beauce
- Intercommunality: Beauce Val de Loire

Government
  - Mayor (2020–2026): Bruno Denis
- Area^{1}: 13.52 km^{2} (5.22 sq mi)
- Elevation: 132 m (433 ft)
- Highest elevation: 146 m (479 ft)
- Lowest elevation: 115 m (377 ft)
- Population (2023): 359
  - Density: 26.6/km^{2} (68.8/sq mi)
- Time zone: UTC+01:00 (CET)
  - Summer (DST): UTC+02:00 (CEST)
- INSEE/Postal code: 41119 /41370
- ^{1} French Land Register data, which excludes lakes, ponds, glaciers > 1 km^{2} (0.386 sq mi or 247 acres) and river estuaries.

Lorges (French pronunciation: [lɔʁʒ]) is a commune in the Loir-et-Cher department of central France.

== Population ==
Historical population
Year	Pop.	±% p.a.
1968	271	—
1975	231	−2.26%
1982	212	−1.22%
1990	273	+3.21%
1999	289	+0.63%
2007	339	+2.01%
2012	370	+1.77%
2017	352	−0.99%
2023	359	+0.33%
Source: INSEE

== See also ==
- Communes of the Loir-et-Cher department
