= Cormeray =

- Commune
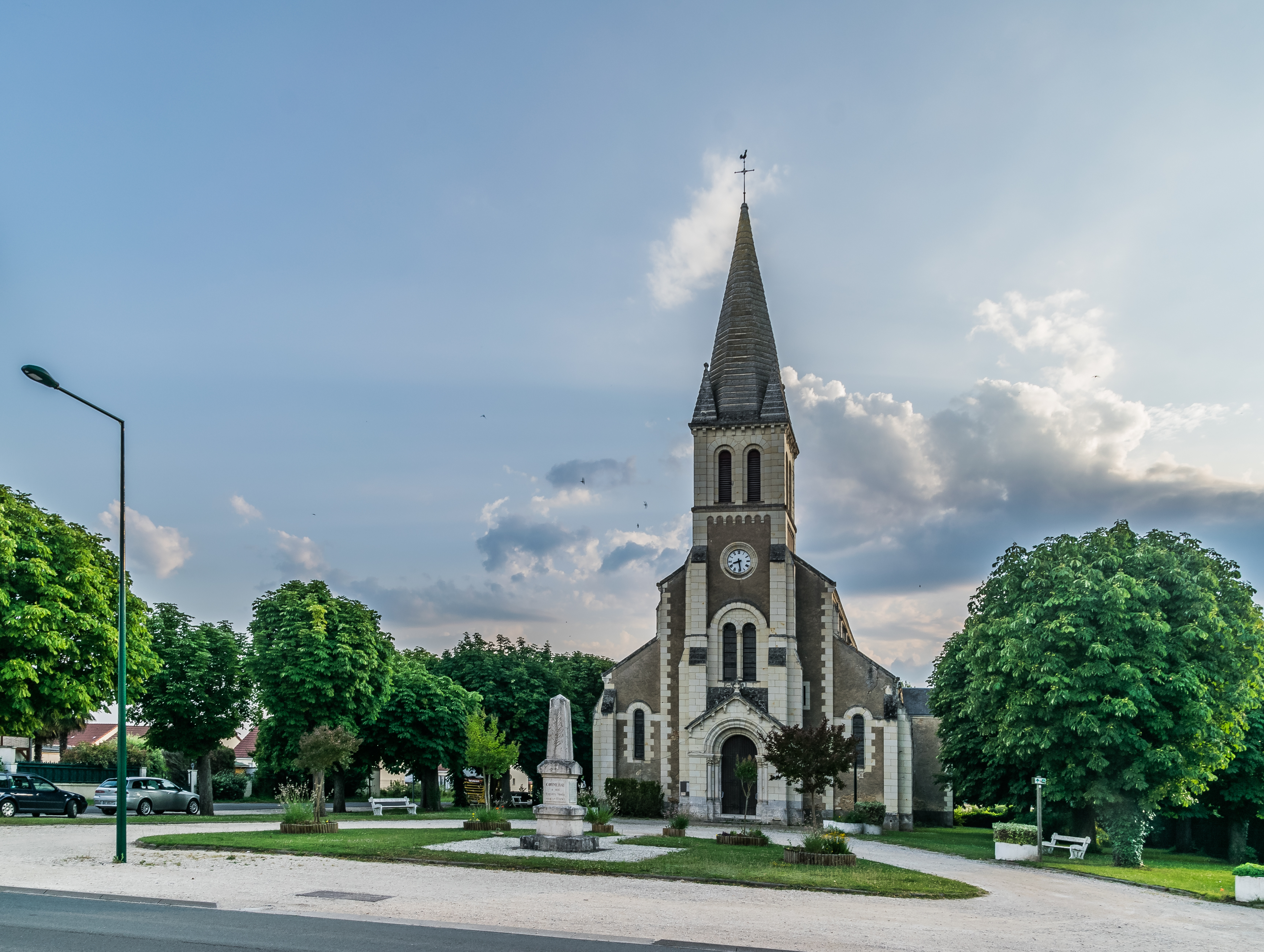

- Coat of arms
- Location of Cormeray
- Location within France Location within Centre-Val de Loire
- Coordinates: 47°29′28″N 1°24′26″E
- Country: France
- Region: Centre-Val de Loire
- Department: Loir-et-Cher
- Arrondissement: Blois
- Canton: Vineuil
- Intercommunality: CA Blois Agglopolys

Government
  - Mayor (2020–2026): Joël Pasquet
- Area^{1}: 10.31 km^{2} (3.98 sq mi)
- Elevation: 106 m (348 ft)
- Highest elevation: 109 m (358 ft)
- Lowest elevation: 91 m (299 ft)
- Population (2023): 1,558
  - Density: 151.1/km^{2} (391.4/sq mi)
- Time zone: UTC+01:00 (CET)
  - Summer (DST): UTC+02:00 (CEST)
- INSEE/Postal code: 41061 /41120
- ^{1} French Land Register data, which excludes lakes, ponds, glaciers > 1 km^{2} (0.386 sq mi or 247 acres) and river estuaries.

Cormeray (French pronunciation: [kɔʁməʁɛ]) is a commune in the Loir-et-Cher department of central France.

== Population ==
Historical population
Year	Pop.	±% p.a.
1968	650	—
1975	524	−3.03%
1982	781	+5.87%
1990	917	+2.03%
1999	1,038	+1.39%
2007	1,357	+3.41%
2012	1,556	+2.77%
2017	1,560	+0.05%
2023	1,558	−0.02%
Source: INSEE

== See also ==
- Communes of the Loir-et-Cher department
