= Monthou-sur-Bièvre =

- Commune
- Location of Monthou-sur-Bièvre
- Location within France Location within Centre-Val de Loire
- Coordinates: 47°28′37″N 1°17′45″E
- Country: France
- Region: Centre-Val de Loire
- Department: Loir-et-Cher
- Arrondissement: Blois
- Canton: Blois-3
- Intercommunality: CA Blois Agglopolys

Government
  - Mayor (2020–2026): Pierre Wardega
- Area^{1}: 16.62 km^{2} (6.42 sq mi)
- Elevation: 99 m (325 ft)
- Highest elevation: 113 m (371 ft)
- Lowest elevation: 62 m (203 ft)
- Population (2023): 793
  - Density: 47.7/km^{2} (124/sq mi)
- Time zone: UTC+01:00 (CET)
  - Summer (DST): UTC+02:00 (CEST)
- INSEE/Postal code: 41145 /41120
- ^{1} French Land Register data, which excludes lakes, ponds, glaciers > 1 km^{2} (0.386 sq mi or 247 acres) and river estuaries.

Monthou-sur-Bièvre (French pronunciation: [mɔ̃tu syʁ bjɛvʁ]) is a commune in the Loir-et-Cher department of central France.

== Population ==
Historical population
Year	Pop.	±% p.a.
1968	399	—
1975	320	−3.10%
1982	423	+4.07%
1990	502	+2.16%
1999	505	+0.07%
2007	692	+4.02%
2012	793	+2.76%
2017	811	+0.45%
2023	793	−0.37%
Source: INSEE

== See also ==
- Communes of the Loir-et-Cher department
