= Courbouzon, Loir-et-Cher =

Courbouzon
- Commune
- Location of Courbouzon
- Location within France Location within Centre-Val de Loire
- Coordinates: 47°42′56″N 1°32′40″E
- Country: France
- Region: Centre-Val de Loire
- Department: Loir-et-Cher
- Arrondissement: Blois
- Canton: La Beauce

Government
  - Mayor (2023–2026): Laurent Foucher
- Area^{1}: 6.41 km^{2} (2.47 sq mi)
- Elevation: 103 m (338 ft)
- Highest elevation: 116 m (381 ft)
- Lowest elevation: 72 m (236 ft)
- Population (2023): 420
  - Density: 66/km^{2} (170/sq mi)
- Time zone: UTC+01:00 (CET)
  - Summer (DST): UTC+02:00 (CEST)
- INSEE/Postal code: 41066 /41500
- ^{1} French Land Register data, which excludes lakes, ponds, glaciers > 1 km^{2} (0.386 sq mi or 247 acres) and river estuaries.

Courbouzon (French pronunciation: [kuʁbuzɔ̃]) is a commune in the Loir-et-Cher department of central France.

== Population ==
Historical population
Year	Pop.	±% p.a.
1968	354	—
1975	327	−1.13%
1982	307	−0.90%
1990	316	+0.36%
1999	390	+2.37%
2007	470	+2.36%
2012	430	−1.76%
2017	435	+0.23%
2023	420	−0.58%
Source: INSEE

== See also ==
- Communes of the Loir-et-Cher department
