= La Chapelle-Saint-Martin-en-Plaine =

- Commune
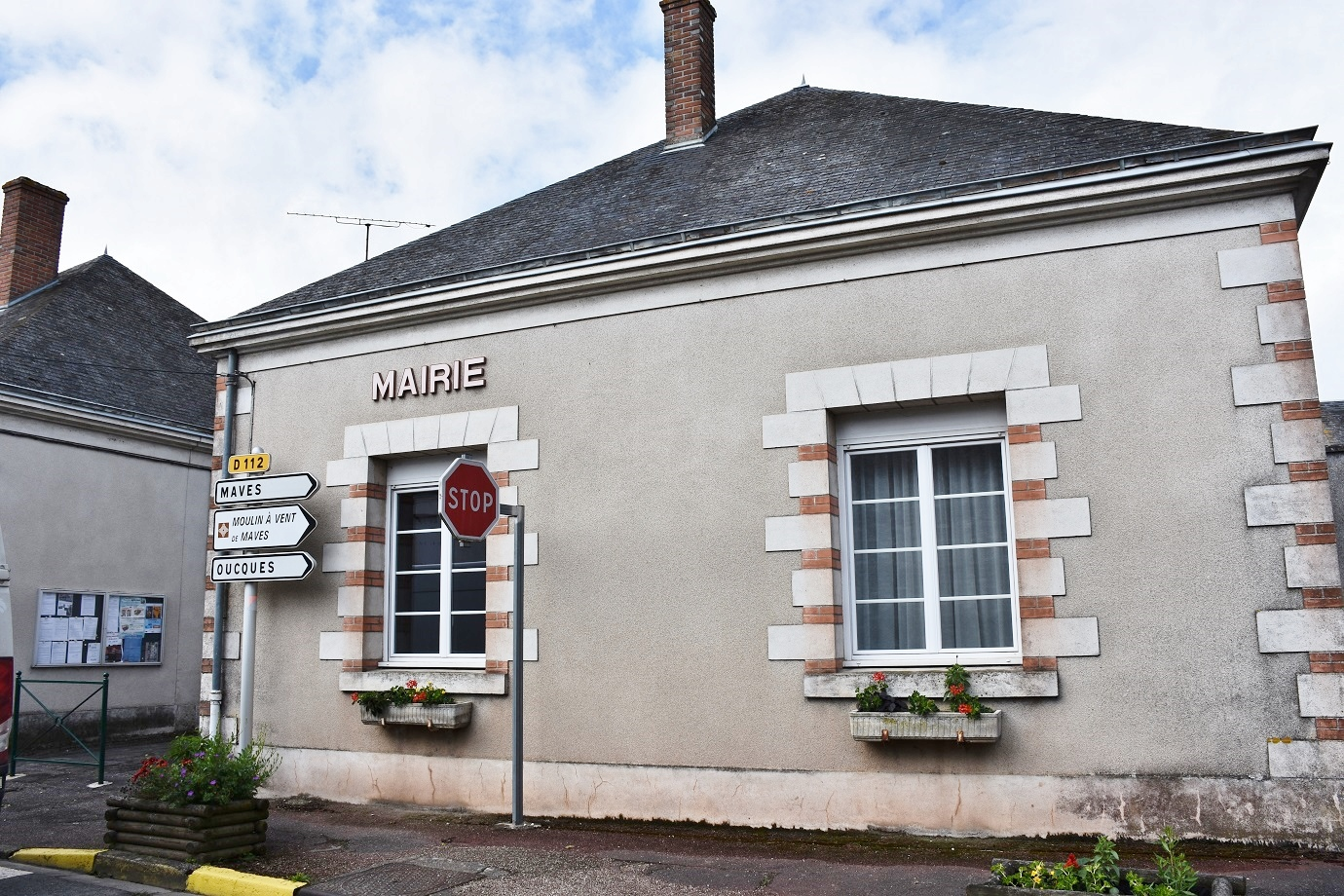
- Town hall
- Location of La Chapelle-Saint-Martin-en-Plaine
- Location within France Location within Centre-Val de Loire
- Coordinates: 47°43′05″N 1°25′03″E
- Country: France
- Region: Centre-Val de Loire
- Department: Loir-et-Cher
- Arrondissement: Blois
- Canton: La Beauce
- Intercommunality: Beauce Val de Loire

Government
  - Mayor (2025–2026): Sandrine Brindeau
- Area^{1}: 22.83 km^{2} (8.81 sq mi)
- Elevation: 121 m (397 ft)
- Highest elevation: 124 m (407 ft)
- Lowest elevation: 104 m (341 ft)
- Population (2023): 687
  - Density: 30.1/km^{2} (77.9/sq mi)
- Time zone: UTC+01:00 (CET)
  - Summer (DST): UTC+02:00 (CEST)
- INSEE/Postal code: 41039 /41500
- ^{1} French Land Register data, which excludes lakes, ponds, glaciers > 1 km^{2} (0.386 sq mi or 247 acres) and river estuaries.

La Chapelle-Saint-Martin-en-Plaine (French pronunciation: [la ʃapɛl sɛ̃ maʁtɛ̃ ɑ̃ plɛn]) is a commune in the Loir-et-Cher department in central France.

== Population ==
Historical population
Year	Pop.	±% p.a.
1968	621	—
1975	606	−0.35%
1982	590	−0.38%
1990	552	−0.83%
1999	591	+0.76%
2007	610	+0.40%
2012	733	+3.74%
2017	730	−0.08%
2023	687	−1.01%
Source: INSEE

== See also ==
- Communes of the Loir-et-Cher department
