= Concriers =

- Commune
- Location of Concriers
- Location within France Location within Centre-Val de Loire
- Coordinates: 47°46′20″N 1°28′31″E
- Country: France
- Region: Centre-Val de Loire
- Department: Loir-et-Cher
- Arrondissement: Blois
- Canton: La Beauce
- Intercommunality: Beauce Val de Loire

Government
  - Mayor (2020–2026): Pascal Huguet
- Area^{1}: 4.84 km^{2} (1.87 sq mi)
- Elevation: 120 m (390 ft)
- Highest elevation: 124 m (407 ft)
- Lowest elevation: 107 m (351 ft)
- Population (2023): 184
  - Density: 38.0/km^{2} (98.5/sq mi)
- Time zone: UTC+01:00 (CET)
  - Summer (DST): UTC+02:00 (CEST)
- INSEE/Postal code: 41058 /41370
- ^{1} French Land Register data, which excludes lakes, ponds, glaciers > 1 km^{2} (0.386 sq mi or 247 acres) and river estuaries.

Concriers (French pronunciation: [kɔ̃kʁije]) is a commune in the Loir-et-Cher department of central France.

== Population ==
Historical population
Year	Pop.	±% p.a.
1968	161	—
1975	143	−1.68%
1982	128	−1.57%
1990	138	+0.94%
1999	145	+0.55%
2007	157	+1.00%
2012	161	+0.50%
2017	176	+1.80%
2023	184	+0.74%
Source: INSEE

== See also ==
- Communes of the Loir-et-Cher department
