= Villexanton =

- Commune
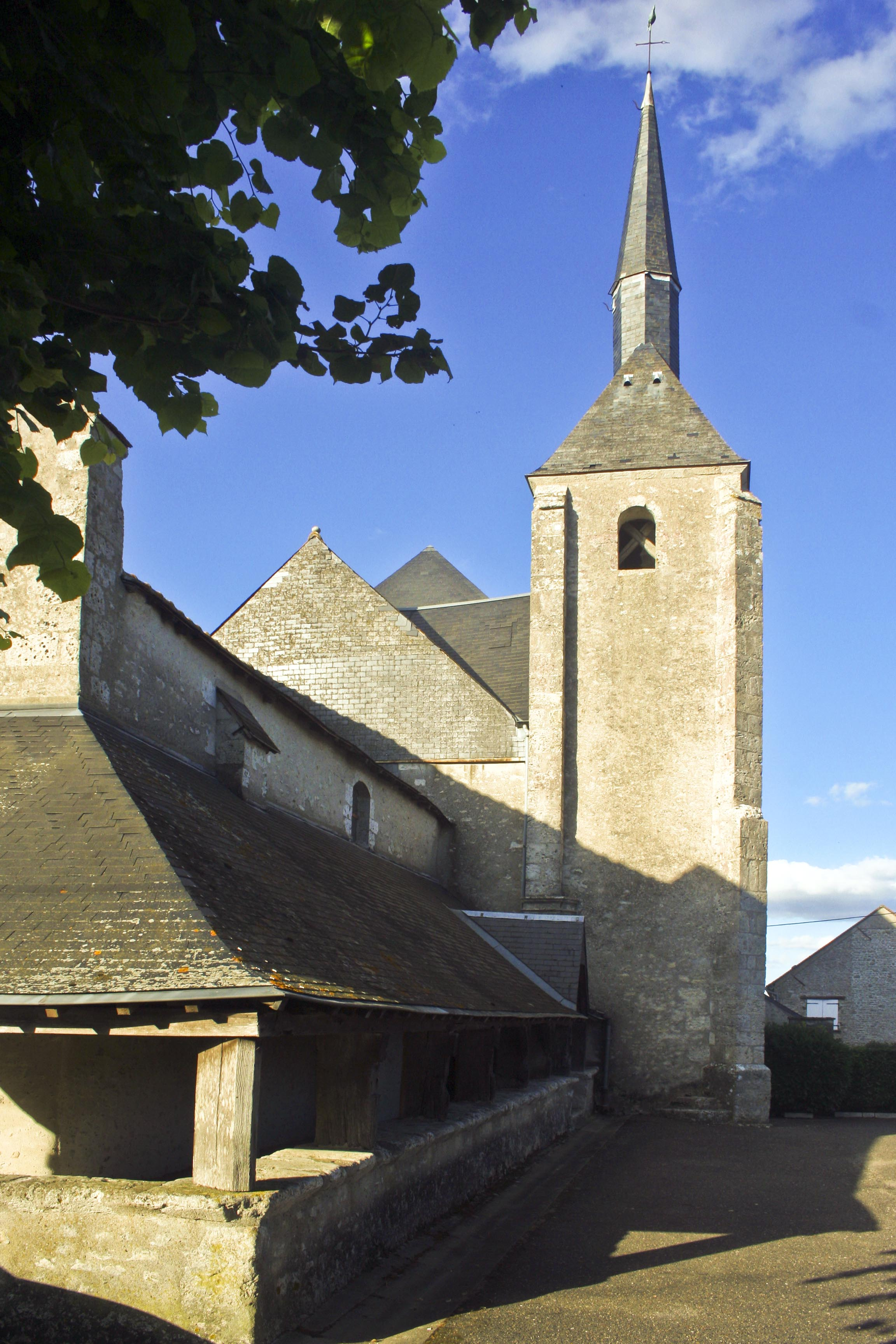
- Location of Villexanton
- Location within France Location within Centre-Val de Loire
- Coordinates: 47°44′32″N 1°25′23″E
- Country: France
- Region: Centre-Val de Loire
- Department: Loir-et-Cher
- Arrondissement: Blois
- Canton: La Beauce

Government
  - Mayor (2020–2026): Guy Terrier
- Area^{1}: 11.53 km^{2} (4.45 sq mi)
- Elevation: 160 m (520 ft)
- Highest elevation: 124 m (407 ft)
- Lowest elevation: 104 m (341 ft)
- Population (2023): 198
  - Density: 17.2/km^{2} (44.5/sq mi)
- Time zone: UTC+01:00 (CET)
  - Summer (DST): UTC+02:00 (CEST)
- INSEE/Postal code: 41292 /41500
- ^{1} French Land Register data, which excludes lakes, ponds, glaciers > 1 km^{2} (0.386 sq mi or 247 acres) and river estuaries.

Villexanton is a commune in the Loir-et-Cher department in central France.

== Population ==
Historical population
Year	Pop.	±% p.a.
1968	215	—
1975	180	−2.51%
1982	181	+0.08%
1990	162	−1.38%
1999	198	+2.25%
2007	208	+0.62%
2012	187	−2.11%
2017	201	+1.45%
2023	198	−0.25%
Source: INSEE

== See also ==
- Communes of the Loir-et-Cher department
