= Le Plessis-l'Échelle =

- Location of Le Plessis-l'Échelle
- Location within France Location within Centre-Val de Loire
- Coordinates: 47°48′52″N 1°25′48″E
- Country: France
- Region: Centre-Val de Loire
- Department: Loir-et-Cher
- Arrondissement: Blois
- Canton: La Beauce
- Intercommunality: Beauce Val de Loire

Government
  - Mayor (2020–2026): Jean-Luc Dumoulin
- Area^{1}: 11.7 km^{2} (4.5 sq mi)
- Elevation: 120 m (390 ft)
- Highest elevation: 147 m (482 ft)
- Lowest elevation: 111 m (364 ft)
- Population (2023): 57
  - Density: 4.9/km^{2} (13/sq mi)
- Time zone: UTC+01:00 (CET)
  - Summer (DST): UTC+02:00 (CEST)
- INSEE/Postal code: 41178 /41370
- ^{1} French Land Register data, which excludes lakes, ponds, glaciers > 1 km^{2} (0.386 sq mi or 247 acres) and river estuaries.

Le Plessis-l'Échelle (French pronunciation: [lə plɛsi leʃɛl]) is a commune in the Loir-et-Cher department of central France.

== Population ==
Historical population
Year	Pop.	±% p.a.
1968	113	—
1975	81	−4.64%
1982	67	−2.67%
1990	63	−0.77%
1999	65	+0.35%
2007	69	+0.75%
2012	75	+1.68%
2017	70	−1.37%
2023	57	−3.37%
Source: INSEE

== See also ==
- Communes of the Loir-et-Cher department
