= Saint-Léonard-en-Beauce =

- Commune
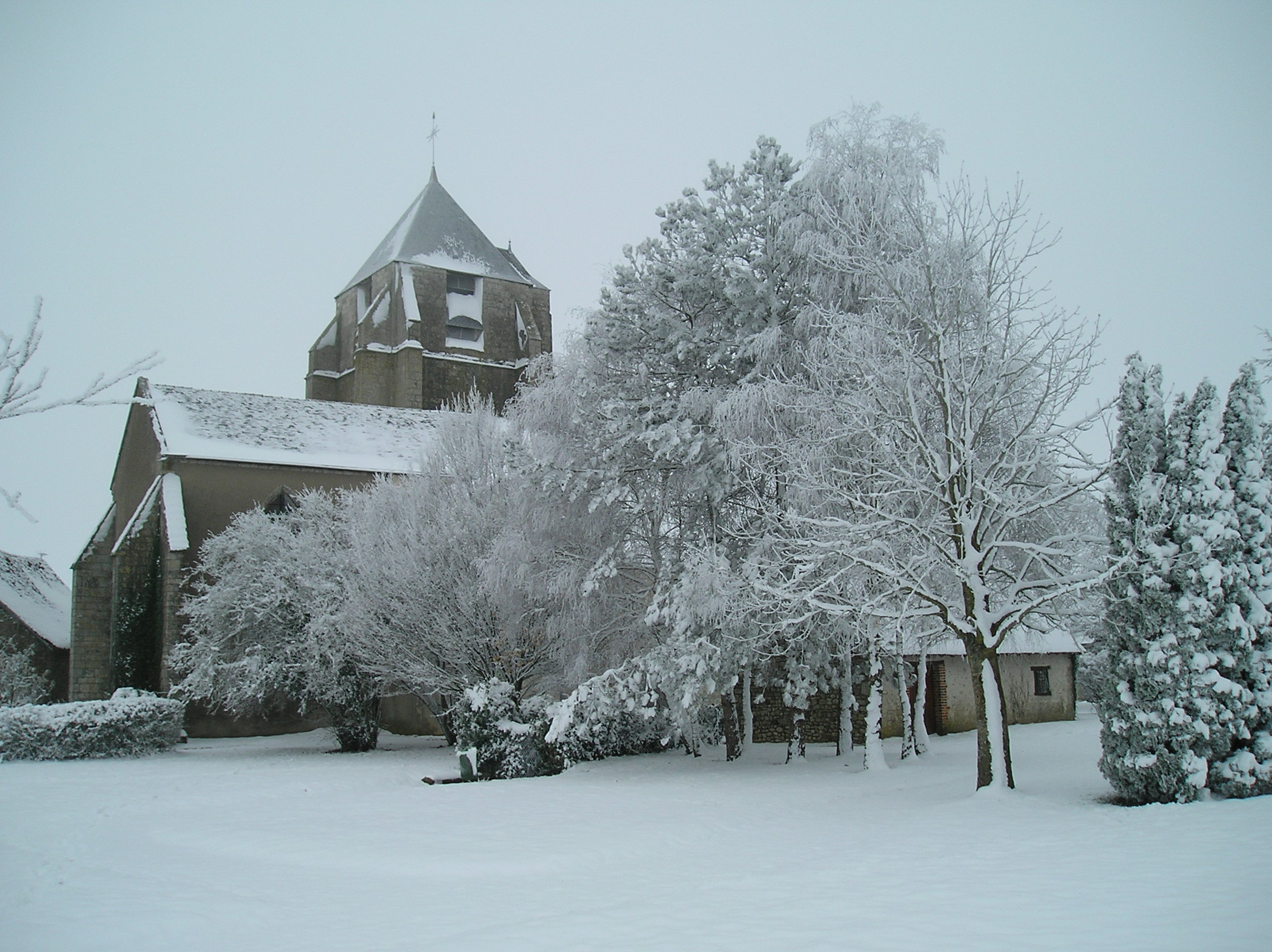

- Coat of arms
- Location of Saint-Léonard-en-Beauce
- Location within France Location within Centre-Val de Loire
- Coordinates: 47°49′53″N 1°22′53″E
- Country: France
- Region: Centre-Val de Loire
- Department: Loir-et-Cher
- Arrondissement: Blois
- Canton: La Beauce
- Intercommunality: Beauce Val de Loire

Government
  - Mayor (2020–2026): Yves Chantereau
- Area^{1}: 40.66 km^{2} (15.70 sq mi)
- Elevation: 145 m (476 ft)
- Highest elevation: 152 m (499 ft)
- Lowest elevation: 113 m (371 ft)
- Population (2023): 634
  - Density: 15.6/km^{2} (40.4/sq mi)
- Time zone: UTC+01:00 (CET)
  - Summer (DST): UTC+02:00 (CEST)
- INSEE/Postal code: 41221 /41370
- ^{1} French Land Register data, which excludes lakes, ponds, glaciers > 1 km^{2} (0.386 sq mi or 247 acres) and river estuaries.

Saint-Léonard-en-Beauce (French pronunciation: [sɛ̃ le.ɔnaʁ ɑ̃ bos], literally Saint-Léonard in Beauce) is a commune in the Loir-et-Cher department of central France.

== Population ==
Historical population
Year	Pop.	±% p.a.
1968	646	—
1975	570	−1.77%
1982	571	+0.03%
1990	522	−1.12%
1999	538	+0.34%
2007	609	+1.56%
2012	638	+0.93%
2017	644	+0.19%
2023	634	−0.26%
Source: INSEE

== See also ==
- Communes of the Loir-et-Cher department
