= Conan, Loir-et-Cher =

Conan
- Commune
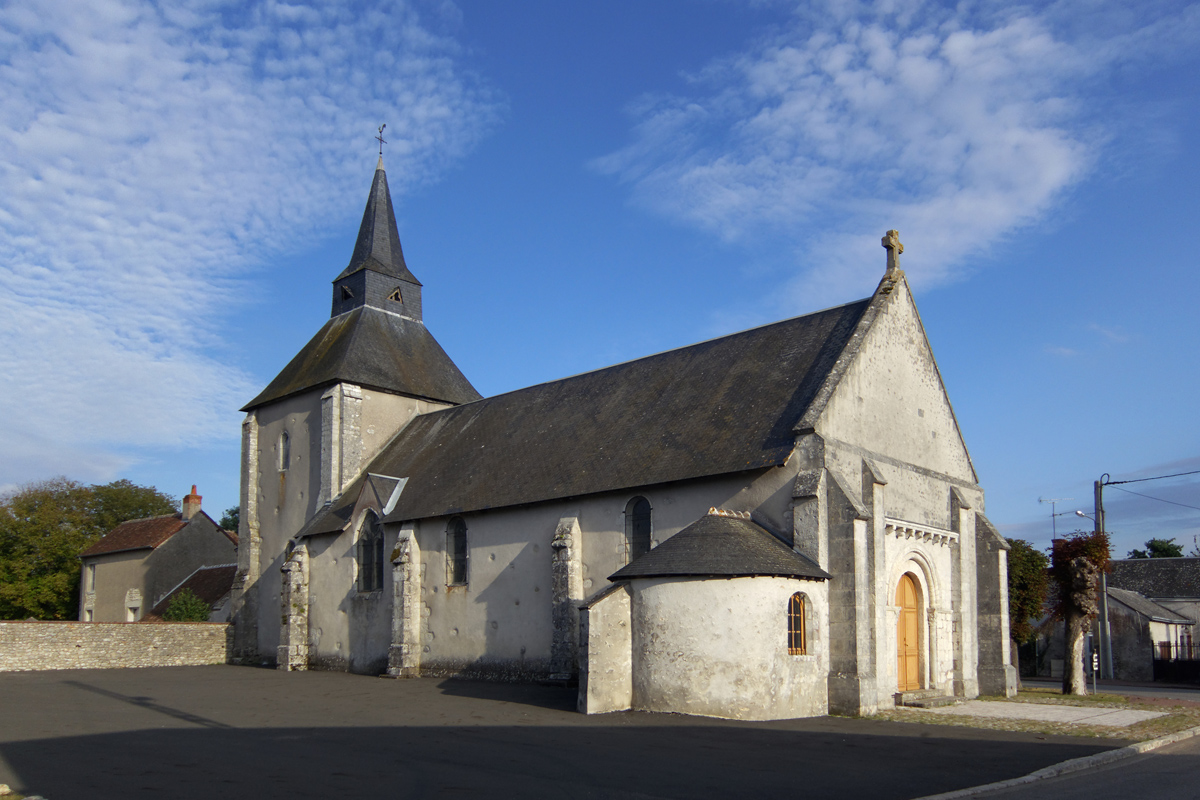
- Location of Conan
- Location within France Location within Centre-Val de Loire
- Coordinates: 47°44′58″N 1°17′14″E
- Country: France
- Region: Centre-Val de Loire
- Department: Loir-et-Cher
- Arrondissement: Blois
- Canton: La Beauce

Government
  - Mayor (2020–2026): Olivier Théophile
- Area^{1}: 15.3 km^{2} (5.9 sq mi)
- Elevation: 121 m (397 ft)
- Highest elevation: 126 m (413 ft)
- Lowest elevation: 97 m (318 ft)
- Population (2023): 159
  - Density: 10.4/km^{2} (26.9/sq mi)
- Time zone: UTC+01:00 (CET)
  - Summer (DST): UTC+02:00 (CEST)
- INSEE/Postal code: 41057 /41290
- ^{1} French Land Register data, which excludes lakes, ponds, glaciers > 1 km^{2} (0.386 sq mi or 247 acres) and river estuaries.

Conan (French pronunciation: [kɔnɑ̃]) is a commune in the Loir-et-Cher department of central France.

== Population ==
Historical population
Year	Pop.	±% p.a.
1968	229	—
1975	204	−1.64%
1982	170	−2.57%
1990	157	−0.99%
1999	189	+2.08%
2007	192	+0.20%
2012	206	+1.42%
2017	175	−3.21%
2023	159	−1.59%
Source: INSEE

== See also ==
- Communes of the Loir-et-Cher department
