= Boisseau =

- Commune
- Location of Boisseau
- Location within France Location within Centre-Val de Loire
- Coordinates: 47°46′23″N 1°17′51″E
- Country: France
- Region: Centre-Val de Loire
- Department: Loir-et-Cher
- Arrondissement: Blois
- Canton: La Beauce

Government
  - Mayor (2020–2026): Marc Gaulandeau
- Area^{1}: 8.06 km^{2} (3.11 sq mi)
- Highest elevation: 129 m (423 ft)
- Lowest elevation: 103 m (338 ft)
- Population (2023): 110
  - Density: 14/km^{2} (35/sq mi)
- Time zone: UTC+01:00 (CET)
  - Summer (DST): UTC+02:00 (CEST)
- INSEE/Postal code: 41019 /41290
- ^{1} French Land Register data, which excludes lakes, ponds, glaciers > 1 km^{2} (0.386 sq mi or 247 acres) and river estuaries.

Boisseau (French pronunciation: [bwaso]) is a commune in the Loir-et-Cher department in central France.

== Population ==
Historical population
Year	Pop.	±% p.a.
1968	141	—
1975	124	−1.82%
1982	100	−3.03%
1990	99	−0.13%
1999	86	−1.55%
2007	94	+1.12%
2012	104	+2.04%
2017	99	−0.98%
2023	110	+1.77%
Source: INSEE

== See also ==
- Communes of the Loir-et-Cher department
