= Muides-sur-Loire =

- Commune
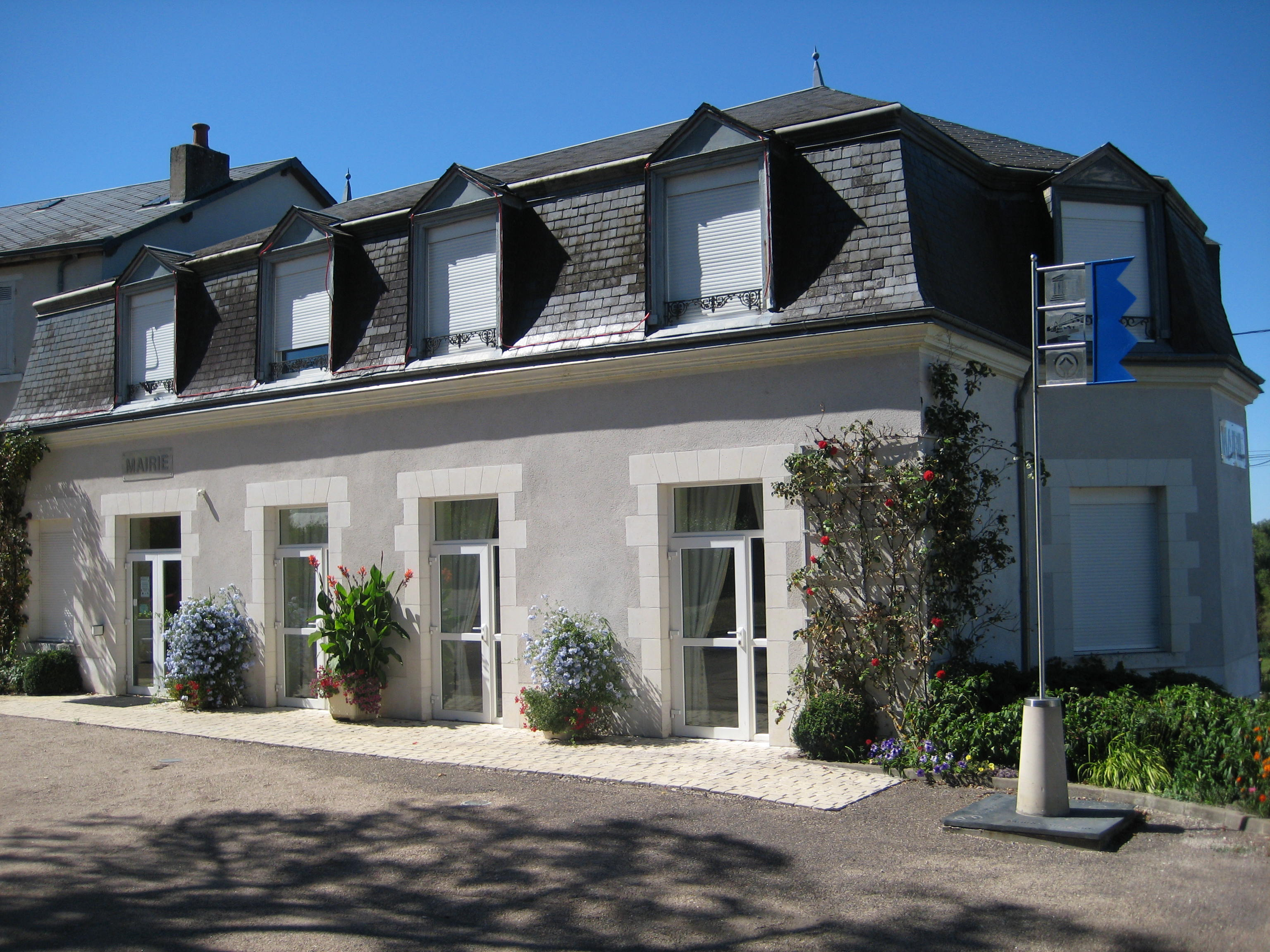
- Town hall

- Coat of arms
- Location of Muides-sur-Loire
- Location within France Location within Centre-Val de Loire
- Coordinates: 47°40′11″N 1°31′44″E
- Country: France
- Region: Centre-Val de Loire
- Department: Loir-et-Cher
- Arrondissement: Blois
- Canton: La Beauce
- Intercommunality: Beauce Val de Loire

Government
  - Mayor (2020–2026): Christian Justine
- Area^{1}: 9.15 km^{2} (3.53 sq mi)
- Elevation: 85 m (279 ft)
- Highest elevation: 104 m (341 ft)
- Lowest elevation: 72 m (236 ft)
- Population (2023): 1,264
  - Density: 138/km^{2} (358/sq mi)
- Time zone: UTC+01:00 (CET)
  - Summer (DST): UTC+02:00 (CEST)
- INSEE/Postal code: 41155 /41500
- ^{1} French Land Register data, which excludes lakes, ponds, glaciers > 1 km^{2} (0.386 sq mi or 247 acres) and river estuaries.

Muides-sur-Loire (French pronunciation: [mɥid syʁ lwaʁ], literally Muides on Loire) is a commune in the Loir-et-Cher department, central France.

== Population ==
Historical population
Year	Pop.	±% p.a.
1968	741	—
1975	786	+0.85%
1982	884	+1.69%
1990	1,115	+2.94%
1999	1,157	+0.41%
2007	1,317	+1.63%
2012	1,348	+0.47%
2017	1,259	−1.36%
2023	1,264	+0.07%
Source: INSEE

== See also ==
- Communes of the Loir-et-Cher department
