= Communes of the Loir-et-Cher department =

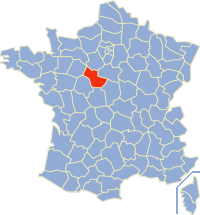

The following is a list of the 267 communes of the Loir-et-Cher department of France.

The communes cooperate in the following intercommunalities (as of 2025):

- Communauté d'agglomération de Blois Agglopolys
- Communauté d'agglomération Territoires Vendômois
- Communauté de communes Beauce Val de Loire
- Communauté de communes Cœur de Sologne
- Communauté de communes des Collines du Perche
- Communauté de communes du Grand Chambord
- Communauté de communes du Perche et Haut Vendômois
- Communauté de communes du Romorantinais et du Monestois
- Communauté de communes de la Sologne des Étangs
- Communauté de communes de la Sologne des Rivières
- Communauté de communes des Terres du Val de Loire (partly)
- Communauté de communes Val-de-Cher-Controis

INSEE	Postal	Commune
41001	41310	Ambloy
41002	41400	Angé
41003	41100	Areines
41004	41800	Artins
41006	41240	Autainville
41007	41310	Authon
41008	41500	Avaray
41009	41330	Averdon
41010	41100	Azé
41012	41170	Baillou
41013	41250	Bauzy
41173	41240	Beauce-la-Romaine
41014	41170	Beauchêne
41016	41130	Billy
41017	41240	Binas
41018	41000	Blois
41019	41290	Boisseau
41020	41800	Bonneveau
41022	41270	Bouffry
41024	41270	Boursay
41025	41250	Bracieux
41026	41160	Brévainville
41027	41370	Briou
41028	41160	Busloup
41029	41120	Candé-sur-Beuvron
41030	41360	Cellé
41031	41120	Cellettes
41032	41120	Chailles
41034	41250	Chambord
41035	41330	Champigny-en-Beauce
41036	41600	Chaon
41037	41290	La Chapelle-Enchérie
41038	41320	La Chapelle-Montmartin
41039	41500	La Chapelle-Saint-Martin-en-Plaine
41040	41330	La Chapelle-Vendômoise
41041	41270	La Chapelle-Vicomtesse
41042	41110	Châteauvieux
41043	41130	Châtillon-sur-Cher
41044	41320	Châtres-sur-Cher
41045	41150	Chaumont-sur-Loire
41046	41600	Chaumont-sur-Tharonne
41047	41260	La Chaussée-Saint-Victor
41048	41270	Chauvigny-du-Perche
41049	41700	Chémery
41050	41700	Cheverny
41051	41400	Chissay-en-Touraine
41052	41120	Chitenay
41053	41170	Choue
41054	41700	Choussy
41057	41290	Conan
41058	41370	Concriers
41059	41700	Le Controis-en-Sologne
41060	41170	Cormenon
41061	41120	Cormeray
41062	41700	Couddes
41248	41170	Couëtron-au-Perche
41063	41110	Couffy
41065	41100	Coulommiers-la-Tour
41066	41500	Courbouzon
41067	41700	Cour-Cheverny
41068	41230	Courmemin
41069	41500	Cour-sur-Loire
41071	41220	Crouy-sur-Cosson
41072	41100	Crucheray
41073	41160	Danzé
41074	41220	Dhuizon
41075	41270	Droué
41077	41290	Épiais
41078	41360	Épuisay
41079	41800	Les Essarts
41080	41400	Faverolles-sur-Cher
41081	41100	Faye
41083	41210	La Ferté-Beauharnais
41084	41300	La Ferté-Imbault
41085	41220	La Ferté-Saint-Cyr
41087	41800	Fontaine-les-Coteaux
41088	41270	Fontaine-Raoul
41086	41250	Fontaines-en-Sologne
41089	41270	La Fontenelle
41090	41360	Fortan
41091	41330	Fossé
41093	41190	Françay
41094	41700	Fresnes
41095	41160	Fréteval
41096	41270	Le Gault-du-Perche
41097	41130	Gièvres
41098	41310	Gombergean
41099	41230	Gy-en-Sologne
41100	41800	Les Hayes
41101	41190	Herbault
41102	41800	Houssay
41103	41310	Huisseau-en-Beauce
41104	41350	Huisseau-sur-Cosson
41105	41370	Josnes
41106	41600	Lamotte-Beuvron
41107	41310	Lancé
41108	41190	Lancôme
41109	41190	Landes-le-Gaulois
41110	41320	Langon-sur-Cher
41112	41230	Lassay-sur-Croisne
41113	41800	Lavardin
41114	41500	Lestiou
41115	41160	Lignières
41116	41100	Lisle
41118	41200	Loreux
41119	41370	Lorges
41120	41360	Lunay
41121	41370	La Madeleine-Villefrouin
41122	41320	Maray
41123	41370	Marchenoir
41124	41100	Marcilly-en-Beauce
41125	41210	Marcilly-en-Gault
41126	41110	Mareuil-sur-Cher
41127	41210	La Marolle-en-Sologne
41128	41330	Marolles
41129	41250	Maslives
41130	41500	Maves
41131	41100	Mazangé
41132	41140	Méhers
41134	41500	Menars
41135	41320	Mennetou-sur-Cher
41136	41500	Mer
41137	41150	Mesland
41138	41100	Meslay
41139	41130	Meusnes
41140	41200	Millançay
41141	41160	Moisy
41143	41170	Mondoubleau
41144	41150	Monteaux
41145	41120	Monthou-sur-Bièvre
41146	41400	Monthou-sur-Cher
41147	41120	Les Montils
41148	41350	Montlivault
41149	41800	Montoire-sur-le-Loir
41150	41250	Mont-près-Chambord

INSEE	Postal	Commune
41151	41400	Montrichard-Val-de-Cher
41152	41210	Montrieux-en-Sologne
41153	41800	Montrouveau
41154	41160	Morée
41155	41500	Muides-sur-Loire
41156	41500	Mulsans
41157	41230	Mur-de-Sologne
41158	41100	Naveil
41159	41210	Neung-sur-Beuvron
41160	41250	Neuvy
41161	41600	Nouan-le-Fuzelier
41163	41310	Nourray
41164	41140	Noyers-sur-Cher
41166	41700	Oisly
41168	41300	Orçay
41171	41290	Oucques la Nouvelle
41172	41160	Ouzouer-le-Doyen
41174	41100	Périgny
41175	41100	Pezou
41176	41300	Pierrefitte-sur-Sauldre
41177	41170	Le Plessis-Dorin
41178	41370	Le Plessis-l'Échelle
41179	41270	Le Poislay
41180	41400	Pontlevoy
41181	41110	Pouillé
41182	41190	Pray
41184	41310	Prunay-Cassereau
41185	41200	Pruniers-en-Sologne
41186	41160	Rahart
41187	41100	Renay
41188	41290	Rhodon
41189	41150	Rilly-sur-Loire
41190	41100	Rocé
41191	41370	Roches
41192	41800	Les Roches-l'Évêque
41193	41270	Romilly
41194	41200	Romorantin-Lanthenay
41195	41230	Rougeou
41196	41270	Ruan-sur-Egvonne
41198	41110	Saint-Aignan
41199	41310	Saint-Amand-Longpré
41201	41800	Saint-Arnoult
41203	41330	Saint-Bohaire
41204	41350	Saint-Claude-de-Diray
41205	41190	Saint-Cyr-du-Gault
41206	41000	Saint-Denis-sur-Loire
41207	41500	Saint-Dyé-sur-Loire
41200	41100	Sainte-Anne
41208	41190	Saint-Étienne-des-Guérets
41209	41100	Saint-Firmin-des-Prés
41211	41400	Saint-Georges-sur-Cher
41212	41350	Saint-Gervais-la-Forêt
41213	41310	Saint-Gourgon
41214	41160	Saint-Hilaire-la-Gravelle
41215	41800	Saint-Jacques-des-Guérets
41216	41160	Saint-Jean-Froidmentel
41217	41400	Saint-Julien-de-Chédon
41218	41320	Saint-Julien-sur-Cher
41219	41240	Saint-Laurent-des-Bois
41220	41220	Saint-Laurent-Nouan
41221	41370	Saint-Léonard-en-Beauce
41222	41320	Saint-Loup
41223	41190	Saint-Lubin-en-Vergonnois
41224	41170	Saint-Marc-du-Cor
41225	41800	Saint-Martin-des-Bois
41226	41100	Saint-Ouen
41228	41800	Saint-Rimay
41229	41140	Saint-Romain-sur-Cher
41230	41000	Saint-Sulpice-de-Pommeray
41231	41210	Saint-Viâtre
41232	41300	Salbris
41233	41120	Sambin
41234	41190	Santenay
41235	41170	Sargé-sur-Braye
41236	41310	Sasnières
41237	41700	Sassay
41238	41360	Savigny-sur-Braye
41239	41110	Seigy
41241	41300	Selles-Saint-Denis
41242	41130	Selles-sur-Cher
41243	41100	Selommes
41245	41500	Séris
41246	41120	Seur
41247	41230	Soings-en-Sologne
41249	41300	Souesmes
41250	41800	Sougé
41251	41600	Souvigny-en-Sologne
41252	41500	Suèvres
41253	41370	Talcy
41254	41170	Le Temple
41255	41800	Ternay
41256	41300	Theillay
41258	41140	Thésée
41259	41100	Thoré-la-Rochette
41260	41220	Thoury
41261	41190	Tourailles
41262	41250	Tour-en-Sologne
41265	41800	Troo
41266	41120	Valaire
41142	41190	Valencisse
41070	41800	Vallée-de-Ronsard
41267	41400	Vallières-les-Grandes
41055	41150	Valloire-sur-Cisse
41268	41230	Veilleins
41269	41100	Vendôme
41271	41230	Vernou-en-Sologne
41167	41150	Veuzain-sur-Loire
41273	41290	Vievy-le-Rayé
41274	41800	Villavard
41275	41160	La Ville-aux-Clercs
41276	41000	Villebarou
41277	41270	Villebout
41278	41310	Villechauve
41279	41800	Villedieu-le-Château
41280	41200	Villefranche-sur-Cher
41281	41330	Villefrancœur
41282	41200	Villeherviers
41283	41100	Villemardy
41284	41290	Villeneuve-Frouville
41285	41220	Villeny
41286	41310	Villeporcher
41287	41100	Villerable
41288	41000	Villerbon
41289	41240	Villermain
41290	41100	Villeromain
41291	41100	Villetrun
41292	41500	Villexanton
41293	41100	Villiersfaux
41294	41100	Villiers-sur-Loir
41295	41350	Vineuil
41296	41600	Vouzon
41297	41600	Yvoy-le-Marron
