= Avaray =

- Commune
- Coat of arms
- Location of Avaray
- Location within France Location within Centre-Val de Loire
- Coordinates: 47°43′24″N 1°33′55″E
- Country: France
- Region: Centre-Val de Loire
- Department: Loir-et-Cher
- Arrondissement: Blois
- Canton: La Beauce
- Intercommunality: CC Beauce Val Loire

Government
  - Mayor (2020–2026): Jean-François Mézille
- Area^{1}: 13.88 km^{2} (5.36 sq mi)
- Elevation: 106 m (348 ft)
- Highest elevation: 118 m (387 ft)
- Lowest elevation: 75 m (246 ft)
- Population (2023): 672
  - Density: 48.4/km^{2} (125/sq mi)
- Time zone: UTC+01:00 (CET)
  - Summer (DST): UTC+02:00 (CEST)
- INSEE/Postal code: 41008 /41500
- ^{1} French Land Register data, which excludes lakes, ponds, glaciers > 1 km^{2} (0.386 sq mi or 247 acres) and river estuaries.

Avaray (French pronunciation: [avaʁɛ]) is a commune in the Loir-et-Cher department in central France.

== History ==
Avaray is a French territorial title belonging to a family some of whose members have been conspicuous in history. The Béarnaise family named Besiade moved into the province of Orléanais in the 17th century, and there acquired the estate of Avaray. In 1667 Theophile de Besiade, marquis d'Avaray, obtained the office of grand bailiff of Orleans, which was held by several of his descendants after him.

Claude Antoine de Besiade, marquis d'Avaray, was deputy for the bailliage of Orleans in the states-general of 1789, and proposed a Declaration of the Duties of Man as a pendant to the Declaration of the Rights of Man and of the Citizen; he subsequently became a lieutenant-general in 1814, a peer of France in 1815, and duc d'Avaray in 1818. Antoine Louis Francois de Besiade, comte d'Avaray, son of the above, distinguished himself during the Revolution by his devotion to the comte de Provence, afterwards Louis XVIII, whose emigration he assisted. Having nominally become king in 1799, that prince created the estate of Ile-Jourdain a duchy, under the title of Avaray, in favour of the comte d'Avaray, whom he termed his "liberator".

== Population ==
Historical population
Year	Pop.	±% p.a.
1968	491	—
1975	466	−0.74%
1982	481	+0.45%
1990	514	+0.83%
1999	577	+1.29%
2007	722	+2.84%
2012	720	−0.06%
2017	737	+0.47%
2023	672	−1.53%
Source: INSEE

== Sights ==
The Château d'Avaray was built in the 16th century; of this building only four corner towers remain. In the 1730s a central building with two curving wings was erected. The park is magnificent and is said to have been designed by Le Nôtre.

== See also ==
- Communes of the Loir-et-Cher department
