= Rhodon =

- Commune
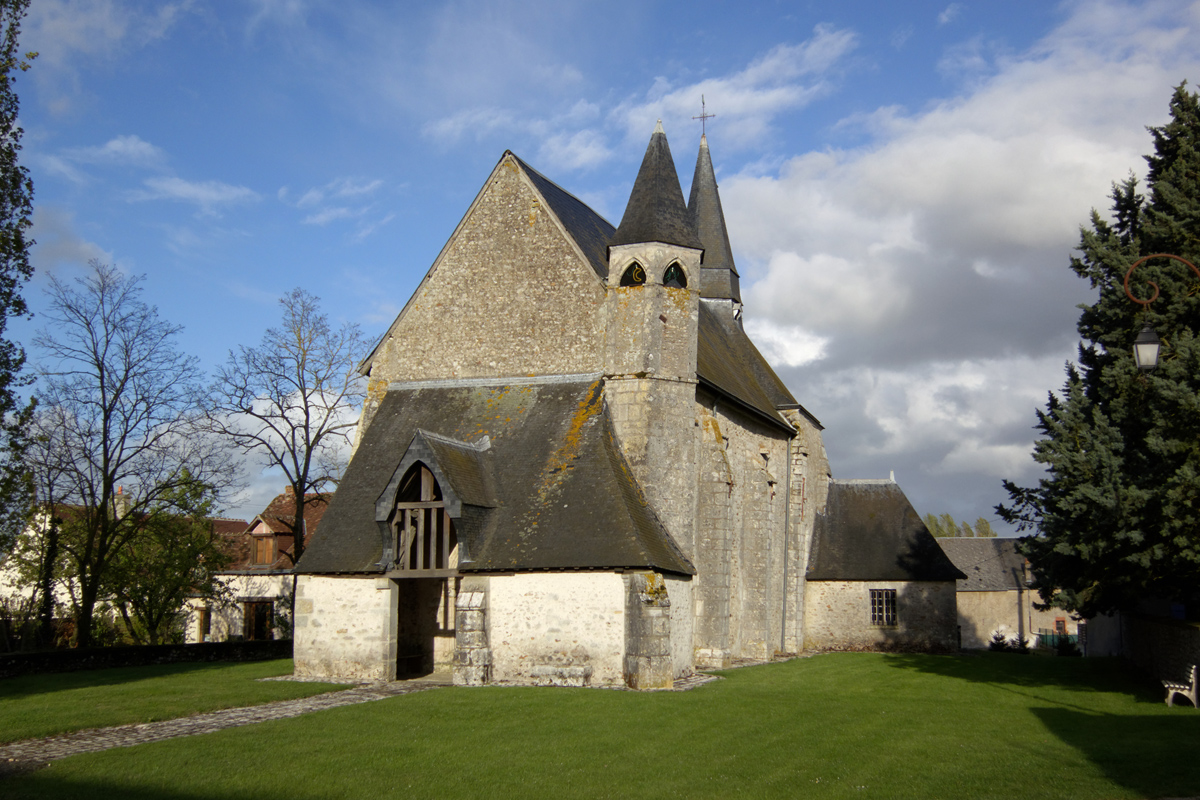
- Church of Saint-Cloud

- Coat of arms
- Location of Rhodon
- Location within France Location within Centre-Val de Loire
- Coordinates: 47°45′09″N 1°16′02″E
- Country: France
- Region: Centre-Val de Loire
- Department: Loir-et-Cher
- Arrondissement: Blois
- Canton: La Beauce

Government
  - Mayor (2020–2026): Xavier Vromman
- Area^{1}: 7.12 km^{2} (2.75 sq mi)
- Elevation: 127 m (417 ft)
- Highest elevation: 128 m (420 ft)
- Lowest elevation: 109 m (358 ft)
- Population (2023): 113
  - Density: 15.9/km^{2} (41.1/sq mi)
- Time zone: UTC+01:00 (CET)
  - Summer (DST): UTC+02:00 (CEST)
- INSEE/Postal code: 41188 /41290
- ^{1} French Land Register data, which excludes lakes, ponds, glaciers > 1 km^{2} (0.386 sq mi or 247 acres) and river estuaries.

Rhodon (French pronunciation: [ʁɔdɔ̃]) is a commune in the Loir-et-Cher department in central France.

== Population ==
Historical population
Year	Pop.	±% p.a.
1968	151	—
1975	109	−4.55%
1982	98	−1.51%
1990	79	−2.66%
1999	87	+1.08%
2007	92	+0.70%
2012	111	+3.83%
2017	123	+2.07%
2023	113	−1.40%
Source: INSEE

== See also ==
- Communes of the Loir-et-Cher department
