= Roches, Loir-et-Cher =

Roches
- Commune
- Location of Roches
- Location within France Location within Centre-Val de Loire
- Coordinates: 47°47′47″N 1°27′01″E
- Country: France
- Region: Centre-Val de Loire
- Department: Loir-et-Cher
- Arrondissement: Blois
- Canton: La Beauce
- Intercommunality: Beauce Val de Loire

Government
  - Mayor (2020–2026): Philippe Beaujouan
- Area^{1}: 8.79 km^{2} (3.39 sq mi)
- Elevation: 130 m (430 ft)
- Highest elevation: 136 m (446 ft)
- Lowest elevation: 112 m (367 ft)
- Population (2023): 63
  - Density: 7.2/km^{2} (19/sq mi)
- Time zone: UTC+01:00 (CET)
  - Summer (DST): UTC+02:00 (CEST)
- INSEE/Postal code: 41191 /41370
- ^{1} French Land Register data, which excludes lakes, ponds, glaciers > 1 km^{2} (0.386 sq mi or 247 acres) and river estuaries.

Roches (French pronunciation: [ʁɔʃ]) is a commune in the Loir-et-Cher department in central France.

== Population ==
Historical population
Year	Pop.	±% p.a.
1968	66	—
1975	60	−1.35%
1982	54	−1.49%
1990	76	+4.36%
1999	65	−1.72%
2007	74	+1.63%
2012	72	−0.55%
2017	69	−0.85%
2023	63	−1.50%
Source: INSEE

== See also ==
- Communes of the Loir-et-Cher department
