= Canton of La Beauce =

Administrative division of Loir-et-Cher, France

Coordinates: 47.91°N 1.53°E

A map of the canton of La Beauce in the Loir-et-Cher department

The canton of La Beauce (French: Canton de la Beauce) is a canton (an administrative division) of the Loir-et-Cher department, central France. Its seat is Beauce-la-Romaine. It was created at the canton reorganisation that came into effect in March 2015. Since then it elects two members of the Departmental Council of Loir-et-Cher.

== Composition ==
The canton of La Beauce consists of the following communes:

1. Autainville
2. Avaray
3. Beauce-la-Romaine
4. Binas
5. Boisseau
6. Briou
7. La Chapelle-Saint-Martin-en-Plaine
8. Conan
9. Concriers
10. Courbouzon
11. Cour-sur-Loire
12. Épiais
13. Josnes
14. Lestiou
15. Lorges
16. La Madeleine-Villefrouin
17. Marchenoir
18. Maves
19. Mer
20. Muides-sur-Loire
21. Mulsans
22. Oucques la Nouvelle
23. Le Plessis-l'Échelle
24. Rhodon
25. Roches
26. Saint-Laurent-des-Bois
27. Saint-Léonard-en-Beauce
28. Séris
29. Suèvres
30. Talcy
31. Vievy-le-Rayé
32. Villeneuve-Frouville
33. Villermain
34. Villexanton

== See also ==
- Beauce
