= Épiais =

- Commune
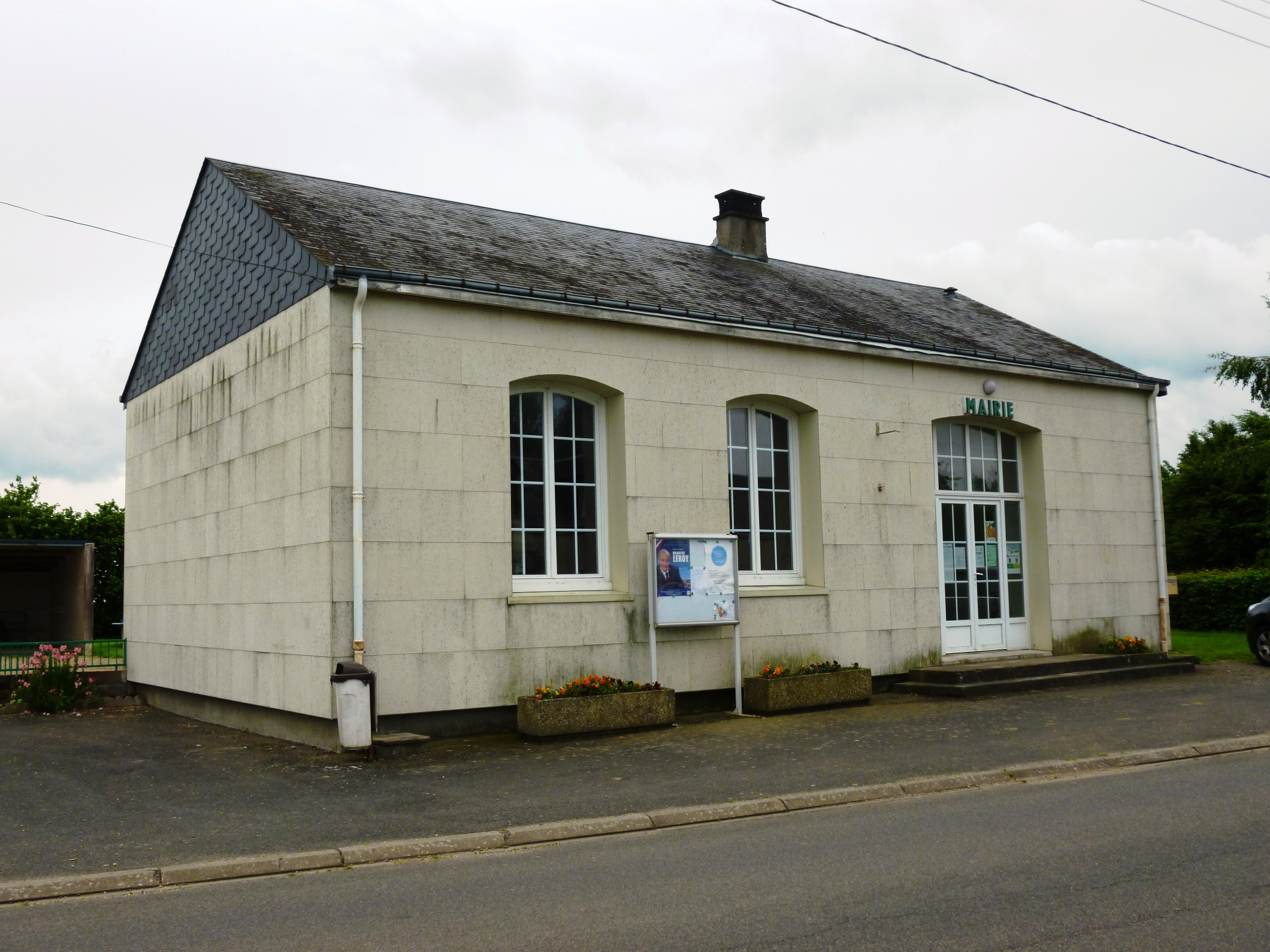
- Town hall

- Coat of arms
- Location of Épiais
- Location within France Location within Centre-Val de Loire
- Coordinates: 47°48′29″N 1°15′08″E
- Country: France
- Region: Centre-Val de Loire
- Department: Loir-et-Cher
- Arrondissement: Blois
- Canton: La Beauce
- Intercommunality: Beauce Val de Loire

Government
  - Mayor (2020–2026): Michel Peignant
- Area^{1}: 8.7 km^{2} (3.4 sq mi)
- Highest elevation: 136 m (446 ft)
- Lowest elevation: 108 m (354 ft)
- Population (2023): 115
  - Density: 13/km^{2} (34/sq mi)
- Time zone: UTC+01:00 (CET)
  - Summer (DST): UTC+02:00 (CEST)
- INSEE/Postal code: 41077 /41290
- ^{1} French Land Register data, which excludes lakes, ponds, glaciers > 1 km^{2} (0.386 sq mi or 247 acres) and river estuaries.

Épiais (French pronunciation: [epjɛ]) is a commune in the Loir-et-Cher department of central France.

== Population ==
Historical population
Year	Pop.	±% p.a.
1968	185	—
1975	153	−2.68%
1982	121	−3.30%
1990	87	−4.04%
1999	94	+0.86%
2007	115	+2.55%
2012	152	+5.74%
2017	136	−2.20%
2023	115	−2.76%
Source: INSEE

== See also ==
- Communes of the Loir-et-Cher department
