= Séris =

- Commune
- Location of Séris
- Location within France Location within Centre-Val de Loire
- Coordinates: 47°45′28″N 1°30′10″E
- Country: France
- Region: Centre-Val de Loire
- Department: Loir-et-Cher
- Arrondissement: Blois
- Canton: La Beauce
- Intercommunality: Beauce Val de Loire

Government
  - Mayor (2020–2026): Philippe Huguet
- Area^{1}: 17.52 km^{2} (6.76 sq mi)
- Elevation: 120 m (390 ft)
- Highest elevation: 119 m (390 ft)
- Lowest elevation: 103 m (338 ft)
- Population (2023): 388
  - Density: 22.1/km^{2} (57.4/sq mi)
- Time zone: UTC+01:00 (CET)
  - Summer (DST): UTC+02:00 (CEST)
- INSEE/Postal code: 41245 /41500
- ^{1} French Land Register data, which excludes lakes, ponds, glaciers > 1 km^{2} (0.386 sq mi or 247 acres) and river estuaries.

Séris is a commune in the Loir-et-Cher department in central France.

== Population ==
Historical population
| Year | Pop. | ±% p.a. |
|---|---|---|
| 1968 | 366 | — |
| 1975 | 297 | −2.94% |
| 1982 | 255 | −2.15% |
| 1990 | 265 | +0.48% |
| 1999 | 287 | +0.89% |
| 2007 | 365 | +3.05% |
| 2012 | 382 | +0.91% |
| 2017 | 376 | −0.32% |
| 2023 | 388 | +0.52% |
Source: INSEE

== See also ==
- Communes of the Loir-et-Cher department
