= Maves =

- Commune
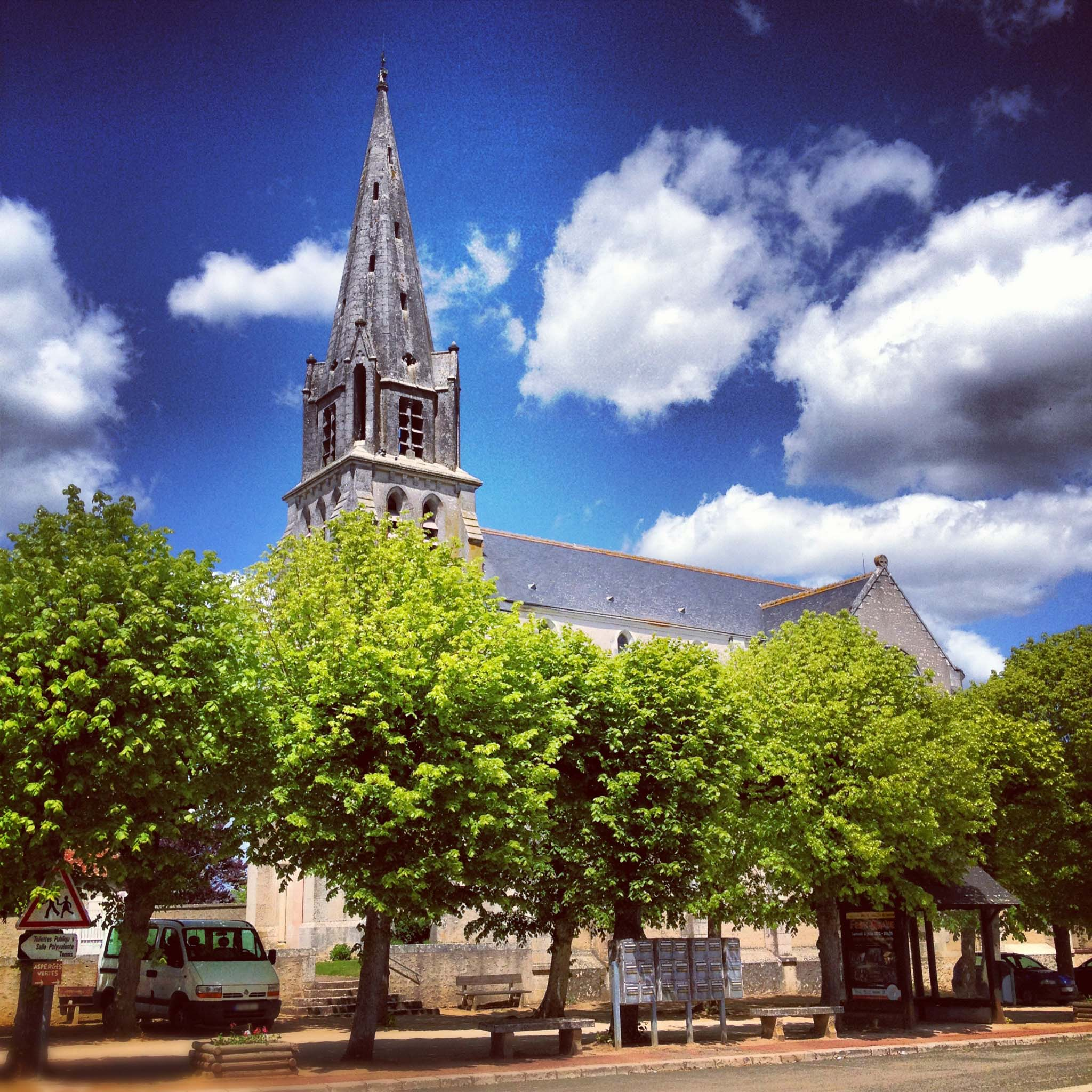
- Location of Maves
- Location within France Location within Centre-Val de Loire
- Coordinates: 47°44′35″N 1°21′55″E
- Country: France
- Region: Centre-Val de Loire
- Department: Loir-et-Cher
- Arrondissement: Blois
- Canton: La Beauce
- Intercommunality: Beauce Val de Loire

Government
  - Mayor (2020–2026): Astrid Lonqueu
- Area^{1}: 33.33 km^{2} (12.87 sq mi)
- Elevation: 100 m (330 ft)
- Highest elevation: 127 m (417 ft)
- Lowest elevation: 99 m (325 ft)
- Population (2023): 671
  - Density: 20.1/km^{2} (52.1/sq mi)
- Time zone: UTC+01:00 (CET)
  - Summer (DST): UTC+02:00 (CEST)
- INSEE/Postal code: 41130 /41500
- ^{1} French Land Register data, which excludes lakes, ponds, glaciers > 1 km^{2} (0.386 sq mi or 247 acres) and river estuaries.

Maves (French pronunciation: [mav]) is a commune in the Loir-et-Cher department of central France.

== Population ==
Historical population
Year	Pop.	±% p.a.
1968	532	—
1975	544	+0.32%
1982	518	−0.70%
1990	553	+0.82%
1999	577	+0.47%
2007	590	+0.28%
2012	689	+3.15%
2017	661	−0.83%
2023	671	+0.25%
Source: INSEE

== See also ==
- Communes of the Loir-et-Cher department
