= La Madeleine-Villefrouin =

- Commune
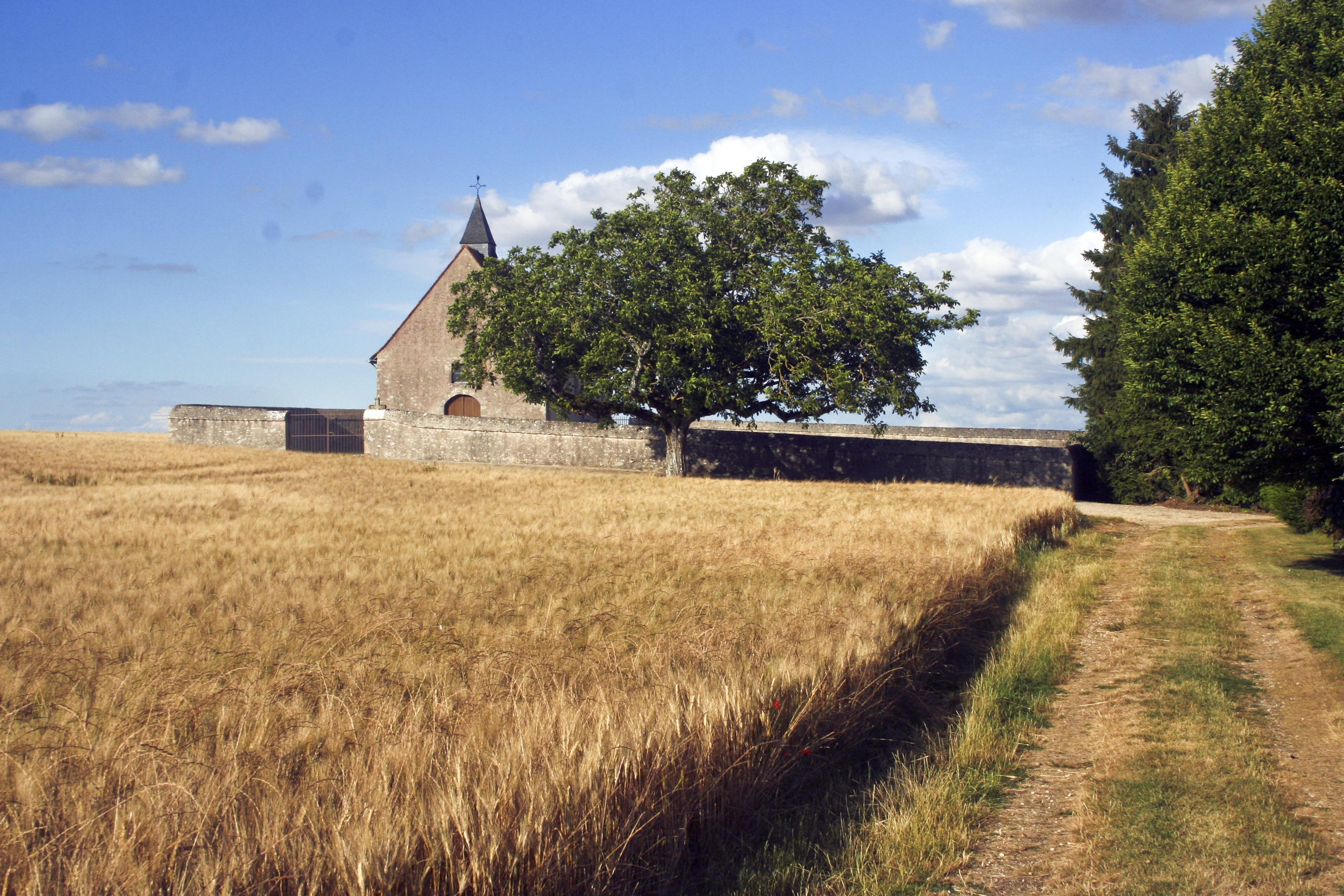

- Coat of arms
- Location of La Madeleine-Villefrouin
- Location within France Location within Centre-Val de Loire
- Coordinates: 47°46′23″N 1°23′42″E
- Country: France
- Region: Centre-Val de Loire
- Department: Loir-et-Cher
- Arrondissement: Blois
- Canton: La Beauce
- Intercommunality: Beauce Val de Loire

Government
  - Mayor (2020–2026): Antoine Beck
- Area^{1}: 9.68 km^{2} (3.74 sq mi)
- Elevation: 115 m (377 ft)
- Highest elevation: 128 m (420 ft)
- Lowest elevation: 105 m (344 ft)
- Population (2023): 33
  - Density: 3.4/km^{2} (8.8/sq mi)
- Time zone: UTC+01:00 (CET)
  - Summer (DST): UTC+02:00 (CEST)
- INSEE/Postal code: 41121 /41370
- ^{1} French Land Register data, which excludes lakes, ponds, glaciers > 1 km^{2} (0.386 sq mi or 247 acres) and river estuaries.

La Madeleine-Villefrouin (French pronunciation: [la madlɛn vilfʁuɛ̃]) is a village and commune in the Loir-et-Cher department of central France.

== Population ==
Historical population
Year	Pop.	±% p.a.
1968	41	—
1975	33	−3.05%
1982	36	+1.25%
1990	36	+0.00%
1999	28	−2.75%
2007	25	−1.41%
2012	30	+3.71%
2017	30	+0.00%
2023	33	+1.60%
Source: INSEE

== See also ==
- Communes of the Loir-et-Cher department
