= Autainville =

- Commune
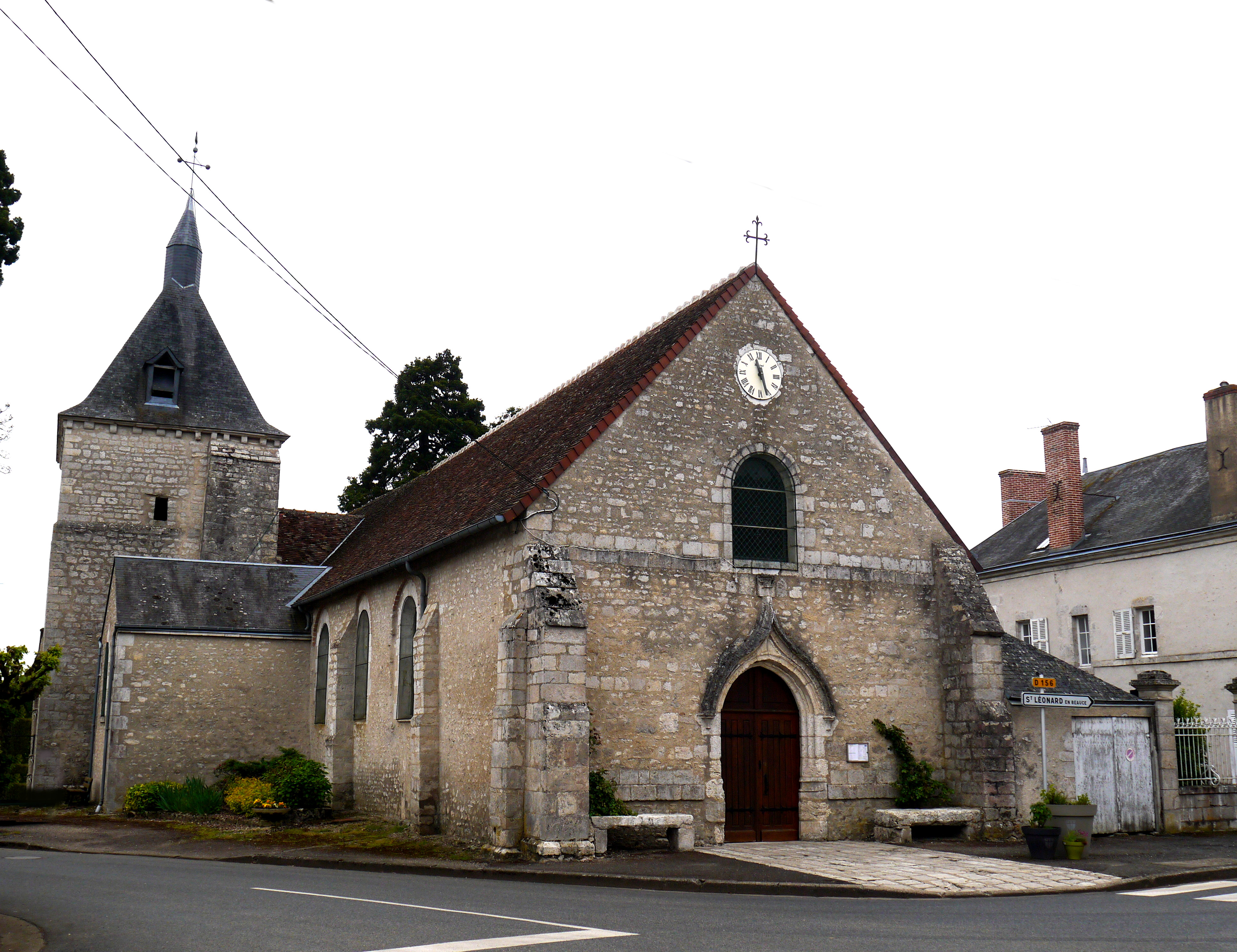
- Church of Saint Sulpice in Autainville

- Coat of arms
- Location of Autainville
- Location within France Location within Centre-Val de Loire
- Coordinates: 47°52′55″N 1°24′58″E
- Country: France
- Region: Centre-Val de Loire
- Department: Loir-et-Cher
- Arrondissement: Blois
- Canton: La Beauce
- Intercommunality: CC Beauce Val Loire

Government
  - Mayor (2020–2026): Christelle Pelle
- Area^{1}: 25.01 km^{2} (9.66 sq mi)
- Elevation: 150 m (490 ft)
- Highest elevation: 153 m (502 ft)
- Lowest elevation: 119 m (390 ft)
- Population (2023): 421
  - Density: 16.8/km^{2} (43.6/sq mi)
- Time zone: UTC+01:00 (CET)
  - Summer (DST): UTC+02:00 (CEST)
- INSEE/Postal code: 41006 /41240
- ^{1} French Land Register data, which excludes lakes, ponds, glaciers > 1 km^{2} (0.386 sq mi or 247 acres) and river estuaries.

Autainville (French pronunciation: [otɛ̃vil]) is a commune in the Loir-et-Cher department in central France.

== Population ==
Historical population
Year	Pop.	±% p.a.
1968	416	—
1975	391	−0.88%
1982	317	−2.95%
1990	290	−1.11%
1999	320	+1.10%
2007	357	+1.38%
2012	420	+3.30%
2017	444	+1.12%
2023	421	−0.88%
Source: INSEE

== See also ==
- Communes of the Loir-et-Cher department
