= Thoury =

- Commune
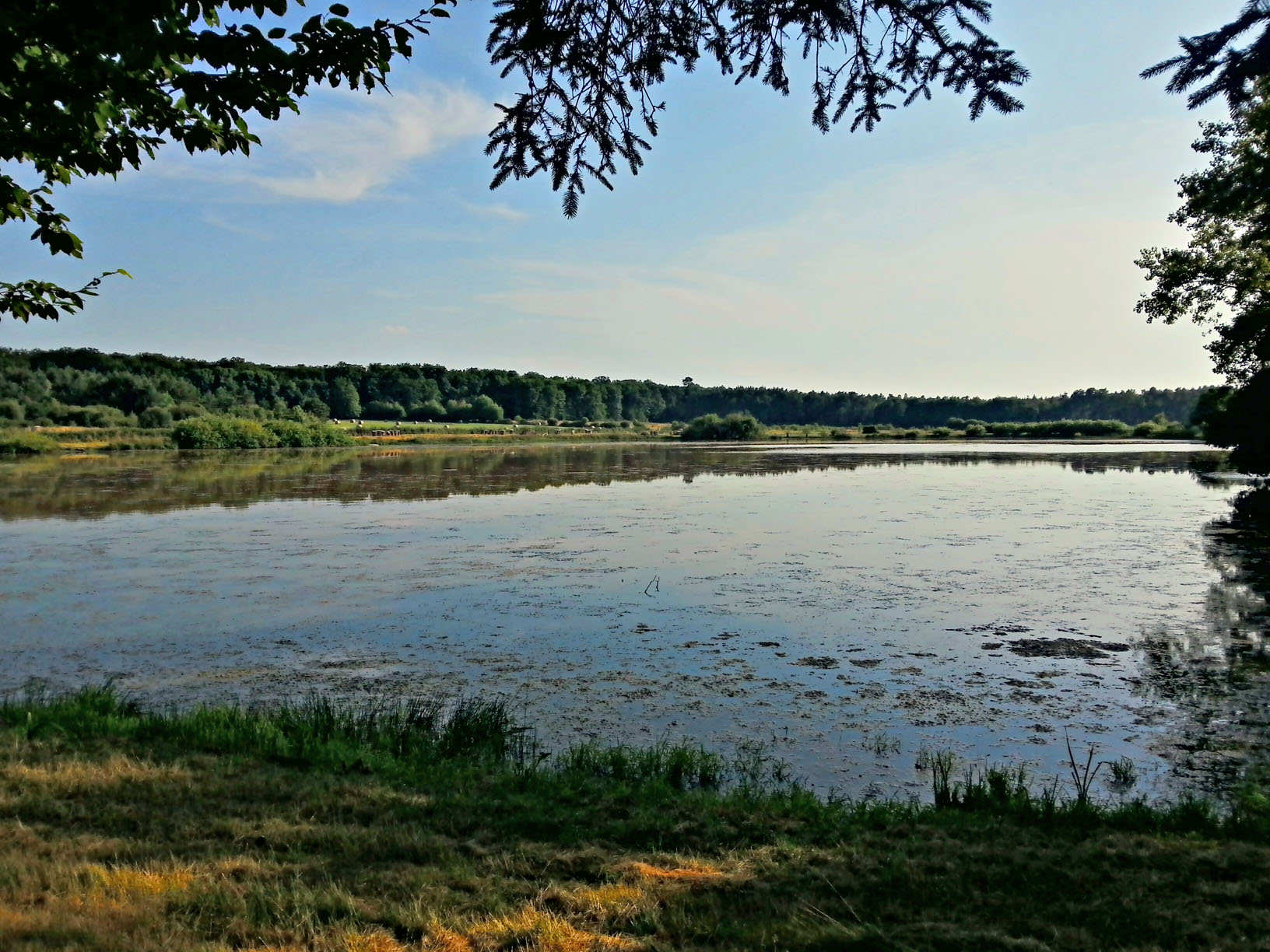
- La Pleure Pond
- Location of Thoury
- Location within France Location within Centre-Val de Loire
- Coordinates: 47°37′50″N 1°35′50″E
- Country: France
- Region: Centre-Val de Loire
- Department: Loir-et-Cher
- Arrondissement: Blois
- Canton: Chambord
- Intercommunality: Grand Chambord

Government
  - Mayor (2024–2026): Florence Barraud
- Area^{1}: 15.76 km^{2} (6.08 sq mi)
- Elevation: 82 m (269 ft)
- Highest elevation: 131 m (430 ft)
- Lowest elevation: 77 m (253 ft)
- Population (2023): 430
  - Density: 27/km^{2} (71/sq mi)
- Time zone: UTC+01:00 (CET)
  - Summer (DST): UTC+02:00 (CEST)
- INSEE/Postal code: 41260 /41220
- ^{1} French Land Register data, which excludes lakes, ponds, glaciers > 1 km^{2} (0.386 sq mi or 247 acres) and river estuaries.

Thoury (French pronunciation: [tuʁi]) is a commune of the Loir-et-Cher department in central France.

== Population ==
Historical population
| Year | Pop. | ±% p.a. |
|---|---|---|
| 1968 | 373 | — |
| 1975 | 347 | −1.03% |
| 1982 | 338 | −0.37% |
| 1990 | 362 | +0.86% |
| 1999 | 337 | −0.79% |
| 2007 | 378 | +1.45% |
| 2012 | 411 | +1.69% |
| 2017 | 420 | +0.43% |
| 2023 | 430 | +0.39% |
Source: INSEE

== See also ==
- Communes of the Loir-et-Cher department
