= Mulsans =

- Commune
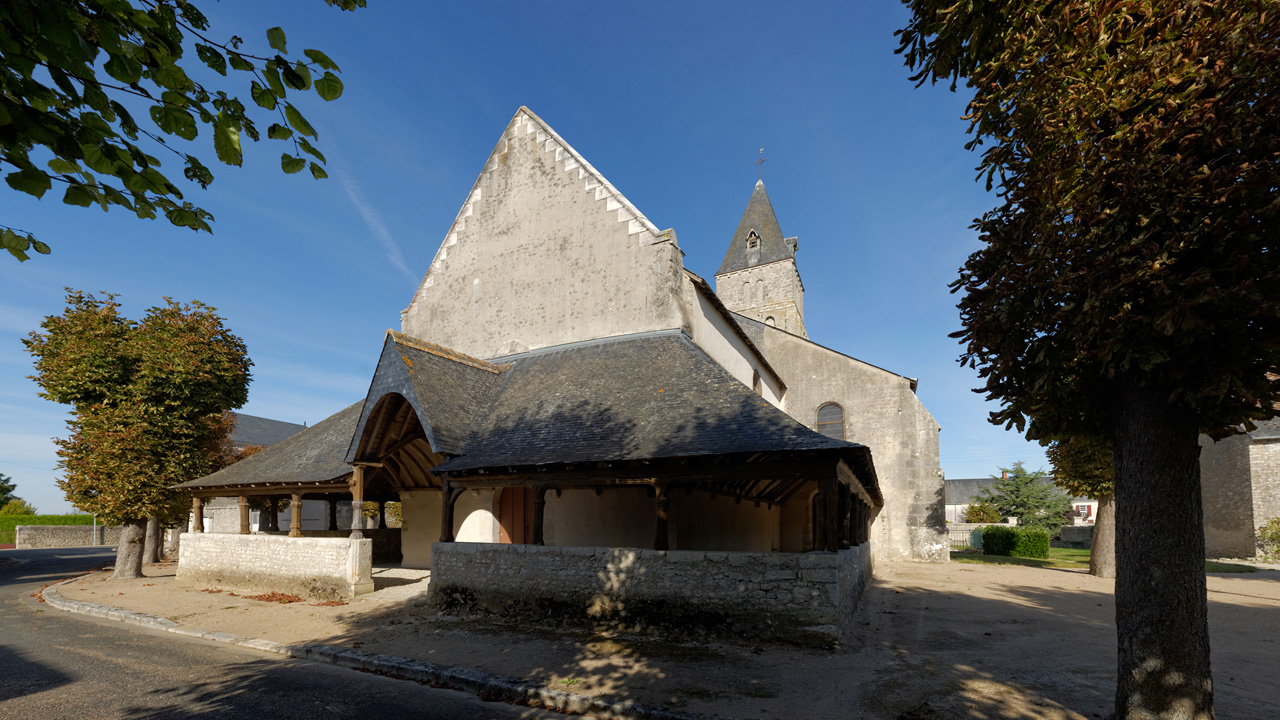
- Church of Our Lady
- Location of Mulsans
- Location within France Location within Centre-Val de Loire
- Coordinates: 47°41′48″N 1°23′09″E
- Country: France
- Region: Centre-Val de Loire
- Department: Loir-et-Cher
- Arrondissement: Blois
- Canton: La Beauce
- Intercommunality: Beauce Val de Loire

Government
  - Mayor (2020–2026): Jean-Pierre Arnoux
- Area^{1}: 16 km^{2} (6.2 sq mi)
- Elevation: 120 m (390 ft)
- Highest elevation: 121 m (397 ft)
- Lowest elevation: 105 m (344 ft)
- Population (2023): 508
  - Density: 32/km^{2} (82/sq mi)
- Time zone: UTC+01:00 (CET)
  - Summer (DST): UTC+02:00 (CEST)
- INSEE/Postal code: 41156 /41500
- ^{1} French Land Register data, which excludes lakes, ponds, glaciers > 1 km^{2} (0.386 sq mi or 247 acres) and river estuaries.

Mulsans (French pronunciation: [mylsɑ̃]) is a commune in the Loir-et-Cher department of central France.

== Population ==
Historical population
Year	Pop.	±% p.a.
1968	260	—
1975	306	+2.35%
1982	367	+2.63%
1990	374	+0.24%
1999	392	+0.52%
2007	428	+1.10%
2012	488	+2.66%
2017	502	+0.57%
2023	508	+0.20%
Source: INSEE

== See also ==
- Communes of the Loir-et-Cher department
