= Lestiou =

- Commune
- Coat of arms
- Location of Lestiou
- Location within France Location within Centre-Val de Loire
- Coordinates: 47°44′05″N 1°35′17″E
- Country: France
- Region: Centre-Val de Loire
- Department: Loir-et-Cher
- Arrondissement: Blois
- Canton: La Beauce
- Intercommunality: Beauce Val de Loire

Government
  - Mayor (2020–2026): David Albaret
- Area^{1}: 8.29 km^{2} (3.20 sq mi)
- Elevation: 93 m (305 ft)
- Highest elevation: 117 m (384 ft)
- Lowest elevation: 77 m (253 ft)
- Population (2023): 291
  - Density: 35.1/km^{2} (90.9/sq mi)
- Time zone: UTC+01:00 (CET)
  - Summer (DST): UTC+02:00 (CEST)
- INSEE/Postal code: 41114 /41500
- ^{1} French Land Register data, which excludes lakes, ponds, glaciers > 1 km^{2} (0.386 sq mi or 247 acres) and river estuaries.

Lestiou is a commune in the Loir-et-Cher department of central France.

== Population ==
Historical population
Year	Pop.	±% p.a.
1968	144	—
1975	141	−0.30%
1982	173	+2.96%
1990	193	+1.38%
1999	203	+0.56%
2007	254	+2.84%
2012	273	+1.45%
2017	290	+1.22%
2023	291	+0.06%
Source: INSEE

== See also ==
- Communes of the Loir-et-Cher department
