= Crouy-sur-Cosson =

- Commune
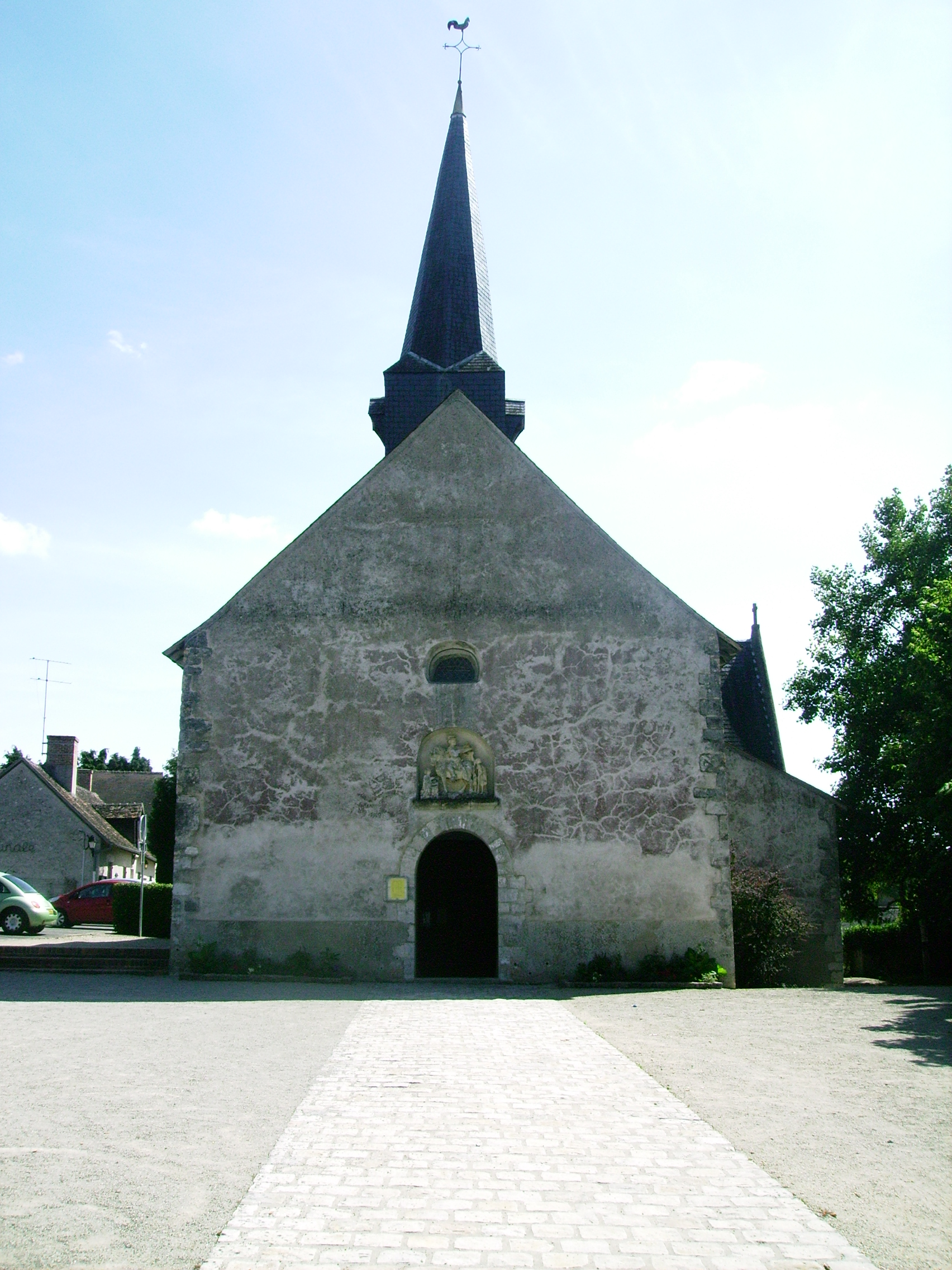
- Location of Crouy-sur-Cosson
- Location within France Location within Centre-Val de Loire
- Coordinates: 47°39′05″N 1°36′27″E
- Country: France
- Region: Centre-Val de Loire
- Department: Loir-et-Cher
- Arrondissement: Blois
- Canton: Chambord

Government
  - Mayor (2020–2026): Claudette Sorin
- Area^{1}: 28.37 km^{2} (10.95 sq mi)
- Elevation: 85 m (279 ft)
- Highest elevation: 111 m (364 ft)
- Lowest elevation: 77 m (253 ft)
- Population (2023): 507
  - Density: 17.9/km^{2} (46.3/sq mi)
- Time zone: UTC+01:00 (CET)
  - Summer (DST): UTC+02:00 (CEST)
- INSEE/Postal code: 41071 /41220
- ^{1} French Land Register data, which excludes lakes, ponds, glaciers > 1 km^{2} (0.386 sq mi or 247 acres) and river estuaries.

Crouy-sur-Cosson (French pronunciation: [kʁui syʁ kɔsɔ̃], literally Crouy on Cosson) is a commune in the Loir-et-Cher department of central France.

== Population ==
Historical population
Year	Pop.	±% p.a.
1968	438	—
1975	404	−1.15%
1982	461	+1.90%
1990	471	+0.27%
1999	472	+0.02%
2007	502	+0.77%
2012	497	−0.20%
2017	537	+1.56%
2023	507	−0.95%
Source: INSEE

== See also ==
- Communes of the Loir-et-Cher department
