= Josnes =

- Commune
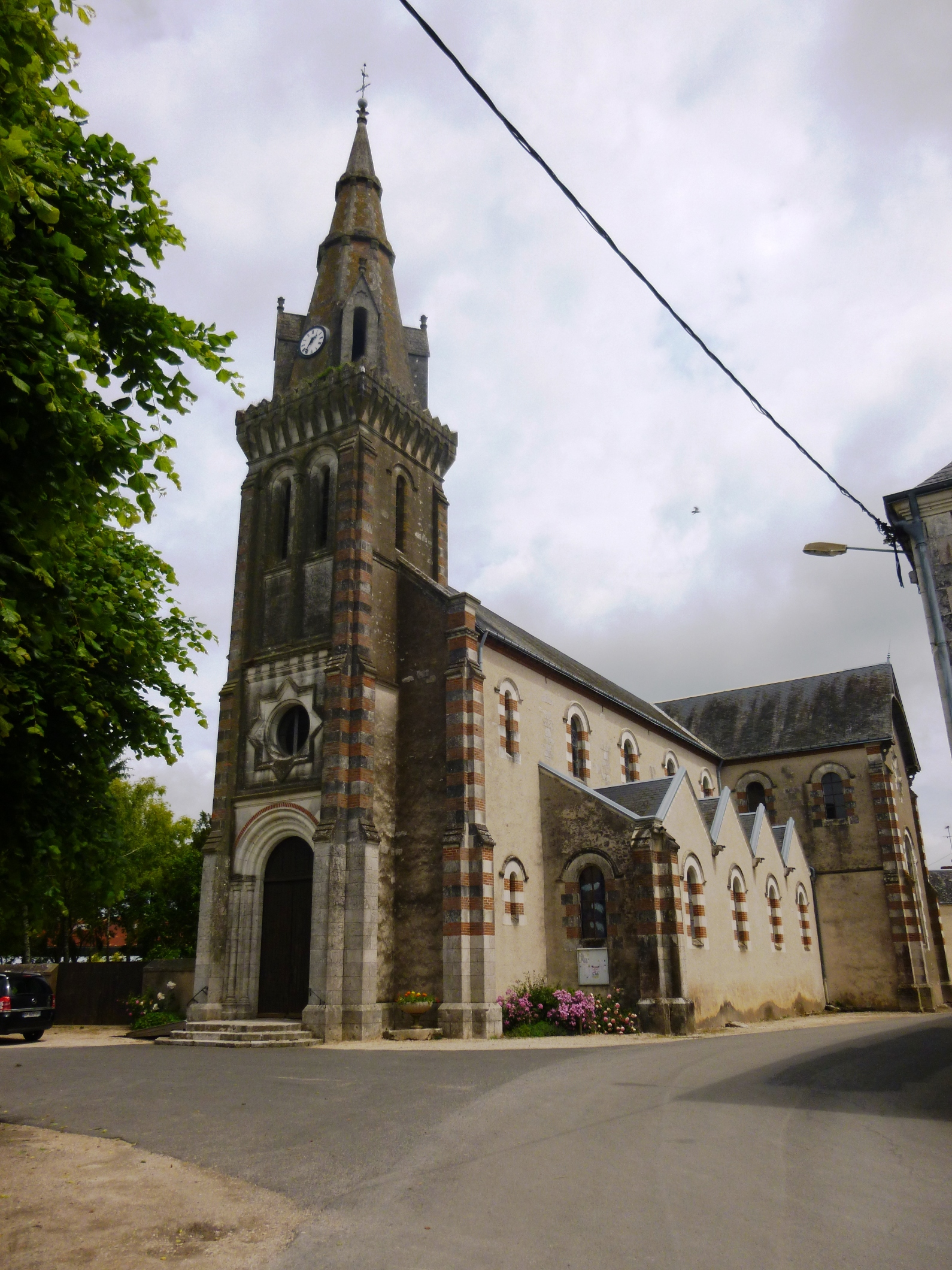

- Coat of arms
- Location of Josnes
- Location within France Location within Centre-Val de Loire
- Coordinates: 47°47′50″N 1°31′31″E
- Country: France
- Region: Centre-Val de Loire
- Department: Loir-et-Cher
- Arrondissement: Blois
- Canton: La Beauce
- Intercommunality: Beauce Val de Loire

Government
  - Mayor (2020–2026): Catherine Baudouin
- Area^{1}: 20.63 km^{2} (7.97 sq mi)
- Elevation: 120 m (390 ft)
- Highest elevation: 130 m (430 ft)
- Lowest elevation: 108 m (354 ft)
- Population (2023): 878
  - Density: 42.6/km^{2} (110/sq mi)
- Time zone: UTC+01:00 (CET)
  - Summer (DST): UTC+02:00 (CEST)
- INSEE/Postal code: 41105 /41370
- ^{1} French Land Register data, which excludes lakes, ponds, glaciers > 1 km^{2} (0.386 sq mi or 247 acres) and river estuaries.

Josnes (French pronunciation: [ʒon]) is a commune in the Loir-et-Cher department of central France.

== Population ==
Historical population
Year	Pop.	±% p.a.
1968	861	—
1975	808	−0.90%
1982	793	−0.27%
1990	775	−0.29%
1999	872	+1.32%
2007	949	+1.06%
2012	902	−1.01%
2017	887	−0.33%
2023	878	−0.17%
Source: INSEE

== See also ==
- Communes of the Loir-et-Cher department
