= Sambin =

- Commune
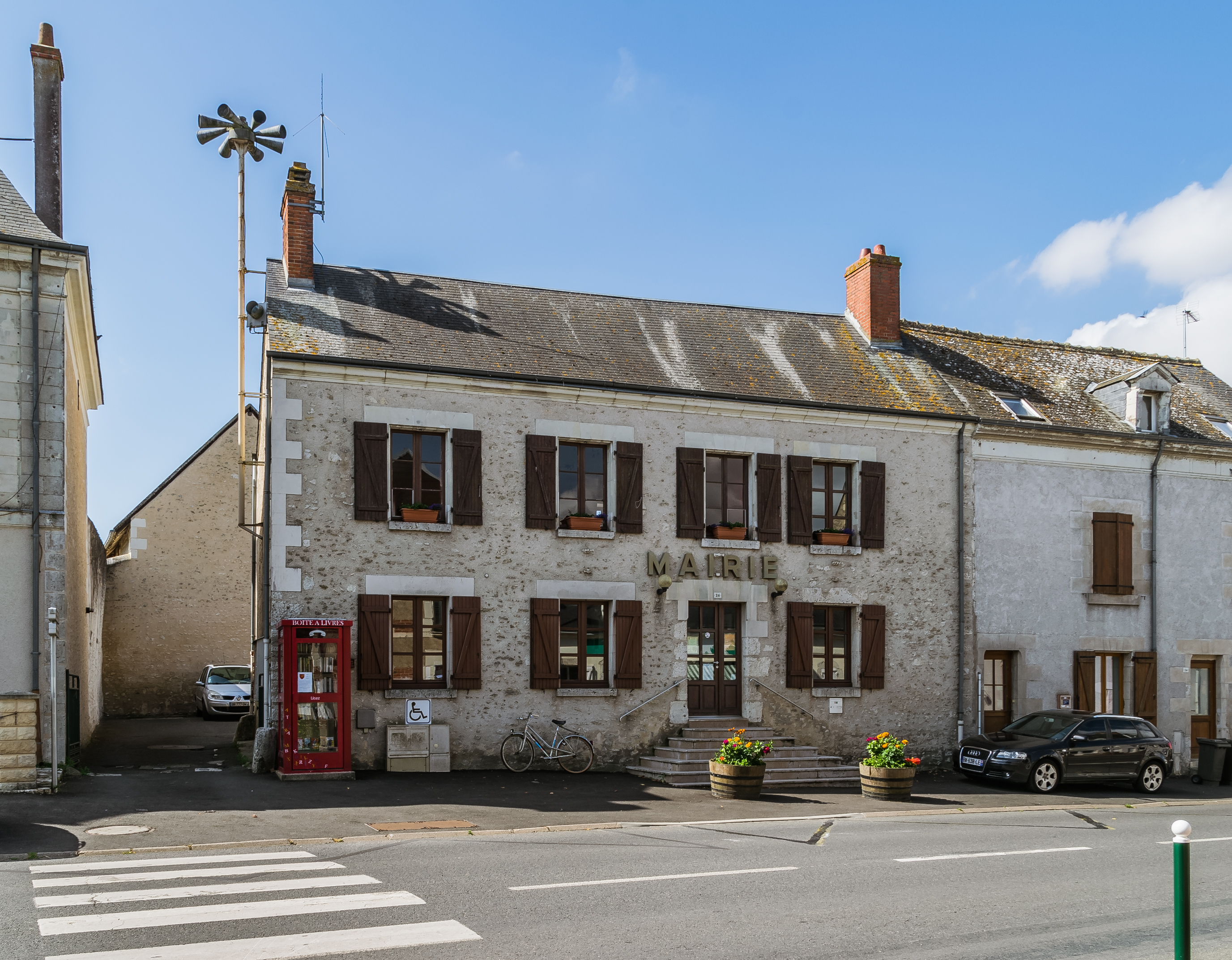
- Town hall of Sambin

- Coat of arms
- Location of Sambin
- Location within France Location within Centre-Val de Loire
- Coordinates: 47°26′19″N 1°17′52″E
- Country: France
- Region: Centre-Val de Loire
- Department: Loir-et-Cher
- Arrondissement: Blois
- Canton: Blois-3
- Intercommunality: CA Blois Agglopolys

Government
  - Mayor (2020–2026): Guy Vasseur
- Area^{1}: 20.83 km^{2} (8.04 sq mi)
- Elevation: 99 m (325 ft)
- Highest elevation: 120 m (390 ft)
- Lowest elevation: 84 m (276 ft)
- Population (2023): 862
  - Density: 41.4/km^{2} (107/sq mi)
- Time zone: UTC+01:00 (CET)
  - Summer (DST): UTC+02:00 (CEST)
- INSEE/Postal code: 41233 /41120
- ^{1} French Land Register data, which excludes lakes, ponds, glaciers > 1 km^{2} (0.386 sq mi or 247 acres) and river estuaries.

Sambin (pronounced [sɑ̃bɛ̃]) is a commune in the French department of Loir-et-Cher, Centre-Val de Loire, France.

== Population ==
Historical population
Year	Pop.	±% p.a.
1968	651	—
1975	652	+0.02%
1982	677	+0.54%
1990	701	+0.44%
1999	676	−0.40%
2007	879	+3.34%
2012	942	+1.39%
2017	940	−0.04%
2023	862	−1.43%
Source: INSEE

== See also ==
- Communes of the Loir-et-Cher department
