= Neuvy, Loir-et-Cher =

Neuvy
- Commune
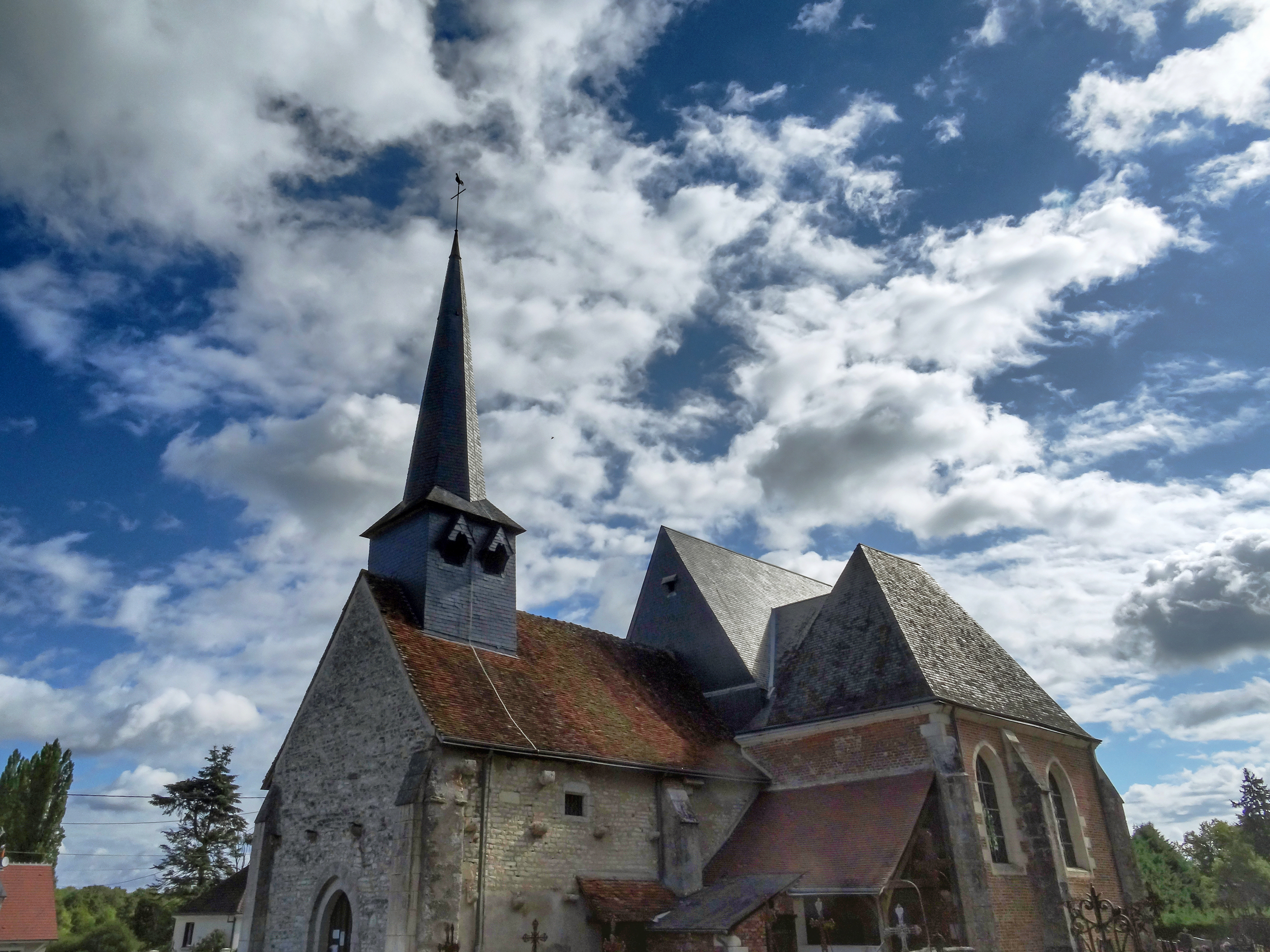
- Location of Neuvy
- Location within France Location within Centre-Val de Loire
- Coordinates: 47°33′50″N 1°36′13″E
- Country: France
- Region: Centre-Val de Loire
- Department: Loir-et-Cher
- Arrondissement: Blois
- Canton: Chambord

Government
  - Mayor (2020–2026): Patrick Marion
- Area^{1}: 31.28 km^{2} (12.08 sq mi)
- Elevation: 82 m (269 ft)
- Highest elevation: 128 m (420 ft)
- Lowest elevation: 77 m (253 ft)
- Population (2023): 311
  - Density: 9.94/km^{2} (25.8/sq mi)
- Time zone: UTC+01:00 (CET)
  - Summer (DST): UTC+02:00 (CEST)
- INSEE/Postal code: 41160 /41250
- ^{1} French Land Register data, which excludes lakes, ponds, glaciers > 1 km^{2} (0.386 sq mi or 247 acres) and river estuaries.

Neuvy (French pronunciation: [nøvi]) is a commune in the Loir-et-Cher department, central France.

== Population ==
Historical population
Year	Pop.	±% p.a.
1968	329	—
1975	288	−1.88%
1982	279	−0.45%
1990	288	+0.40%
1999	294	+0.23%
2007	325	+1.26%
2012	320	−0.31%
2017	319	−0.06%
2023	311	−0.42%
Source: INSEE

== See also ==
- Communes of the Loir-et-Cher department
