= Villeneuve-Frouville =

- Commune
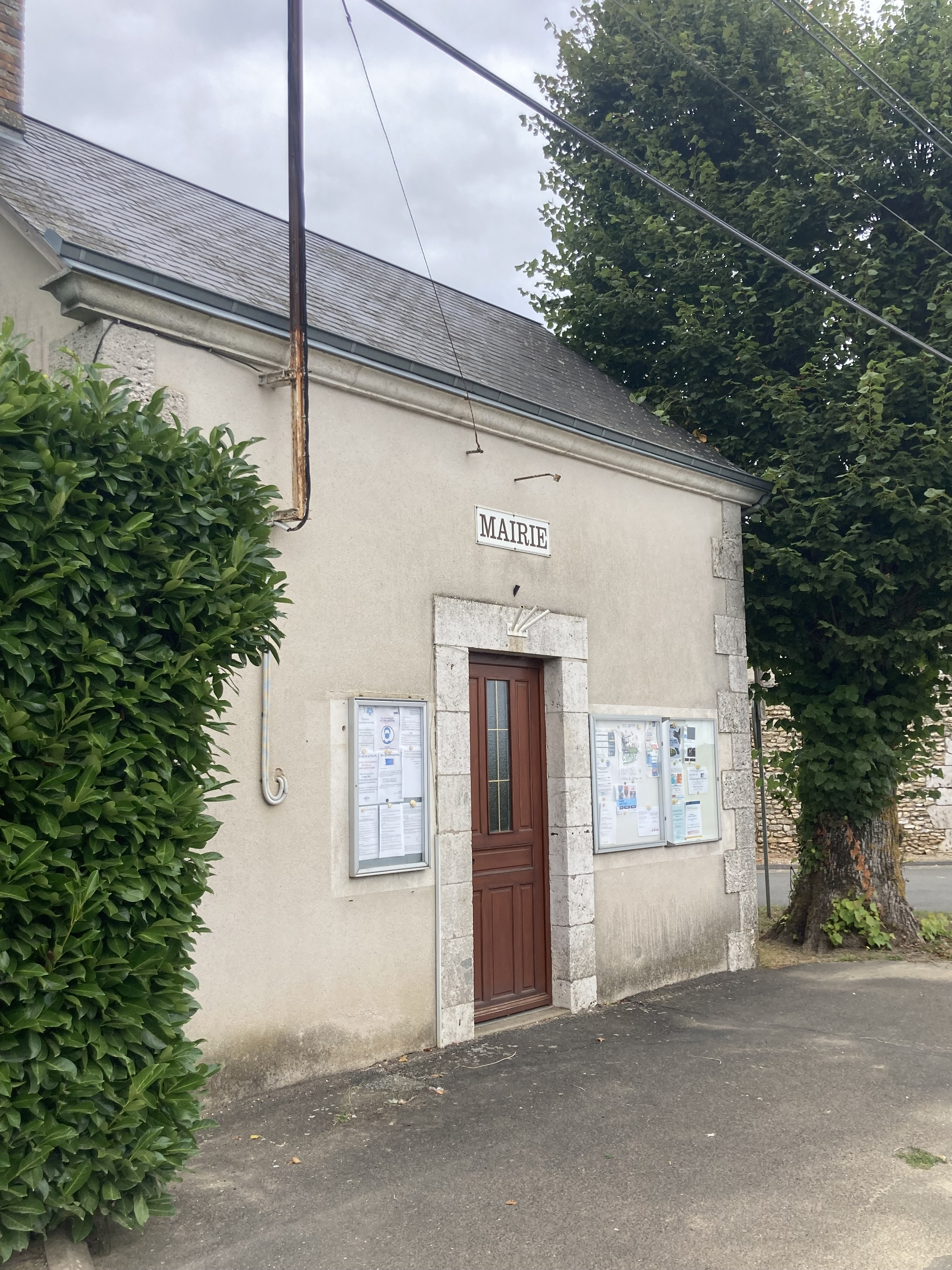
- Town hall
- Location of Villeneuve-Frouville
- Location within France Location within Centre-Val de Loire
- Coordinates: 47°47′15″N 1°18′35″E
- Country: France
- Region: Centre-Val de Loire
- Department: Loir-et-Cher
- Arrondissement: Blois
- Canton: La Beauce
- Intercommunality: Beauce Val de Loire

Government
  - Mayor (2020–2026): Pierre de Puymaly
- Area^{1}: 4.36 km^{2} (1.68 sq mi)
- Elevation: 122 m (400 ft)
- Highest elevation: 125 m (410 ft)
- Lowest elevation: 114 m (374 ft)
- Population (2023): 63
  - Density: 14/km^{2} (37/sq mi)
- Time zone: UTC+01:00 (CET)
  - Summer (DST): UTC+02:00 (CEST)
- INSEE/Postal code: 41284 /41290
- ^{1} French Land Register data, which excludes lakes, ponds, glaciers > 1 km^{2} (0.386 sq mi or 247 acres) and river estuaries.

Villeneuve-Frouville (French pronunciation: [vilnœv fʁuvil]) is a commune in the Loir-et-Cher department in central France.

== Population ==
Historical population
Year	Pop.	±% p.a.
1968	105	—
1975	89	−2.33%
1982	77	−2.05%
1990	70	−1.18%
1999	70	+0.00%
2007	72	+0.35%
2012	65	−2.02%
2017	61	−1.26%
2023	63	+0.54%
Source: INSEE

== See also ==
- Communes of the Loir-et-Cher department
