= Binas, Loir-et-Cher =

Binas
- Commune
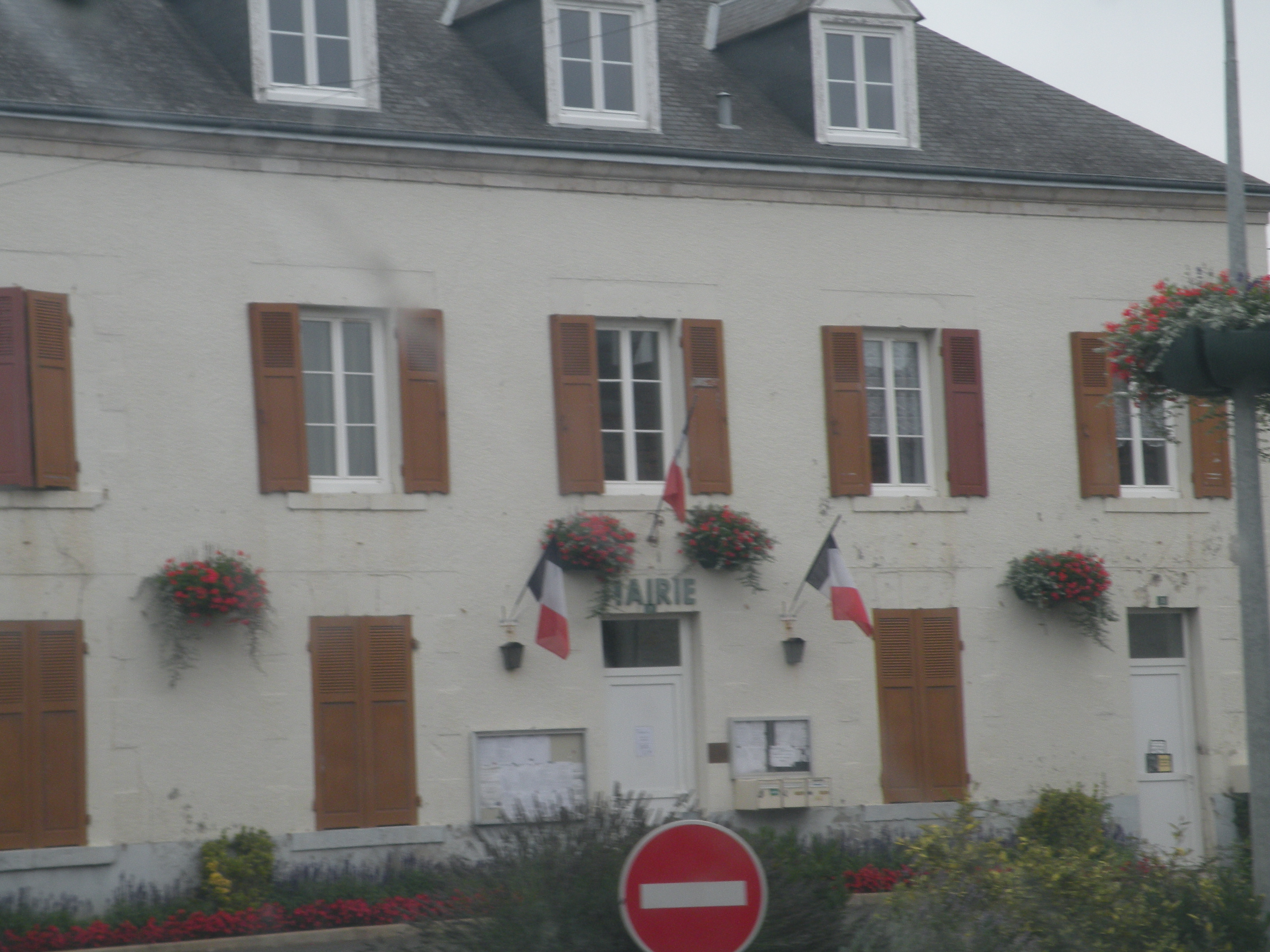
- Town hall

- Coat of arms
- Location of Binas
- Location within France Location within Centre-Val de Loire
- Coordinates: 47°54′15″N 1°27′48″E
- Country: France
- Region: Centre-Val de Loire
- Department: Loir-et-Cher
- Arrondissement: Blois
- Canton: La Beauce

Government
  - Mayor (2020–2026): Solange Vallée
- Area^{1}: 26.38 km^{2} (10.19 sq mi)
- Elevation: 128 m (420 ft)
- Highest elevation: 133 m (436 ft)
- Lowest elevation: 120 m (390 ft)
- Population (2023): 674
  - Density: 25.5/km^{2} (66.2/sq mi)
- Time zone: UTC+01:00 (CET)
  - Summer (DST): UTC+02:00 (CEST)
- INSEE/Postal code: 41017 /41240
- ^{1} French Land Register data, which excludes lakes, ponds, glaciers > 1 km^{2} (0.386 sq mi or 247 acres) and river estuaries.

Binas is a commune in the Loir-et-Cher department in central France.

== Population ==
Historical population

Year	Pop.	±% p.a.
1793	1,040	—
1800	952	−1.26%
1806	900	−0.93%
1821	917	+0.12%
1831	1,100	+1.84%
1836	1,029	−1.33%
1841	1,159	+2.41%
1846	1,279	+1.99%
1851	1,221	−0.92%
1856	1,307	+1.37%
1861	1,233	−1.16%
1866	1,297	+1.02%
1872	1,300	+0.04%
1876	1,235	−1.27%
1881	1,226	−0.15%
1886	1,167	−0.98%
1891	1,141	−0.45%
1896	1,074	−1.20%
1901	1,085	+0.20%

Year	Pop.	±% p.a.
1906	1,101	+0.29%
1911	1,071	−0.55%
1921	963	−1.06%
1926	962	−0.02%
1931	966	+0.08%
1936	900	−1.41%
1946	902	+0.02%
1954	871	−0.44%
1962	866	−0.07%
1968	813	−1.05%
1975	746	−1.22%
1982	689	−1.13%
1990	601	−1.69%
1999	593	−0.15%
2007	703	+2.15%
2012	722	+0.53%
2017	686	−1.02%
2023	674	−0.29%

Source: EHESS and INSEE

== See also ==
- Communes of the Loir-et-Cher department
