= Suèvres =

- Commune
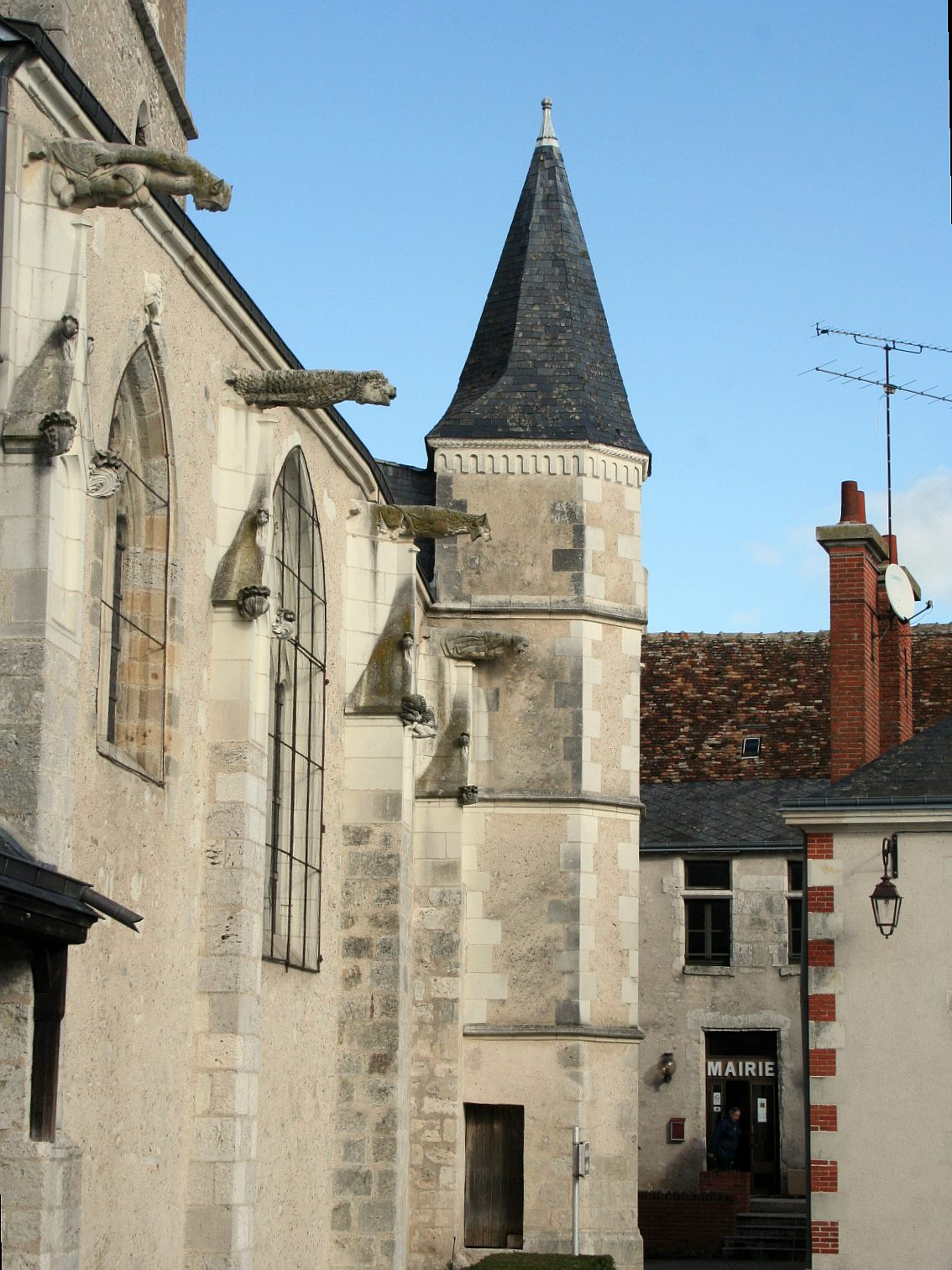
- Church and town hall

- Coat of arms
- Location of Suèvres
- Location within France Location within Centre-Val de Loire
- Coordinates: 47°40′02″N 1°27′42″E
- Country: France
- Region: Centre-Val de Loire
- Department: Loir-et-Cher
- Arrondissement: Blois
- Canton: La Beauce
- Intercommunality: Beauce Val de Loire

Government
  - Mayor (2020–2026): Frédéric Dejente
- Area^{1}: 36.65 km^{2} (14.15 sq mi)
- Elevation: 95 m (312 ft)
- Highest elevation: 119 m (390 ft)
- Lowest elevation: 71 m (233 ft)
- Population (2023): 1,564
  - Density: 42.67/km^{2} (110.5/sq mi)
- Demonym: Sodobrien·ne
- Time zone: UTC+01:00 (CET)
  - Summer (DST): UTC+02:00 (CEST)
- INSEE/Postal code: 41252 /41500
- ^{1} French Land Register data, which excludes lakes, ponds, glaciers > 1 km^{2} (0.386 sq mi or 247 acres) and river estuaries.

Suèvres (French pronunciation: [sɥɛvʁ]) is a commune of the Loir-et-Cher department, Centre-Val de Loire, France.

== Population ==
Historical population
Year	Pop.	±% p.a.
1968	1,244	—
1975	1,147	−1.15%
1982	1,307	+1.88%
1990	1,360	+0.50%
1999	1,371	+0.09%
2007	1,447	+0.68%
2012	1,575	+1.71%
2017	1,693	+1.46%
2023	1,564	−1.31%
Source: INSEE

== See also ==
- Communes of the Loir-et-Cher department
