= Saint-Laurent-des-Bois, Loir-et-Cher =

Saint-Laurent-des-Bois
- Commune
- Coat of arms
- Location of Saint-Laurent-des-Bois
- Location within France Location within Centre-Val de Loire
- Coordinates: 47°51′05″N 1°26′55″E
- Country: France
- Region: Centre-Val de Loire
- Department: Loir-et-Cher
- Arrondissement: Blois
- Canton: La Beauce
- Intercommunality: Terres du Val de Loire

Government
  - Mayor (2020–2026): Roger Bauné
- Area^{1}: 18.32 km^{2} (7.07 sq mi)
- Elevation: 145 m (476 ft)
- Highest elevation: 152 m (499 ft)
- Lowest elevation: 123 m (404 ft)
- Population (2023): 330
  - Density: 18/km^{2} (47/sq mi)
- Time zone: UTC+01:00 (CET)
  - Summer (DST): UTC+02:00 (CEST)
- INSEE/Postal code: 41219 /41240
- ^{1} French Land Register data, which excludes lakes, ponds, glaciers > 1 km^{2} (0.386 sq mi or 247 acres) and river estuaries.

Saint-Laurent-des-Bois (French pronunciation: [sɛ̃ loʁɑ̃ de bwa]) is a commune in the Loir-et-Cher department in central France.

== Population ==
Historical population
Year	Pop.	±% p.a.
1968	312	—
1975	271	−1.99%
1982	250	−1.15%
1990	209	−2.21%
1999	227	+0.92%
2007	253	+1.36%
2012	303	+3.67%
2017	287	−1.08%
2023	330	+2.35%
Source: INSEE

== See also ==
- Communes of the Loir-et-Cher department
