= Alex Binas =

Greek footballer (born 1990)

Personal information
- Full name: Alexandros Binas
- Date of birth: 6 January 1990 (age 36)
- Place of birth: Athens, Greece
- Height: 1.75 m (5 ft 9 in)
- Position: Midfielder

Team information
- Current team: Thiella Agiou Dimitriou
- Number: 10

Youth career
- Panionios F

Senior career*
Years	Team	Apps	(Gls)
2009–2010	Athinaikos		
2011	Pao Rouf		
2011	Elpidoforos		
2011–2013	Pao Rouf		
2013–2015	Ethnikos Asteras		
2015–	Thiella Agiou Dimitriou		
- * Club domestic league appearances and goals as of 2 June 2015

Alexandros Binas (Greek: Αλέξανδρος Μπίνας, born 6 January 1990) in Athens is a Greek footballer who plays for Thiella Agiou Dimitriou as midfielder.
