= Lignières =

Lignières may refer to the following places:

== Belgium ==
- Lignières, Wallonia, a hamlet in Marche-en-Famenne, Wallonia

== France ==
- Lignières, Aube
- Lignières, Cher
- Lignières, Loir-et-Cher
- Lignières, Somme
- Lignières-de-Touraine

== Switzerland ==
- Lignières, Neuchâtel

== See also ==
- Lignères, Orne department, France
