= Sargé-sur-Braye =

- Commune
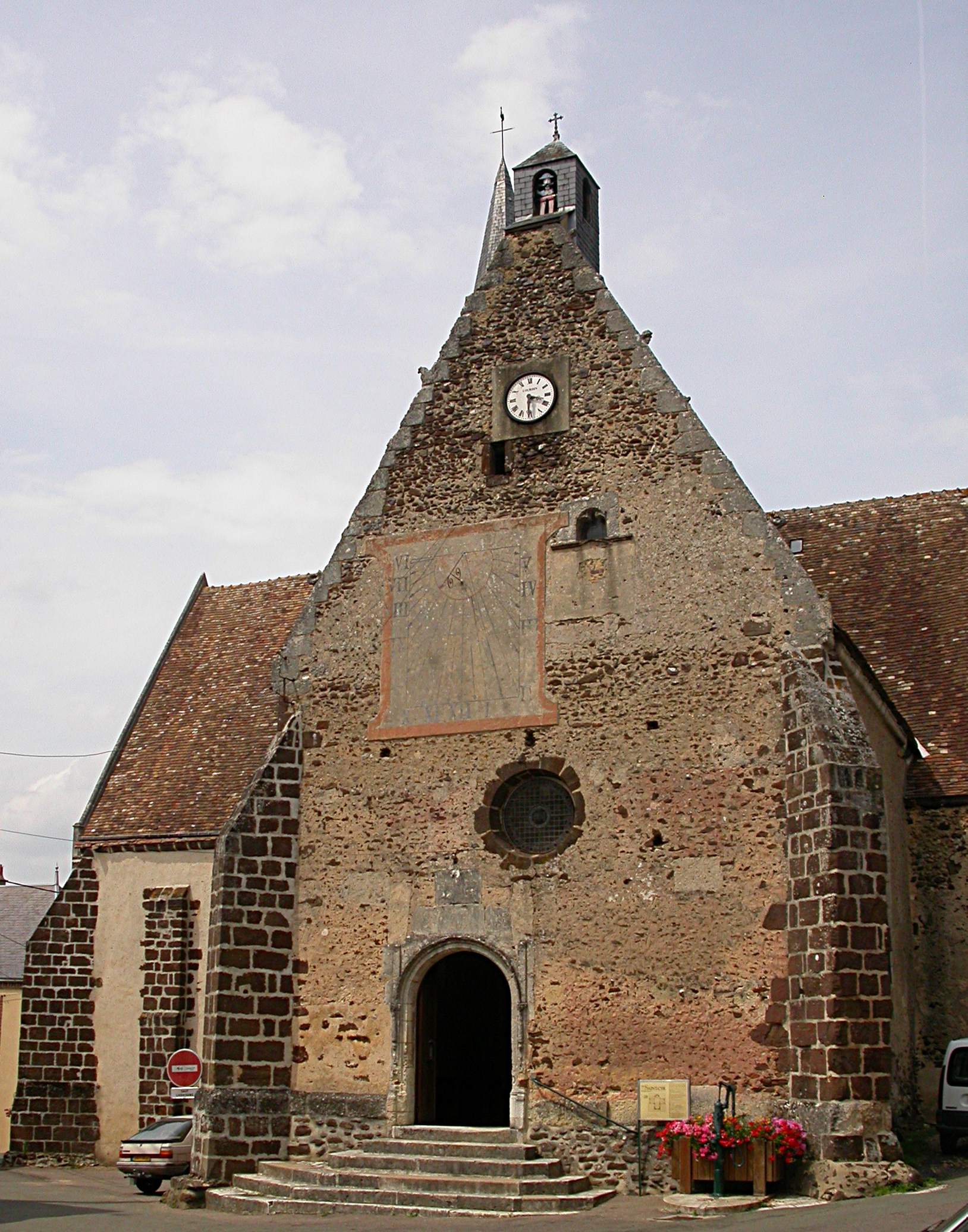
- Church of Saint-Cyr

- Coat of arms
- Location of Sargé-sur-Braye
- Location within France Location within Centre-Val de Loire
- Coordinates: 47°55′28″N 0°51′14″E
- Country: France
- Region: Centre-Val de Loire
- Department: Loir-et-Cher
- Arrondissement: Vendôme
- Canton: Le Perche
- Intercommunality: Collines du Perche

Government
  - Mayor (2020–2026): Martine Rousseau
- Area^{1}: 42.61 km^{2} (16.45 sq mi)
- Elevation: 90 m (300 ft)
- Highest elevation: 202 m (663 ft)
- Lowest elevation: 78 m (256 ft)
- Population (2023): 945
  - Density: 22.2/km^{2} (57.4/sq mi)
- Demonym(s): Sergetier, Sergetière
- Time zone: UTC+01:00 (CET)
  - Summer (DST): UTC+02:00 (CEST)
- INSEE/Postal code: 41235 /41170
- ^{1} French Land Register data, which excludes lakes, ponds, glaciers > 1 km^{2} (0.386 sq mi or 247 acres) and river estuaries.

Sargé-sur-Braye (French pronunciation: [saʁʒe syʁ bʁɛ]; lit. 'Sargé on Braye') is a commune in the French department of Loir-et-Cher, administrative region of Centre-Val de Loire, France.

== Geography ==
The commune is bathed by the Braye and the Grenne rivers, which join here before leading as the Braye to the Loir. The town is a part of the canton of Le Perche. It is bordered to the north by Cormenon, to the south by Savigny-sur-Braye, to the east by Épuisay and to the west by Saint-Calais.

== History ==
Between 29 January and 8 February 1939, more than 3,100 Spanish refugees fleeing the collapse of the Spanish Republic under Franco, arrived in Loir-et-Cher. Faced with a lack of buildings to welcome them (the stud farm at Selles-sur-Cher had been used), 47 villages provide accommodation, including Sargé-sur-Braye. The refugees, essentially women and children, were subjected to a strict quarantine and vaccinated. Mail was limited. Supplies, though lacking variety and cooked the French way, were, however, assured. In the spring and summer, the refugees were regrouped at Bois-Brûlé (commune of Boisseau).

== Population ==
Historical population
Year	Pop.	±% p.a.
1968	991	—
1975	911	−1.20%
1982	974	+0.96%
1990	988	+0.18%
1999	974	−0.16%
2007	934	−0.52%
2012	1,045	+2.27%
2017	1,041	−0.08%
2023	945	−1.60%
Source: INSEE

== Sights ==
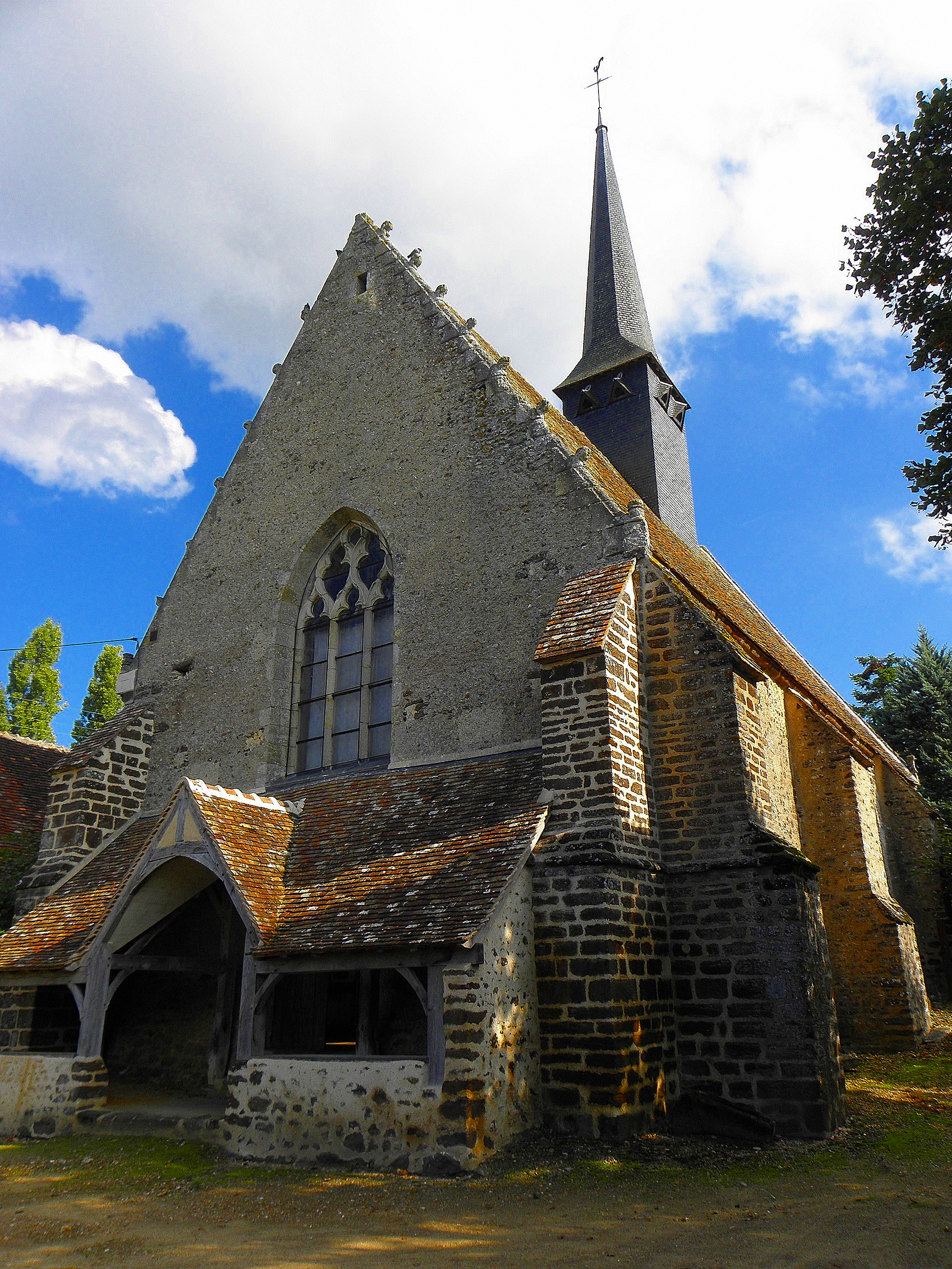
Saint-Martin church

- Église Saint-Martin. This church been listed since 1958 as a historic monument by the French Ministry of Culture. Dating originally from the 10th century, its present form is from 1549. There are traces of 14th century painted murals.
- Église Saint-Cyr, and its jacquemart.
- Château des Radrets has been listed since 1977 as a monument historique. Parts of it date back to the 15th century; it was extensively altered in the 18th.
- Château de Montmarin has been listed since 1986 as a monument historique. Originally 17th century, it was altered in the 18th and 19th.
- Château du Fief Corbin
- Roussard quarry

== See also ==
- Braye (river)
- Communes of the Loir-et-Cher department
