= La Chapelle-Vicomtesse =

- Commune
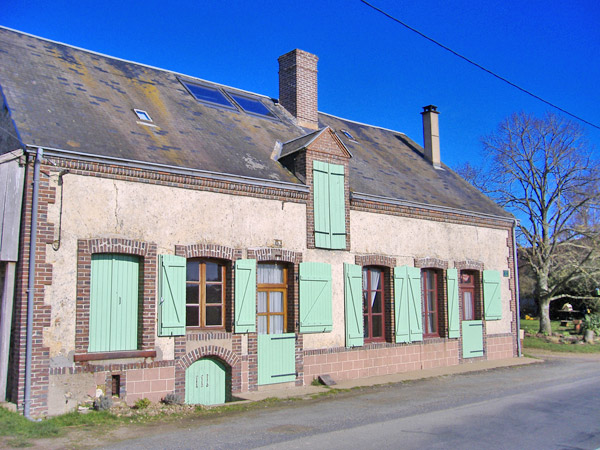
- The main building of Le Safran de la Chapelle-Vicomtesse

- Coat of arms
- Location of La Chapelle-Vicomtesse
- Location within France Location within Centre-Val de Loire
- Coordinates: 47°59′30″N 1°02′10″E
- Country: France
- Region: Centre-Val de Loire
- Department: Loir-et-Cher
- Arrondissement: Vendôme
- Canton: Le Perche
- Intercommunality: Perche et Haut Vendômois

Government
  - Mayor (2020–2026): Yves Beloeil
- Area^{1}: 15.03 km^{2} (5.80 sq mi)
- Elevation: 188 m (617 ft)
- Highest elevation: 243 m (797 ft)
- Lowest elevation: 155 m (509 ft)
- Population (2023): 164
  - Density: 10.9/km^{2} (28.3/sq mi)
- Time zone: UTC+01:00 (CET)
  - Summer (DST): UTC+02:00 (CEST)
- INSEE/Postal code: 41041 /41270
- ^{1} French Land Register data, which excludes lakes, ponds, glaciers > 1 km^{2} (0.386 sq mi or 247 acres) and river estuaries.

La Chapelle-Vicomtesse (French pronunciation: [la ʃapɛl vikɔ̃tɛs]) is a commune in the Loir-et-Cher department in central France.

== Population ==
Historical population
Year	Pop.	±% p.a.
1968	330	—
1975	241	−4.39%
1982	187	−3.56%
1990	174	−0.90%
1999	165	−0.59%
2007	183	+1.30%
2012	182	−0.11%
2017	169	−1.47%
2023	164	−0.50%
Source: INSEE

== See also ==
- Communes of the Loir-et-Cher department
