= Busloup =

- Commune
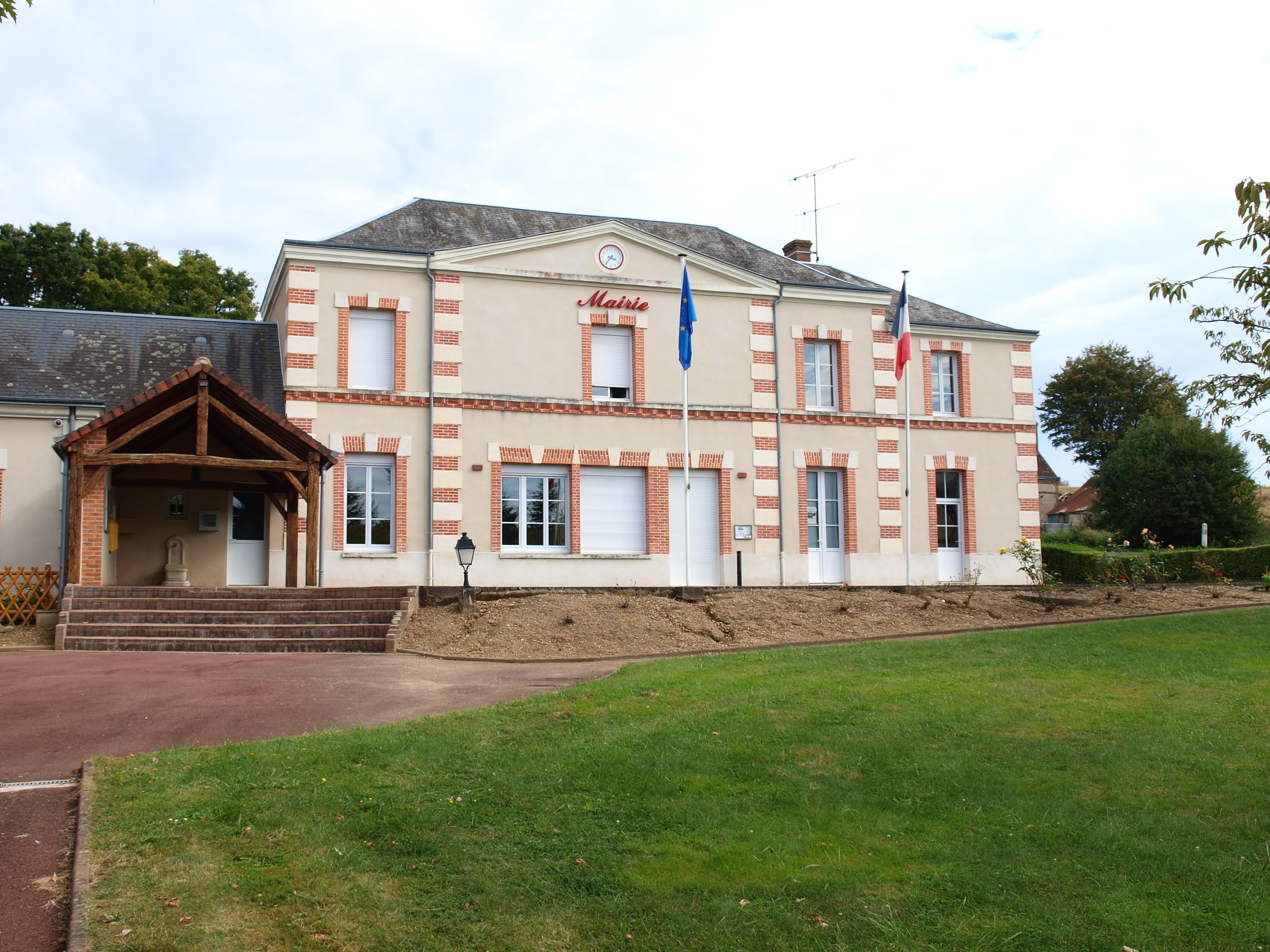
- Town hall

- Coat of arms
- Location of Busloup
- Location within France Location within Centre-Val de Loire
- Coordinates: 47°53′39″N 1°07′58″E
- Country: France
- Region: Centre-Val de Loire
- Department: Loir-et-Cher
- Arrondissement: Vendôme
- Canton: Le Perche
- Intercommunality: Perche et Haut Vendômois

Government
  - Mayor (2020–2026): Marcel Defremont
- Area^{1}: 18.94 km^{2} (7.31 sq mi)
- Elevation: 111 m (364 ft)
- Highest elevation: 162 m (531 ft)
- Lowest elevation: 88 m (289 ft)
- Population (2023): 494
  - Density: 26.1/km^{2} (67.6/sq mi)
- Time zone: UTC+01:00 (CET)
  - Summer (DST): UTC+02:00 (CEST)
- INSEE/Postal code: 41028 /41160
- ^{1} French Land Register data, which excludes lakes, ponds, glaciers > 1 km^{2} (0.386 sq mi or 247 acres) and river estuaries.

Busloup is a commune in the Loir-et-Cher department in central France.

== Population ==
Historical population
Year	Pop.	±% p.a.
1968	332	—
1975	309	−1.02%
1982	336	+1.20%
1990	361	+0.90%
1999	379	+0.54%
2007	448	+2.11%
2012	433	−0.68%
2017	439	+0.28%
2023	494	+1.99%
Source: INSEE

== See also ==
- Communes of the Loir-et-Cher department
