= Romilly, Loir-et-Cher =

Romilly
- Commune
- Coat of arms
- Location of Romilly
- Location within France Location within Centre-Val de Loire
- Coordinates: 47°57′N 1°02′E
- Country: France
- Region: Centre-Val de Loire
- Department: Loir-et-Cher
- Arrondissement: Vendôme
- Canton: Le Perche
- Intercommunality: Perche et Haut Vendômois

Government
  - Mayor (2020–2026): Régine Vassaux
- Area^{1}: 14.9 km^{2} (5.8 sq mi)
- Elevation: 180 m (590 ft)
- Highest elevation: 210 m (690 ft)
- Lowest elevation: 144 m (472 ft)
- Population (2023): 155
  - Density: 10.4/km^{2} (26.9/sq mi)
- Time zone: UTC+01:00 (CET)
  - Summer (DST): UTC+02:00 (CEST)
- INSEE/Postal code: 41193 /41270
- ^{1} French Land Register data, which excludes lakes, ponds, glaciers > 1 km^{2} (0.386 sq mi or 247 acres) and river estuaries.

Romilly (French pronunciation: [ʁɔmiji]) is a commune in the Loir-et-Cher department in central France.

== Population ==
Historical population
Year	Pop.	±% p.a.
1968	216	—
1975	209	−0.47%
1982	200	−0.63%
1990	189	−0.70%
1999	169	−1.24%
2007	136	−2.68%
2012	187	+6.58%
2017	140	−5.62%
2023	155	+1.71%
Source: INSEE

== In media ==
In the movie Passage to Marseille, the character Jean Matrac, who is in the Free French Air Forces, after each of several missions, flies over Romilly to a drop a message to his wife Paula and their son Jean, who live in the town. Humphrey Bogart played Matrac. Michèle Morgan played Paula and Peter Miles played Jean, Jr.

== See also ==
- Communes of the Loir-et-Cher department
