= Rahart =

- Commune
- Coat of arms
- Location of Rahart
- Location within France Location within Centre-Val de Loire
- Coordinates: 47°52′15″N 1°04′07″E
- Country: France
- Region: Centre-Val de Loire
- Department: Loir-et-Cher
- Arrondissement: Vendôme
- Canton: Le Perche
- Intercommunality: CA Territoires Vendômois

Government
  - Mayor (2020–2026): Caroline Lemaître
- Area^{1}: 14.23 km^{2} (5.49 sq mi)
- Elevation: 140 m (460 ft)
- Highest elevation: 154 m (505 ft)
- Lowest elevation: 108 m (354 ft)
- Population (2023): 300
  - Density: 21/km^{2} (55/sq mi)
- Time zone: UTC+01:00 (CET)
  - Summer (DST): UTC+02:00 (CEST)
- INSEE/Postal code: 41186 /41160
- ^{1} French Land Register data, which excludes lakes, ponds, glaciers > 1 km^{2} (0.386 sq mi or 247 acres) and river estuaries.

Rahart (French pronunciation: [ʁa.aʁ]) is a commune in the Loir-et-Cher department in central France.

== Population ==
Historical population
Year	Pop.	±% p.a.
1968	245	—
1975	198	−3.00%
1982	229	+2.10%
1990	253	+1.25%
1999	256	+0.13%
2007	261	+0.24%
2012	292	+2.27%
2017	325	+2.16%
2023	300	−1.33%
Source: INSEE

== See also ==
- Communes of the Loir-et-Cher department
