= Arrondissement of Vendôme =

Coordinates: 47.80°N 1.07°E

Vendôme
- Arrondissement
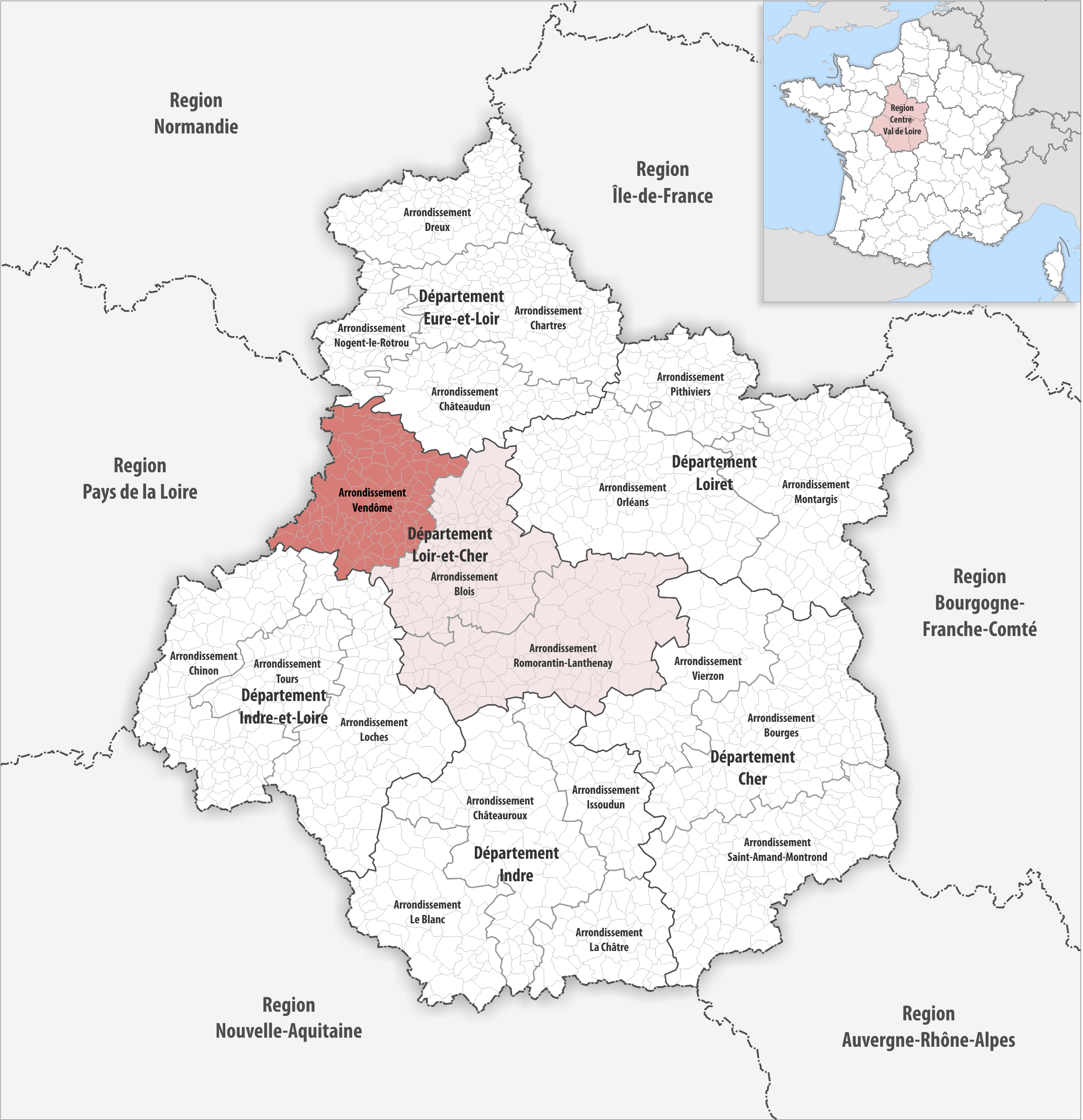
- Location within the region Centre-Val de Loire
- Country: France
- Region: Centre-Val de Loire
- Department: Loir-et-Cher
- No. of communes: {{{nbcomm}}}
- Area: 1,722.3 km^{2} (665.0 sq mi)
- Population (2023): 67,208
  - Density: 39.022/km^{2} (101.07/sq mi)
- INSEE code: 412

The Arrondissement of Vendôme (French: arrondissement de Vendôme) is an arrondissement of France, located in the Loir-et-Cher departement, region of Centre-Val de Loire. It has 100 communes. Its population is 67,408 (2021), and its area is 1,722.3 km^{2} (665.0 sq mi).

== Composition ==
The communes of the arrondissement of Vendôme, and their INSEE codes, are:

1. Ambloy (41001)
2. Areines (41003)
3. Artins (41004)
4. Authon (41007)
5. Azé (41010)
6. Baillou (41012)
7. Beauchêne (41014)
8. Bonneveau (41020)
9. Bouffry (41022)
10. Boursay (41024)
11. Brévainville (41026)
12. Busloup (41028)
13. Cellé (41030)
14. La Chapelle-Enchérie (41037)
15. La Chapelle-Vicomtesse (41041)
16. Chauvigny-du-Perche (41048)
17. Choue (41053)
18. Cormenon (41060)
19. Couëtron-au-Perche (41248)
20. Coulommiers-la-Tour (41065)
21. Crucheray (41072)
22. Danzé (41073)
23. Droué (41075)
24. Épuisay (41078)
25. Les Essarts (41079)
26. Faye (41081)
27. Fontaine-les-Coteaux (41087)
28. Fontaine-Raoul (41088)
29. La Fontenelle (41089)
30. Fortan (41090)
31. Fréteval (41095)
32. Le Gault-du-Perche (41096)
33. Gombergean (41098)
34. Les Hayes (41100)
35. Houssay (41102)
36. Huisseau-en-Beauce (41103)
37. Lancé (41107)
38. Lavardin (41113)
39. Lignières (41115)
40. Lisle (41116)
41. Lunay (41120)
42. Marcilly-en-Beauce (41124)
43. Mazangé (41131)
44. Meslay (41138)
45. Moisy (41141)
46. Mondoubleau (41143)
47. Montoire-sur-le-Loir (41149)
48. Montrouveau (41153)
49. Morée (41154)
50. Naveil (41158)
51. Nourray (41163)
52. Ouzouer-le-Doyen (41172)
53. Périgny (41174)
54. Pezou (41175)
55. Le Plessis-Dorin (41177)
56. Le Poislay (41179)
57. Pray (41182)
58. Prunay-Cassereau (41184)
59. Rahart (41186)
60. Renay (41187)
61. Rocé (41190)
62. Les Roches-l'Évêque (41192)
63. Romilly (41193)
64. Ruan-sur-Egvonne (41196)
65. Saint-Amand-Longpré (41199)
66. Saint-Arnoult (41201)
67. Sainte-Anne (41200)
68. Saint-Firmin-des-Prés (41209)
69. Saint-Gourgon (41213)
70. Saint-Hilaire-la-Gravelle (41214)
71. Saint-Jacques-des-Guérets (41215)
72. Saint-Jean-Froidmentel (41216)
73. Saint-Marc-du-Cor (41224)
74. Saint-Martin-des-Bois (41225)
75. Saint-Ouen (41226)
76. Saint-Rimay (41228)
77. Sargé-sur-Braye (41235)
78. Sasnières (41236)
79. Savigny-sur-Braye (41238)
80. Selommes (41243)
81. Sougé (41250)
82. Le Temple (41254)
83. Ternay (41255)
84. Thoré-la-Rochette (41259)
85. Tourailles (41261)
86. Troo (41265)
87. Vallée-de-Ronsard (41070)
88. Vendôme (41269)
89. Villavard (41274)
90. La Ville-aux-Clercs (41275)
91. Villebout (41277)
92. Villechauve (41278)
93. Villedieu-le-Château (41279)
94. Villemardy (41283)
95. Villeporcher (41286)
96. Villerable (41287)
97. Villeromain (41290)
98. Villetrun (41291)
99. Villiersfaux (41293)
100. Villiers-sur-Loir (41294)

== History ==
The arrondissement of Vendôme was created in 1800. At the January 2017 reorganisation of the arrondissements of Loir-et-Cher, it gained two communes from the arrondissement of Blois, and it lost four communes to the arrondissement of Blois.

As a result of the reorganisation of the cantons of France which came into effect in 2015, the borders of the cantons are no longer related to the borders of the arrondissements. The cantons of the arrondissement of Vendôme were, as of January 2015:

1. Droué
2. Mondoubleau
3. Montoire-sur-le-Loir
4. Morée
5. Saint-Amand-Longpré
6. Savigny-sur-Braye
7. Selommes
8. Vendôme-1
9. Vendôme-2
