= Pezou =

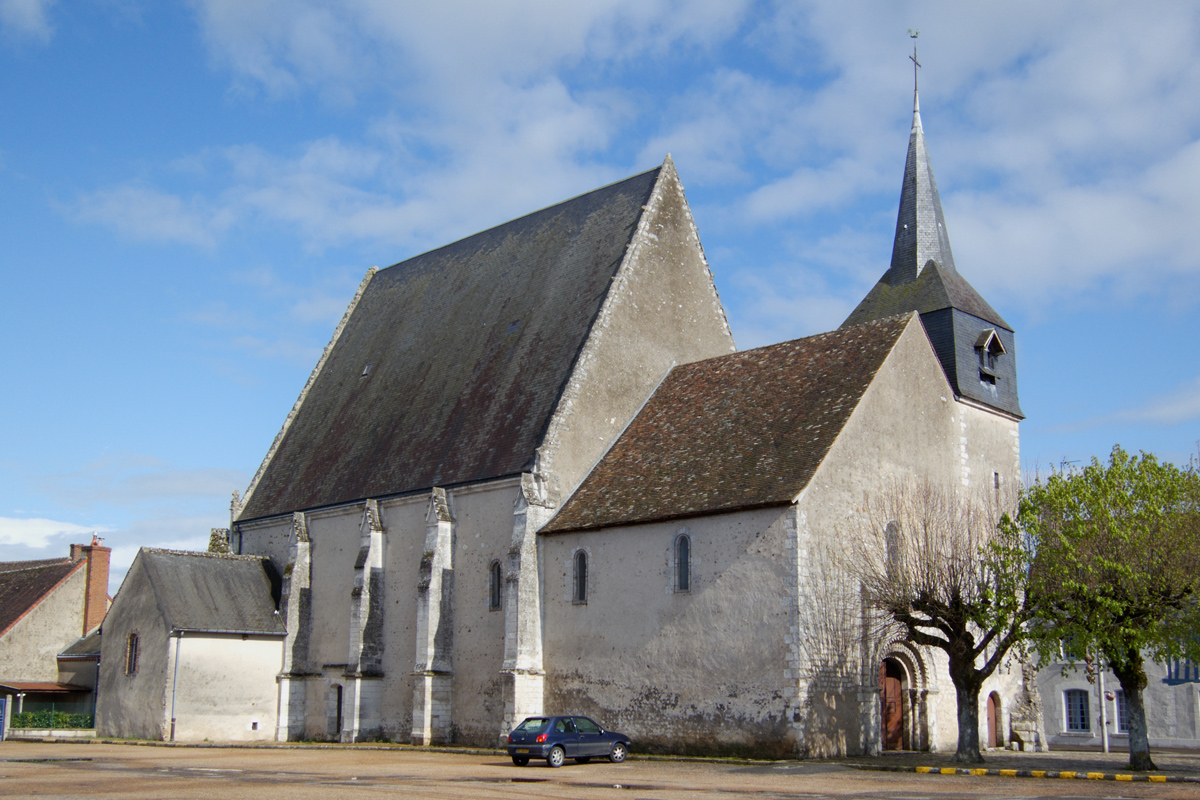
- Church of Saint-Pierre

- Coat of arms
- Location of Pezou
- Location within France Location within Centre-Val de Loire
- Coordinates: 47°52′01″N 1°08′37″E
- Country: France
- Region: Centre-Val de Loire
- Department: Loir-et-Cher
- Arrondissement: Vendôme
- Canton: Le Perche
- Intercommunality: Perche et Haut Vendômois

Government
  - Mayor (2020–2026): Pierre Solon
- Area^{1}: 13.97 km^{2} (5.39 sq mi)
- Elevation: 88 m (289 ft)
- Highest elevation: 148 m (486 ft)
- Lowest elevation: 82 m (269 ft)
- Population (2023): 1,101
  - Density: 78.81/km^{2} (204.1/sq mi)
- Time zone: UTC+01:00 (CET)
  - Summer (DST): UTC+02:00 (CEST)
- INSEE/Postal code: 41175 /41100
- ^{1} French Land Register data, which excludes lakes, ponds, glaciers > 1 km^{2} (0.386 sq mi or 247 acres) and river estuaries.

Pezou (French pronunciation: [pəzu]) is a commune in the Loir-et-Cher department of central France.

== Population ==
Historical population
Year	Pop.	±% p.a.
1968	821	—
1975	813	−0.14%
1982	921	+1.80%
1990	861	−0.84%
1999	938	+0.96%
2007	1,100	+2.01%
2012	1,108	+0.15%
2017	1,119	+0.20%
2023	1,101	−0.27%
Source: INSEE

== See also ==
- Communes of the Loir-et-Cher department
