= Le Temple, Loir-et-Cher =

Le Temple
- Commune
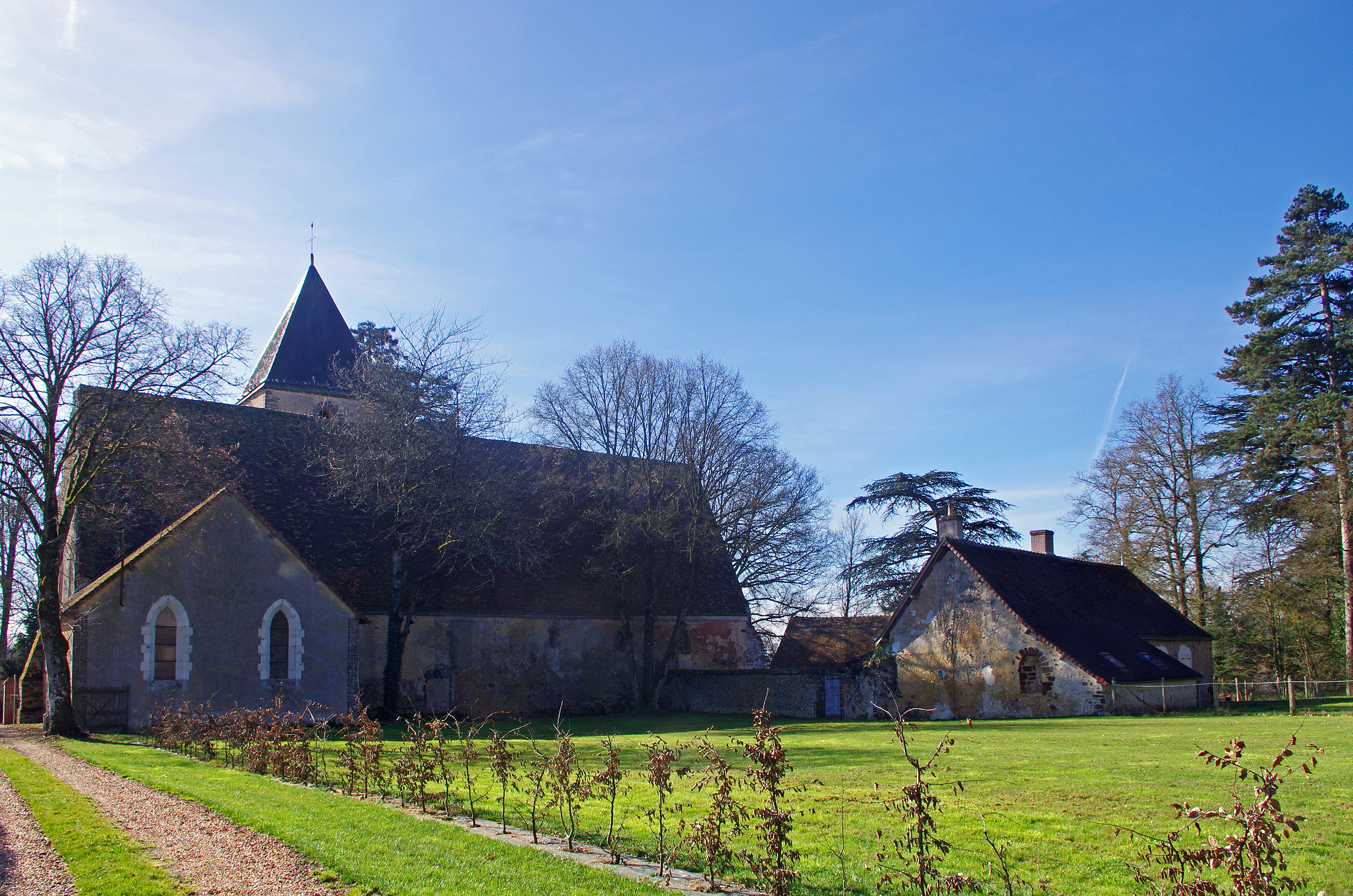

- Coat of arms
- Location of Le Temple
- Location within France Location within Centre-Val de Loire
- Coordinates: 47°55′59″N 0°56′08″E
- Country: France
- Region: Centre-Val de Loire
- Department: Loir-et-Cher
- Arrondissement: Vendôme
- Canton: Le Perche
- Intercommunality: Collines du Perche

Government
  - Mayor (2020–2026): Dany Bouhours
- Area^{1}: 13.32 km^{2} (5.14 sq mi)
- Elevation: 163 m (535 ft)
- Highest elevation: 208 m (682 ft)
- Lowest elevation: 144 m (472 ft)
- Population (2023): 169
  - Density: 12.7/km^{2} (32.9/sq mi)
- Time zone: UTC+01:00 (CET)
  - Summer (DST): UTC+02:00 (CEST)
- INSEE/Postal code: 41254 /41170
- ^{1} French Land Register data, which excludes lakes, ponds, glaciers > 1 km^{2} (0.386 sq mi or 247 acres) and river estuaries.

Le Temple (French pronunciation: [lə tɑ̃pl]; lit. 'The Temple') is a commune of the Loir-et-Cher department in central France.

== Population ==
Historical population
Year	Pop.	±% p.a.
1968	224	—
1975	180	−3.08%
1982	156	−2.02%
1990	150	−0.49%
1999	179	+1.98%
2007	178	−0.07%
2012	176	−0.23%
2017	187	+1.22%
2023	169	−1.67%
Source: INSEE

== See also ==
- Communes of the Loir-et-Cher department
