= Choue =

- Commune
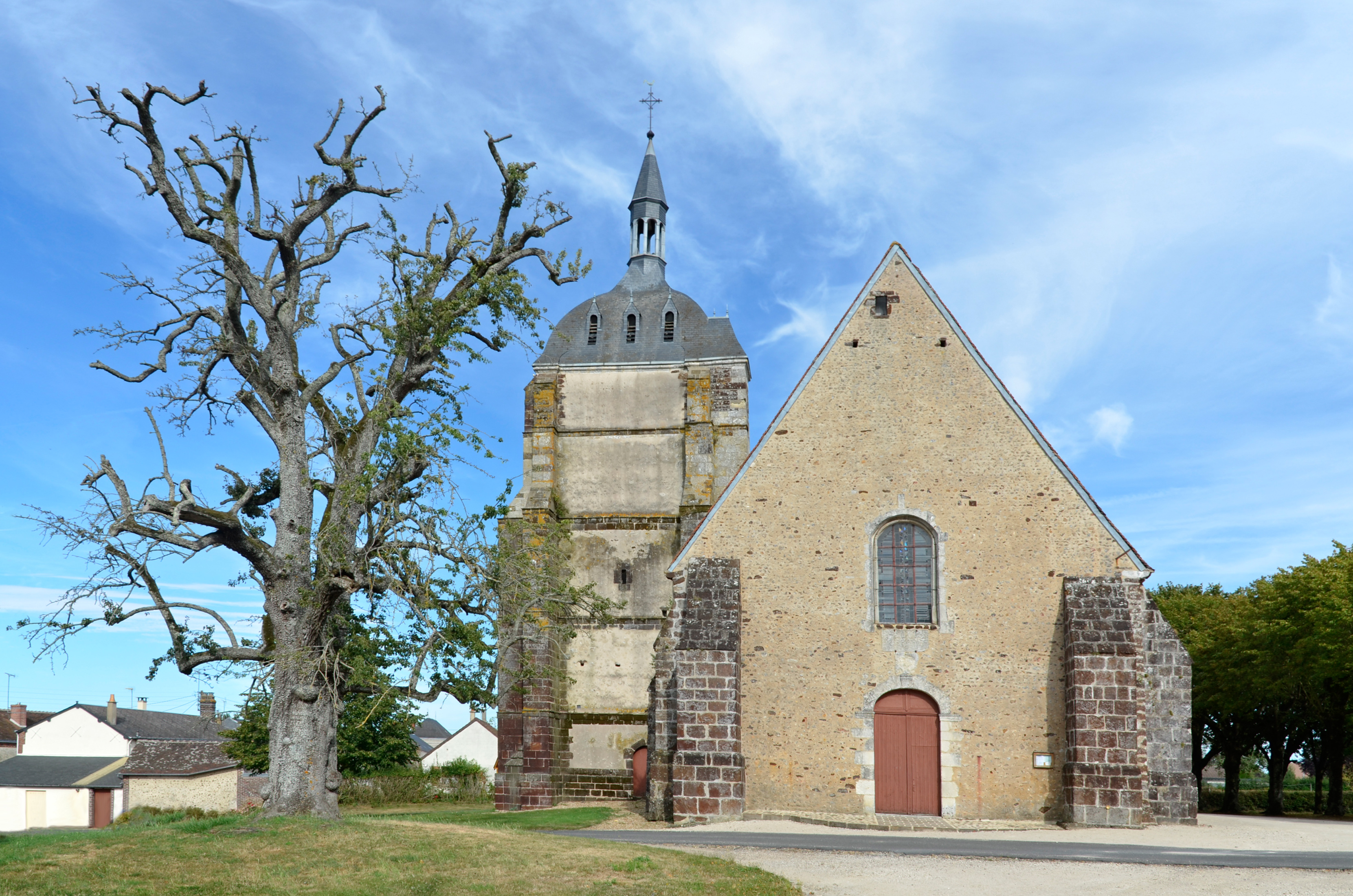

- Coat of arms
- Location of Choue
- Location within France Location within Centre-Val de Loire
- Coordinates: 47°59′57″N 0°55′46″E
- Country: France
- Region: Centre-Val de Loire
- Department: Loir-et-Cher
- Arrondissement: Vendôme
- Canton: Le Perche
- Intercommunality: Collines du Perche

Government
  - Mayor (2020–2026): François Gaullier
- Area^{1}: 37.39 km^{2} (14.44 sq mi)
- Elevation: 136 m (446 ft)
- Highest elevation: 212 m (696 ft)
- Lowest elevation: 112 m (367 ft)
- Population (2023): 512
  - Density: 13.7/km^{2} (35.5/sq mi)
- Time zone: UTC+01:00 (CET)
  - Summer (DST): UTC+02:00 (CEST)
- INSEE/Postal code: 41053 /41170
- ^{1} French Land Register data, which excludes lakes, ponds, glaciers > 1 km^{2} (0.386 sq mi or 247 acres) and river estuaries.

Choue (French pronunciation: [ʃu]) is a commune in the Loir-et-Cher department of central France.

== Population ==
Historical population
Year	Pop.	±% p.a.
1968	602	—
1975	512	−2.29%
1982	562	+1.34%
1990	578	+0.35%
1999	544	−0.67%
2007	527	−0.40%
2012	532	+0.19%
2017	529	−0.11%
2023	512	−0.54%
Source: INSEE

== See also ==
- Communes of the Loir-et-Cher department
