= Brévainville =

- Commune
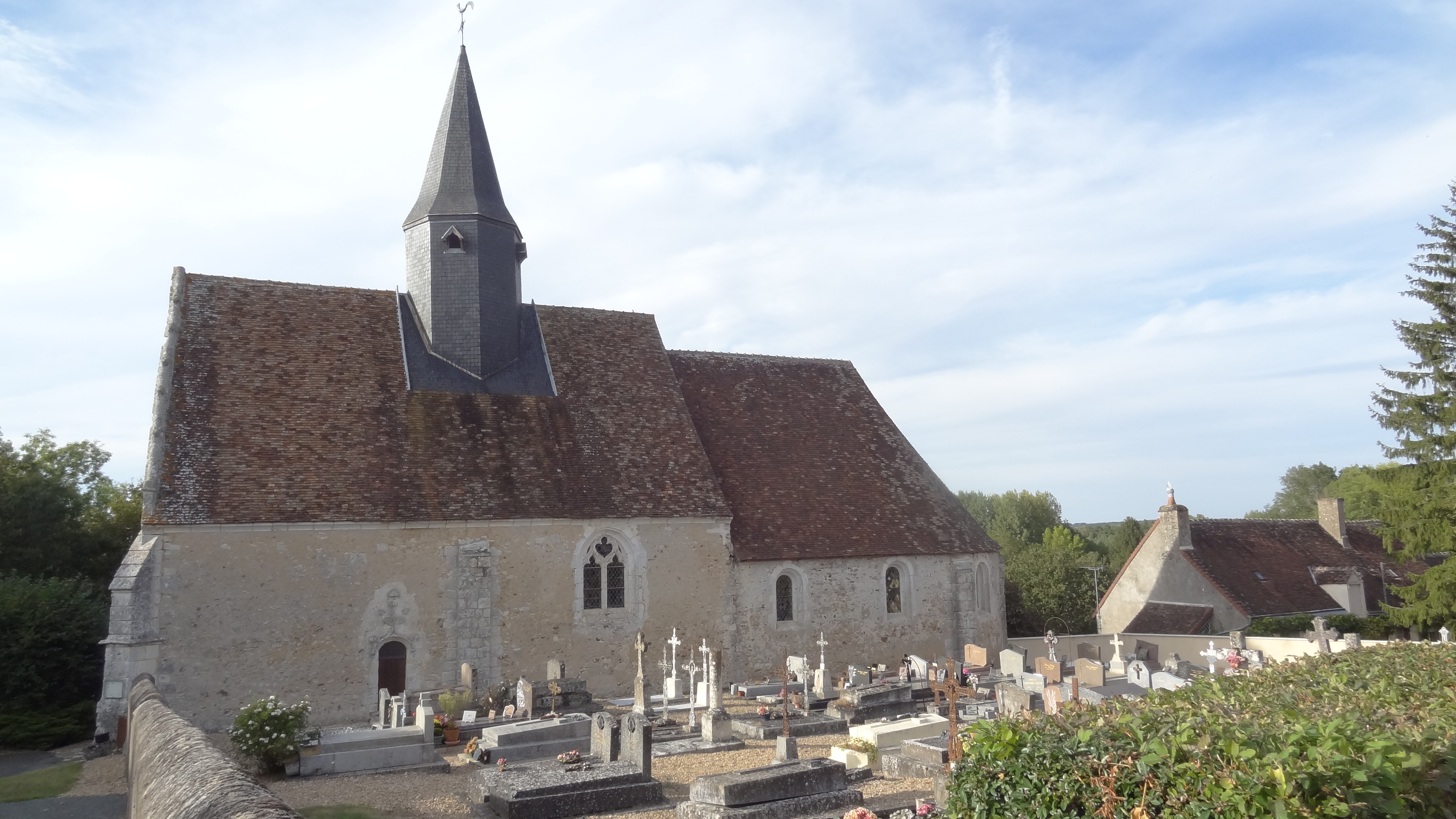
- Church of Saint-Claude

- Coat of arms
- Location of Brévainville
- Location within France Location within Centre-Val de Loire
- Coordinates: 47°57′13″N 1°17′07″E
- Country: France
- Region: Centre-Val de Loire
- Department: Loir-et-Cher
- Arrondissement: Vendôme
- Canton: Le Perche

Government
  - Mayor (2020–2026): Dominique Brunet
- Area^{1}: 16.16 km^{2} (6.24 sq mi)
- Elevation: 134 m (440 ft)
- Highest elevation: 144 m (472 ft)
- Lowest elevation: 88 m (289 ft)
- Population (2023): 159
  - Density: 9.84/km^{2} (25.5/sq mi)
- Time zone: UTC+01:00 (CET)
  - Summer (DST): UTC+02:00 (CEST)
- INSEE/Postal code: 41026 /41160
- ^{1} French Land Register data, which excludes lakes, ponds, glaciers > 1 km^{2} (0.386 sq mi or 247 acres) and river estuaries.

Brévainville (French pronunciation: [bʁevɛ̃vil]) is a commune in the Loir-et-Cher department in central France.

== Population ==
Historical population
Year	Pop.	±% p.a.
1968	256	—
1975	247	−0.51%
1982	206	−2.56%
1990	188	−1.14%
1999	163	−1.57%
2007	174	+0.82%
2012	173	−0.12%
2017	170	−0.35%
2023	159	−1.11%
Source: INSEE

== See also ==
- Communes of the Loir-et-Cher department
