= Cellé =

- Commune
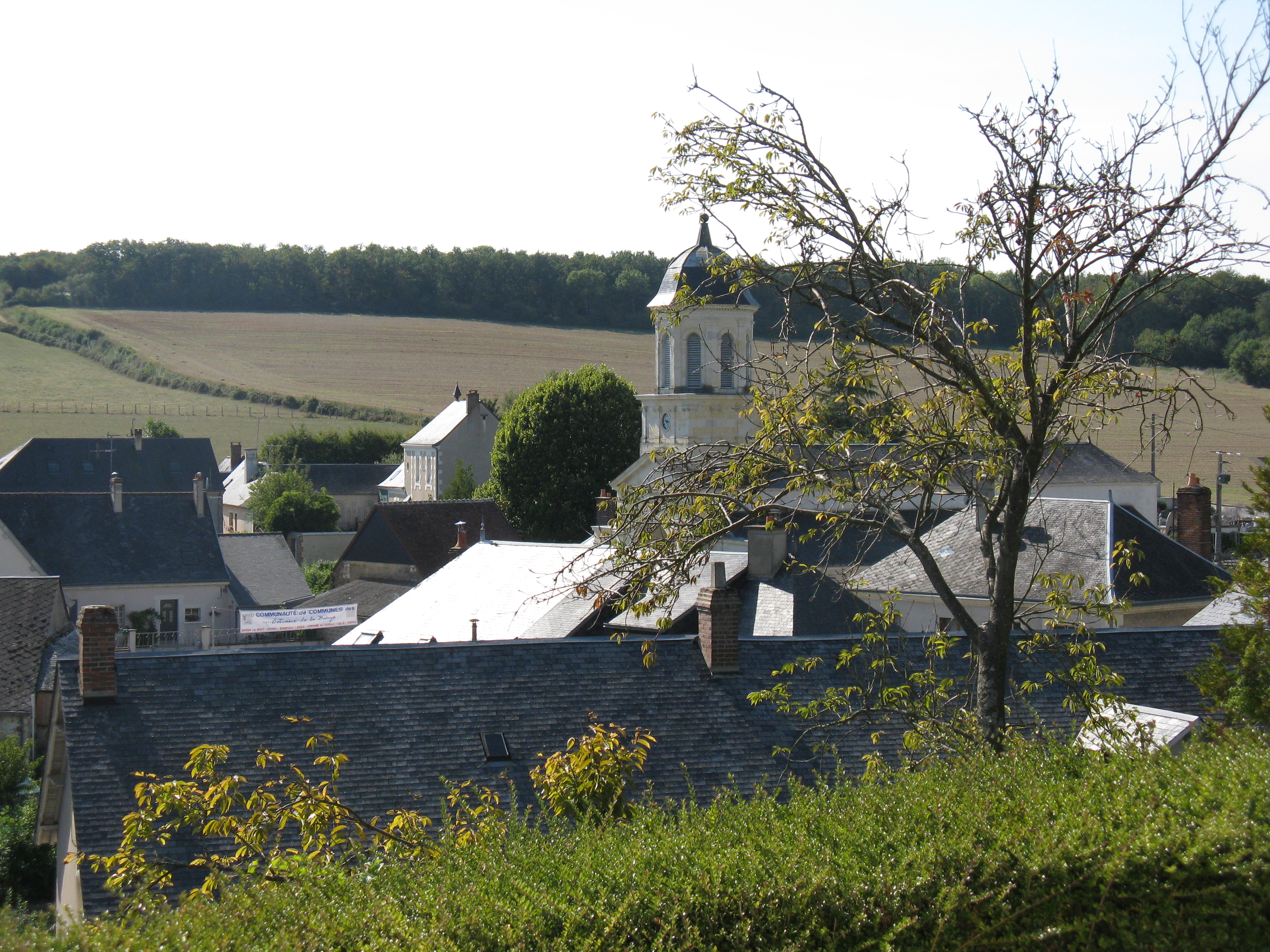

- Coat of arms
- Location of Cellé
- Location within France Location within Centre-Val de Loire
- Coordinates: 47°50′04″N 0°47′01″E
- Country: France
- Region: Centre-Val de Loire
- Department: Loir-et-Cher
- Arrondissement: Vendôme
- Canton: Le Perche
- Intercommunality: CA Territoires Vendômois

Government
  - Mayor (2020–2026): Jean-Claude Gerbaud
- Area^{1}: 12.67 km^{2} (4.89 sq mi)
- Elevation: 100 m (330 ft)
- Highest elevation: 155 m (509 ft)
- Lowest elevation: 73 m (240 ft)
- Population (2023): 225
  - Density: 17.8/km^{2} (46.0/sq mi)
- Time zone: UTC+01:00 (CET)
  - Summer (DST): UTC+02:00 (CEST)
- INSEE/Postal code: 41030 /41360
- ^{1} French Land Register data, which excludes lakes, ponds, glaciers > 1 km^{2} (0.386 sq mi or 247 acres) and river estuaries.

Cellé (French pronunciation: [sɛle]) is a commune in the Loir-et-Cher department in central France.

== Population ==
Historical population
Year	Pop.	±% p.a.
1968	301	—
1975	244	−2.95%
1982	250	+0.35%
1990	261	+0.54%
1999	270	+0.38%
2007	256	−0.66%
2012	244	−0.96%
2017	225	−1.61%
2023	225	+0.00%
Source: INSEE

== See also ==
- Communes of the Loir-et-Cher department
