= Le Gault-du-Perche =

- Commune
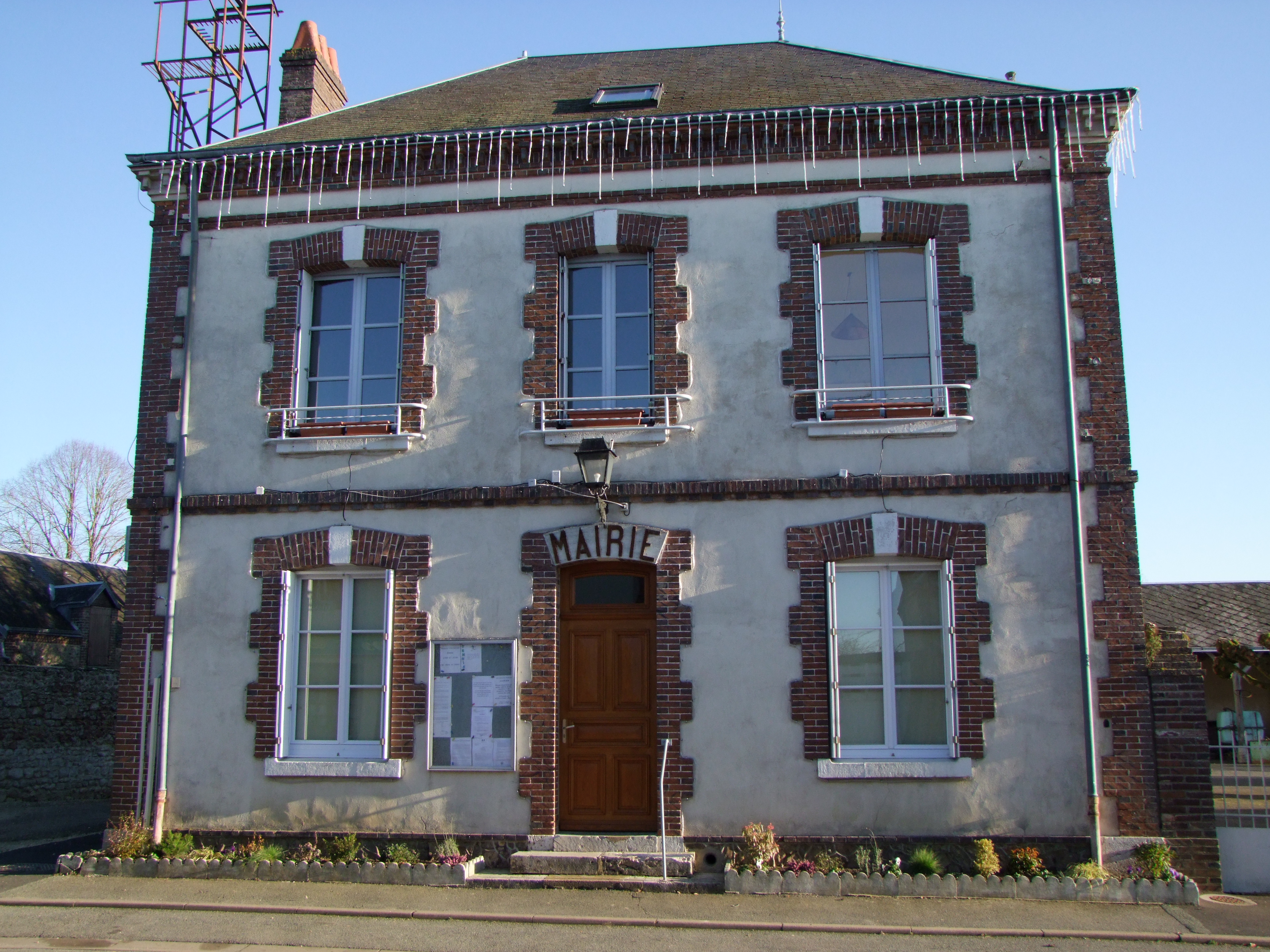
- Town hall

- Coat of arms
- Location of Le Gault-du-Perche
- Location within France Location within Centre-Val de Loire
- Coordinates: 48°05′45″N 0°58′49″E
- Country: France
- Region: Centre-Val de Loire
- Department: Loir-et-Cher
- Arrondissement: Vendôme
- Canton: Le Perche
- Intercommunality: Collines du Perche

Government
  - Mayor (2020–2026): Christelle Richette
- Area^{1}: 28.2 km^{2} (10.9 sq mi)
- Elevation: 228 m (748 ft)
- Highest elevation: 228 m (748 ft)
- Lowest elevation: 165 m (541 ft)
- Population (2023): 320
  - Density: 11/km^{2} (29/sq mi)
- Time zone: UTC+01:00 (CET)
  - Summer (DST): UTC+02:00 (CEST)
- INSEE/Postal code: 41096 /41270
- ^{1} French Land Register data, which excludes lakes, ponds, glaciers > 1 km^{2} (0.386 sq mi or 247 acres) and river estuaries.

Le Gault-du-Perche (French pronunciation: [lə ɡo dy pɛʁʃ], literally Le Gault of the Perche; before 2017: Le Gault-Perche) is a commune in the Loir-et-Cher department of central France, close to the border with Eure-et-Loir.

== Population ==
Historical population
Year	Pop.	±% p.a.
1968	636	—
1975	575	−1.43%
1982	490	−2.26%
1990	360	−3.78%
1999	301	−1.97%
2007	266	−1.53%
2012	308	+2.98%
2017	341	+2.06%
2023	320	−1.05%
Source: INSEE

== See also ==
- Communes of the Loir-et-Cher department
