= Moisy =

- Commune
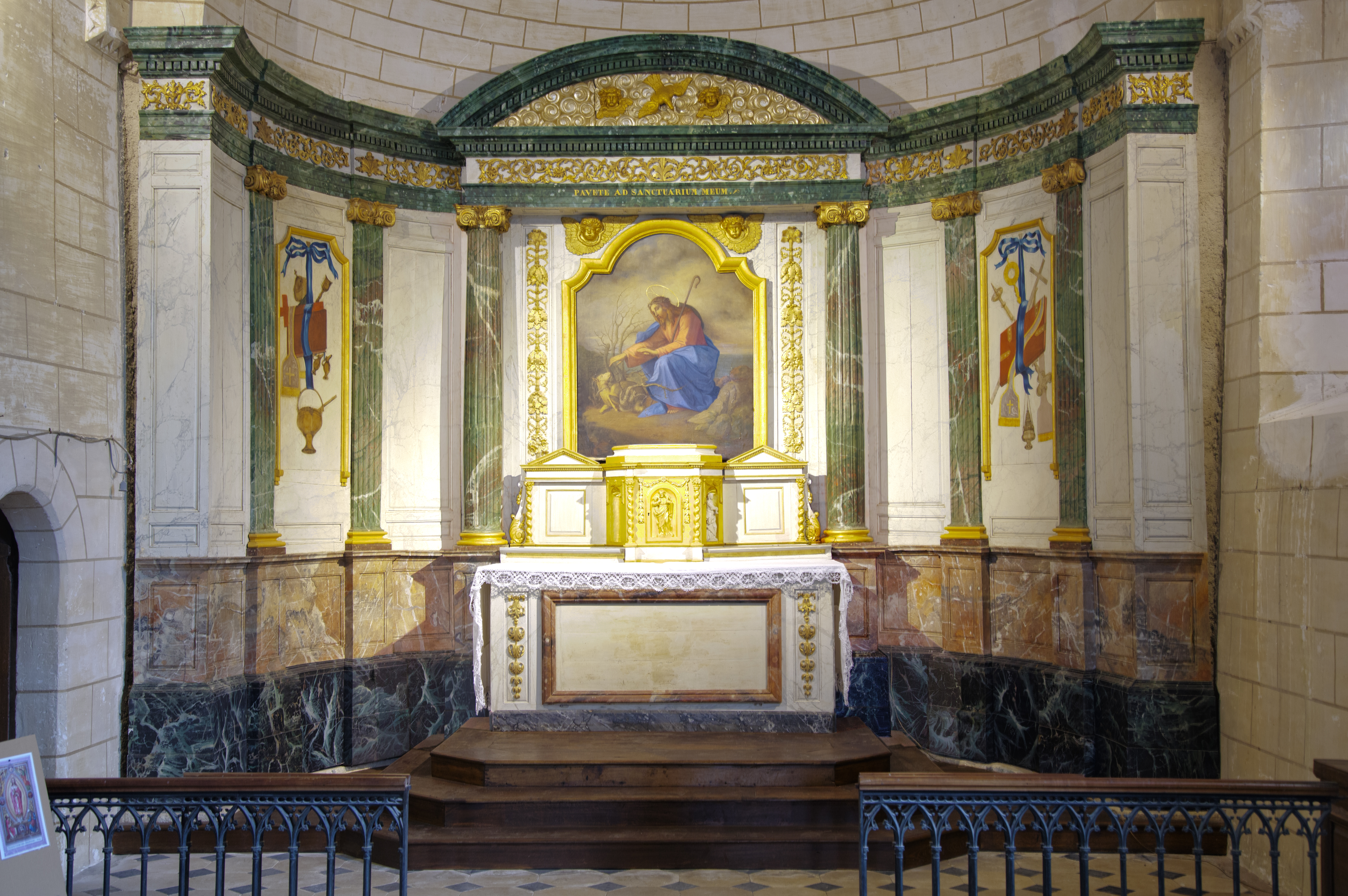
- Altar in the church of the Madeleine

- Coat of arms
- Location of Moisy
- Location within France Location within Centre-Val de Loire
- Coordinates: 47°54′56″N 1°18′59″E
- Country: France
- Region: Centre-Val de Loire
- Department: Loir-et-Cher
- Arrondissement: Vendôme
- Canton: Le Perche

Government
  - Mayor (2020–2026): Sixtine Lamé
- Area^{1}: 17.33 km^{2} (6.69 sq mi)
- Elevation: 129 m (423 ft)
- Highest elevation: 137 m (449 ft)
- Lowest elevation: 117 m (384 ft)
- Population (2023): 337
  - Density: 19.4/km^{2} (50.4/sq mi)
- Time zone: UTC+01:00 (CET)
  - Summer (DST): UTC+02:00 (CEST)
- INSEE/Postal code: 41141 /41160
- ^{1} French Land Register data, which excludes lakes, ponds, glaciers > 1 km^{2} (0.386 sq mi or 247 acres) and river estuaries.

Moisy (French pronunciation: [mwazi]) is a commune in the Loir-et-Cher department of central France.

== Population ==
Historical population
Year	Pop.	±% p.a.
1968	411	—
1975	356	−2.03%
1982	312	−1.87%
1990	267	−1.93%
1999	270	+0.12%
2007	302	+1.41%
2012	331	+1.85%
2017	365	+1.97%
2023	337	−1.32%
Source: INSEE

== See also ==
- Communes of the Loir-et-Cher department
