= Villebout =

- Commune
- Coat of arms
- Location of Villebout
- Location within France Location within Centre-Val de Loire
- Coordinates: 47°59′25″N 1°10′44″E
- Country: France
- Region: Centre-Val de Loire
- Department: Loir-et-Cher
- Arrondissement: Vendôme
- Canton: Le Perche
- Intercommunality: Perche et Haut Vendômois

Government
  - Mayor (2020–2026): Daniel Alazard
- Area^{1}: 11.21 km^{2} (4.33 sq mi)
- Elevation: 260 m (850 ft)
- Highest elevation: 225 m (738 ft)
- Lowest elevation: 107 m (351 ft)
- Population (2023): 118
  - Density: 10.5/km^{2} (27.3/sq mi)
- Time zone: UTC+01:00 (CET)
  - Summer (DST): UTC+02:00 (CEST)
- INSEE/Postal code: 41277 /41270
- ^{1} French Land Register data, which excludes lakes, ponds, glaciers > 1 km^{2} (0.386 sq mi or 247 acres) and river estuaries.

Villebout (French pronunciation: [vilbu]) is a commune in the Loir-et-Cher department in central France.

== Population ==
Historical population
Year	Pop.	±% p.a.
1968	167	—
1975	150	−1.52%
1982	136	−1.39%
1990	148	+1.06%
1999	106	−3.64%
2007	140	+3.54%
2012	127	−1.93%
2017	140	+1.97%
2023	118	−2.81%
Source: INSEE

== See also ==
- Communes of the Loir-et-Cher department
