= Saint-Firmin-des-Prés =

- Commune
- Coat of arms
- Location of Saint-Firmin-des-Prés
- Location within France Location within Centre-Val de Loire
- Coordinates: 47°50′35″N 1°06′52″E
- Country: France
- Region: Centre-Val de Loire
- Department: Loir-et-Cher
- Arrondissement: Vendôme
- Canton: Le Perche
- Intercommunality: CA Territoires Vendômois

Government
  - Mayor (2020–2026): Benoit Rousselet
- Area^{1}: 13.89 km^{2} (5.36 sq mi)
- Elevation: 90 m (300 ft)
- Highest elevation: 140 m (460 ft)
- Lowest elevation: 79 m (259 ft)
- Population (2023): 744
  - Density: 53.6/km^{2} (139/sq mi)
- Time zone: UTC+01:00 (CET)
  - Summer (DST): UTC+02:00 (CEST)
- INSEE/Postal code: 41209 /41100
- ^{1} French Land Register data, which excludes lakes, ponds, glaciers > 1 km^{2} (0.386 sq mi or 247 acres) and river estuaries.

Saint-Firmin-des-Prés is a commune in the Loir-et-Cher department of central France.

== Population ==
Historical population
Year	Pop.	±% p.a.
1968	403	—
1975	425	+0.76%
1982	649	+6.23%
1990	689	+0.75%
1999	777	+1.34%
2007	788	+0.18%
2012	869	+1.98%
2017	824	−1.06%
2023	744	−1.69%
Source: INSEE

== See also ==
- Communes of the Loir-et-Cher department
