= Canton of Le Perche =

Administrative division of Loir-et-Cher, France

Coordinates: 47.88°N 0.81°E

A map of the canton of Le Perche in the Loir-et-Cher department

The canton of Le Perche (French: Canton du Perche) is a canton (an administrative division) of the Loir-et-Cher department, central France. Its seat is Savigny-sur-Braye. It was created at the canton reorganisation that came into effect in March 2015. Since then it elects two members of the Departmental Council of Loir-et-Cher.

== Composition ==
The canton of Le Perche consists of the following communes:

1. Baillou
2. Beauchêne
3. Bonneveau
4. Bouffry
5. Boursay
6. Brévainville
7. Busloup
8. Cellé
9. La Chapelle-Enchérie
10. La Chapelle-Vicomtesse
11. Chauvigny-du-Perche
12. Choue
13. Cormenon
14. Couëtron-au-Perche
15. Danzé
16. Droué
17. Épuisay
18. Fontaine-les-Coteaux
19. Fontaine-Raoul
20. La Fontenelle
21. Fortan
22. Fréteval
23. Le Gault-du-Perche
24. Lignières
25. Lisle
26. Moisy
27. Mondoubleau
28. Morée
29. Ouzouer-le-Doyen
30. Pezou
31. Le Plessis-Dorin
32. Le Poislay
33. Rahart
34. Renay
35. Romilly
36. Ruan-sur-Egvonne
37. Saint-Firmin-des-Prés
38. Saint-Hilaire-la-Gravelle
39. Saint-Jean-Froidmentel
40. Saint-Marc-du-Cor
41. Sargé-sur-Braye
42. Savigny-sur-Braye
43. Sougé
44. Le Temple
45. La Ville-aux-Clercs
46. Villebout

== See also ==
- Perche
