= Danzé =

- Commune
- Coat of arms
- Location of Danzé
- Location within France Location within Centre-Val de Loire
- Coordinates: 47°53′38″N 1°01′44″E
- Country: France
- Region: Centre-Val de Loire
- Department: Loir-et-Cher
- Arrondissement: Vendôme
- Canton: Le Perche
- Intercommunality: CA Territoires Vendômois

Government
  - Mayor (2020–2026): Thierry Sifantus
- Area^{1}: 42.26 km^{2} (16.32 sq mi)
- Elevation: 140 m (460 ft)
- Highest elevation: 183 m (600 ft)
- Lowest elevation: 107 m (351 ft)
- Population (2023): 671
  - Density: 15.9/km^{2} (41.1/sq mi)
- Time zone: UTC+01:00 (CET)
  - Summer (DST): UTC+02:00 (CEST)
- INSEE/Postal code: 41073 /41160
- ^{1} French Land Register data, which excludes lakes, ponds, glaciers > 1 km^{2} (0.386 sq mi or 247 acres) and river estuaries.

Danzé (French pronunciation: [dɑ̃ze]) is a commune in the Loir-et-Cher department of central France.

== Population ==
Historical population
Year	Pop.	±% p.a.
1968	674	—
1975	515	−3.77%
1982	556	+1.10%
1990	578	+0.49%
1999	605	+0.51%
2007	725	+2.29%
2012	715	−0.28%
2017	694	−0.59%
2023	671	−0.56%
Source: INSEE

== See also ==
- Communes of the Loir-et-Cher department
