= Chauvigny-du-Perche =

- Commune
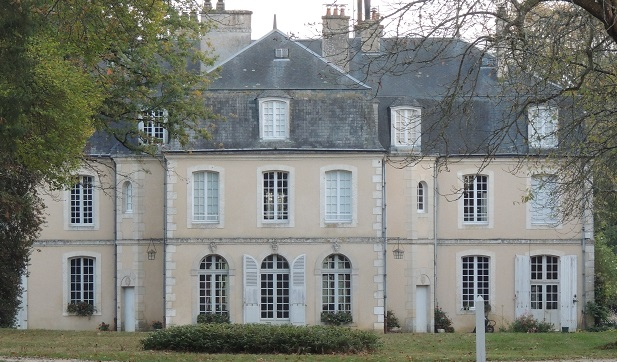
- Chauvigny du Perche, Chateau des Diorieres

- Coat of arms
- Location of Chauvigny-du-Perche
- Location within France Location within Centre-Val de Loire
- Coordinates: 47°57′32″N 1°04′50″E
- Country: France
- Region: Centre-Val de Loire
- Department: Loir-et-Cher
- Arrondissement: Vendôme
- Canton: Le Perche

Government
  - Mayor (2020–2026): Danielle Périn
- Area^{1}: 23.43 km^{2} (9.05 sq mi)
- Elevation: 182 m (597 ft)
- Highest elevation: 226 m (741 ft)
- Lowest elevation: 132 m (433 ft)
- Population (2023): 230
  - Density: 9.8/km^{2} (25/sq mi)
- Time zone: UTC+01:00 (CET)
  - Summer (DST): UTC+02:00 (CEST)
- INSEE/Postal code: 41048 /41270
- ^{1} French Land Register data, which excludes lakes, ponds, glaciers > 1 km^{2} (0.386 sq mi or 247 acres) and river estuaries.

Chauvigny-du-Perche (French pronunciation: [ʃoviɲi dy pɛʁʃ], literally Chauvigny of the Perche) is a commune in the Loir-et-Cher department in central France.

== Population ==
Historical population
Year	Pop.	±% p.a.
1968	418	—
1975	349	−2.54%
1982	287	−2.76%
1990	257	−1.37%
1999	244	−0.58%
2007	227	−0.90%
2012	231	+0.35%
2017	220	−0.97%
2023	230	+0.74%
Source: INSEE

== See also ==
- Communes of the Loir-et-Cher department
