= Fontaine-Raoul =

- Commune
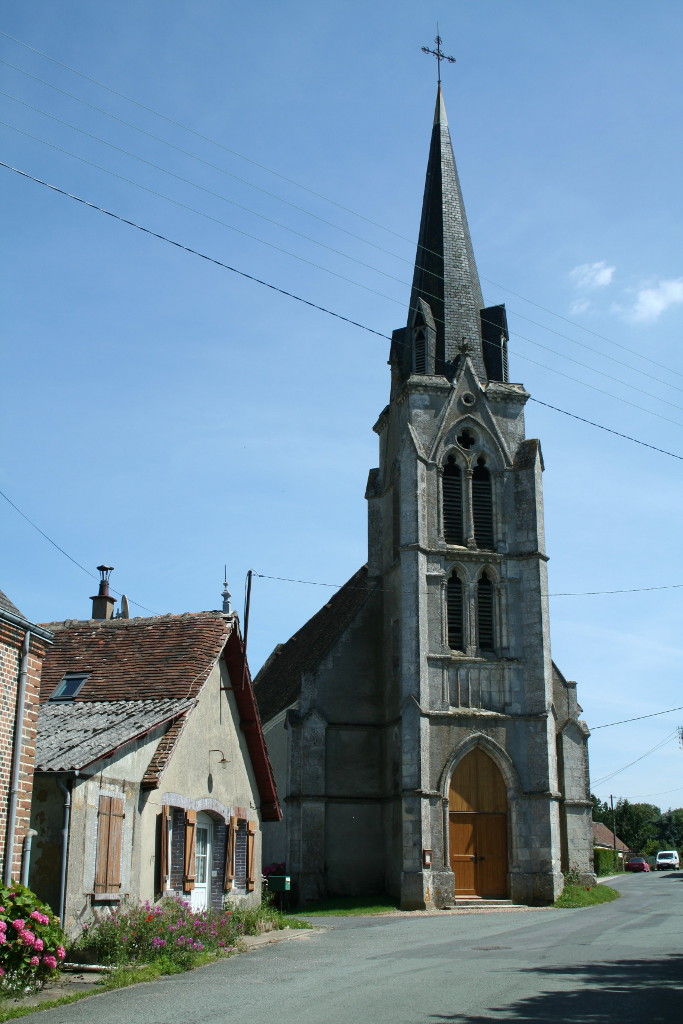

- Coat of arms
- Location of Fontaine-Raoul
- Location within France Location within Centre-Val de Loire
- Coordinates: 47°59′29″N 1°08′23″E
- Country: France
- Region: Centre-Val de Loire
- Department: Loir-et-Cher
- Arrondissement: Vendôme
- Canton: Le Perche
- Intercommunality: Perche et Haut Vendômois

Government
  - Mayor (2020–2026): Sibylle de Beaudignies
- Area^{1}: 21.9 km^{2} (8.5 sq mi)
- Elevation: 240 m (790 ft)
- Highest elevation: 256 m (840 ft)
- Lowest elevation: 124 m (407 ft)
- Population (2023): 231
  - Density: 10.5/km^{2} (27.3/sq mi)
- Time zone: UTC+01:00 (CET)
  - Summer (DST): UTC+02:00 (CEST)
- INSEE/Postal code: 41088 /41270
- ^{1} French Land Register data, which excludes lakes, ponds, glaciers > 1 km^{2} (0.386 sq mi or 247 acres) and river estuaries.

Fontaine-Raoul (French pronunciation: [fɔ̃tɛn ʁaul]) is a commune in the Loir-et-Cher department of central France.

== Population ==
Historical population
Year	Pop.	±% p.a.
1968	281	—
1975	208	−4.21%
1982	209	+0.07%
1990	178	−1.99%
1999	197	+1.13%
2007	223	+1.56%
2012	223	+0.00%
2017	225	+0.18%
2023	231	+0.44%
Source: INSEE

== See also ==
- Communes of the Loir-et-Cher department
