= Saint-Hilaire-la-Gravelle =

- Commune
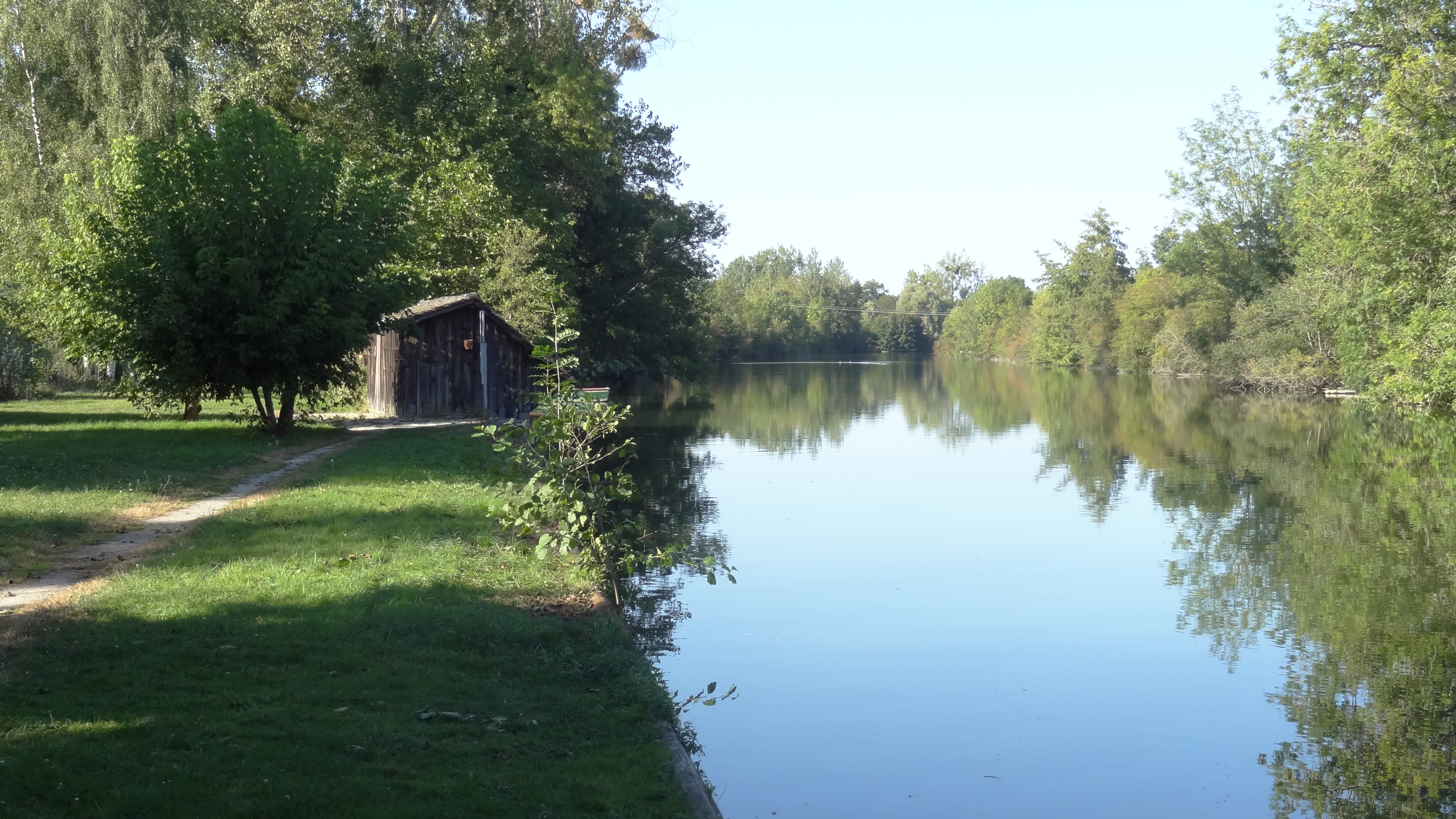
- The Loir

- Coat of arms
- Location of Saint-Hilaire-la-Gravelle
- Location within France Location within Centre-Val de Loire
- Coordinates: 47°55′31″N 1°12′27″E
- Country: France
- Region: Centre-Val de Loire
- Department: Loir-et-Cher
- Arrondissement: Vendôme
- Canton: Le Perche
- Intercommunality: Perche et Haut Vendômois

Government
  - Mayor (2020–2026): Rémi Penais
- Area^{1}: 17.57 km^{2} (6.78 sq mi)
- Elevation: 92 m (302 ft)
- Highest elevation: 172 m (564 ft)
- Lowest elevation: 87 m (285 ft)
- Population (2023): 652
  - Density: 37.1/km^{2} (96.1/sq mi)
- Time zone: UTC+01:00 (CET)
  - Summer (DST): UTC+02:00 (CEST)
- INSEE/Postal code: 41214 /41160
- ^{1} French Land Register data, which excludes lakes, ponds, glaciers > 1 km^{2} (0.386 sq mi or 247 acres) and river estuaries.

Saint-Hilaire-la-Gravelle (French pronunciation: [sɛ̃.t‿ilɛʁ la ɡʁavɛl]) is a commune in the Loir-et-Cher department of central France.

== Population ==
Historical population
Year	Pop.	±% p.a.
1968	558	—
1975	556	−0.05%
1982	663	+2.55%
1990	648	−0.29%
1999	687	+0.65%
2007	690	+0.05%
2012	674	−0.47%
2017	717	+1.24%
2023	652	−1.57%
Source: INSEE

== See also ==
- Communes of the Loir-et-Cher department
