= La Fontenelle, Loir-et-Cher =

La Fontenelle
- Commune
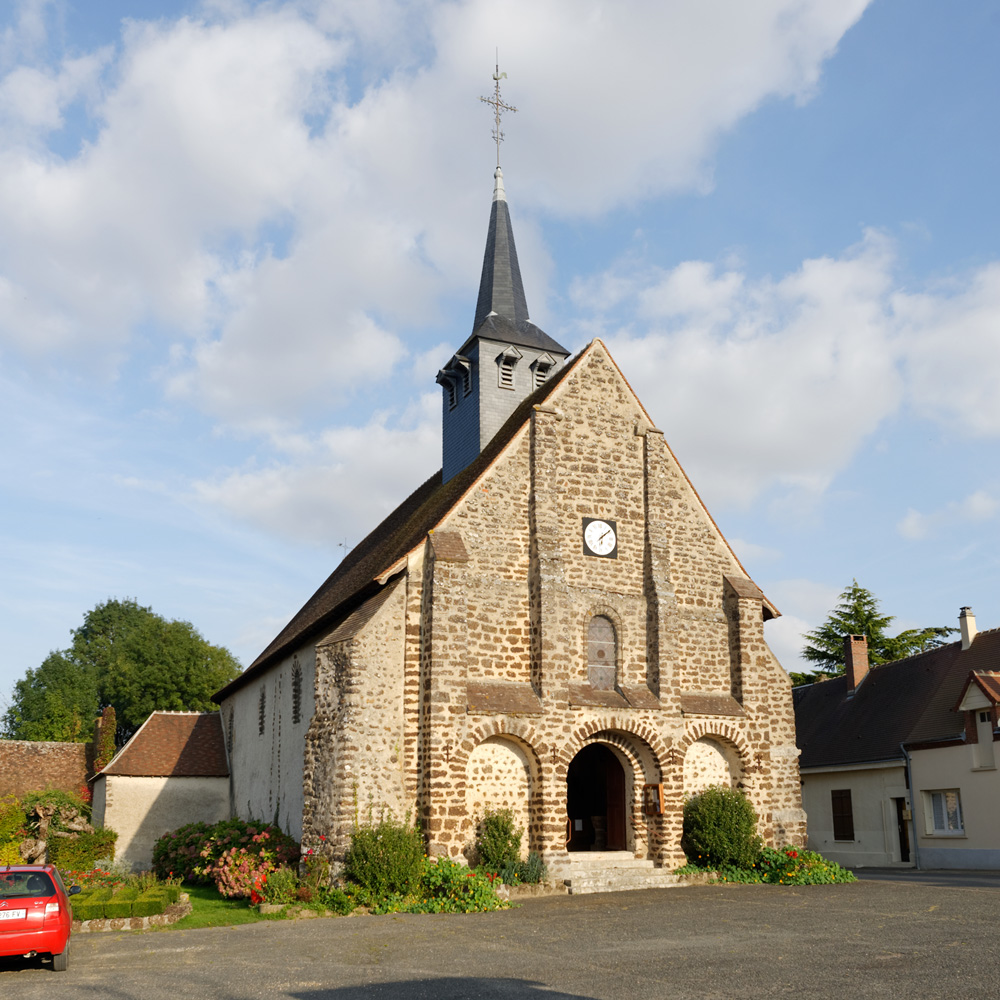
- Church of Saint-Loup-Saint-Gilles

- Coat of arms
- Location of La Fontenelle
- Location within France Location within Centre-Val de Loire
- Coordinates: 48°03′39″N 1°01′30″E
- Country: France
- Region: Centre-Val de Loire
- Department: Loir-et-Cher
- Arrondissement: Vendôme
- Canton: Le Perche

Government
  - Mayor (2020–2026): Joël Verdier
- Area^{1}: 20.1 km^{2} (7.8 sq mi)
- Elevation: 185 m (607 ft)
- Highest elevation: 202 m (663 ft)
- Lowest elevation: 156 m (512 ft)
- Population (2023): 204
  - Density: 10.1/km^{2} (26.3/sq mi)
- Time zone: UTC+01:00 (CET)
  - Summer (DST): UTC+02:00 (CEST)
- INSEE/Postal code: 41089 /41270
- ^{1} French Land Register data, which excludes lakes, ponds, glaciers > 1 km^{2} (0.386 sq mi or 247 acres) and river estuaries.

La Fontenelle (French pronunciation: [la fɔ̃tnɛl]) is a commune in the Loir-et-Cher department of central France.

== Population ==
Historical population
Year	Pop.	±% p.a.
1968	364	—
1975	297	−2.86%
1982	218	−4.32%
1990	208	−0.59%
1999	185	−1.29%
2007	182	−0.20%
2012	197	+1.60%
2017	195	−0.20%
2023	204	+0.75%
Source: INSEE

== See also ==
- Communes of the Loir-et-Cher department
