= La Chapelle-Enchérie =

- Commune
- Coat of arms
- Location of La Chapelle-Enchérie
- Location within France Location within Centre-Val de Loire
- Coordinates: 47°49′31″N 1°12′18″E
- Country: France
- Region: Centre-Val de Loire
- Department: Loir-et-Cher
- Arrondissement: Vendôme
- Canton: Le Perche
- Intercommunality: Perche et Haut Vendômois

Government
  - Mayor (2020–2026): Alexandra Cassant
- Area^{1}: 10.76 km^{2} (4.15 sq mi)
- Elevation: 120 m (390 ft)
- Highest elevation: 144 m (472 ft)
- Lowest elevation: 98 m (322 ft)
- Population (2023): 212
  - Density: 19.7/km^{2} (51.0/sq mi)
- Time zone: UTC+01:00 (CET)
  - Summer (DST): UTC+02:00 (CEST)
- INSEE/Postal code: 41037 /41290
- ^{1} French Land Register data, which excludes lakes, ponds, glaciers > 1 km^{2} (0.386 sq mi or 247 acres) and river estuaries.

La Chapelle-Enchérie (French pronunciation: [la ʃapɛl ɑ̃ʃeʁi]) is a commune in the Loir-et-Cher department, Centre-Val de Loire, France.

== Population ==
Historical population
Year	Pop.	±% p.a.
1968	167	—
1975	139	−2.59%
1982	129	−1.06%
1990	134	+0.48%
1999	146	+0.96%
2007	154	+0.67%
2012	189	+4.18%
2017	211	+2.23%
2023	212	+0.08%
Source: INSEE

== See also ==
- Communes of the Loir-et-Cher department
