= Bouffry =

- Commune
- Coat of arms
- Location of Bouffry
- Location within France Location within Centre-Val de Loire
- Coordinates: 48°00′32″N 1°05′53″E
- Country: France
- Region: Centre-Val de Loire
- Department: Loir-et-Cher
- Arrondissement: Vendôme
- Canton: Le Perche

Government
  - Mayor (2020–2026): Monique Soria
- Area^{1}: 17.73 km^{2} (6.85 sq mi)
- Elevation: 236 m (774 ft)
- Highest elevation: 256 m (840 ft)
- Lowest elevation: 139 m (456 ft)
- Population (2023): 137
  - Density: 7.73/km^{2} (20.0/sq mi)
- Time zone: UTC+01:00 (CET)
  - Summer (DST): UTC+02:00 (CEST)
- INSEE/Postal code: 41022 /41270
- ^{1} French Land Register data, which excludes lakes, ponds, glaciers > 1 km^{2} (0.386 sq mi or 247 acres) and river estuaries.

Bouffry (French pronunciation: [bufʁi]) is a commune in the Loir-et-Cher department in central France.

== Population ==
Historical population
Year	Pop.	±% p.a.
1968	244	—
1975	182	−4.10%
1982	147	−3.00%
1990	137	−0.88%
1999	158	+1.60%
2007	149	−0.73%
2012	148	−0.13%
2017	134	−1.97%
2023	137	+0.37%
Source: INSEE

== See also ==
- Communes of the Loir-et-Cher department
