= Beauchêne, Loir-et-Cher =

Beauchêne
- Commune
- Coat of arms
- Location of Beauchêne
- Location within France Location within Centre-Val de Loire
- Coordinates: 47°56′28″N 0°58′12″E
- Country: France
- Region: Centre-Val de Loire
- Department: Loir-et-Cher
- Arrondissement: Vendôme
- Canton: Le Perche
- Intercommunality: Collines du Perche

Government
  - Mayor (2020–2026): Vincent Tompa
- Area^{1}: 10.08 km^{2} (3.89 sq mi)
- Elevation: 176 m (577 ft)
- Highest elevation: 205 m (673 ft)
- Lowest elevation: 164 m (538 ft)
- Population (2023): 172
  - Density: 17.1/km^{2} (44.2/sq mi)
- Time zone: UTC+01:00 (CET)
  - Summer (DST): UTC+02:00 (CEST)
- INSEE/Postal code: 41014 /41170
- ^{1} French Land Register data, which excludes lakes, ponds, glaciers > 1 km^{2} (0.386 sq mi or 247 acres) and river estuaries.

Beauchêne (French pronunciation: [boʃɛn]) is a commune in the Loir-et-Cher department in central France.

== Population ==
Historical population

Year	Pop.	±% p.a.
1793	269	—
1821	424	+1.64%
1846	456	+0.29%
1872	352	−0.99%
1901	388	+0.34%
1926	367	−0.22%
1946	283	−1.29%
1962	263	−0.46%
1968	234	−1.93%

Year	Pop.	±% p.a.
1975	183	−3.45%
1982	144	−3.37%
1990	117	−2.56%
1999	142	+2.18%
2007	161	+1.58%
2012	174	+1.57%
2017	173	−0.12%
2023	172	−0.10%

Source: EHESS and INSEE

== See also ==
- Communes of the Loir-et-Cher department
