= Saint-Jean-Froidmentel =

- Commune
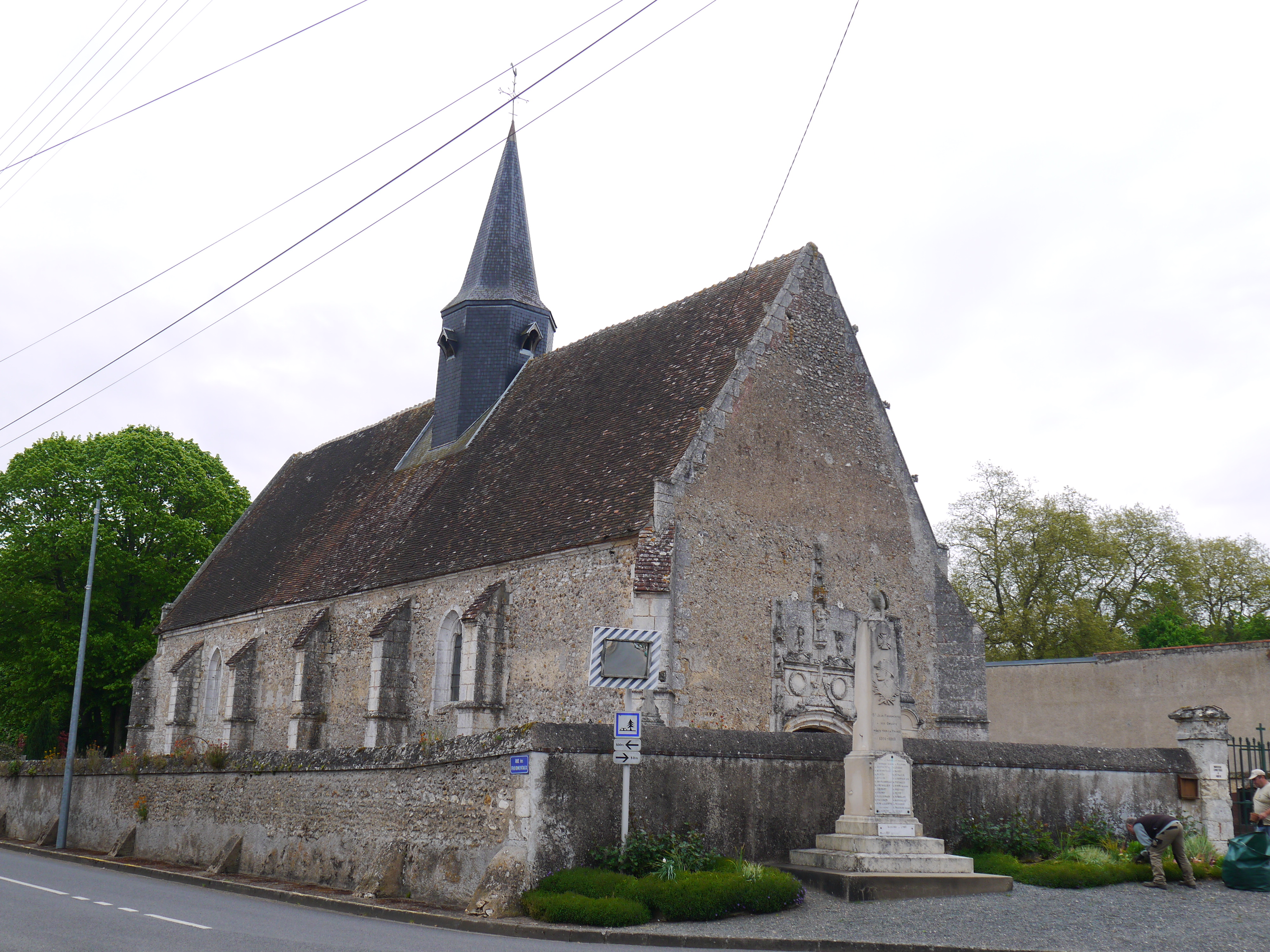

- Coat of arms
- Location of Saint-Jean-Froidmentel
- Location within France Location within Centre-Val de Loire
- Coordinates: 47°57′27″N 1°14′27″E
- Country: France
- Region: Centre-Val de Loire
- Department: Loir-et-Cher
- Arrondissement: Vendôme
- Canton: Le Perche

Government
  - Mayor (2020–2026): Laurent Borel
- Area^{1}: 17.2 km^{2} (6.6 sq mi)
- Elevation: 98 m (322 ft)
- Highest elevation: 189 m (620 ft)
- Lowest elevation: 88 m (289 ft)
- Population (2023): 505
  - Density: 29.4/km^{2} (76.0/sq mi)
- Time zone: UTC+01:00 (CET)
  - Summer (DST): UTC+02:00 (CEST)
- INSEE/Postal code: 41216 /41160
- ^{1} French Land Register data, which excludes lakes, ponds, glaciers > 1 km^{2} (0.386 sq mi or 247 acres) and river estuaries.

Saint-Jean-Froidmentel (French pronunciation: [sɛ̃ ʒɑ̃ fʁwamɑ̃tɛl]) is a commune in the Loir-et-Cher department in central France.

== Population ==
Historical population
Year	Pop.	±% p.a.
1968	462	—
1975	439	−0.73%
1982	418	−0.70%
1990	385	−1.02%
1999	437	+1.42%
2007	502	+1.75%
2012	502	+0.00%
2017	548	+1.77%
2023	505	−1.35%
Source: INSEE

== See also ==
- Communes of the Loir-et-Cher department
