= Droué =

- Commune
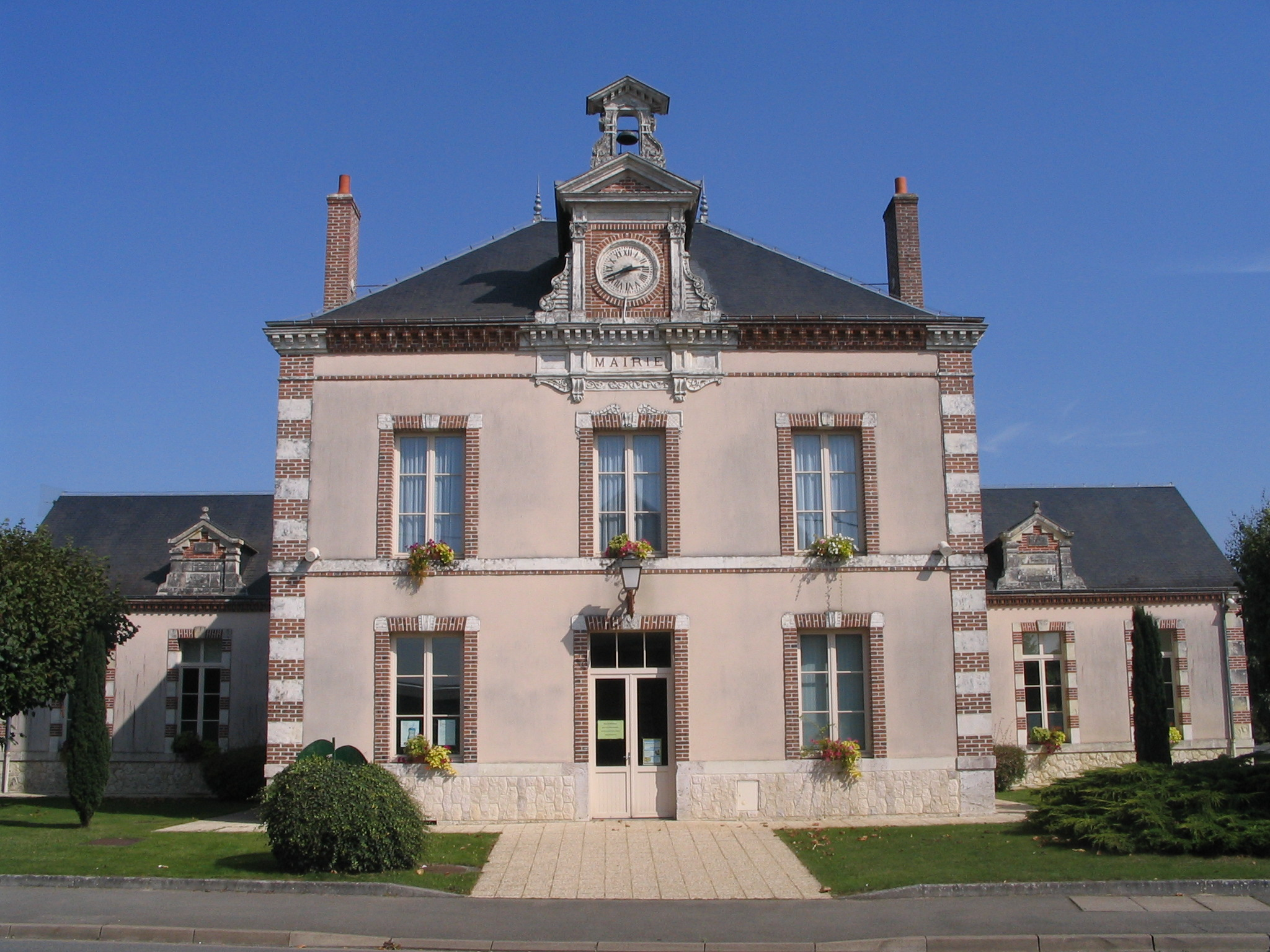
- Town hall

- Coat of arms
- Location of Droué
- Location within France Location within Centre-Val de Loire
- Coordinates: 48°02′29″N 1°04′38″E
- Country: France
- Region: Centre-Val de Loire
- Department: Loir-et-Cher
- Arrondissement: Vendôme
- Canton: Le Perche
- Intercommunality: Perche et Haut Vendômois

Government
  - Mayor (2020–2026): Catherine Monnier
- Area^{1}: 24.04 km^{2} (9.28 sq mi)
- Elevation: 158 m (518 ft)
- Highest elevation: 214 m (702 ft)
- Lowest elevation: 143 m (469 ft)
- Population (2023): 999
  - Density: 41.6/km^{2} (108/sq mi)
- Time zone: UTC+01:00 (CET)
  - Summer (DST): UTC+02:00 (CEST)
- INSEE/Postal code: 41075 /41260
- ^{1} French Land Register data, which excludes lakes, ponds, glaciers > 1 km^{2} (0.386 sq mi or 247 acres) and river estuaries.

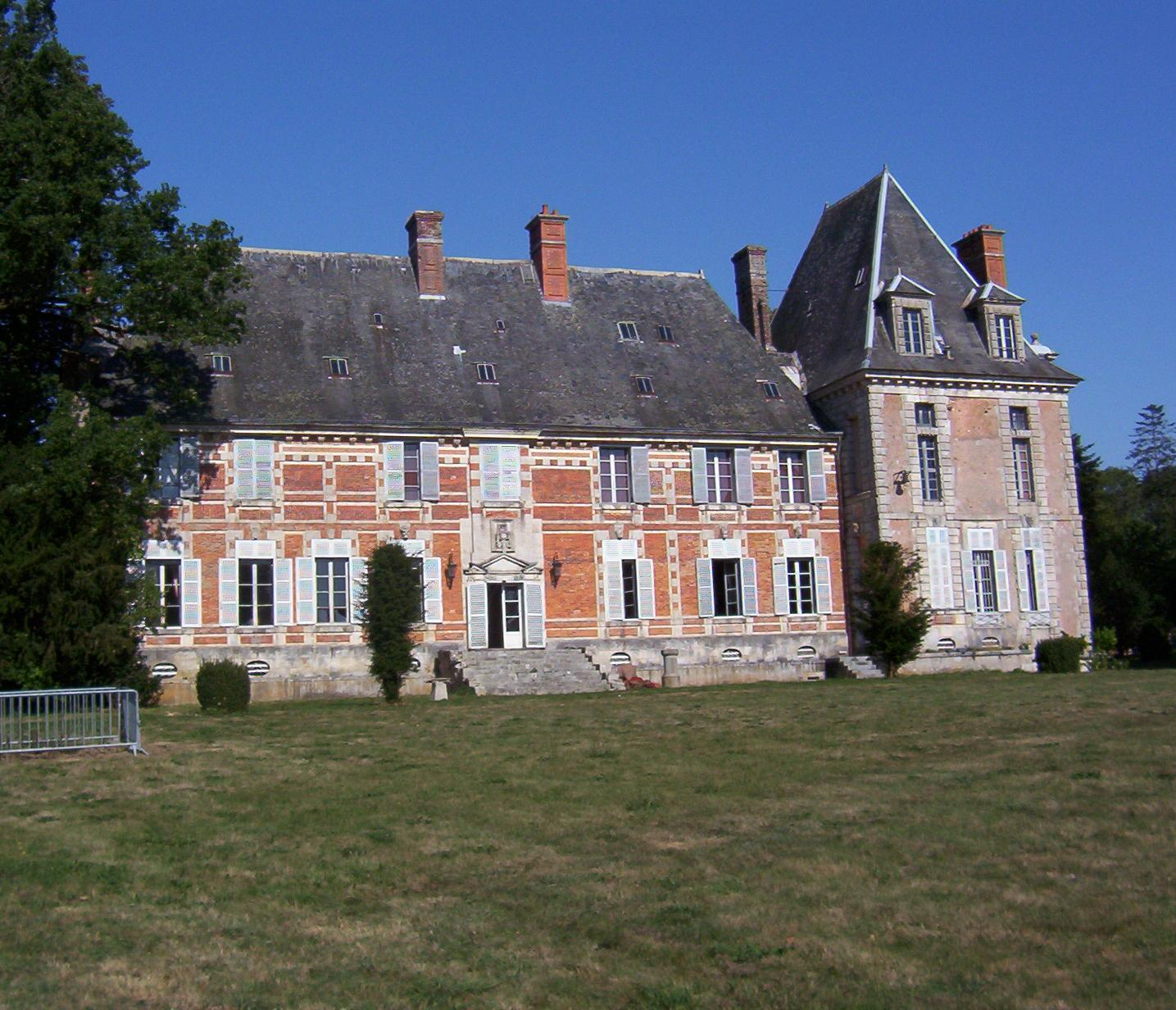
Château de Droué

Droué (French pronunciation: [dʁue]) is a commune in the Loir-et-Cher department of central France.

It is 65 km northwest of Blois and is bordered on the south by the Egvonne, a tributary of the Loir.

== Population ==
Historical population
Year	Pop.	±% p.a.
1968	1,065	—
1975	1,291	+2.79%
1982	1,322	+0.34%
1990	1,353	+0.29%
1999	1,205	−1.28%
2007	1,115	−0.97%
2012	1,036	−1.46%
2017	992	−0.86%
2023	999	+0.12%
Source: INSEE

== International relations ==
It is twinned with Rothwell in the United Kingdom and Gondelsheim in Germany.

== See also ==
- Communes of the Loir-et-Cher department
