= Boursay =

Commune in Loir-et-Cher, France

- Commune
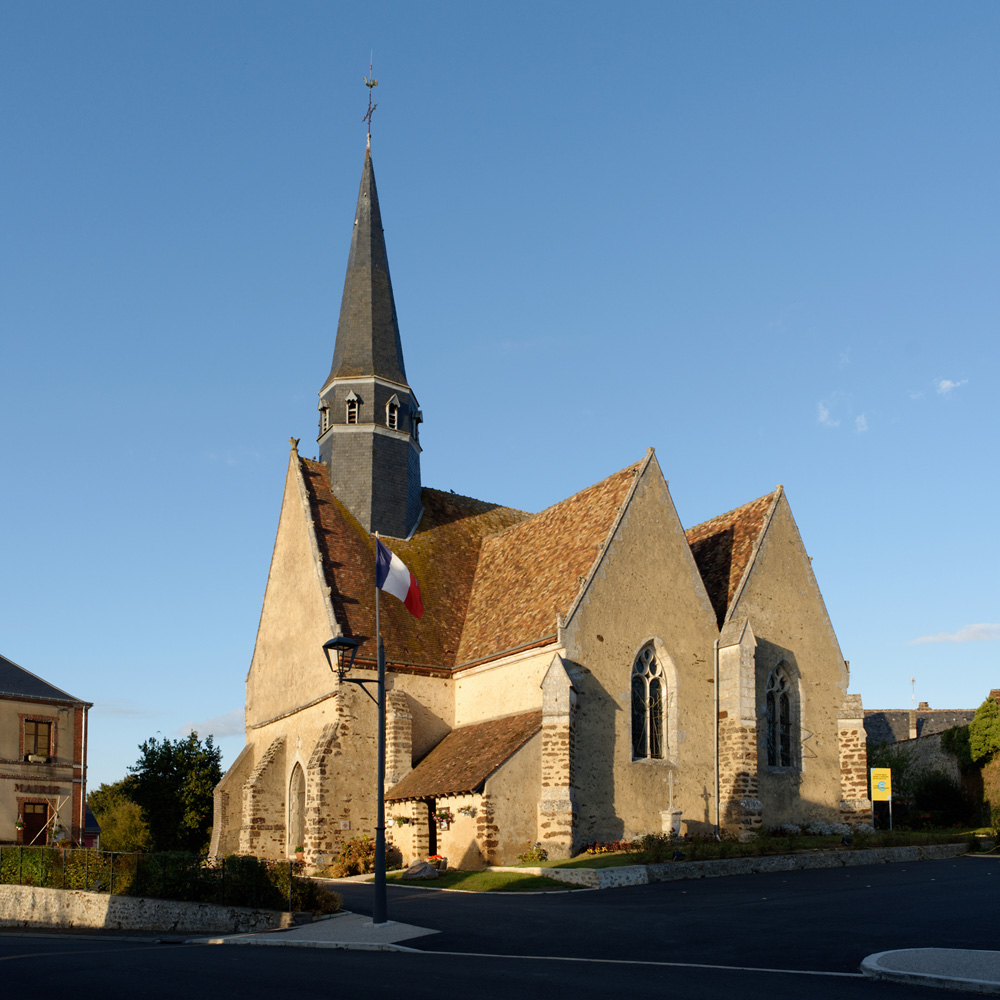
- Church of Saint-Pierre

- Coat of arms
- Location of Boursay
- Location within France Location within Centre-Val de Loire
- Coordinates: 48°01′11″N 0°58′12″E
- Country: France
- Region: Centre-Val de Loire
- Department: Loir-et-Cher
- Arrondissement: Vendôme
- Canton: Le Perche
- Intercommunality: Collines du Perche

Government
  - Mayor (2022–2026): Jean-Paul Robinet
- Area^{1}: 22.08 km^{2} (8.53 sq mi)
- Elevation: 178 m (584 ft)
- Highest elevation: 210 m (690 ft)
- Lowest elevation: 136 m (446 ft)
- Population (2023): 179
  - Density: 8.11/km^{2} (21.0/sq mi)
- Time zone: UTC+01:00 (CET)
  - Summer (DST): UTC+02:00 (CEST)
- INSEE/Postal code: 41024 /41270
- ^{1} French Land Register data, which excludes lakes, ponds, glaciers > 1 km^{2} (0.386 sq mi or 247 acres) and river estuaries.

Boursay (French pronunciation: [buʁsɛ]) is a commune in the Loir-et-Cher department in central France.

== Population ==
Historical population
Year	Pop.	±% p.a.
1968	378	—
1975	284	−4.00%
1982	229	−3.03%
1990	190	−2.31%
1999	203	+0.74%
2007	223	+1.18%
2012	197	−2.45%
2017	166	−3.37%
2023	179	+1.26%
Source: INSEE

== See also ==
- Communes of the Loir-et-Cher department
