= Fortan =

- Commune
- Coat of arms
- Location of Fortan
- Location within France Location within Centre-Val de Loire
- Coordinates: 47°50′46″N 0°55′01″E
- Country: France
- Region: Centre-Val de Loire
- Department: Loir-et-Cher
- Arrondissement: Vendôme
- Canton: Le Perche
- Intercommunality: CA Territoires Vendômois

Government
  - Mayor (2020–2026): Mickaël Casrouge
- Area^{1}: 5.98 km^{2} (2.31 sq mi)
- Elevation: 116 m (381 ft)
- Highest elevation: 147 m (482 ft)
- Lowest elevation: 95 m (312 ft)
- Population (2023): 255
  - Density: 42.6/km^{2} (110/sq mi)
- Time zone: UTC+01:00 (CET)
  - Summer (DST): UTC+02:00 (CEST)
- INSEE/Postal code: 41090 /41360
- ^{1} French Land Register data, which excludes lakes, ponds, glaciers > 1 km^{2} (0.386 sq mi or 247 acres) and river estuaries.

Fortan (French pronunciation: [fɔʁtɑ̃]) is a commune in the Loir-et-Cher department of central France.

== Population ==
Historical population
Year	Pop.	±% p.a.
1968	241	—
1975	163	−5.43%
1982	174	+0.94%
1990	155	−1.43%
1999	183	+1.86%
2007	252	+4.08%
2012	278	+1.98%
2017	269	−0.66%
2023	255	−0.89%
Source: INSEE

== See also ==
- Communes of the Loir-et-Cher department
