= La Ville-aux-Clercs =

- Commune
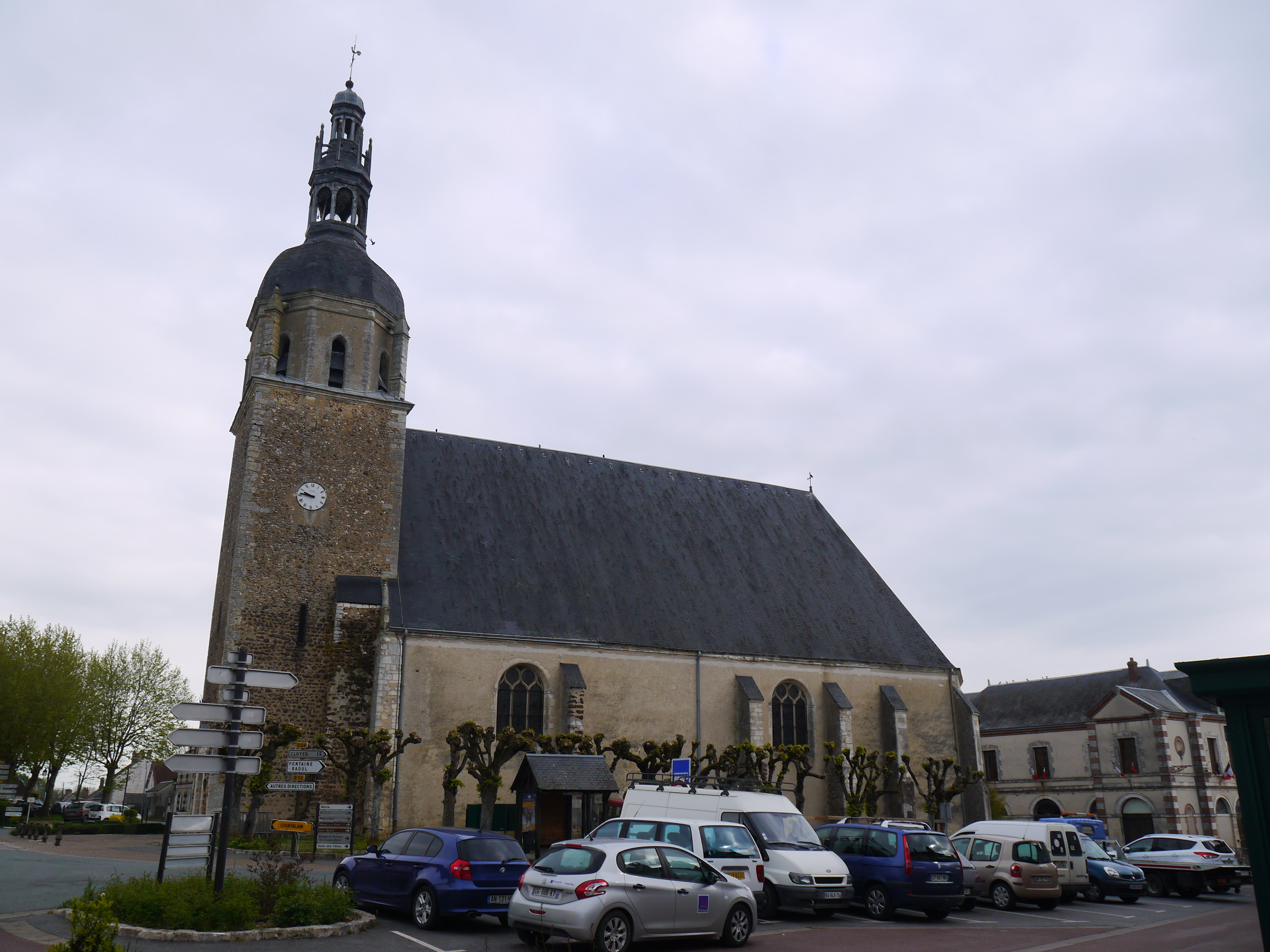
- Church of Saint Bartholomew

- Coat of arms
- Location of La Ville-aux-Clercs
- Location within France Location within Centre-Val de Loire
- Coordinates: 47°55′09″N 1°05′09″E
- Country: France
- Region: Centre-Val de Loire
- Department: Loir-et-Cher
- Arrondissement: Vendôme
- Canton: Le Perche
- Intercommunality: CA Territoires Vendômois

Government
  - Mayor (2020–2026): Bruno Dupré
- Area^{1}: 26.61 km^{2} (10.27 sq mi)
- Elevation: 142 m (466 ft)
- Highest elevation: 195 m (640 ft)
- Lowest elevation: 115 m (377 ft)
- Population (2023): 1,200
  - Density: 45/km^{2} (120/sq mi)
- Time zone: UTC+01:00 (CET)
  - Summer (DST): UTC+02:00 (CEST)
- INSEE/Postal code: 41275 /41160
- ^{1} French Land Register data, which excludes lakes, ponds, glaciers > 1 km^{2} (0.386 sq mi or 247 acres) and river estuaries.

La Ville-aux-Clercs (French pronunciation: [la vil o klɛʁ]) is a commune in the Loir-et-Cher department in central France.

== Population ==
Historical population
Year	Pop.	±% p.a.
1968	846	—
1975	870	+0.40%
1982	967	+1.52%
1990	1,114	+1.78%
1999	1,197	+0.80%
2007	1,300	+1.04%
2012	1,316	+0.24%
2017	1,273	−0.66%
2023	1,200	−0.98%
Source: INSEE

== See also ==
- Communes of the Loir-et-Cher department
