= Le Plessis-Dorin =

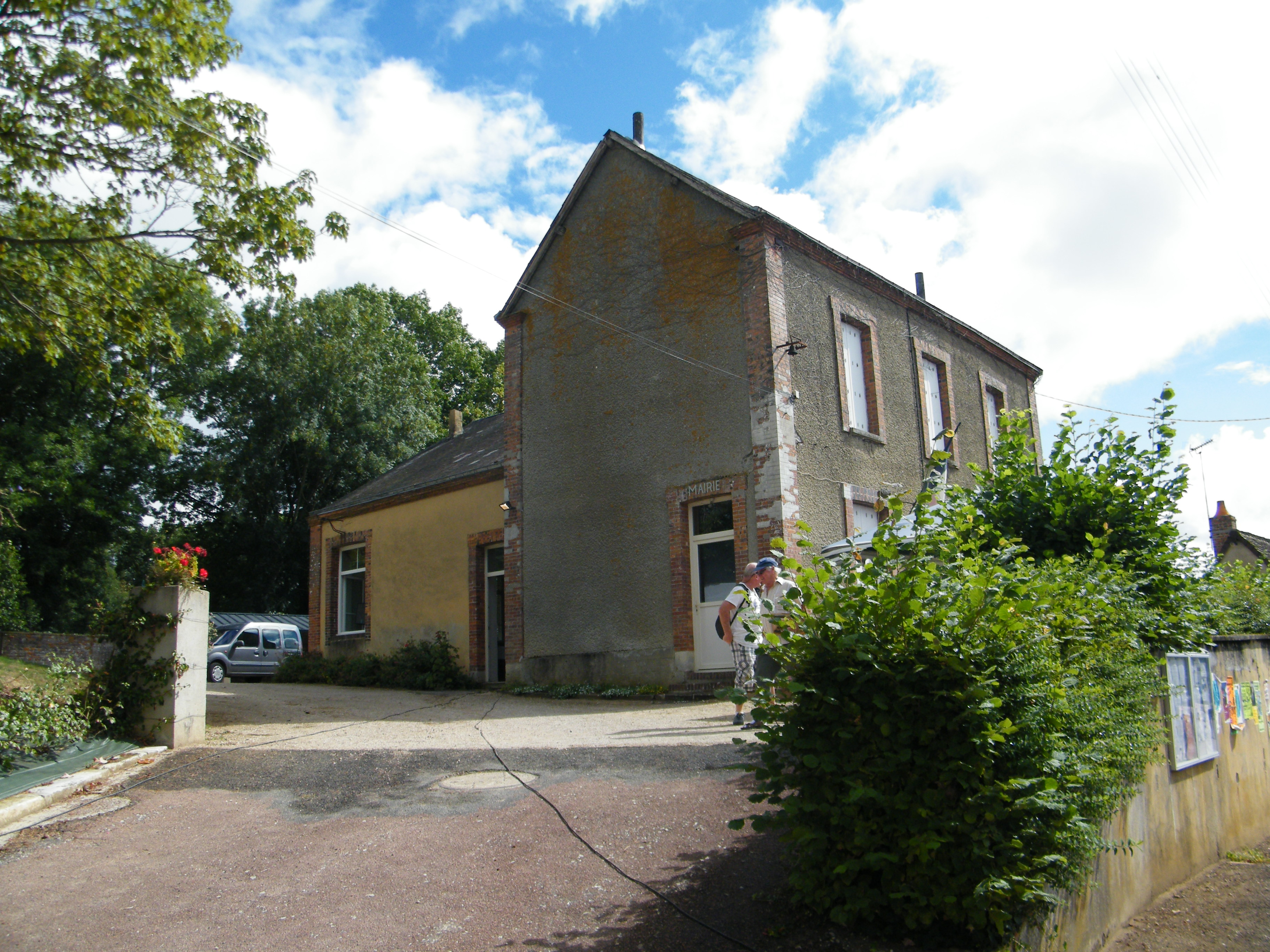
- Town hall

- Coat of arms
- Location of Le Plessis-Dorin
- Location within France Location within Centre-Val de Loire
- Coordinates: 48°05′25″N 0°51′55″E
- Country: France
- Region: Centre-Val de Loire
- Department: Loir-et-Cher
- Arrondissement: Vendôme
- Canton: Le Perche

Government
  - Mayor (2020–2026): Carol Gernot
- Area^{1}: 14.19 km^{2} (5.48 sq mi)
- Elevation: 245 m (804 ft)
- Highest elevation: 249 m (817 ft)
- Lowest elevation: 131 m (430 ft)
- Population (2023): 145
  - Density: 10.2/km^{2} (26.5/sq mi)
- Time zone: UTC+01:00 (CET)
  - Summer (DST): UTC+02:00 (CEST)
- INSEE/Postal code: 41177 /41170
- ^{1} French Land Register data, which excludes lakes, ponds, glaciers > 1 km^{2} (0.386 sq mi or 247 acres) and river estuaries.

Le Plessis-Dorin (French pronunciation: [lə plɛsi dɔʁɛ̃]) is a commune in the Loir-et-Cher department of central France.

== Population ==
Historical population
| Year | Pop. | ±% p.a. |
|---|---|---|
| 1968 | 361 | — |
| 1975 | 298 | −2.70% |
| 1982 | 292 | −0.29% |
| 1990 | 218 | −3.59% |
| 1999 | 202 | −0.84% |
| 2007 | 188 | −0.89% |
| 2012 | 179 | −0.98% |
| 2017 | 167 | −1.38% |
| 2023 | 145 | −2.33% |
Source: INSEE

== See also ==
- Communes of the Loir-et-Cher department
