= Ouzouer-le-Doyen =

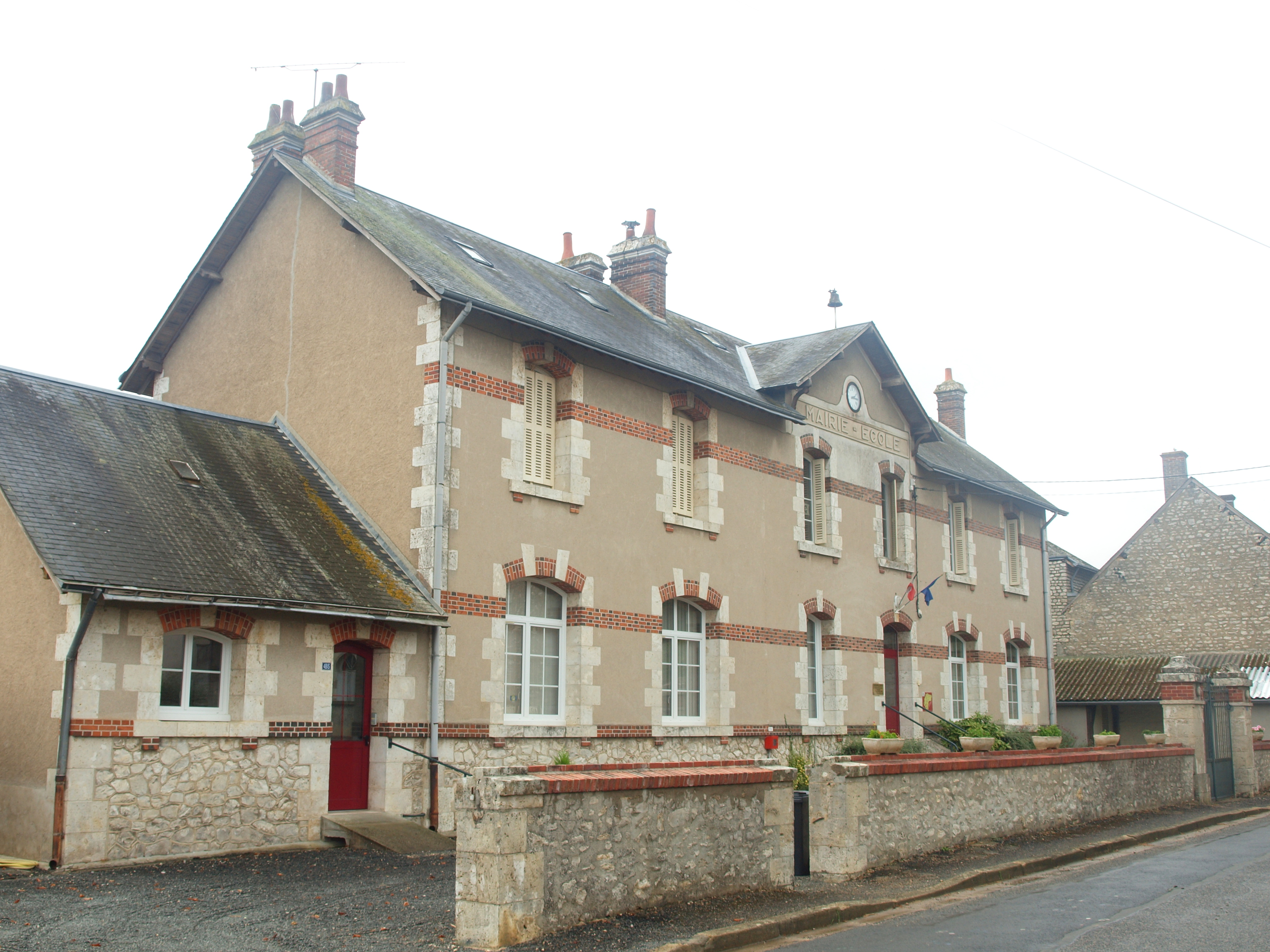
- Town hall

- Coat of arms
- Location of Ouzouer-le-Doyen
- Location within France Location within Centre-Val de Loire
- Coordinates: 47°56′33″N 1°20′28″E
- Country: France
- Region: Centre-Val de Loire
- Department: Loir-et-Cher
- Arrondissement: Vendôme
- Canton: Le Perche

Government
  - Mayor (2020–2026): Robert Bouchet
- Area^{1}: 16.59 km^{2} (6.41 sq mi)
- Elevation: 130 m (430 ft)
- Highest elevation: 133 m (436 ft)
- Lowest elevation: 116 m (381 ft)
- Population (2023): 226
  - Density: 13.6/km^{2} (35.3/sq mi)
- Time zone: UTC+01:00 (CET)
  - Summer (DST): UTC+02:00 (CEST)
- INSEE/Postal code: 41172 /41160
- ^{1} French Land Register data, which excludes lakes, ponds, glaciers > 1 km^{2} (0.386 sq mi or 247 acres) and river estuaries.

Ouzouer-le-Doyen (French pronunciation: [uzwɛʁ lə dwajɛ̃]) is a commune in the Loir-et-Cher department of central France.

== Population ==
Historical population
| Year | Pop. | ±% p.a. |
|---|---|---|
| 1968 | 332 | — |
| 1975 | 271 | −2.86% |
| 1982 | 238 | −1.84% |
| 1990 | 208 | −1.67% |
| 1999 | 167 | −2.41% |
| 2007 | 204 | +2.53% |
| 2012 | 231 | +2.52% |
| 2017 | 243 | +1.02% |
| 2023 | 226 | −1.20% |
Source: INSEE

== See also ==
- Communes of the Loir-et-Cher department
