= Le Poislay =

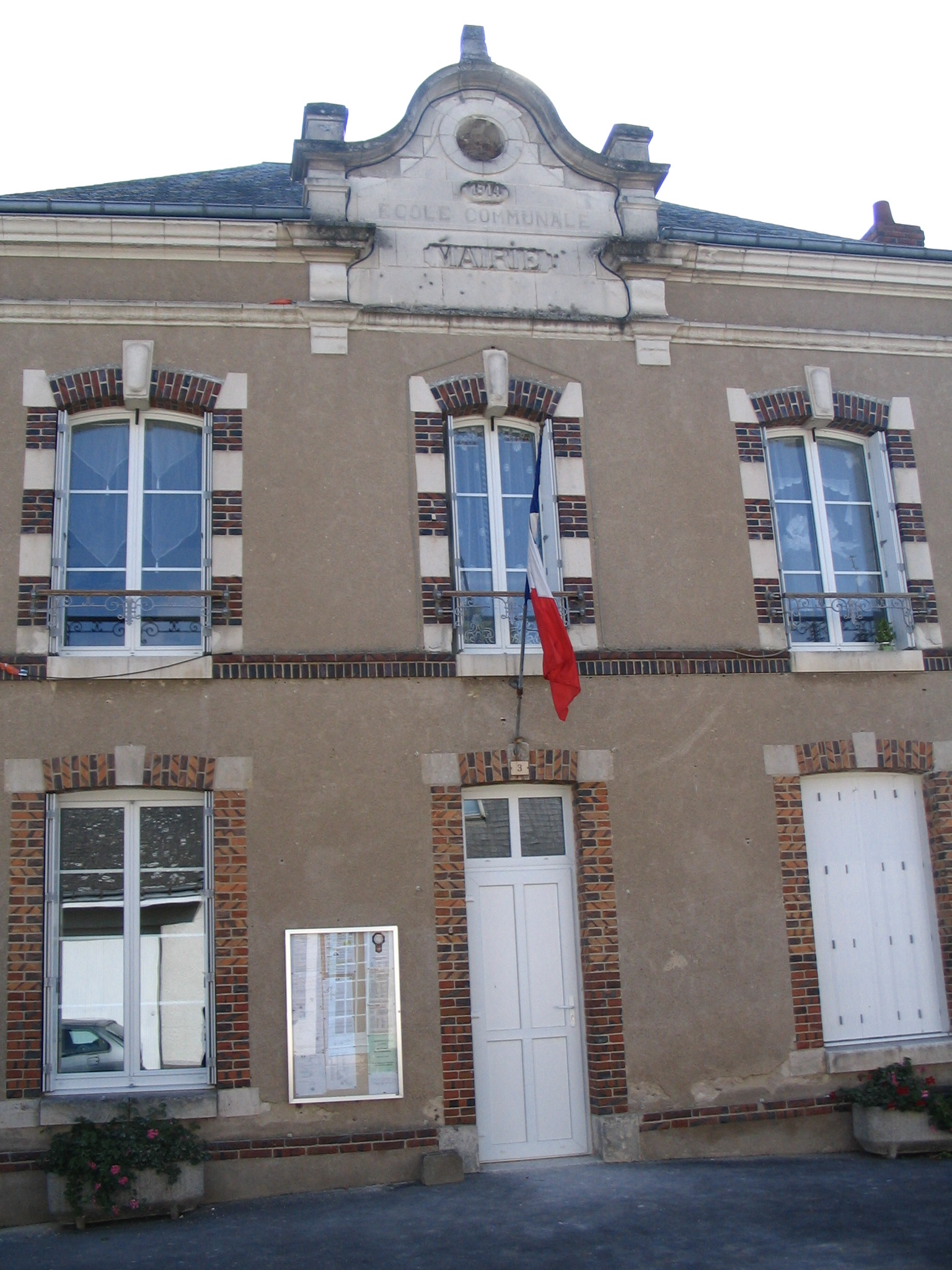
- Town hall

- Coat of arms
- Location of Le Poislay
- Location within France Location within Centre-Val de Loire
- Coordinates: 48°04′05″N 1°04′02″E
- Country: France
- Region: Centre-Val de Loire
- Department: Loir-et-Cher
- Arrondissement: Vendôme
- Canton: Le Perche
- Intercommunality: Perche et Haut Vendômois

Government
  - Mayor (2020–2026): Séverine Coigneau
- Area^{1}: 15.89 km^{2} (6.14 sq mi)
- Elevation: 161 m (528 ft)
- Highest elevation: 202 m (663 ft)
- Lowest elevation: 154 m (505 ft)
- Population (2023): 201
  - Density: 12.6/km^{2} (32.8/sq mi)
- Time zone: UTC+01:00 (CET)
  - Summer (DST): UTC+02:00 (CEST)
- INSEE/Postal code: 41179 /41270
- ^{1} French Land Register data, which excludes lakes, ponds, glaciers > 1 km^{2} (0.386 sq mi or 247 acres) and river estuaries.

Le Poislay (French pronunciation: [lə pwalɛ]) is a commune in the Loir-et-Cher department of central France.

== Population ==
Historical population
Year	Pop.	±% p.a.
1968	305	—
1975	259	−2.31%
1982	232	−1.56%
1990	182	−2.99%
1999	198	+0.94%
2007	214	+0.98%
2012	205	−0.86%
2017	181	−2.46%
2023	201	+1.76%
Source: INSEE

== See also ==
- Communes of the Loir-et-Cher department
