= Saint-Marc-du-Cor =

- Commune
- Coat of arms
- Location of Saint-Marc-du-Cor
- Location within France Location within Centre-Val de Loire
- Coordinates: 47°58′19″N 0°57′15″E
- Country: France
- Region: Centre-Val de Loire
- Department: Loir-et-Cher
- Arrondissement: Vendôme
- Canton: Le Perche
- Intercommunality: Collines du Perche

Government
  - Mayor (2020–2026): Anne Gautier
- Area^{1}: 13.09 km^{2} (5.05 sq mi)
- Elevation: 195 m (640 ft)
- Highest elevation: 216 m (709 ft)
- Lowest elevation: 144 m (472 ft)
- Population (2023): 183
  - Density: 14.0/km^{2} (36.2/sq mi)
- Time zone: UTC+01:00 (CET)
  - Summer (DST): UTC+02:00 (CEST)
- INSEE/Postal code: 41224 /41170
- ^{1} French Land Register data, which excludes lakes, ponds, glaciers > 1 km^{2} (0.386 sq mi or 247 acres) and river estuaries.

Saint-Marc-du-Cor (French pronunciation: [sɛ̃ maʁk dy kɔʁ]) is a commune in the Loir-et-Cher department in central France.

== Population ==
Historical population
Year	Pop.	±% p.a.
1968	254	—
1975	219	−2.10%
1982	206	−0.87%
1990	195	−0.68%
1999	171	−1.45%
2007	183	+0.85%
2012	185	+0.22%
2017	183	−0.22%
2023	183	+0.00%
Source: INSEE

== See also ==
- Communes of the Loir-et-Cher department
