= Renay =

- Commune
- Coat of arms
- Location of Renay
- Location within France Location within Centre-Val de Loire
- Coordinates: 47°50′37″N 1°10′02″E
- Country: France
- Region: Centre-Val de Loire
- Department: Loir-et-Cher
- Arrondissement: Vendôme
- Canton: Le Perche
- Intercommunality: Perche et Haut Vendômois

Government
  - Mayor (2020–2026): Guy Deshayes
- Area^{1}: 12.05 km^{2} (4.65 sq mi)
- Elevation: 138 m (453 ft)
- Highest elevation: 143 m (469 ft)
- Lowest elevation: 90 m (300 ft)
- Population (2023): 174
  - Density: 14.4/km^{2} (37.4/sq mi)
- Time zone: UTC+01:00 (CET)
  - Summer (DST): UTC+02:00 (CEST)
- INSEE/Postal code: 41187 /41100
- ^{1} French Land Register data, which excludes lakes, ponds, glaciers > 1 km^{2} (0.386 sq mi or 247 acres) and river estuaries.

Renay (French pronunciation: [ʁənɛ]) is a commune in the Loir-et-Cher department in central France.

== Population ==
Historical population
Year	Pop.	±% p.a.
1968	126	—
1975	109	−2.05%
1982	116	+0.89%
1990	140	+2.38%
1999	167	+1.98%
2007	172	+0.37%
2012	167	−0.59%
2017	171	+0.47%
2023	174	+0.29%
Source: INSEE

== See also ==
- Communes of the Loir-et-Cher department
