= Ruan-sur-Egvonne =

- Commune
- Coat of arms
- Location of Ruan-sur-Egvonne
- Location within France Location within Centre-Val de Loire
- Coordinates: 48°00′51″N 1°08′47″E
- Country: France
- Region: Centre-Val de Loire
- Department: Loir-et-Cher
- Arrondissement: Vendôme
- Canton: Le Perche

Government
  - Mayor (2020–2026): Alain Brunet
- Area^{1}: 11.35 km^{2} (4.38 sq mi)
- Elevation: 180 m (590 ft)
- Highest elevation: 258 m (846 ft)
- Lowest elevation: 123 m (404 ft)
- Population (2023): 80
  - Density: 7.0/km^{2} (18/sq mi)
- Time zone: UTC+01:00 (CET)
  - Summer (DST): UTC+02:00 (CEST)
- INSEE/Postal code: 41196 /41270
- ^{1} French Land Register data, which excludes lakes, ponds, glaciers > 1 km^{2} (0.386 sq mi or 247 acres) and river estuaries.

Ruan-sur-Egvonne (French pronunciation: [ʁɥɑ̃ syʁ ɛɡvɔn]) is a commune in the Loir-et-Cher department of central France.

== Population ==
Historical population
Year	Pop.	±% p.a.
1968	149	—
1975	121	−2.93%
1982	101	−2.55%
1990	79	−3.02%
1999	93	+1.83%
2007	88	−0.69%
2012	95	+1.54%
2017	94	−0.21%
2023	80	−2.65%
Source: INSEE

== See also ==
- Communes of the Loir-et-Cher department
