= Sougé, Loir-et-Cher =

Sougé
- Commune
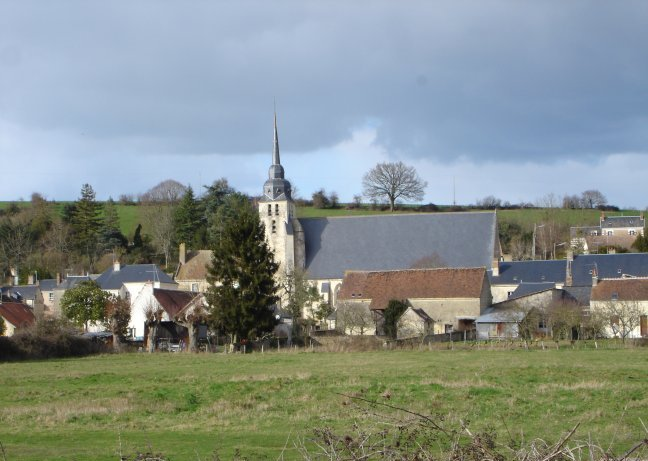

- Coat of arms
- Location of Sougé
- Location within France Location within Centre-Val de Loire
- Coordinates: 47°46′16″N 0°43′43″E
- Country: France
- Region: Centre-Val de Loire
- Department: Loir-et-Cher
- Arrondissement: Vendôme
- Canton: Le Perche
- Intercommunality: CA Territoires Vendômois

Government
  - Mayor (2020–2026): Bernard Bonhomme
- Area^{1}: 16.88 km^{2} (6.52 sq mi)
- Elevation: 62 m (203 ft)
- Highest elevation: 147 m (482 ft)
- Lowest elevation: 56 m (184 ft)
- Population (2023): 484
  - Density: 28.7/km^{2} (74.3/sq mi)
- Time zone: UTC+01:00 (CET)
  - Summer (DST): UTC+02:00 (CEST)
- INSEE/Postal code: 41250 /41800
- ^{1} French Land Register data, which excludes lakes, ponds, glaciers > 1 km^{2} (0.386 sq mi or 247 acres) and river estuaries.

Sougé, also known as Sougé-sur-Braye (French pronunciation: [suʒe syʁ bʁɛ]) for disambiguation, is a commune in the French department of Loir-et-Cher, Centre-Val de Loire region, France.

== History ==
In the time of the Romans, Sougé had a special importance because of his Roman's camp, called "Camp of Cesar" in the country. Today the fortifications are not visible any longer, but they were visible in the last century.

== Geography ==
Sougé is a village in the department of Loir-et-Cher, situated on the river Loir. The village of Sougé is near the village of Couture-sur-Loir (the village of Pierre de Ronsard) and the town of Montoire-sur-le-Loir. The nearest town of more than 40,000 inhabitants is Tours.

== Name ==
Sougé was called Silviacus (3rd and 8th century), then Selgiacus (11th century), Sugeium in 1216, Sougeium in the 13th century, paroisse des Roches de Sougé in 1595, Sougé-sur-Loir in 1675, Sougé-sur-Braye after the French Revolution, and now Sougé.

== Population ==
Historical population
| Year | Pop. | ±% p.a. |
|---|---|---|
| 1968 | 570 | — |
| 1975 | 518 | −1.36% |
| 1982 | 493 | −0.70% |
| 1990 | 462 | −0.81% |
| 1999 | 437 | −0.62% |
| 2007 | 475 | +1.05% |
| 2012 | 478 | +0.13% |
| 2017 | 479 | +0.04% |
| 2023 | 484 | +0.17% |
Source: INSEE

== Sights ==
The spacious church of St. Quintin has a barrel-vaulted roof and early twentieth century glass depicting amongst other themes Pope Leo XIII. There are traces of Renaissance architecture along the main (and almost only) street. The village cemetery contains Commonwealth graves.

== See also ==
- Communes of the Loir-et-Cher department
