= Cormenon =

- Commune
- Coat of arms
- Location of Cormenon
- Location within France Location within Centre-Val de Loire
- Coordinates: 47°58′09″N 0°53′40″E
- Country: France
- Region: Centre-Val de Loire
- Department: Loir-et-Cher
- Arrondissement: Vendôme
- Canton: Le Perche
- Intercommunality: Collines du Perche

Government
  - Mayor (2020–2026): Gilles Boulay
- Area^{1}: 5.76 km^{2} (2.22 sq mi)
- Elevation: 110 m (360 ft)
- Highest elevation: 210 m (690 ft)
- Lowest elevation: 102 m (335 ft)
- Population (2023): 679
  - Density: 118/km^{2} (305/sq mi)
- Time zone: UTC+01:00 (CET)
  - Summer (DST): UTC+02:00 (CEST)
- INSEE/Postal code: 41060 /41170
- ^{1} French Land Register data, which excludes lakes, ponds, glaciers > 1 km^{2} (0.386 sq mi or 247 acres) and river estuaries.

Cormenon (French pronunciation: [kɔʁmənɔ̃]) is a commune in the Loir-et-Cher department of central France.

== Population ==
Historical population
Year	Pop.	±% p.a.
1968	655	—
1975	756	+2.07%
1982	733	−0.44%
1990	717	−0.28%
1999	690	−0.43%
2007	695	+0.09%
2012	695	+0.00%
2017	690	−0.14%
2023	679	−0.27%
Source: INSEE

== See also ==
- Communes of the Loir-et-Cher department
