= Le Safran de la Chapelle-Vicomtesse =

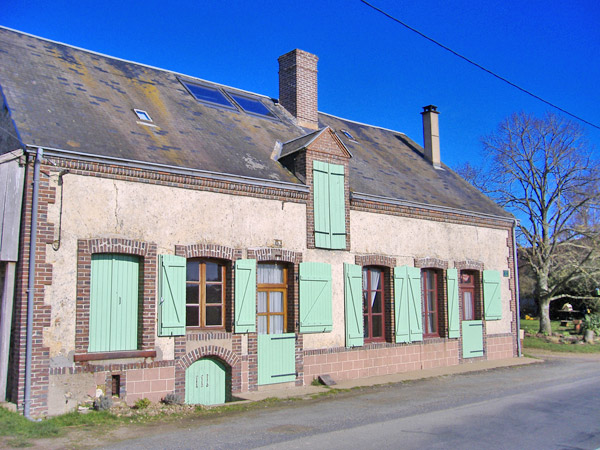
Le Safran de la Chapelle Vicomtesse

Le Safran de la Chapelle Vicomtesse are producers of Saffron in the Loir-et-Cher region of France. In 2009 they won Le Top tourisme of Loir-et-Cher and the Prix Talent 2007.

== History ==
Founded by Fabrice Bauer and Stephan Thevenet in 2007.

== Activities ==
Le Safran de la Chapelle Vicomtesse harvests saffron, makes jams (Plaisirs Safranes) and invites the public through daily visits. They are also one of the rare saffron makers of France that teaches individuals or groups how to grow, harvest and sell saffron.
