= Lignières, Loir-et-Cher =

Lignières
- Commune
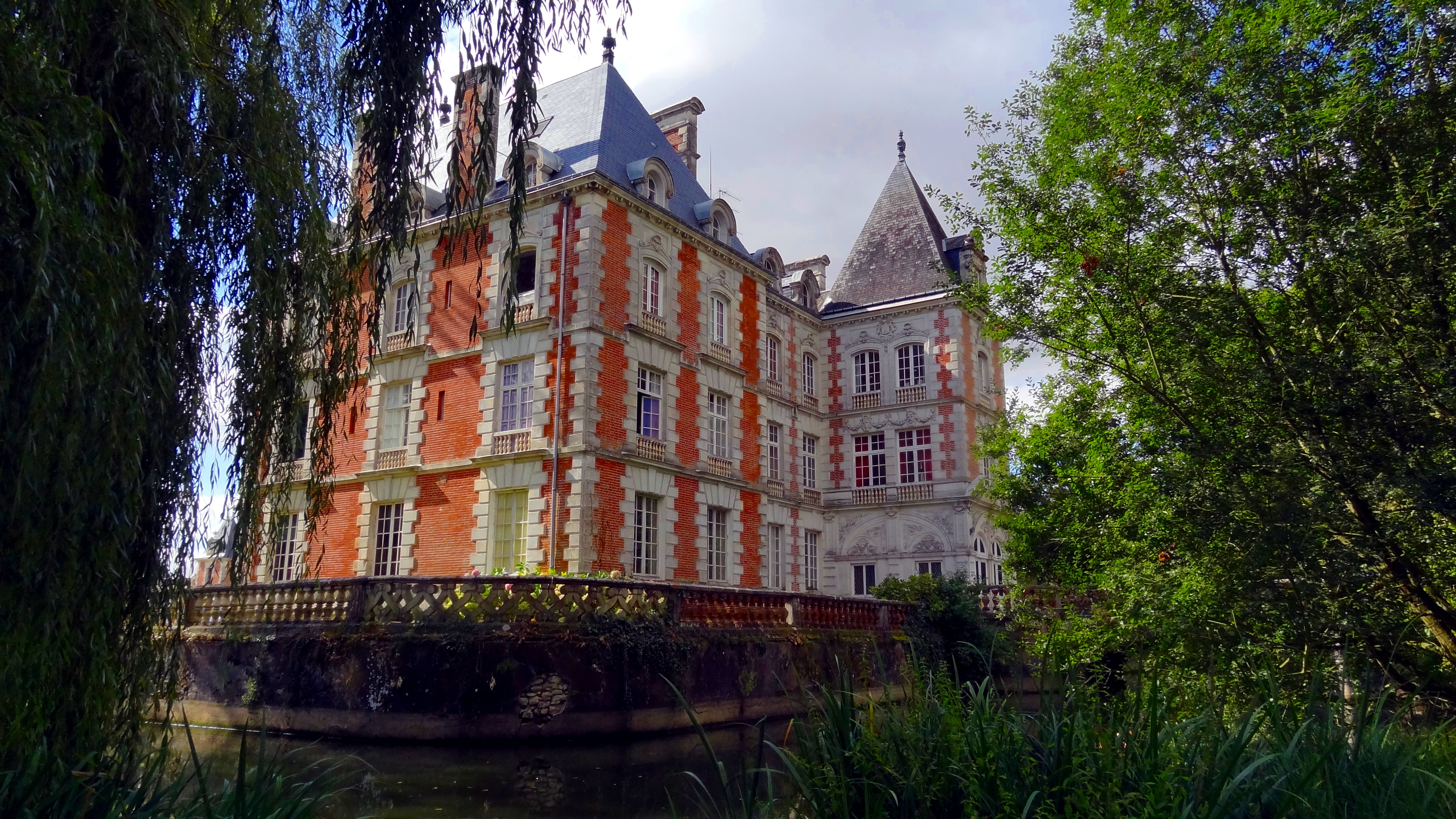
- Château of Rocheux

- Coat of arms
- Location of Lignières
- Location within France Location within Centre-Val de Loire
- Coordinates: 47°51′58″N 1°11′02″E
- Country: France
- Region: Centre-Val de Loire
- Department: Loir-et-Cher
- Arrondissement: Vendôme
- Canton: Le Perche
- Intercommunality: Perche et Haut Vendômois

Government
  - Mayor (2020–2026): Patrice Couty
- Area^{1}: 15.77 km^{2} (6.09 sq mi)
- Elevation: 120 m (390 ft)
- Highest elevation: 149 m (489 ft)
- Lowest elevation: 84 m (276 ft)
- Population (2023): 412
  - Density: 26.1/km^{2} (67.7/sq mi)
- Demonym(s): Ligniérois, Ligniéroises
- Time zone: UTC+01:00 (CET)
  - Summer (DST): UTC+02:00 (CEST)
- INSEE/Postal code: 41115 /41160
- ^{1} French Land Register data, which excludes lakes, ponds, glaciers > 1 km^{2} (0.386 sq mi or 247 acres) and river estuaries.

Lignières (French pronunciation: [liɲjɛʁ]) is a commune in the Loir-et-Cher department of central France.

== Population ==
Historical population
Year	Pop.	±% p.a.
1968	335	—
1975	296	−1.75%
1982	294	−0.10%
1990	315	+0.87%
1999	376	+1.99%
2007	398	+0.71%
2012	422	+1.18%
2017	380	−2.07%
2023	412	+1.36%
Source: INSEE

== See also ==
- Communes of the Loir-et-Cher department
