= Cheverny AOC =

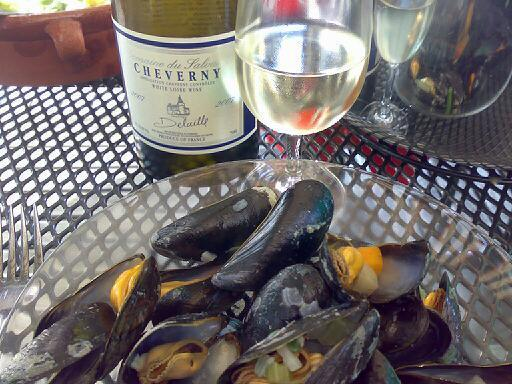
A white Cheverny wine paired with mussels.

Cheverny (French pronunciation: [ʃəvɛʁni]) is a French wine region in the Loire Valley that makes dry white wines, light red wines and rosé wines. The area received AOVDQS (Appellation d'Origine Vin Délimité de Qualité Supérieure) status in 1973, and then AOC (Appellation d'Origine Contrôlée) on 26 March 1993 when new regulatory laws were passed. The wine region is spread over 532 hectares, within 24 communes of the Loir-et-Cher department.

The white wines are composed of Sauvignon blanc grapes, at a proportion of 60%–80%, blended with Arbois, Chardonnay or Pineau Blanc de la Loire grapes. A small proportion is made into sparkling wine. The red wines are composed of Gamay grapes, at a proportion of 40%–65%, blended with Pinot noir grapes. Cabernet Franc and Côt can be used to make up to 15% of the wine. Pineau d'Aunis is added to these grape varieties when making rosés.

== AOC regulations ==
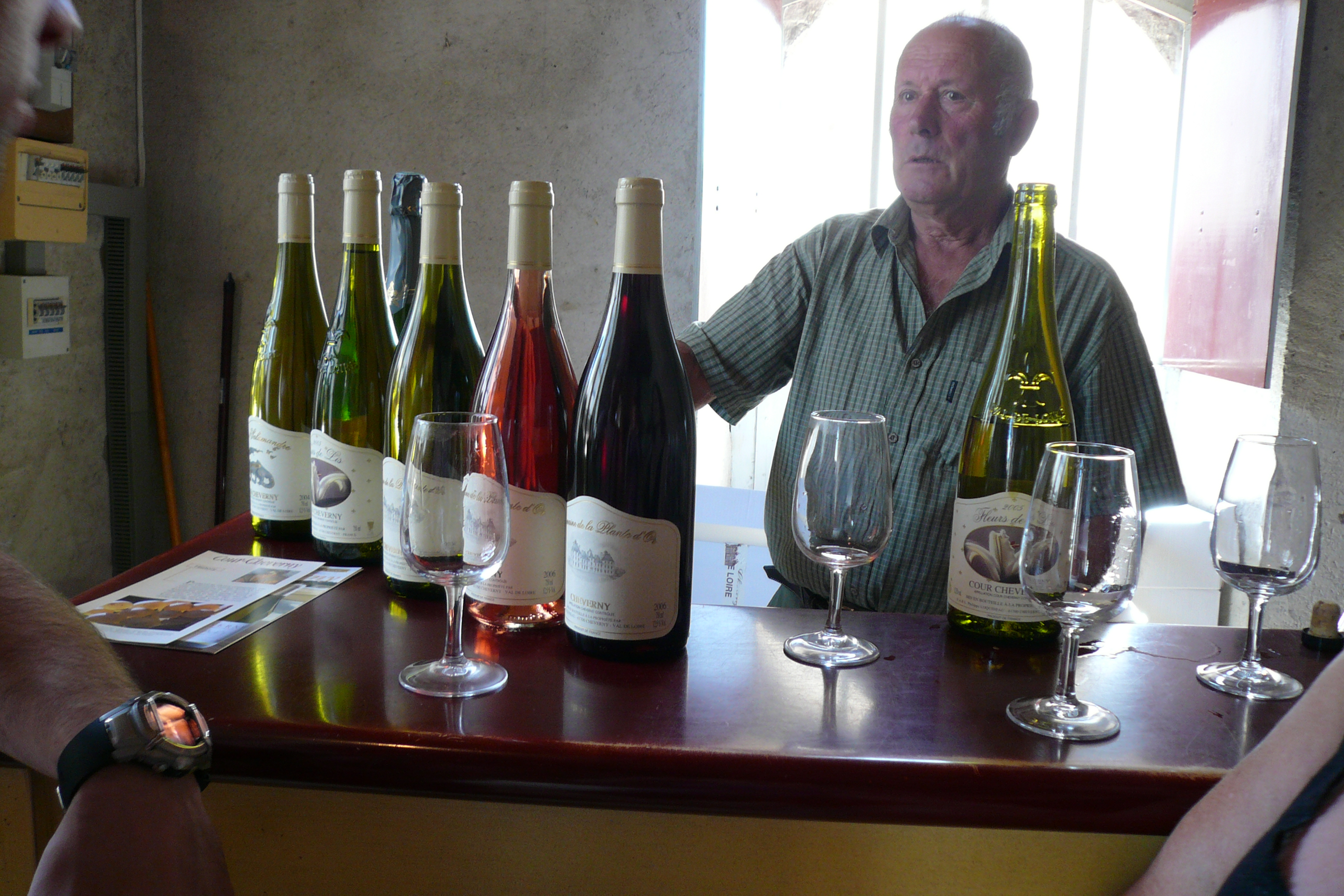
A tasting room of a co-operative featuring the local wines of Cheverny.

Base yield is fixed at 50 hl/ha for red wines, 55 hl/ha for rosé wines and 60hl/ha for white wines. The density of vine plantations should be between 3500 and 4500 feet/ha. White wines made from Romorantin grapes bear the appellation of Cour-Cheverny.

== Area of production ==
Only wines made from grapes grown on the land of the following 24 communes can claim Cheverny appellation: Candé-sur-Beuvron, Cellettes, Cheverny, Chitenay, Cormeray, Cour-Cheverny, Feings, Fougères-sur-Bièvre, Fresnes, Huisseau-sur-Cosson, Maslives, Les Montils, Montlivault, Mont-près-Chambord, Muides-sur-Loire, Ouchamps, Saint-Claude-de-Diray, Saint-Dyé-sur-Loire, Saint-Laurent-Nouan, Sambin, Seur, Tour-en-Sologne and Vineuil, as well as a part of the Monthou-sur-Bièvre commune.
