= Bauzy =

- Commune
- Location of Bauzy
- Location within France Location within Centre-Val de Loire
- Coordinates: 47°32′10″N 1°36′32″E
- Country: France
- Region: Centre-Val de Loire
- Department: Loir-et-Cher
- Arrondissement: Blois
- Canton: Chambord
- Intercommunality: Grand Chambord

Government
  - Mayor (2020–2026): Henry Lemaignen
- Area^{1}: 24.7 km^{2} (9.5 sq mi)
- Elevation: 85 m (279 ft)
- Highest elevation: 113 m (371 ft)
- Lowest elevation: 79 m (259 ft)
- Population (2023): 270
  - Density: 11/km^{2} (28/sq mi)
- Time zone: UTC+01:00 (CET)
  - Summer (DST): UTC+02:00 (CEST)
- INSEE/Postal code: 41013 /41250
- ^{1} French Land Register data, which excludes lakes, ponds, glaciers > 1 km^{2} (0.386 sq mi or 247 acres) and river estuaries.

Bauzy (French pronunciation: [bozi]) is a commune in the Loir-et-Cher department in the Centre region of central France.

The inhabitants of the commune are known as Bauziens or Bauziennes.

== Geography ==
Bauzy is located in the heart of Sologne some 20 km south-east of Blois, 40 km south-west of Orléans, and 40 km north-east of Vierzon. Access to the commune is by the D60 road from Bracieux in the north-west which passes through the heart of the commune and the village and continues south-east to Vernou-en-Sologne. Apart from the village there is the hamlet of La Boulaie in the south-east. The commune is mixed forest and farmland.

The commune is dotted with many small lakes including the Étang d'Avaray, the Étang de l'Oie, and the Étang Saulier plus numerous others. The Beuvron river flows through the north-east of the commune from south-east to north-west and continues to join the Loire at Candé-sur-Beuvron. The Bonne Heure stream flows through the middle of the commune and the village from south-east to north-west where it joins the Beuvron at Bracieux. Many small tributaries feed the Bonne Heure from the numerous lakes.

== Toponymy ==
Bauzy comes from the Low Latin Balaesiacus and Balaesius and its variant Valesisus and the possessive suffix -acus giving Domain of Balaesiacus.

Bauzy was mentioned as: Bauzi in January 1365; Bauzy and Bauzi in February 1365 and January 1365; Bauzy in February 1365; and Bauzy en Sologne on 24 July 1376.

The Parish was split up for the creation of the Parish of Fontaines-en-Sologne.

Bauzy appears as Bauzy on the 1750 Cassini Map and the same on the 1790 version.

== Administration ==
List of Successive Mayors

From	To	Name
1913	1951	Louis Lemaignen
1951	2004	Gérard Lemaignen
2005	2020	Jean Paul Touchet
2020	2026	Henry Lemaignen

== Population ==
Historical population

Year	Pop.	±% p.a.
1793	336	—
1821	351	+0.16%
1846	314	−0.44%
1872	308	−0.07%
1901	326	+0.20%
1926	278	−0.64%
1946	246	−0.61%
1954	233	−0.68%
1962	194	−2.26%

Year	Pop.	±% p.a.
1968	211	+1.41%
1975	161	−3.79%
1982	185	+2.00%
1990	234	+2.98%
1999	257	+1.05%
2007	263	+0.29%
2012	273	+0.75%
2017	278	+0.36%
2023	270	−0.49%

Source: EHESS and INSEE

== Culture and heritage ==
=== Civil heritage ===
- The Boudeux Fountain just outside the village on the left towards Neuvy.

The commune has a number of buildings and sites that are registered as historical monuments:

- A Farmhouse at Villevaudran (19th century)
- A Chateau at Veillenne (1846)
- A Farmhouse at Rivaude (16th century)
- A Farmhouse at La Boulaie (16th century)
- A Unidentified Edifice (High Middle Ages)
- A House (1863)
- Farmhouses (16th-19th century)
- Houses (16th-20th century)

=== Religious heritage ===
The commune has several religious buildings and sites that are registered as historical monuments:

- A Wayside Cross at La Rivière (1891)
- A Monumental Cross (19th century)
- The Parish Church of Saint Baumer (12th century) The church contains a large number of items that are registered as historical objects.

== Personalities ==
- Gérard Lemaignen (Margency, 11 September 1924 - 22 December 2004), President of the joint committee for country chateaux, President of the Community of communes of Pays de Chambord, Mayor of Bauzy from 1952 to 2004
- Louis Lemaignen (Blois, 4 July 1856 - Blois, 27 December 1951), grandfather of Gérard, Mayor of Bauzy for 39 years.

== See also ==
- Communes of the Loir-et-Cher department
