= Daniel Brottier =

French Roman Catholic priest

Blessed Daniel Brottier C.S.Sp.
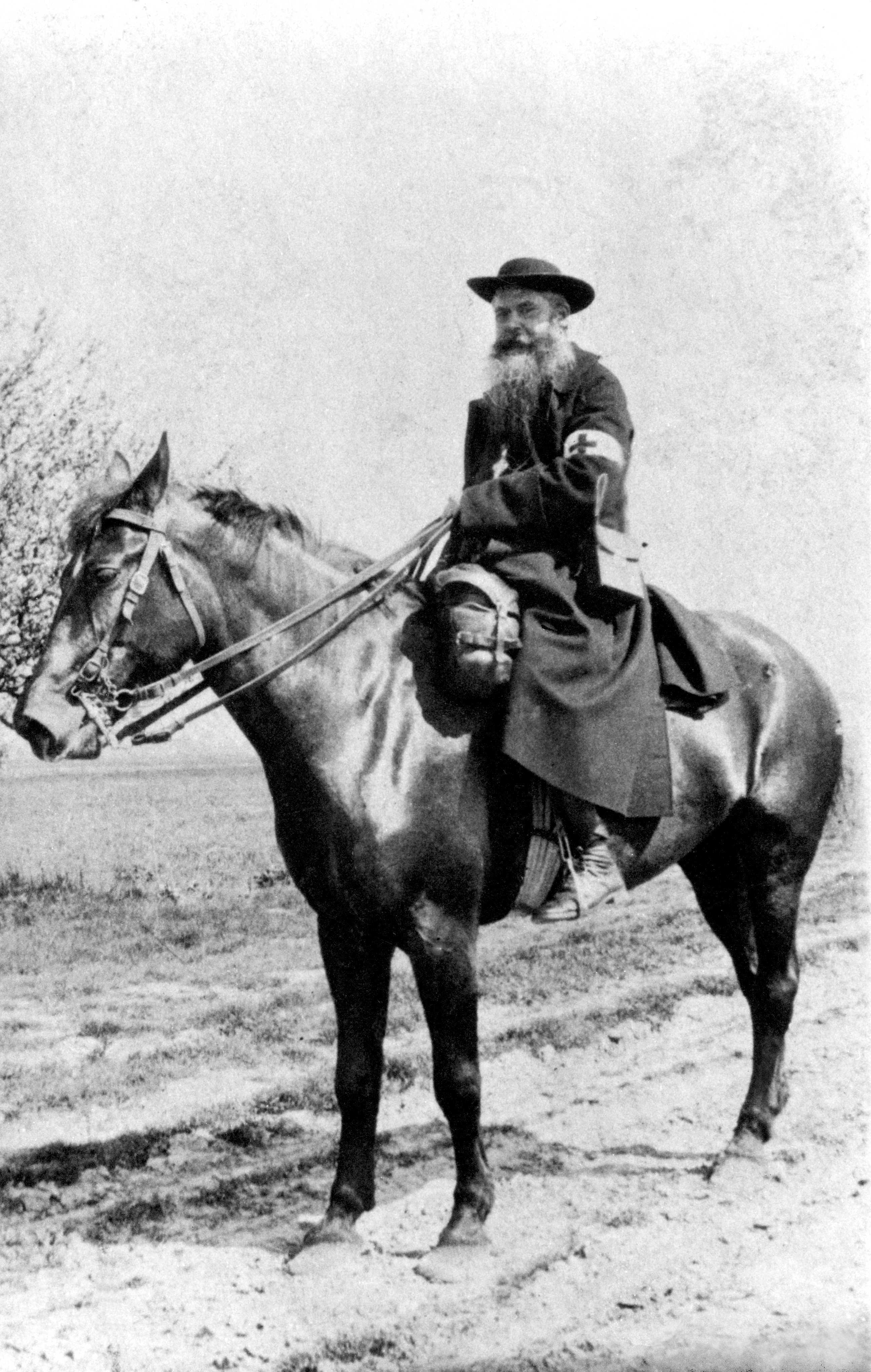
- Blessed Daniel Brottier while serving as military chaplain for the French Army during the First World War.
- Born: 7 September 1876; La Ferté-Saint-Cyr, Loir-et-Cher, France
- Died: February 28, 1936 (aged 59); Paris, France
- Venerated in: Roman Catholic Church (Holy Ghost Fathers)
- Beatified: 25 November 1984, Paris, France, by Pope John Paul II
- Feast: 28 February

Daniel Jules Alexis Brottier, C.S.Sp. (7 September 1876 – 28 February 1936), was a French Roman Catholic priest in the Congregation of the Holy Spirit (Spiritans). He was awarded the Croix de Guerre and the Légion d'honneur for his services as a chaplain during World War I, did missionary work in Senegal, and administered an orphanage in Auteuil, a suburb of Paris. He was declared venerable in 1983, and then beatified on the 25 November 1984, by Pope John Paul II.

== Biography ==
=== Early life ===
Brottier was born in La Ferté-Saint-Cyr, a commune in the Loir-et-Cher Department of France on 7 September 1876, the second son of Jean-Baptiste Brottier, coachman for the Marquis Durfort, and his wife Herminie (née Bouthe). A story from his childhood recounts that his mother asked him what he would like to be when he grew up. Daniel's answer was, "I won't be either a general or a pastry chef—I will be the Pope!" His mother reminded him that to be the pope, he would first have to become a priest. Little Daniel piped up, "Well, then I'll become a priest!" ^{[a]} At the age of 10, Brottier made his First Communion, and enrolled a year later in the minor seminary at Blois. In 1896, at the age of 20, he did one year of military service at Blois. He was ordained on 22 October 1899, after which he was assigned to teach for three years at a secondary school in Pontlevoy, France.

=== Missionary work in Africa ===
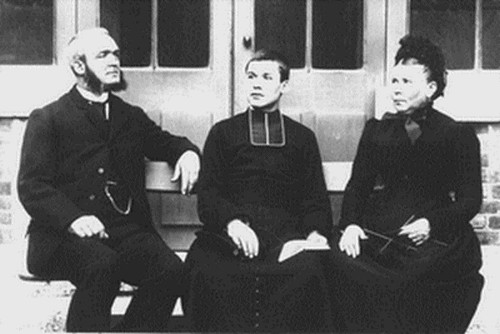
A young Father Brottier in 1903, ready to set out for Senegal, posed for a picture with his parents, Jean-Baptiste and Herminie

Restless in his life as a teacher and determined to be a missionary, the young Abbé Brottier joined the Congregation of the Holy Spirit at Orly in 1902. After completing his novitiate, Brottier was sent by the congregation to serve as a vicar in a mission parish in Saint-Louis, Senegal in 1903. He was disappointed that he had been assigned to a city rather than the more difficult interior.

Nevertheless, Brottier immediately set to work. He gave weekly instructions to secondary school students, founded a center for child welfare, and published a parish bulletin, The Echo of St. Louis. His health suffered from the climate, however, and he spent a six-month period of convalescence in France in 1906. In 1911 his poor health would force him to return to France for good.

After his final departure from Senegal, Brottier spent a brief, but personally significant, stay at the Trappist monastery at Lérins—the same island monastery associated with Saint Patrick's preparation for evangelization in Ireland. Brottier had felt called to a more contemplative life than he had been living as a missionary in Africa, but the stay at Lérins rid him of that idea. As Brottier wrote to his sisters, "I lived unforgettable hours in the recollection of the cloister in an atmosphere of sacrifice and immolation. But the lack of sleep, and especially of food, wore me down, and after a few days I had to yield to the evidence: I was not made for this kind of life".

Even after he had left Senegal, Brottier was asked by Bishop Hyacinthe Jalabert, the Apostolic Vicar of Senegal, to conduct a fund-raising campaign to build a cathedral in Dakar. To this end, Brottier was appointed the Vicar General of Dakar, even though he was residing in Paris. Brottier focused on this project for seven years over two periods (i.e., 1911–1914 and 1919–1923), the interlude being a result of the First World War. The so-called "African Memorial Cathedral" was consecrated on February 2, 1936, just a few weeks before Brottier's death.

My secret is this: help yourself and heaven will help you. ... I have no other secret. If the good God worked miracles [at Auteuil], through Thérèse's intercession, I think I can say in all justice that we did everything, humanly speaking, to be deserving, and that they were the divine reward of our work, prayers and trust in providence.

— Daniel Brottier

=== Service during World War I ===
At the outbreak of the First World War, Brottier became a volunteer chaplain for France's 121st Infantry Regiment. He was cited six times for bravery, and awarded the Croix de guerre and the Légion d'honneur. He attributed his survival on the front lines to the intercession of St. Thérèse of Lisieux, and built a chapel for her at Auteuil when she was canonized: the first church dedicated to the saint. After the war, Brottier founded the National Union of Servicemen (L'Union Nationale des Combattants), an organization of French veterans of various conflicts.

=== Work with the orphans of Auteuil ===
In November 1923, the Cardinal Archbishop of Paris, Louis-Ernest Dubois, asked the Congregation of the Holy Spirit to assume charge of an orphanage in an arrondissement of Paris, the Orphan Apprentices of Auteuil. Brottier, with his associate chaplain Yves Pichon, labored for 13 years to expand the facilities and worked for the welfare of the orphans. He dedicated his work to two aims: to save the most poor and unfortunate, and to dedicate those efforts to the intercession of Saint Thérèse. In 1933, Brottier pioneered a program that placed the children in the households of Catholic paysans associated with the Orphan Apprentices. The fruit of his labors at Auteuil included the construction of workshops, opening a printing house and a cinema, and launching magazines. At the time of his arrival, the facility was in charge of 140 orphans; when Brottier died, there were more than 1,400.

Particularly notable of Brottier's work with the orphans of Auteuil, and perhaps of his work in general, was his eagerness to expand to previously unexplored means of seeking financial support. An example of this is that he mastered the art of the camera and offered instruction on film making to the children. He even produced a popular film on the life of his personal patron, Saint Thérèse.

Brottier died on 28 February 1936 in the Hospital of St. Joseph in Paris. Fifteen thousand Parisians attended his funeral Mass. He was buried in the Chapel of St. Thérèse in Auteuil on 5 April 1936.

== Veneration ==
Brottier was declared venerable on 13 January 1983 with a decree of heroic virtue by Pope John Paul II. He was beatified by John Paul II in Paris on 25 November 1984. The cause for his canonization was greatly advanced by the claim, in 1962, that his body was as intact as on the day of his burial. In addition, many miracles have been attributed to his intercession. His feast day is celebrated by the Spiritan Fathers on 28 February.

== Legacy ==
A residence hall at Duquesne University—an American university founded and administered by the Spiritan Fathers—is named Brottier Hall in memory of Blessed Daniel Brottier.

Brottier Refugee Services is a Non Profit organization set up to assist private sponsors welcome refugees to Canada.

== Selected bibliography ==
- Delgado, Pierre (1946). Un grand ami des enfants. Le père Brottier (in French). Paris.
- Cristiani, Léon (1963). Le Serviteur de Dieu, Daniel Brottier (in French). France-Empire.
- Gilbert, Alphonse (2000). Le bienheureux Daniel Brottier (in French). Paris: Sarment-Fayard. ISBN 2-86679-285-8.
- Grach, Antoine (2006). Le bienheureux père Daniel Brottier, 1876-1936. Du Sénégal à l'œuvre d'Auteuil (in French). Karthala. ISBN 2-84586-791-3.
- O'Carroll, Michael (1944). Disciples of Saint Thérèse of Lisieux (On Pope Pius XI., Marie, sister of Saint Theresa, and Daniel Brottier. With portraits). Dublin: Catholic Truth Society of Ireland.
- Pichon, Yves (1954). Le Père Brottier, 1876–1936 (in French). L'Oeuvre d'Auteuil.
- Vast, Jean (1984). Père Daniel Brottier : missionnaire à Saint-Louis du Sénégal (in French). Saint-Louis: Unir.

== Notes ==
- ^{1} In French, the story runs as follows. MOTHER: Que seras-tu plus tard? — DANIEL: Plus tard, maman je ne serai ni patissier ni général, je serai pape! — MOTHER: Pour devenir Pape, il faut devenir prêtre. — DANIEL: Et bien je serai prêtre.
