= Canton of Chambord =

Administrative division of Loir-et-Cher, France

Coordinates: 47.62°N 1.52°E

A map of the canton of Chambord in the Loir-et-Cher department

The canton of Chambord (French: Canton de Chambord) is a canton (an administrative division) of the Loir-et-Cher department, central France. Its seat is Chambord. It was created at the canton reorganisation that came into effect in March 2015. Since then, it elects two members of the Departmental Council of Loir-et-Cher.

== Composition ==
The canton of Chambord consists of the following communes:

1. Bauzy
2. Bracieux
3. Chambord
4. Courmemin
5. Crouy-sur-Cosson
6. Dhuizon
7. La Ferté-Beauharnais
8. La Ferté-Saint-Cyr
9. Fontaines-en-Sologne
10. Huisseau-sur-Cosson
11. La Marolle-en-Sologne
12. Maslives
13. Montlivault
14. Mont-près-Chambord
15. Montrieux-en-Sologne
16. Neung-sur-Beuvron
17. Neuvy
18. Saint-Claude-de-Diray
19. Saint-Dyé-sur-Loire
20. Saint-Laurent-Nouan
21. Thoury
22. Tour-en-Sologne
23. Villeny
