= Fontaines-en-Sologne =

- Commune
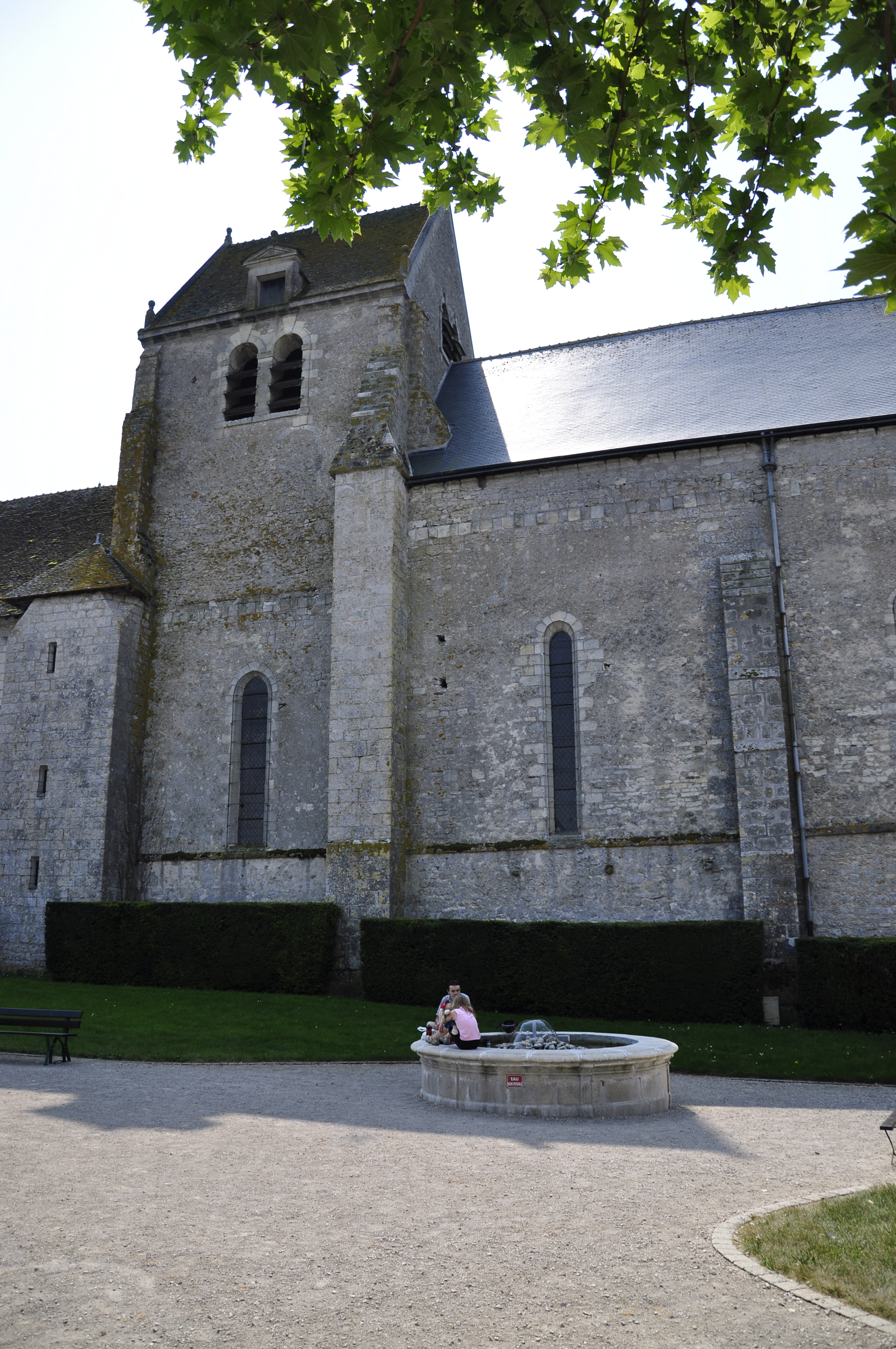
- Church of Our Lady
- Location of Fontaines-en-Sologne
- Location within France Location within Centre-Val de Loire
- Coordinates: 47°30′37″N 1°33′06″E
- Country: France
- Region: Centre-Val de Loire
- Department: Loir-et-Cher
- Arrondissement: Blois
- Canton: Chambord
- Intercommunality: Grand Chambord

Government
  - Mayor (2020–2026): Gérard Baron
- Area^{1}: 46.25 km^{2} (17.86 sq mi)
- Elevation: 117 m (384 ft)
- Highest elevation: 119 m (390 ft)
- Lowest elevation: 80 m (260 ft)
- Population (2023): 661
  - Density: 14.3/km^{2} (37.0/sq mi)
- Time zone: UTC+01:00 (CET)
  - Summer (DST): UTC+02:00 (CEST)
- INSEE/Postal code: 41086 /41250
- ^{1} French Land Register data, which excludes lakes, ponds, glaciers > 1 km^{2} (0.386 sq mi or 247 acres) and river estuaries.

Fontaines-en-Sologne (French pronunciation: [fɔ̃tɛn ɑ̃ sɔlɔɲ], lit. 'Fontaines in Sologne') is a commune in the Loir-et-Cher department, central France.

== Population ==
Historical population
Year	Pop.	±% p.a.
1968	781	—
1975	706	−1.43%
1982	568	−3.06%
1990	520	−1.10%
1999	519	−0.02%
2007	582	+1.44%
2012	642	+1.98%
2017	633	−0.28%
2023	661	+0.72%
Source: INSEE

== See also ==
- Communes of the Loir-et-Cher department
