= Mont-près-Chambord =

- Commune
- Coat of arms
- Location of Mont-près-Chambord
- Location within France Location within Centre-Val de Loire
- Coordinates: 47°33′49″N 1°27′47″E
- Country: France
- Region: Centre-Val de Loire
- Department: Loir-et-Cher
- Arrondissement: Blois
- Canton: Chambord

Government
  - Mayor (2020–2026): Gilles Clément
- Area^{1}: 28.51 km^{2} (11.01 sq mi)
- Elevation: 94 m (308 ft)
- Highest elevation: 123 m (404 ft)
- Lowest elevation: 72 m (236 ft)
- Population (2023): 3,386
  - Density: 118.8/km^{2} (307.6/sq mi)
- Time zone: UTC+01:00 (CET)
  - Summer (DST): UTC+02:00 (CEST)
- INSEE/Postal code: 41150 /41250
- ^{1} French Land Register data, which excludes lakes, ponds, glaciers > 1 km^{2} (0.386 sq mi or 247 acres) and river estuaries.

Mont-près-Chambord (French pronunciation: [mɔ̃ pʁɛ ʃɑ̃bɔʁ], literally Mount near Chambord) is a commune in the Loir-et-Cher department, Centre-Val de Loire, France.

== Population ==
Historical population

Year	Pop.	±% p.a.
1793	1,230	—
1821	1,243	+0.04%
1846	1,442	+0.60%
1872	1,658	+0.54%
1901	1,422	−0.53%
1926	1,266	−0.46%
1946	1,196	−0.28%
1962	1,249	+0.27%
1968	1,261	+0.16%

Year	Pop.	±% p.a.
1975	1,643	+3.85%
1982	2,413	+5.64%
1990	2,786	+1.81%
1999	3,025	+0.92%
2007	3,242	+0.87%
2012	3,220	−0.14%
2017	3,297	+0.47%
2023	3,386	+0.44%

Source: EHESS and INSEE (1968-2023)

== See also ==
- Communes of the Loir-et-Cher department
