= Huisseau-sur-Cosson =

- Commune
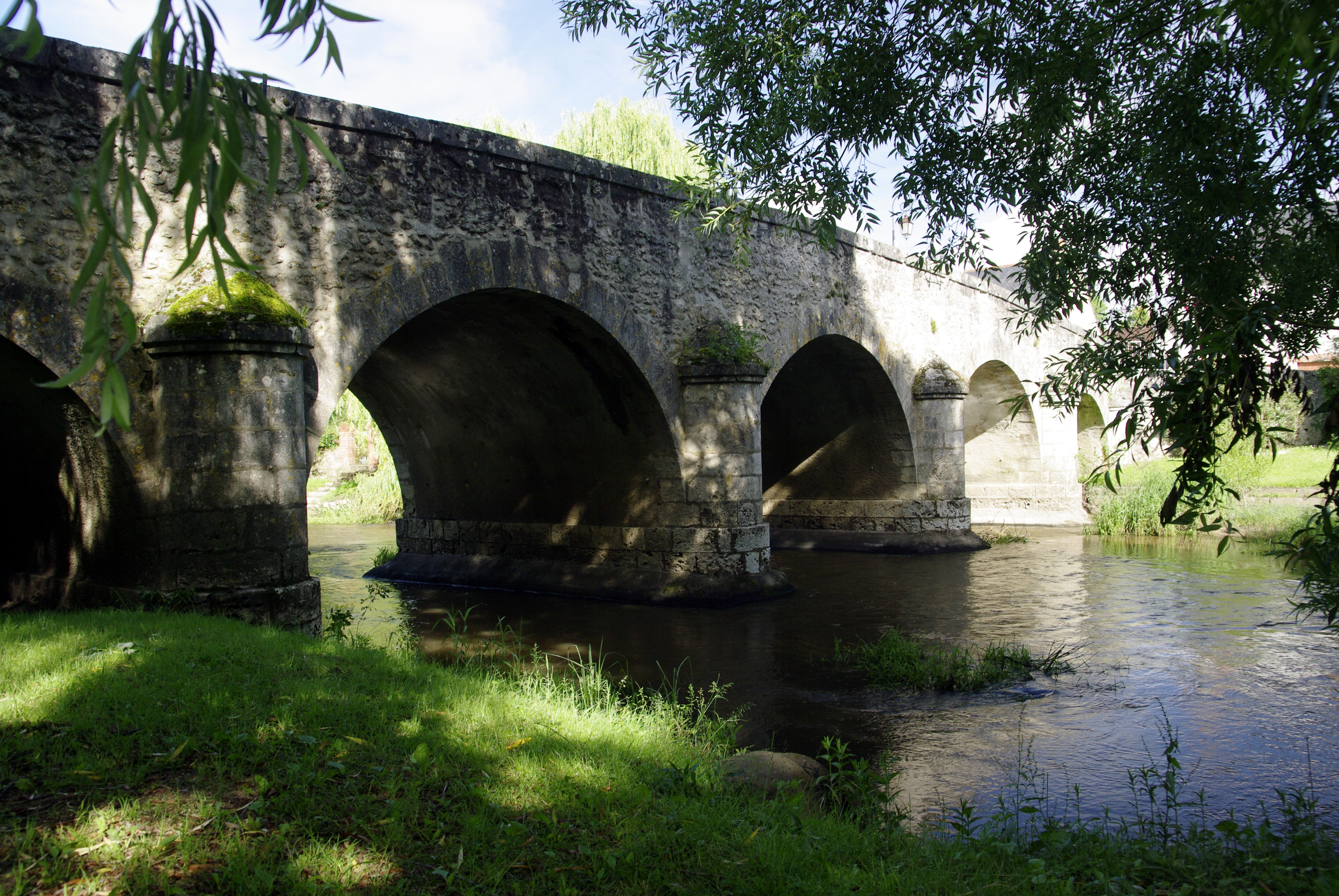
- Bridge over the Cosson

- Coat of arms
- Location of Huisseau-sur-Cosson
- Location within France Location within Centre-Val de Loire
- Coordinates: 47°35′36″N 1°27′13″E
- Country: France
- Region: Centre-Val de Loire
- Department: Loir-et-Cher
- Arrondissement: Blois
- Canton: Chambord

Government
  - Mayor (2020–2026): Joël Debuigne
- Area^{1}: 22.79 km^{2} (8.80 sq mi)
- Elevation: 90 m (300 ft)
- Highest elevation: 97 m (318 ft)
- Lowest elevation: 72 m (236 ft)
- Population (2023): 2,290
  - Density: 100/km^{2} (260/sq mi)
- Time zone: UTC+01:00 (CET)
  - Summer (DST): UTC+02:00 (CEST)
- INSEE/Postal code: 41104 /41350
- ^{1} French Land Register data, which excludes lakes, ponds, glaciers > 1 km^{2} (0.386 sq mi or 247 acres) and river estuaries.

Huisseau-sur-Cosson (French pronunciation: [ɥiso syʁ kɔsɔ̃], literally Huisseau on Cosson) is a commune in the Loir-et-Cher department of central France.

== Population ==
Historical population

| Year | Pop. | ±% p.a. |
|---|---|---|
| 1793 | 1,163 | — |
| 1821 | 1,379 | +0.61% |
| 1846 | 1,545 | +0.46% |
| 1872 | 1,456 | −0.23% |
| 1901 | 1,342 | −0.28% |
| 1926 | 1,090 | −0.83% |
| 1946 | 1,131 | +0.18% |
| 1962 | 1,248 | +0.62% |
| 1968 | 1,202 | −0.62% |

| Year | Pop. | ±% p.a. |
|---|---|---|
| 1975 | 1,286 | +0.97% |
| 1982 | 1,738 | +4.40% |
| 1990 | 1,834 | +0.67% |
| 1999 | 1,906 | +0.43% |
| 2007 | 2,126 | +1.37% |
| 2012 | 2,304 | +1.62% |
| 2017 | 2,281 | −0.20% |
| 2023 | 2,290 | +0.07% |

Source: EHESS and INSEE (1968-2023)

== See also ==
- Communes of the Loir-et-Cher department
