= Bracieux =

- Commune
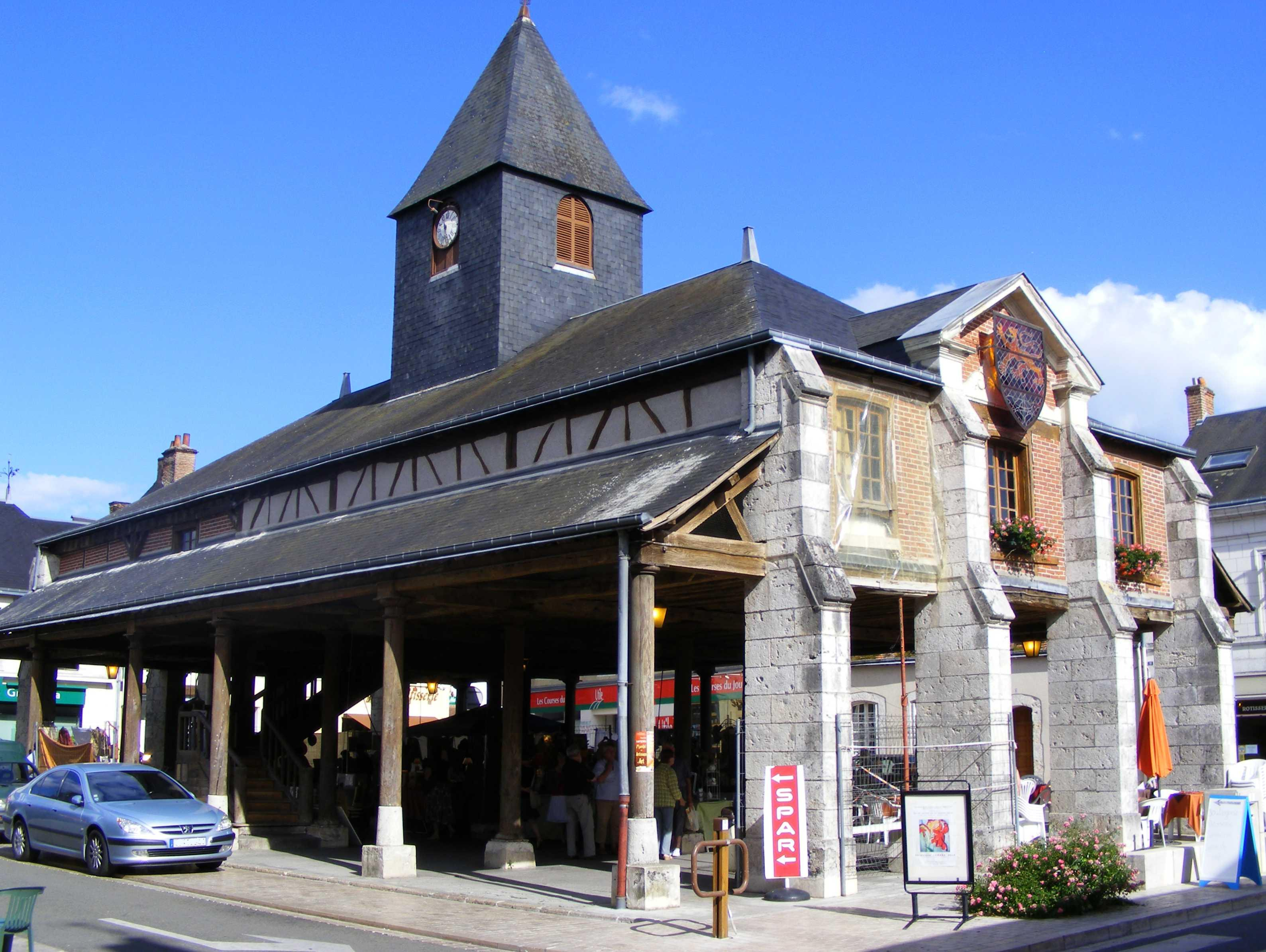
- Covered market

- Coat of arms
- Location of Bracieux
- Location within France Location within Centre-Val de Loire
- Coordinates: 47°32′58″N 1°32′33″E
- Country: France
- Region: Centre-Val de Loire
- Department: Loir-et-Cher
- Arrondissement: Blois
- Canton: Chambord
- Intercommunality: Grand Chambord

Government
  - Mayor (2020–2026): Hélène Pailloux
- Area^{1}: 2.95 km^{2} (1.14 sq mi)
- Elevation: 80 m (260 ft)
- Highest elevation: 89 m (292 ft)
- Lowest elevation: 74 m (243 ft)
- Population (2023): 1,343
  - Density: 455/km^{2} (1,180/sq mi)
- Demonym: Bracilien.ne
- Time zone: UTC+01:00 (CET)
  - Summer (DST): UTC+02:00 (CEST)
- INSEE/Postal code: 41025 /41250
- ^{1} French Land Register data, which excludes lakes, ponds, glaciers > 1 km^{2} (0.386 sq mi or 247 acres) and river estuaries.

Bracieux (pronounced [bʁasjø]) is a French commune in the department of Loir-et-Cher, Centre-Val de Loire.

It is located about 20 km (12 mi) from Blois, and about 10 km (6.2 mi) from Chambord. The Max Vauché's chocolate factory was established in the commune, in 2005.

== Population ==
Historical population
Year	Pop.	±% p.a.
1968	829	—
1975	1,011	+2.88%
1982	1,142	+1.76%
1990	1,157	+0.16%
1999	1,158	+0.01%
2007	1,267	+1.13%
2012	1,259	−0.13%
2017	1,305	+0.72%
2023	1,343	+0.48%
Source: INSEE

== See also ==
- Communes of the Loir-et-Cher department
