= Château de Villesavin =

16th-century country house in Centre-Val de Loire, France

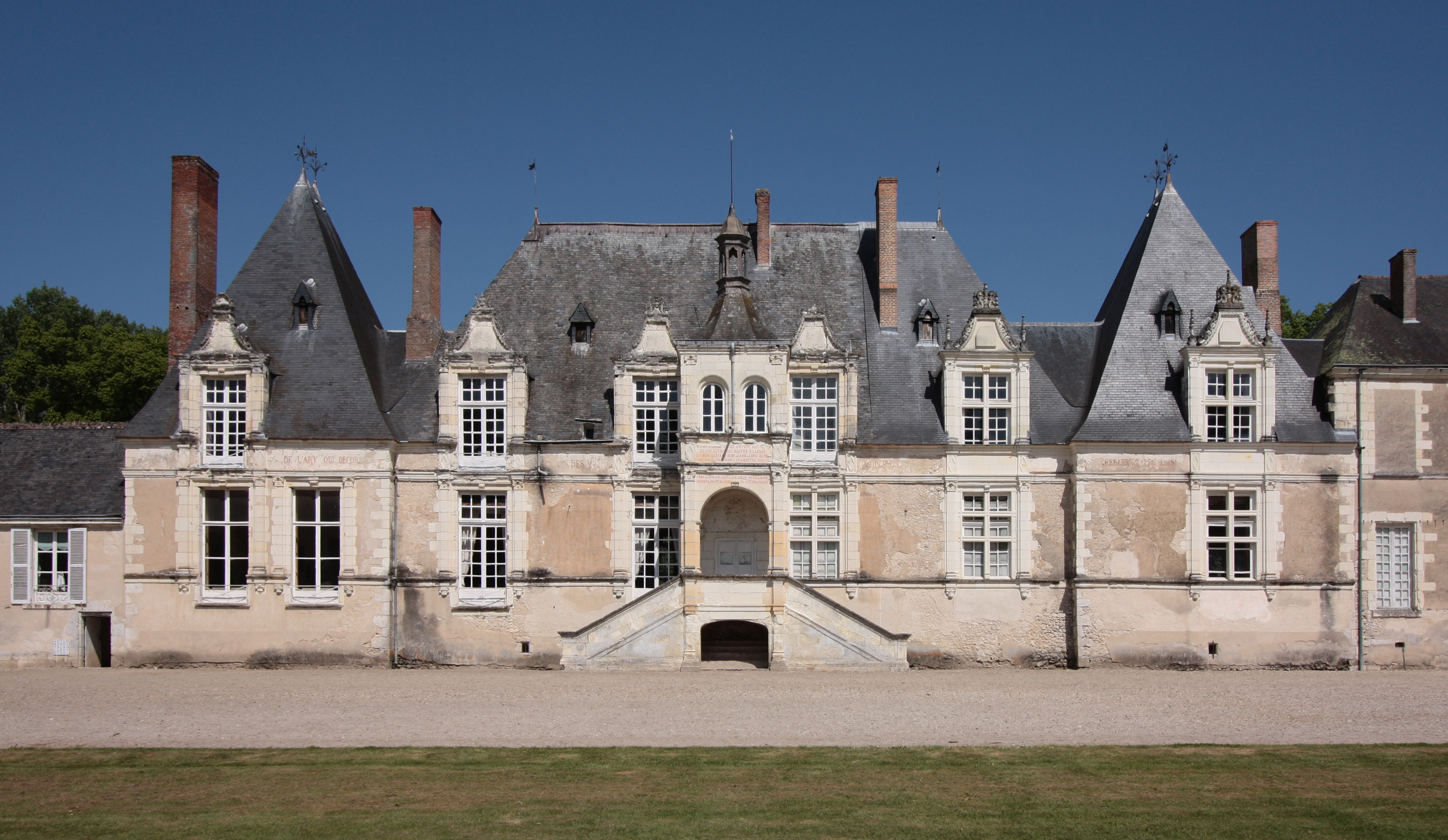

- Location within France

General information
- Architectural style: French Renaissance
- Location: Tour-en-Sologne, Loir-et-Cher, France
- Coordinates: 47.546517°N 1.514403°E
- Construction started: 1527
- Completed: 1537
- Client: Jean le Breton, Sieur de Villandry

Design and construction
- Architect: Domenico da Cortona
- Structural engineer: Pierre Nepveu

Website
- chateau-de-villesavin.fr

Monument historique
- Designated: 10 May 1928
- Reference no.: PA00098621

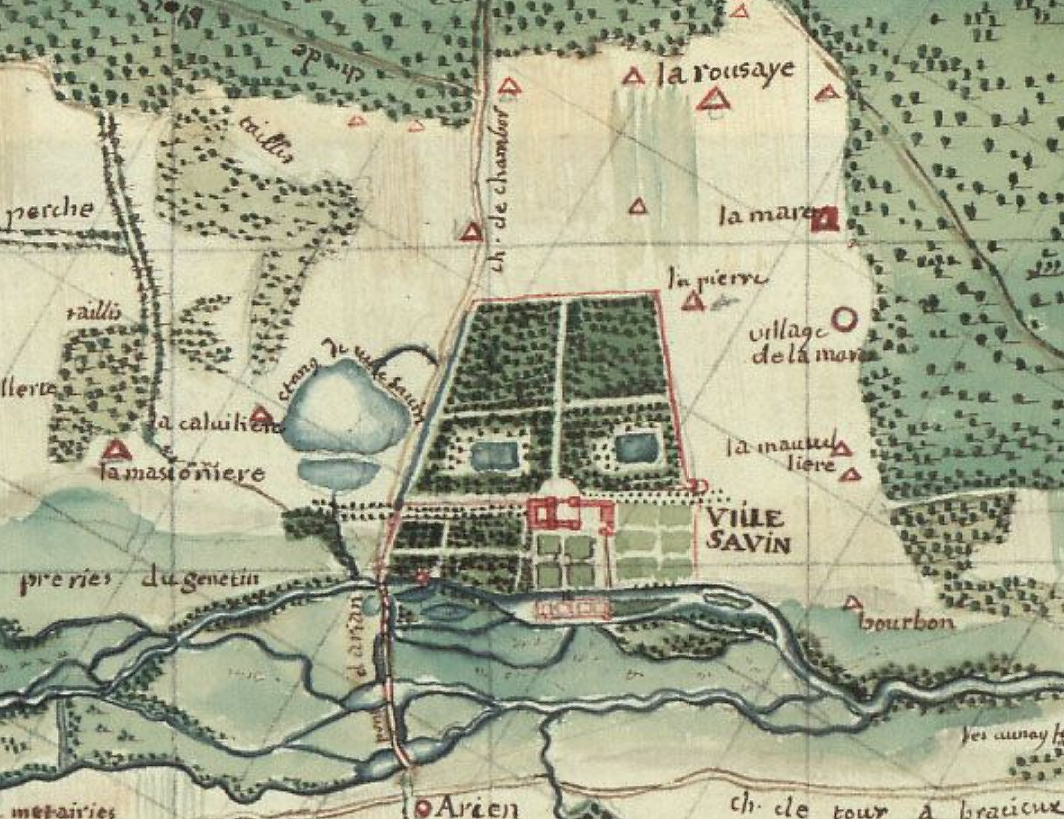
Map of Villesavin, prior to 1731

Château de Villesavin (French pronunciation: [ʃɑto də vilsavɛ̃]) is a 16th-century country house in the Tour-en-Sologne commune in Loir-et-Cher, Centre-Val de Loire, France. The château is a designated historical monument of France. It is privately owned and contains several museums open to the public.

== History and features ==
Château Villesavin is built on the Beuvron, on what was once a Roman Gaulic settlement called Villa Savinus. A medieval manor was later built on the site, and owned by Guy de Châtillon, Count of Blois, in the early 14th century.

The present château was built by Jean le Breton, Lord of Villandry, who was the financial secretary under King François I. The château was designed by the French renaissance style by the same Italian and French masters who built Château de Chambord, 9 kilometres (5.6 mi) away, including Benvenuto Cellini. Le Breton supervised the construction of Chambord on behalf of the king, and decided to build his own home nearby using the same materials and designers, and possibly some of the same budget. The château was constructed between 1527 and 1537, during which time le Breton also built his other home, Château de Villandry.

The château consists of a main horseshoe shaped house, with dormers framed by volutes and pilasters, decorated with the royal emblem of François I. In the rear is a moat and small bridge. The spiral staircase inside appears to have been inspired by Chambord, while stained-glass windows contain scenes from Metamorphoses by the poet Ovid.

On either side of the main house are two single-story horseshoe-shaped wings, each with rectangular corner pavilions and courtyards. Le Breton skipped the round towers of châteaux like Chambord to install more innovative square corner pavilions, which had just come into fashion in France. The left pavilion contains a chapel, which includes late 16th-century murals depicting the Passion of the Christ in the style of the Second School of Fontainebleau.

In the central courtyard is an Italian marble fountain decorated with chimeras, lion masks, and dolphins.

The grounds also contain a very large and rare dovecote with 1,500 holes. The 16th-century dovecote is one of the few that survived the French Revolution, as owning doves was a royal privilege and status symbol of the nobility. To the peasantry, however, the birds were seen as pests, as they would descend on the fields and eat seeds and crops, but the peasants were forbidden from shooting them. Nearly all the dovecotes were destroyed during the revolution.

== Château today ==
The château had been abandoned when it was purchased by the Count and Countess de Sparre in 1937. It has been open to the public since 1954. The estate hosts weddings every weekend from April to November. In 2000, owners Lars and Véronique de Sparre, the present Count and Countess, opened a museum dedicated to weddings, with artifacts dating to 1840.

== Gallery ==
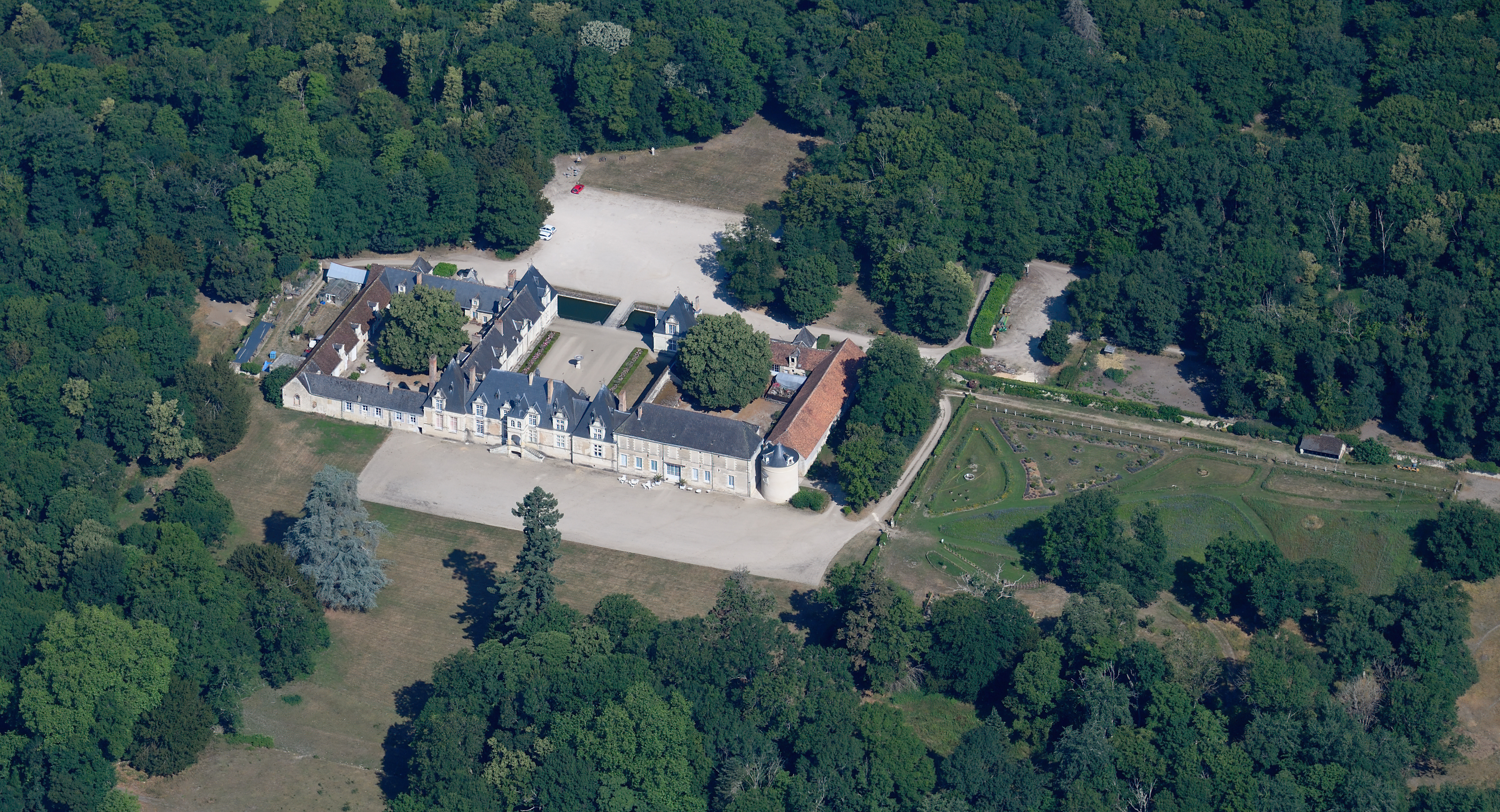
Aerial view of the château

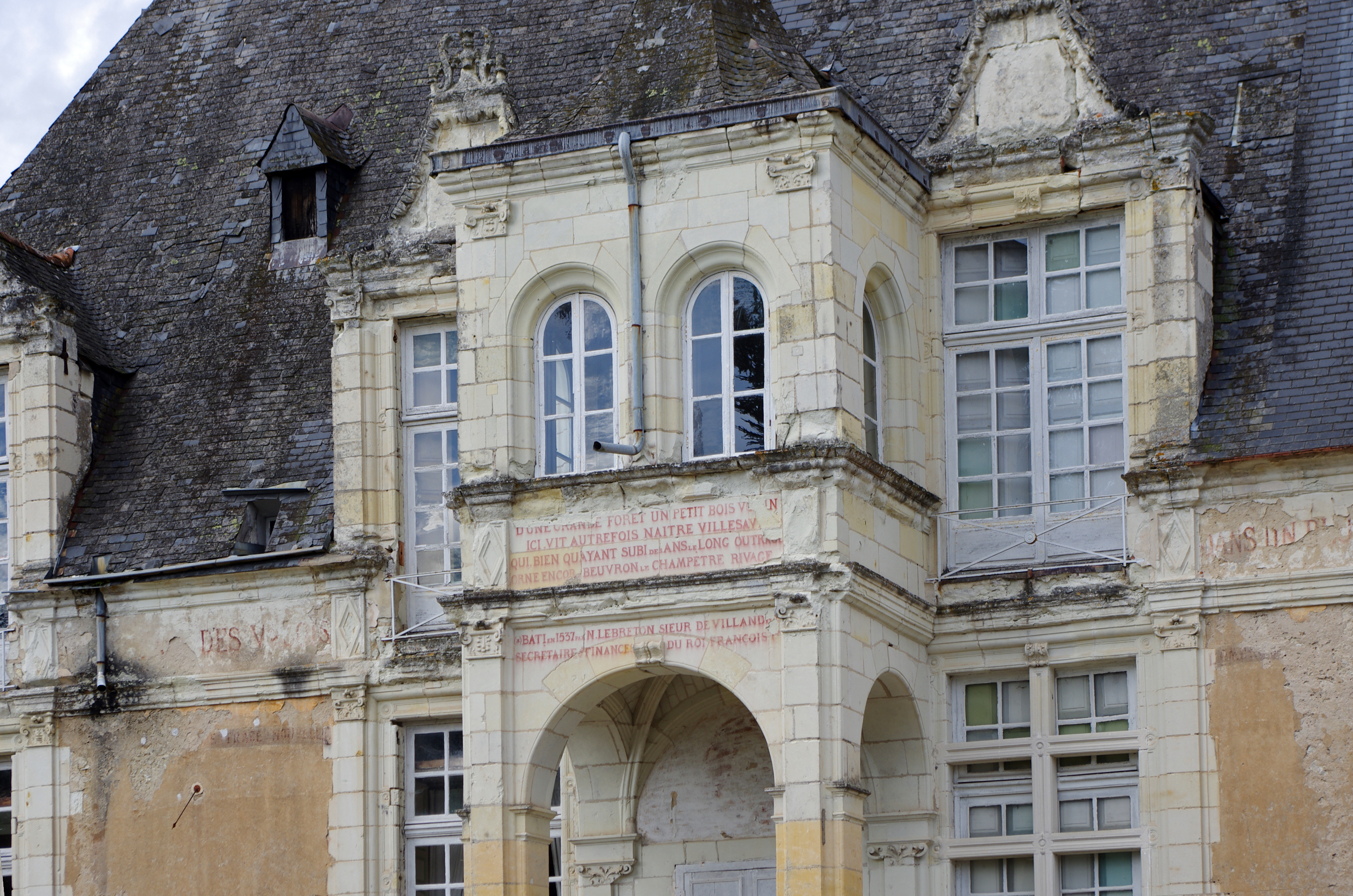
Inscription with name of Jean le Breton and completion date of 1537

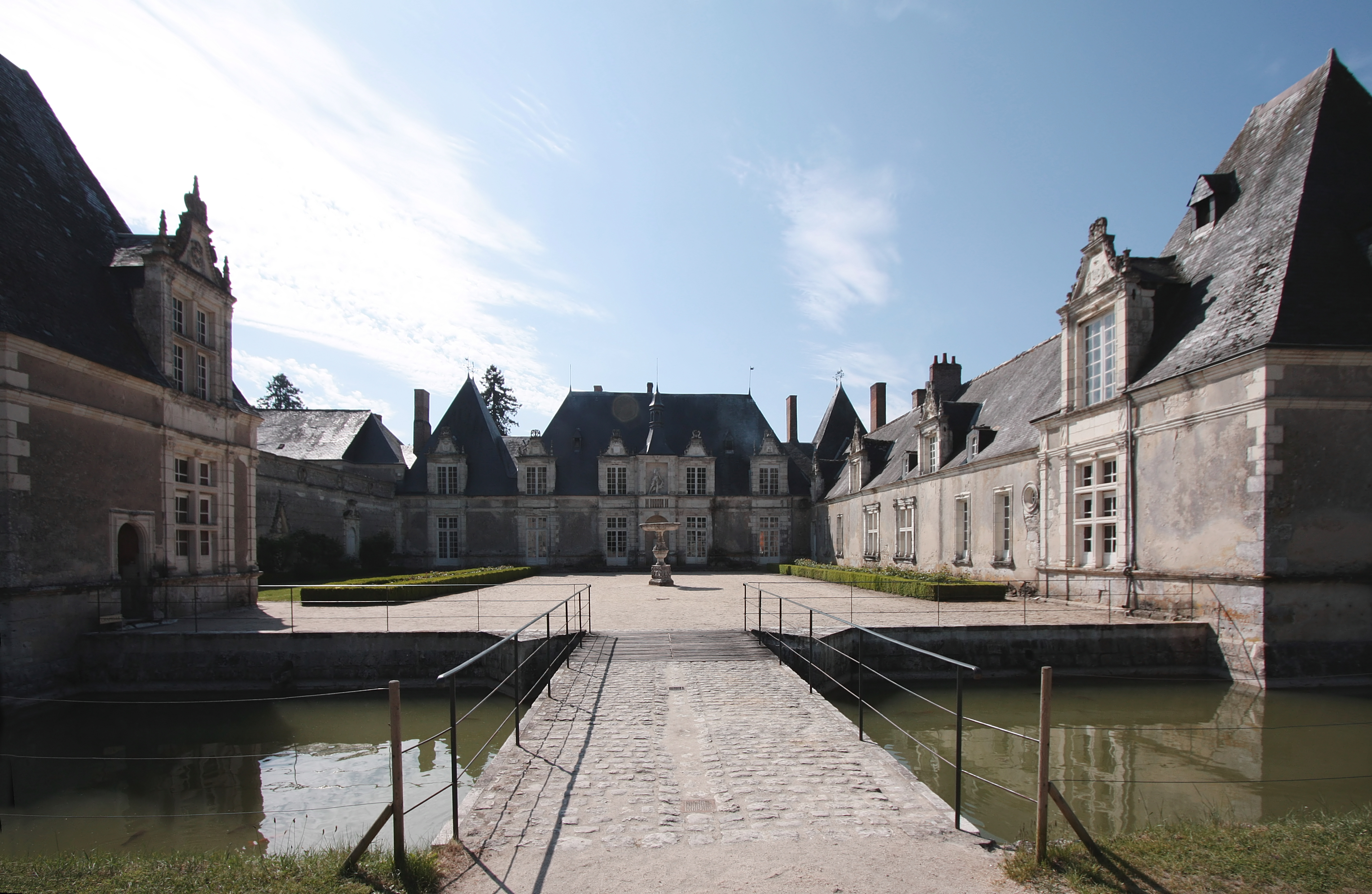
Château from the rear

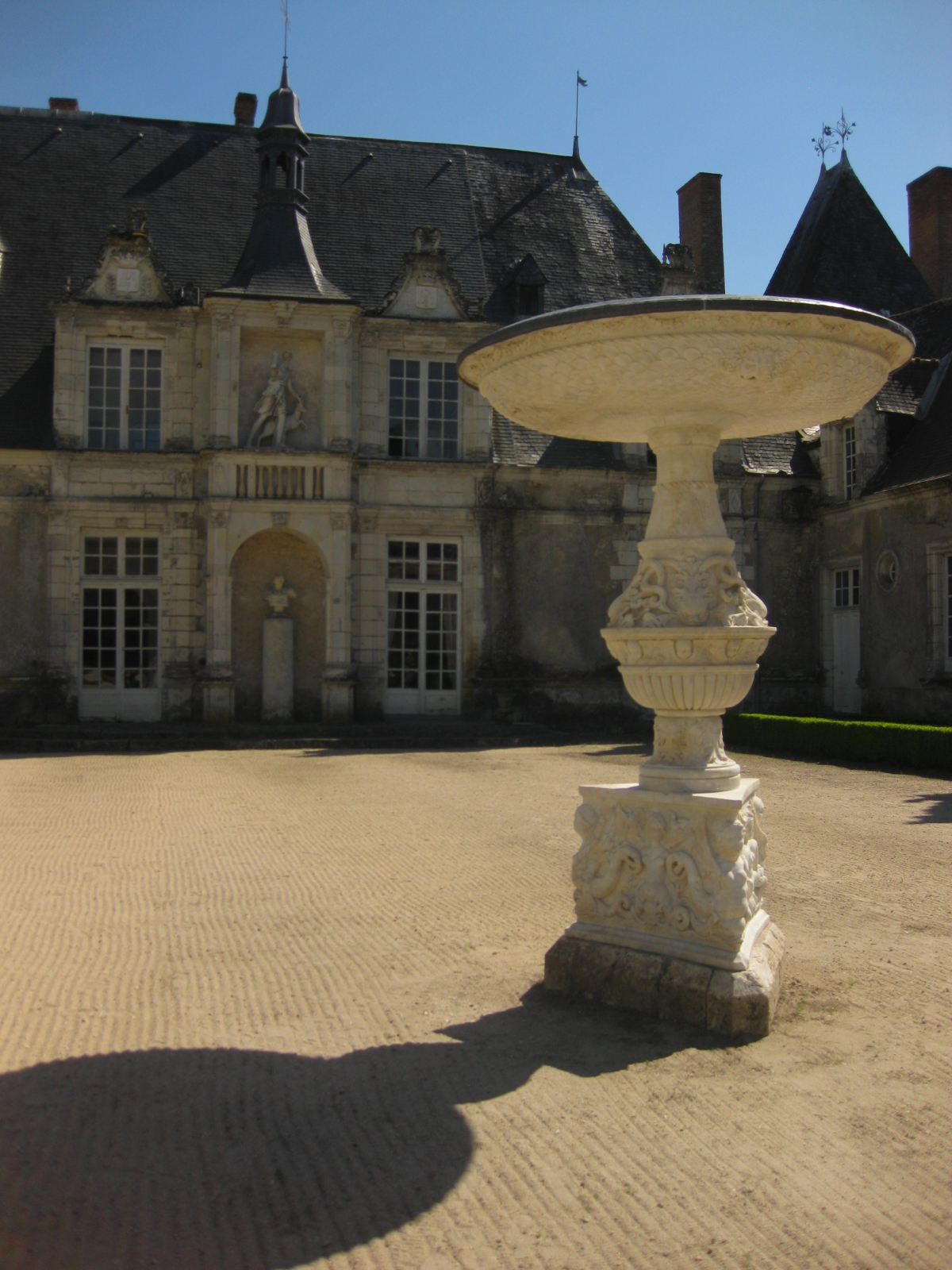
Italian marble statue

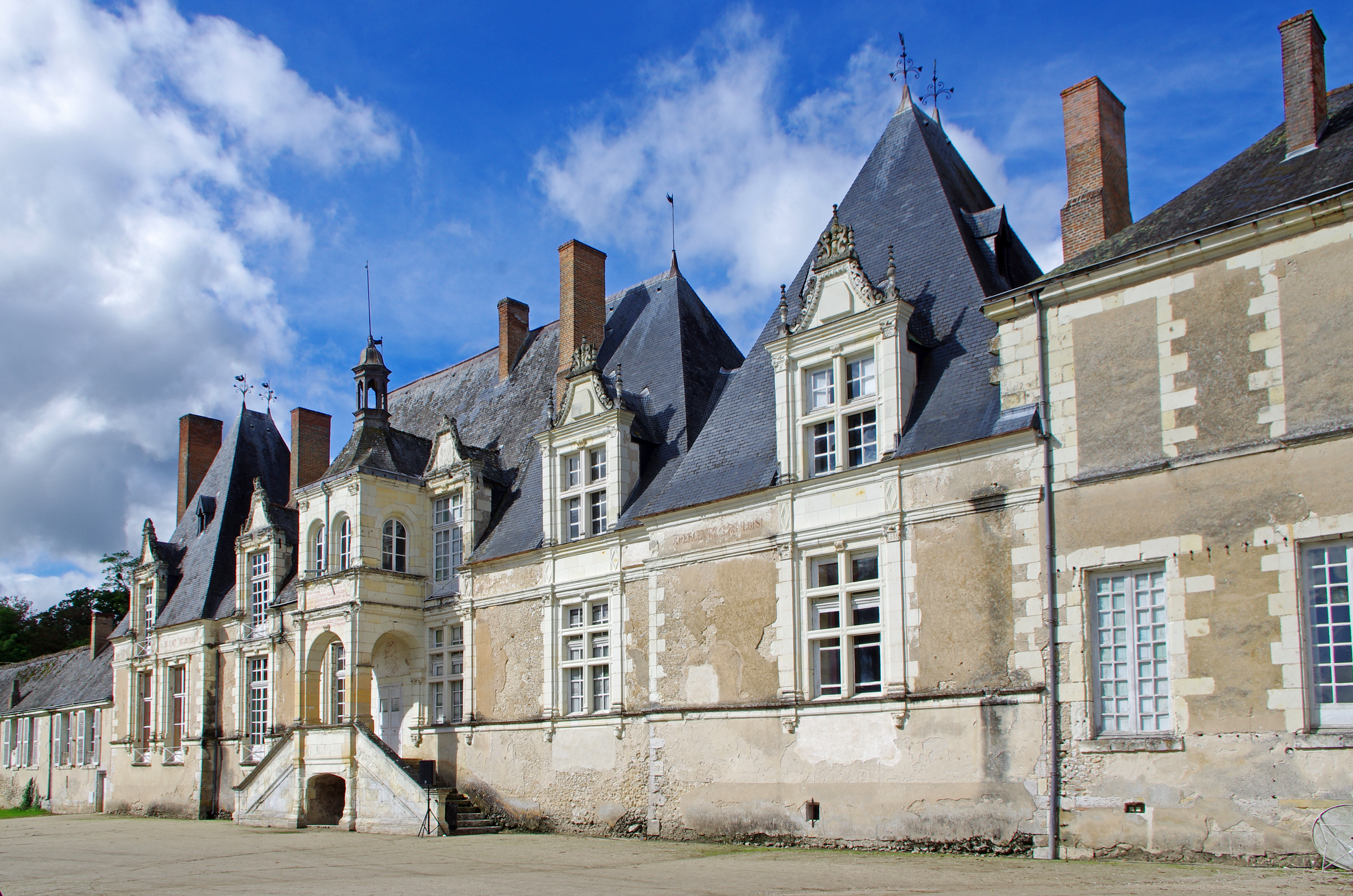
Front of château

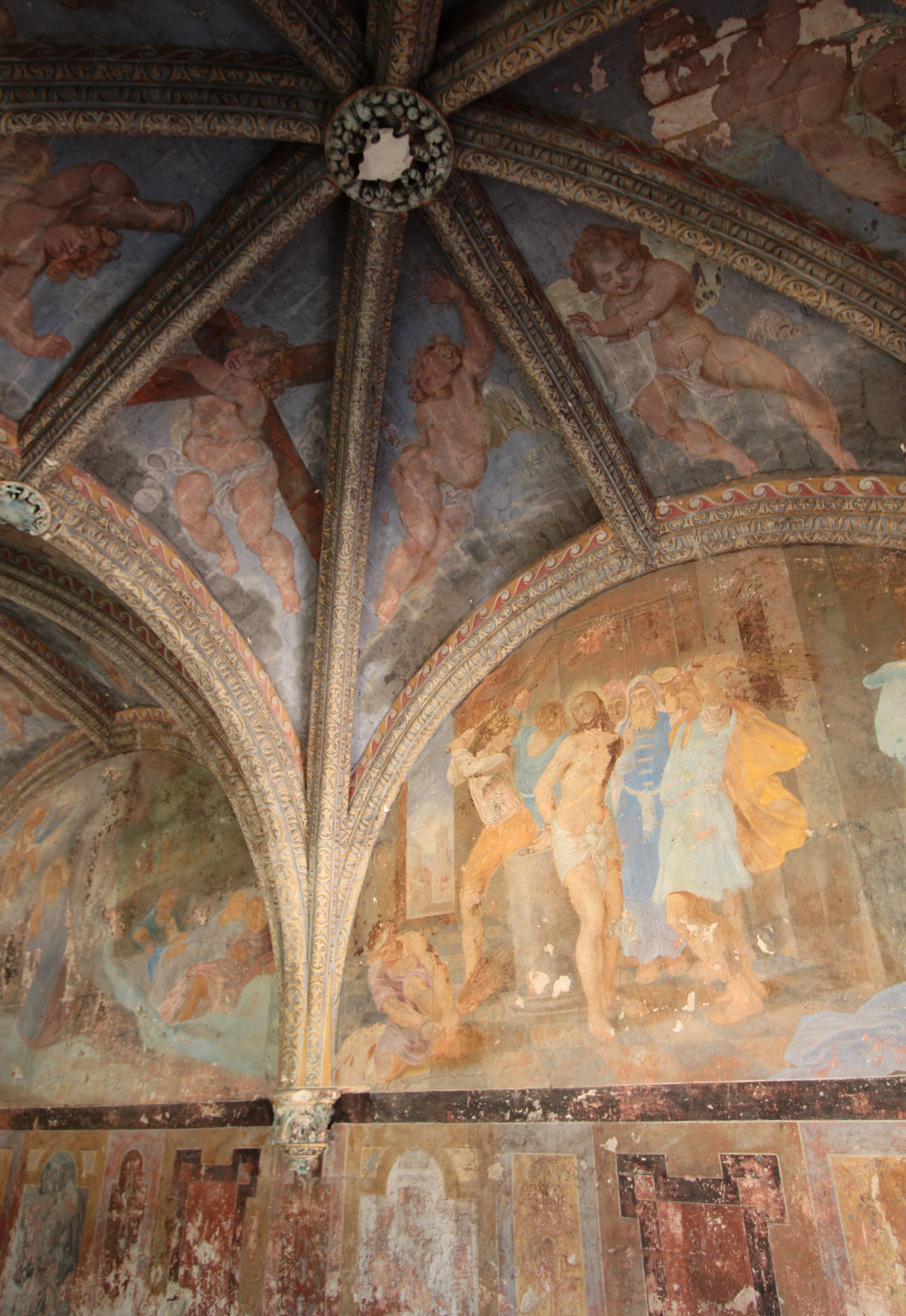
Frescoes in the chapel

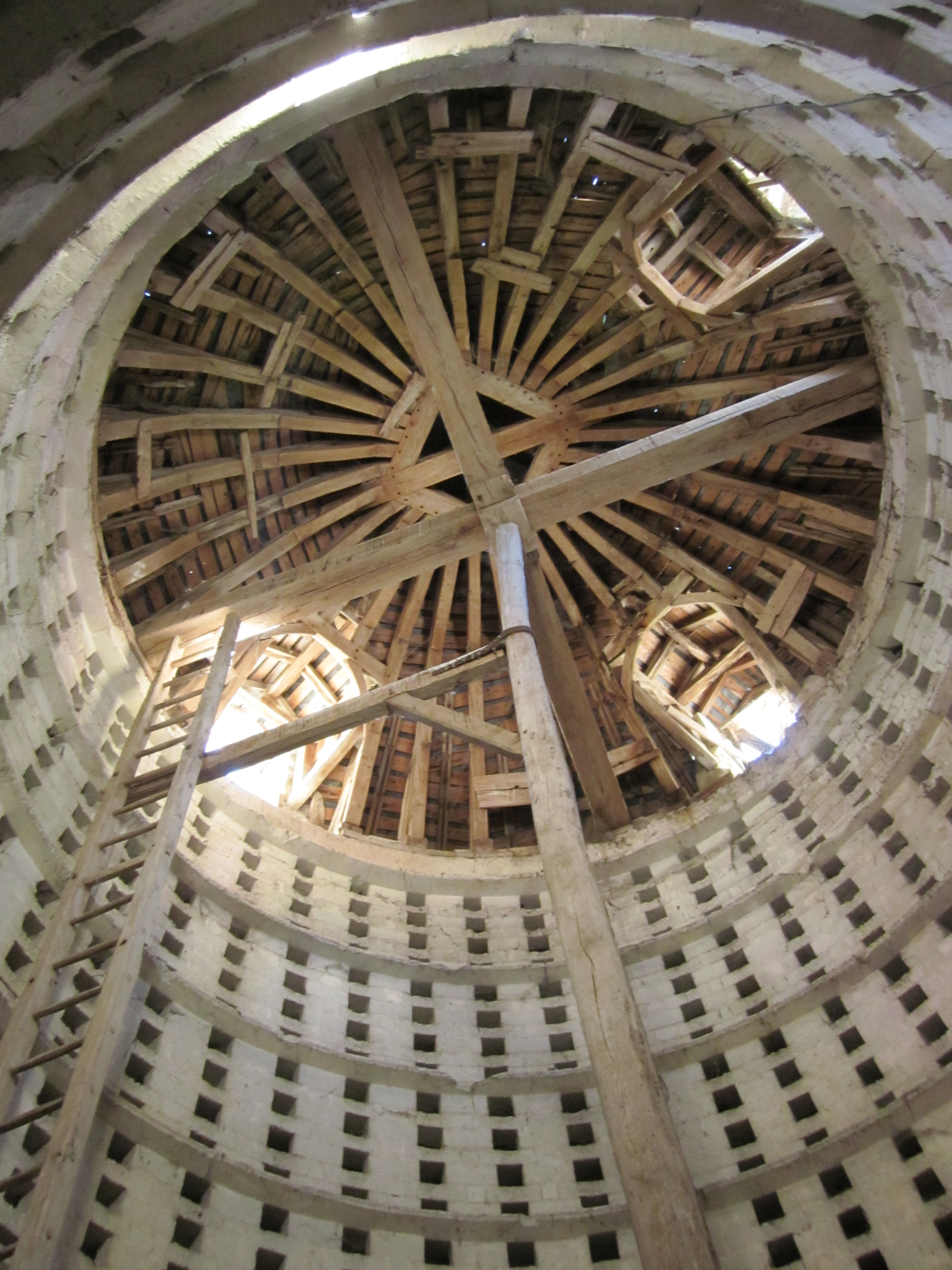
Dovecote

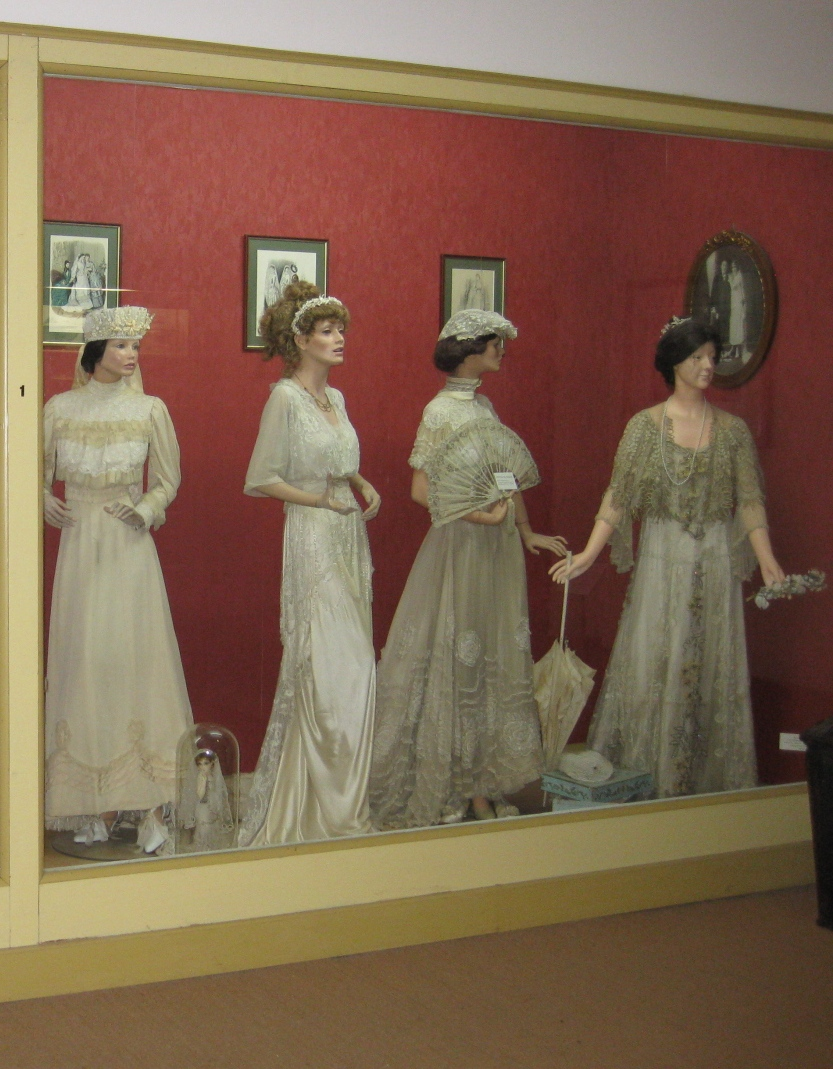
Wedding dresses in the marriage museum

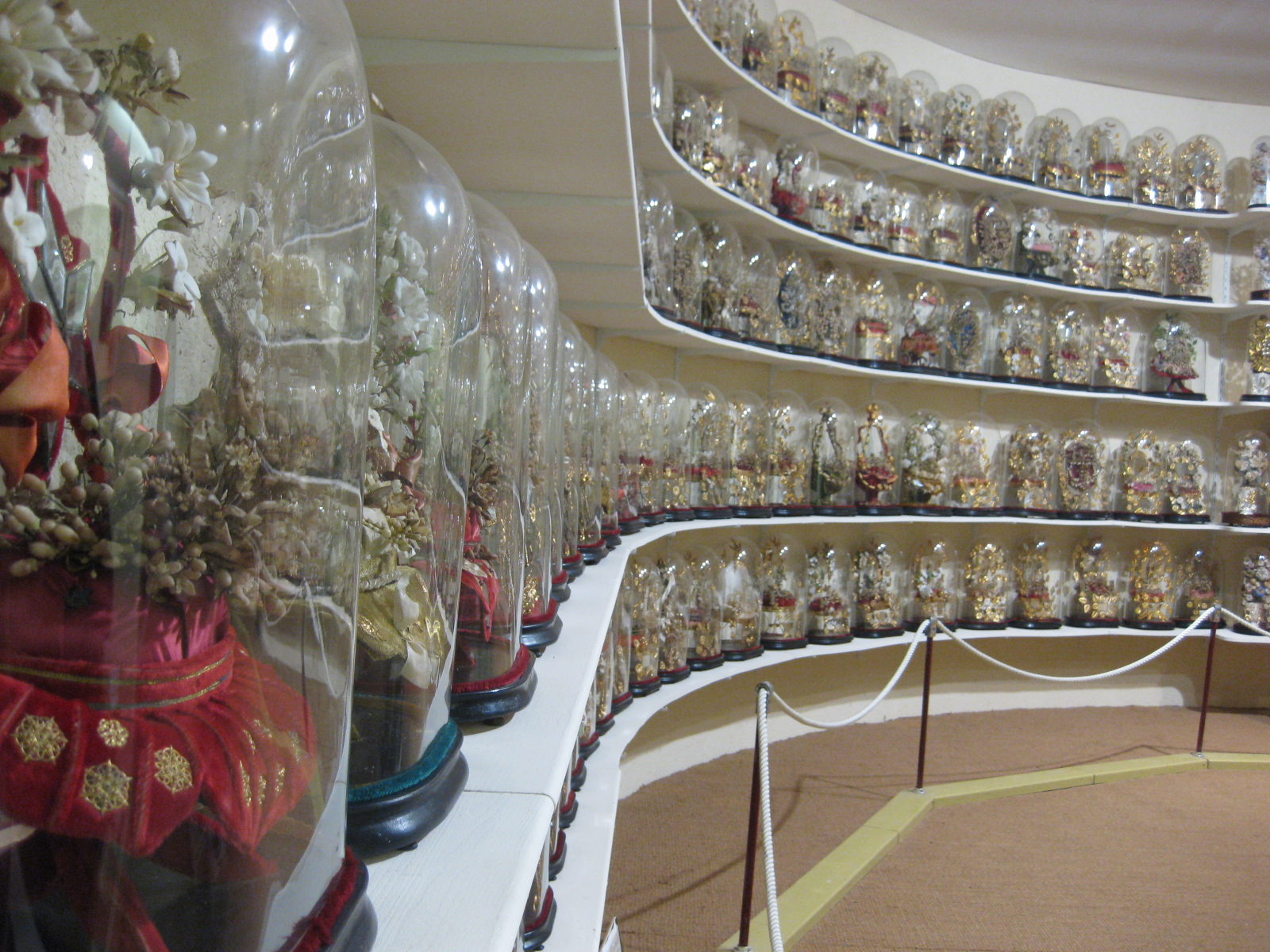
Wedding crowns

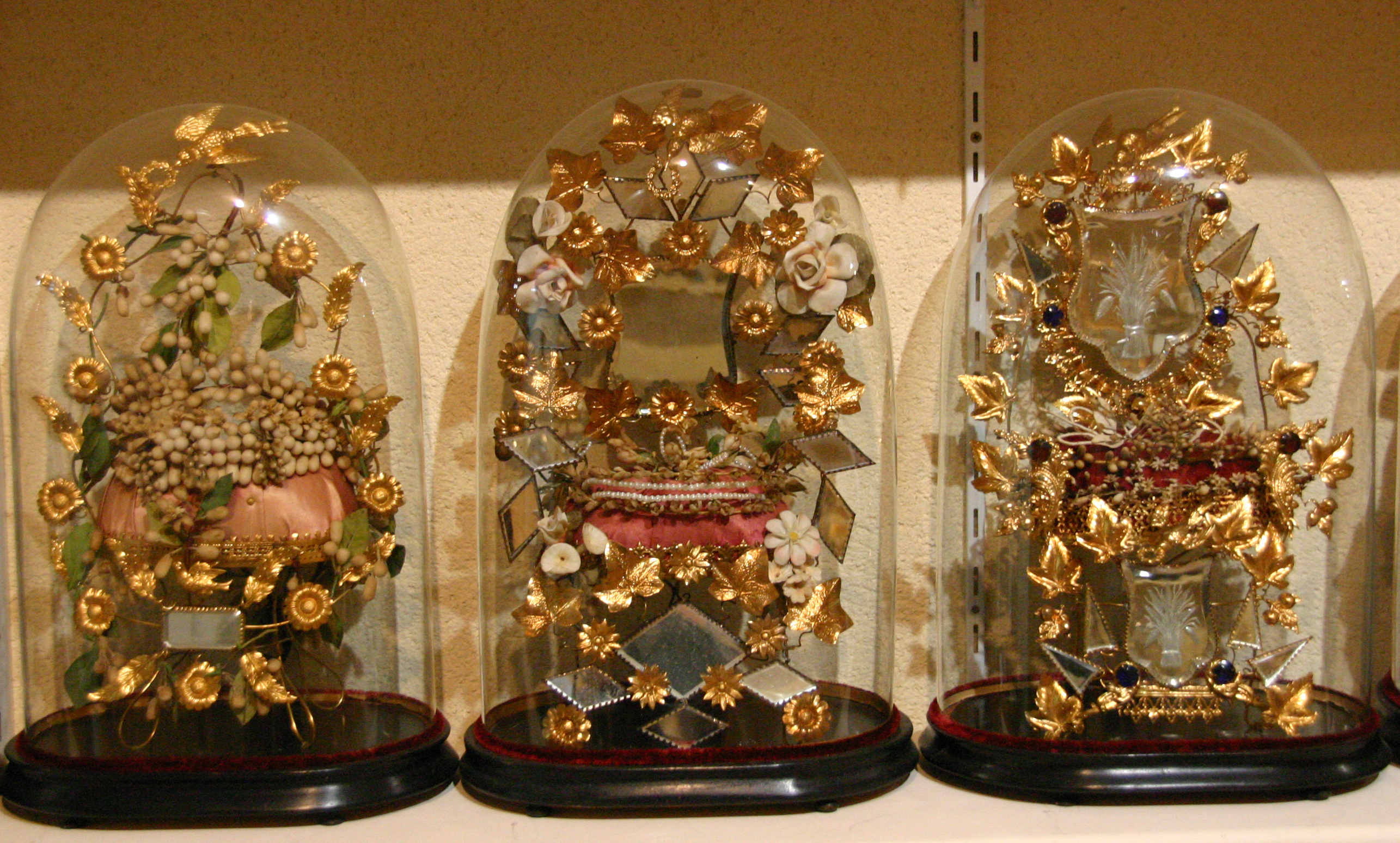
Wedding crowns
