= Villeny =

- Commune
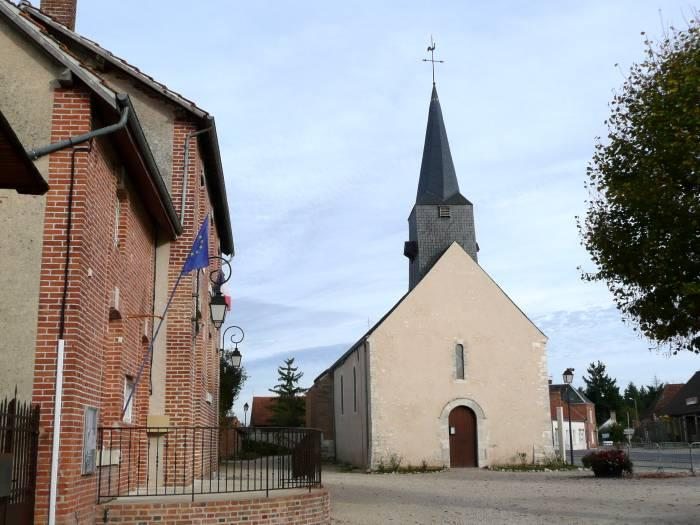
- Town hall and church
- Location of Villeny
- Location within France Location within Centre-Val de Loire
- Coordinates: 47°37′25″N 1°45′20″E
- Country: France
- Region: Centre-Val de Loire
- Department: Loir-et-Cher
- Arrondissement: Romorantin-Lanthenay
- Canton: Chambord
- Intercommunality: Sologne des étangs

Government
  - Mayor (2020–2026): Hubert Chevallier
- Area^{1}: 33.98 km^{2} (13.12 sq mi)
- Elevation: 130 m (430 ft)
- Highest elevation: 136 m (446 ft)
- Lowest elevation: 93 m (305 ft)
- Population (2023): 487
  - Density: 14.3/km^{2} (37.1/sq mi)
- Time zone: UTC+01:00 (CET)
  - Summer (DST): UTC+02:00 (CEST)
- INSEE/Postal code: 41285 /41220
- ^{1} French Land Register data, which excludes lakes, ponds, glaciers > 1 km^{2} (0.386 sq mi or 247 acres) and river estuaries.

Villeny (French pronunciation: [vilni]) is a commune in the Loir-et-Cher department in central France.

== Population ==
Historical population
Year	Pop.	±% p.a.
1968	461	—
1975	381	−2.69%
1982	336	−1.78%
1990	324	−0.45%
1999	334	+0.34%
2007	369	+1.25%
2012	432	+3.20%
2017	493	+2.68%
2023	487	−0.20%
Source: INSEE

== See also ==
- Communes of the Loir-et-Cher department
