= Vannes-sur-Cosson =

- Commune
- Coat of arms
- Location of Vannes-sur-Cosson
- Location within France Location within Centre-Val de Loire
- Coordinates: 47°42′50″N 2°12′46″E
- Country: France
- Region: Centre-Val de Loire
- Department: Loiret
- Arrondissement: Orléans
- Canton: Saint-Jean-le-Blanc
- Intercommunality: Val de Sully

Government
  - Mayor (2021–2026): Eric Hauer
- Area^{1}: 35.65 km^{2} (13.76 sq mi)
- Highest elevation: 148 m (486 ft)
- Lowest elevation: 119 m (390 ft)
- Population (2023): 592
  - Density: 16.6/km^{2} (43.0/sq mi)
- Time zone: UTC+01:00 (CET)
  - Summer (DST): UTC+02:00 (CEST)
- INSEE/Postal code: 45331 /45510
- ^{1} French Land Register data, which excludes lakes, ponds, glaciers > 1 km^{2} (0.386 sq mi or 247 acres) and river estuaries.

Vannes-sur-Cosson (French pronunciation: [van syʁ kɔsɔ̃], literally Vannes on Cosson) is a commune in the Loiret department in north-central France.

== Geography ==
The river Cosson has its source in the commune.

== See also ==
- Communes of the Loiret department
