= Cosson =

River in France

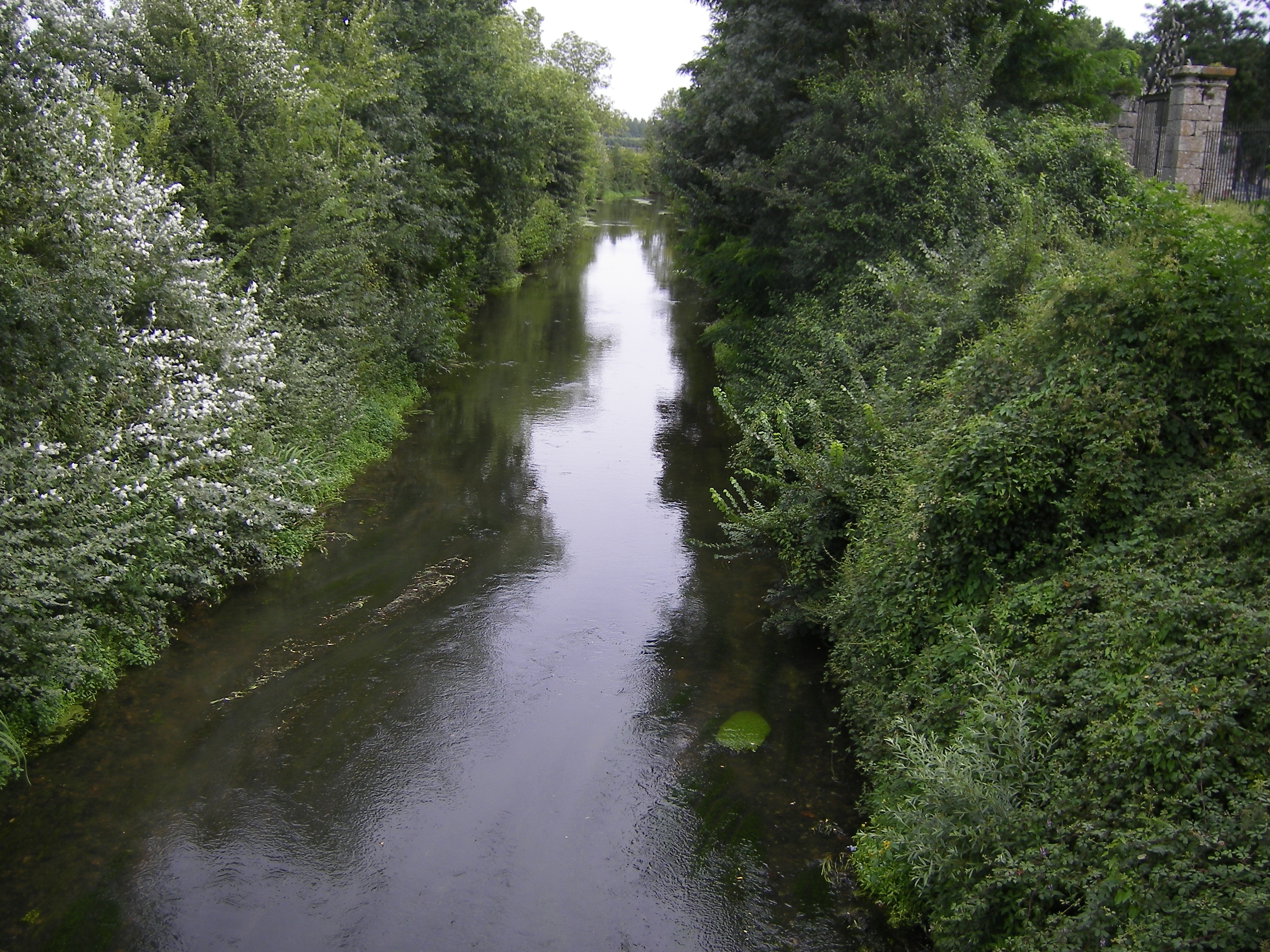
- The Cosson at Candé-sur-Beuvron

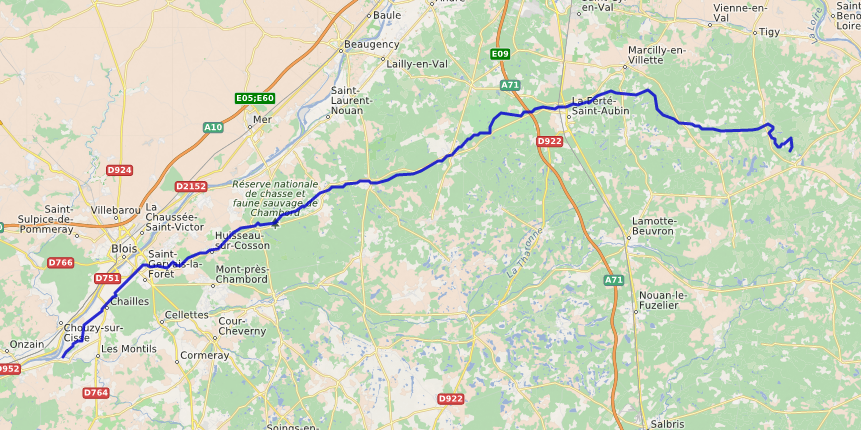

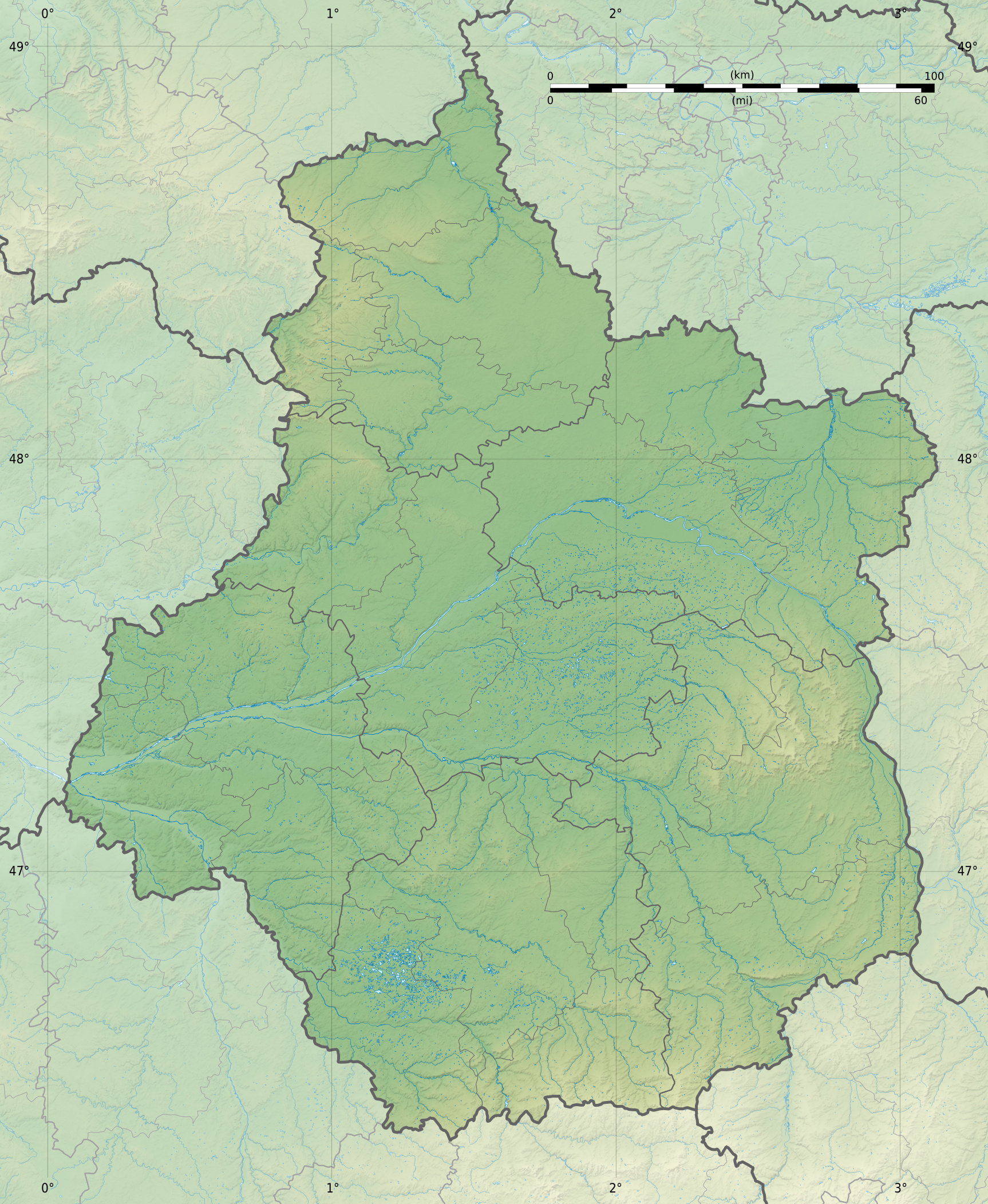
- Location within France Location within Centre-Val de Loire

Location
- Country: France

Physical characteristics
- Source
  - location: Sologne
  - coordinates: 47°41′50″N 02°14′58″W
  - elevation: 134 m (440 ft)
- Mouth
  - location: Beuvron
  - coordinates: 47°29′41″N 1°15′3″E
  - elevation: 64 m (210 ft)
- Length: 96.4 km (59.9 mi)

Basin features
- Progression: Beuvron→ Loire→ Atlantic Ocean

The Cosson (French pronunciation: [kɔsɔ̃]) is a 96.4-kilometre (59.9 mi) long river in central France, a right tributary of the river Beuvron. Its source is near the village of Vannes-sur-Cosson, Sologne. The Cosson flows through the following departments and communes:

- Loiret: La Ferté-Saint-Aubin, La Ferté-Saint-Cyr
- Loir-et-Cher: Vineuil, Candé-sur-Beuvron

The château de Chambord is built in one curve of the Cosson. The Cosson flows into the river Beuvron in Candé-sur-Beuvron, less than 1 kilometre (0.6 mi) from its confluence with the Loire.
