= Maslives =

- Commune
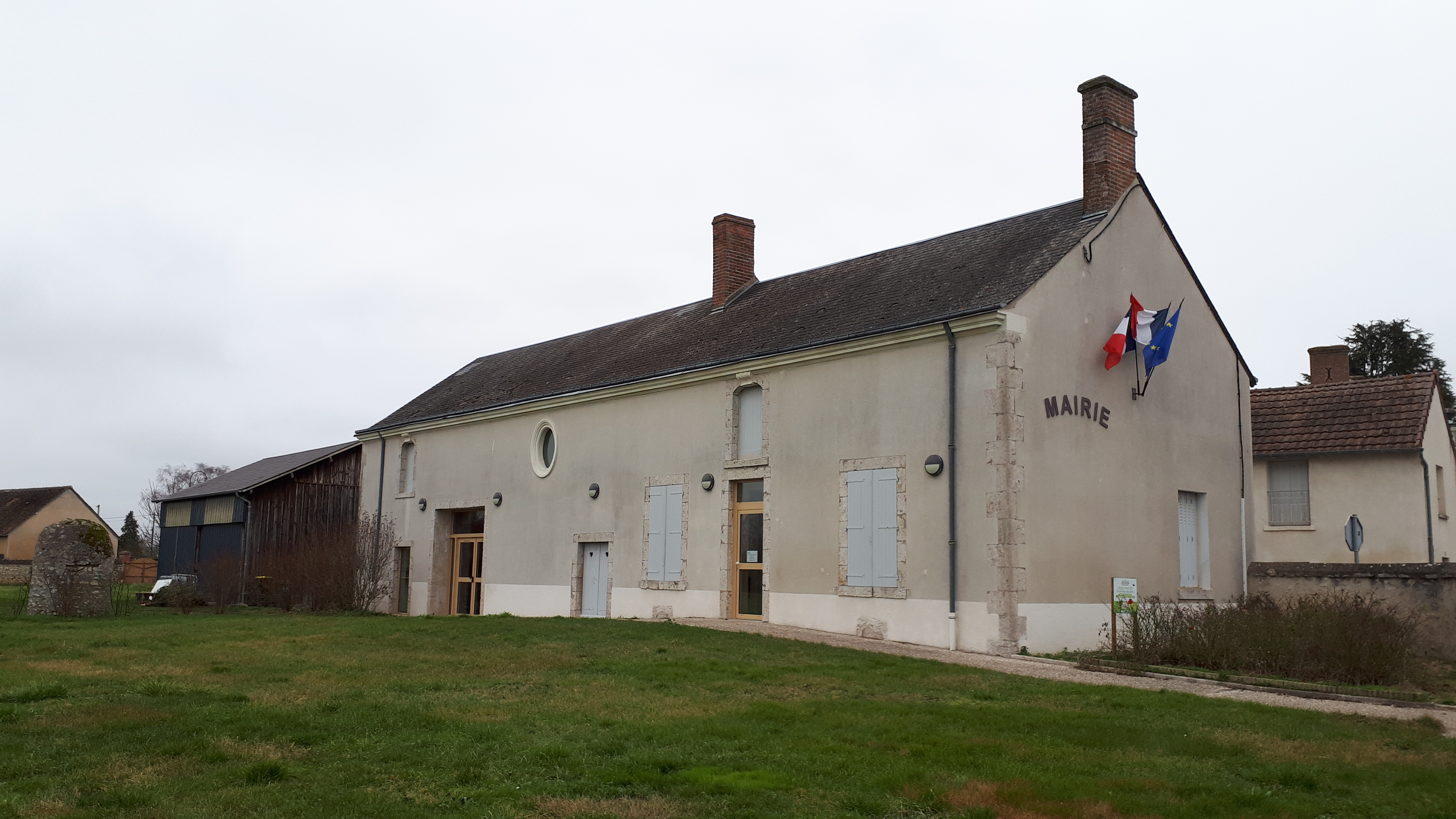
- Town hall of Maslives

- Coat of arms
- Location of Maslives
- Location within France Location within Centre-Val de Loire
- Coordinates: 47°37′57″N 1°28′53″E
- Country: France
- Region: Centre-Val de Loire
- Department: Loir-et-Cher
- Arrondissement: Blois
- Canton: Chambord

Government
  - Mayor (2022–2026): Christine Mongella
- Area^{1}: 7.35 km^{2} (2.84 sq mi)
- Elevation: 92 m (302 ft)
- Highest elevation: 99 m (325 ft)
- Lowest elevation: 72 m (236 ft)
- Population (2023): 649
  - Density: 88.3/km^{2} (229/sq mi)
- Demonym(s): Maslivois, Maslivoise
- Time zone: UTC+01:00 (CET)
  - Summer (DST): UTC+02:00 (CEST)
- INSEE/Postal code: 41129 /41250
- ^{1} French Land Register data, which excludes lakes, ponds, glaciers > 1 km^{2} (0.386 sq mi or 247 acres) and river estuaries.

Maslives (French pronunciation: [maliv]) is a commune in the department of Loir-et-Cher, in the region of Centre-Val de Loire, France.

== Population ==
Historical population
Year	Pop.	±% p.a.
1968	277	—
1975	319	+2.04%
1982	506	+6.81%
1990	581	+1.74%
1999	580	−0.02%
2007	638	+1.20%
2012	736	+2.90%
2017	702	−0.94%
2023	649	−1.30%
Source: INSEE

== See also ==
- Communes of the Loir-et-Cher department
