= Departmental Council of Loir-et-Cher =

Departmental legislature in France

Departmental Council of Loir-et-Cher Conseil départemental de Loir-et-Cher

Leadership
- President: Philippe Gouet, UDI since 1 July 2021

Structure
- Seats: 30
- Political groups: Government (16): UDI (7); DVD (4); LR (3); DVG (2); Opposition (14): DVG (6); DVD (3); MoDem (2); G.s (1); LÉ (1); LR (1); www.departement41.fr

The Departmental Council of Loir-et-Cher (French: Conseil Départemental de Loir-et-Cher) is the deliberative assembly of the Loir-et-Cher department in the region of Centre-Val de Loire, France. It consists of 30 members (general councilors) from 15 cantons and its headquarters are in Blois.

The president of the general council is Philippe Gouet.

== See also ==
- Loir-et-Cher
- General councils of France
