= Saint-Claude-de-Diray =

- Commune
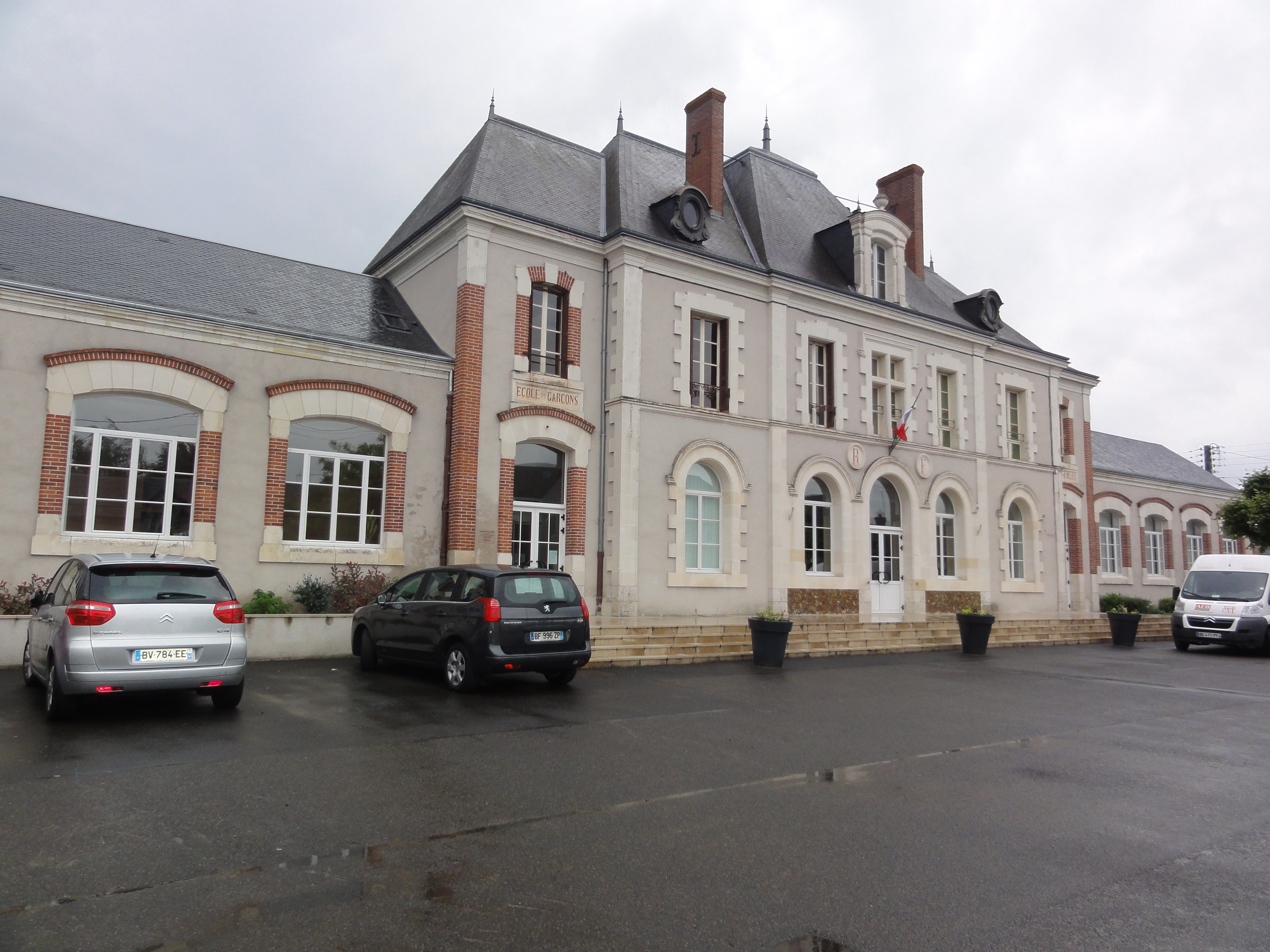
- Town hall and school

- Coat of arms
- Location of Saint-Claude-de-Diray
- Location within France Location within Centre-Val de Loire
- Coordinates: 47°36′56″N 1°25′00″E
- Country: France
- Region: Centre-Val de Loire
- Department: Loir-et-Cher
- Arrondissement: Blois
- Canton: Chambord

Government
  - Mayor (2020–2026): Laurent Allanic
- Area^{1}: 9.17 km^{2} (3.54 sq mi)
- Elevation: 84 m (276 ft)
- Highest elevation: 94 m (308 ft)
- Lowest elevation: 67 m (220 ft)
- Population (2023): 1,764
  - Density: 192/km^{2} (498/sq mi)
- Time zone: UTC+01:00 (CET)
  - Summer (DST): UTC+02:00 (CEST)
- INSEE/Postal code: 41204 /41350
- ^{1} French Land Register data, which excludes lakes, ponds, glaciers > 1 km^{2} (0.386 sq mi or 247 acres) and river estuaries.

Saint-Claude-de-Diray (French pronunciation: [sɛ̃ klod də diʁɛ]) is a commune in the department of Loir-et-Cher, central France.

== Population ==
Historical population
Year	Pop.	±% p.a.
1968	976	—
1975	1,019	+0.62%
1982	1,251	+2.97%
1990	1,435	+1.73%
1999	1,562	+0.95%
2007	1,666	+0.81%
2012	1,708	+0.50%
2017	1,783	+0.86%
2023	1,764	−0.18%
Source: INSEE

== See also ==
- Communes of the Loir-et-Cher department
