= La Ferté-Saint-Cyr =

- Commune
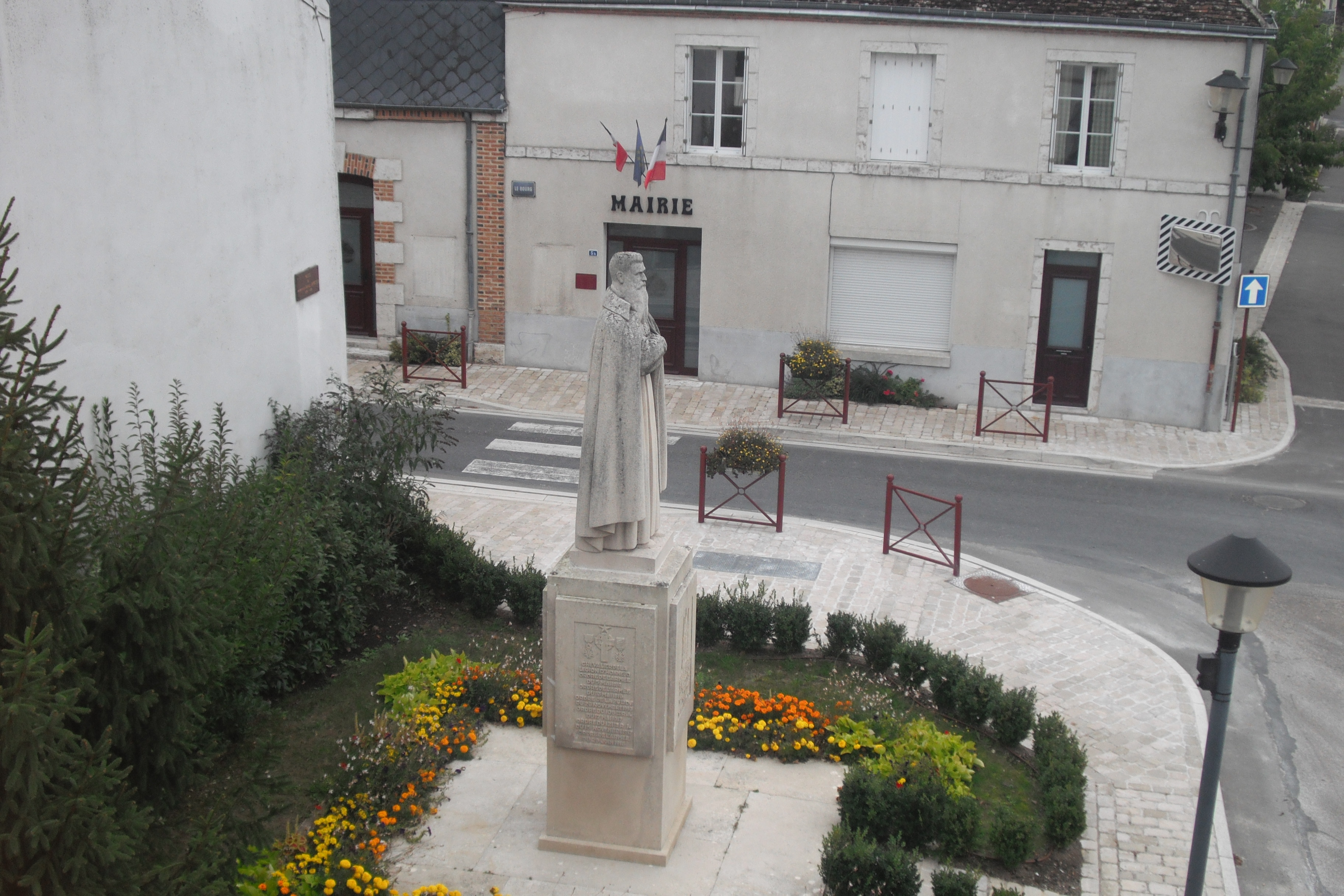
- Statue and town hall
- Location of La Ferté-Saint-Cyr
- Location within France Location within Centre-Val de Loire
- Coordinates: 47°39′24″N 1°40′30″E
- Country: France
- Region: Centre-Val de Loire
- Department: Loir-et-Cher
- Arrondissement: Blois
- Canton: Chambord
- Intercommunality: Grand Chambord

Government
  - Mayor (2020–2026): Anne-Marie Thomas
- Area^{1}: 57.93 km^{2} (22.37 sq mi)
- Elevation: 86 m (282 ft)
- Highest elevation: 131 m (430 ft)
- Lowest elevation: 78 m (256 ft)
- Population (2023): 1,093
  - Density: 18.87/km^{2} (48.87/sq mi)
- Time zone: UTC+01:00 (CET)
  - Summer (DST): UTC+02:00 (CEST)
- INSEE/Postal code: 41085 /41220
- ^{1} French Land Register data, which excludes lakes, ponds, glaciers > 1 km^{2} (0.386 sq mi or 247 acres) and river estuaries.

La Ferté-Saint-Cyr (French: [la fɛʁte sɛ̃ siʁ]) is a commune near Blois, in the Loir-et-Cher department in Centre-Val de Loire, France.

== Geography ==
The commune is traversed by the Cosson river.

== Population ==
Historical population
Year	Pop.	±% p.a.
1968	737	—
1975	745	+0.15%
1982	774	+0.55%
1990	809	+0.55%
1999	894	+1.12%
2007	966	+0.97%
2012	1,042	+1.53%
2017	1,056	+0.27%
2023	1,093	+0.58%
Source: INSEE

== See also ==
- Communes of the Loir-et-Cher department
