= Saint-Dyé-sur-Loire =

- Commune
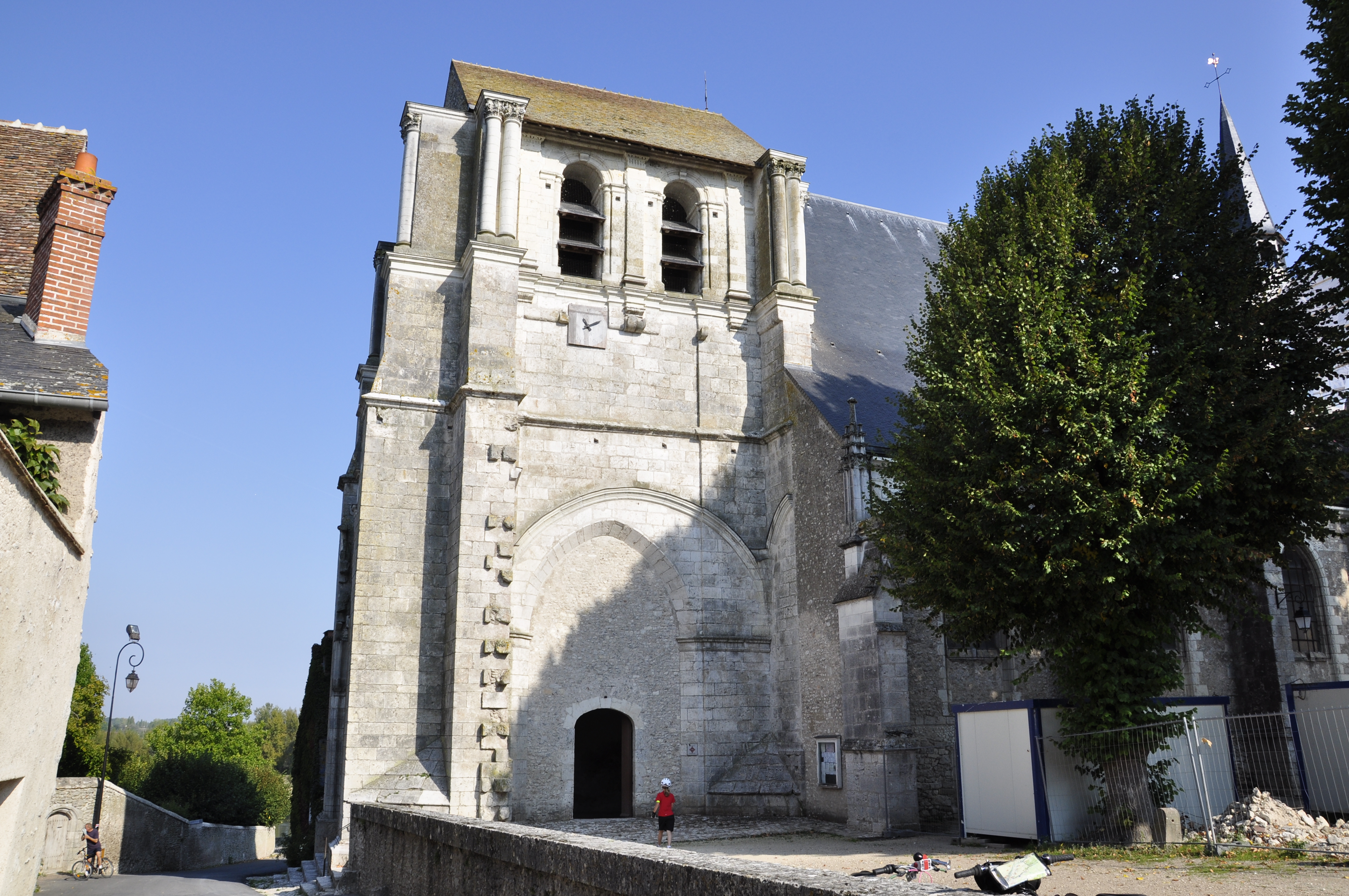

- Coat of arms
- Location of Saint-Dyé-sur-Loire
- Location within France Location within Centre-Val de Loire
- Coordinates: 47°39′24″N 1°29′22″E
- Country: France
- Region: Centre-Val de Loire
- Department: Loir-et-Cher
- Arrondissement: Blois
- Canton: Chambord

Government
  - Mayor (2020–2026): Didier Heitz
- Area^{1}: 5.51 km^{2} (2.13 sq mi)
- Elevation: 80 m (260 ft)
- Highest elevation: 92 m (302 ft)
- Lowest elevation: 72 m (236 ft)
- Population (2023): 1,153
  - Density: 209/km^{2} (542/sq mi)
- Time zone: UTC+01:00 (CET)
  - Summer (DST): UTC+02:00 (CEST)
- INSEE/Postal code: 41207 /41500
- ^{1} French Land Register data, which excludes lakes, ponds, glaciers > 1 km^{2} (0.386 sq mi or 247 acres) and river estuaries.

Saint-Dyé-sur-Loire (French pronunciation: [sɛ̃ dje syʁ lwaʁ], literally Saint-Dyé on Loire) is a commune in the Loir-et-Cher department, central France.

== Population ==
Historical population
Year	Pop.	±% p.a.
1968	629	—
1975	587	−0.98%
1982	762	+3.80%
1990	895	+2.03%
1999	945	+0.61%
2007	1,093	+1.84%
2012	1,119	+0.47%
2017	1,140	+0.37%
2023	1,153	+0.19%
Source: INSEE

== See also ==
- Communes of the Loir-et-Cher department
