= Tour-en-Sologne =

- Commune
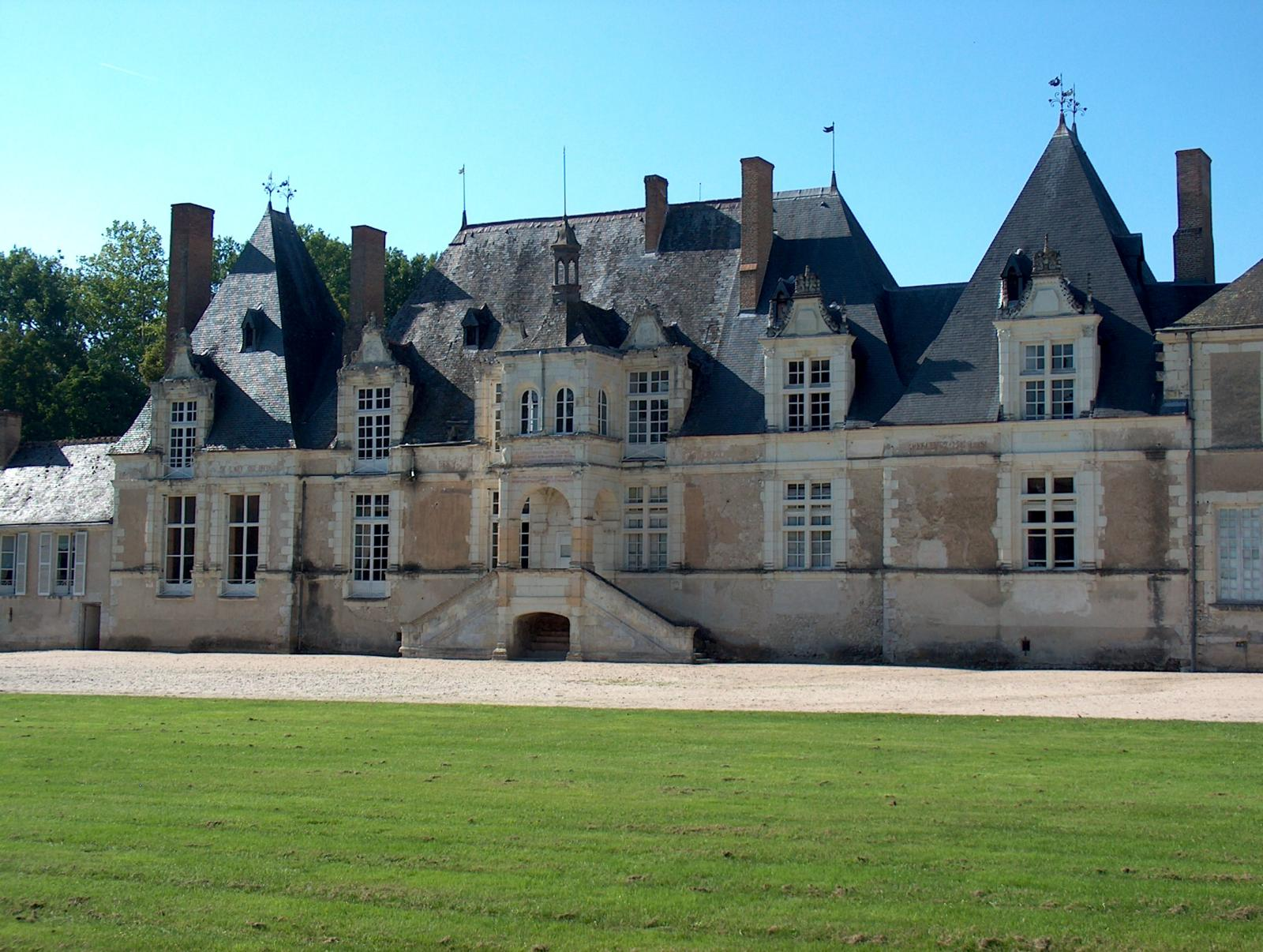
- Château de Villesavin

- Coat of arms
- Location of Tour-en-Sologne
- Location within France Location within Centre-Val de Loire
- Coordinates: 47°32′23″N 1°30′03″E
- Country: France
- Region: Centre-Val de Loire
- Department: Loir-et-Cher
- Arrondissement: Blois
- Canton: Chambord
- Intercommunality: Grand Chambord

Government
  - Mayor (2020–2026): Patrice Duchet
- Area^{1}: 26.34 km^{2} (10.17 sq mi)
- Elevation: 85 m (279 ft)
- Highest elevation: 123 m (404 ft)
- Lowest elevation: 72 m (236 ft)
- Population (2023): 1,140
  - Density: 43.3/km^{2} (112/sq mi)
- Time zone: UTC+01:00 (CET)
  - Summer (DST): UTC+02:00 (CEST)
- INSEE/Postal code: 41262 /41250
- ^{1} French Land Register data, which excludes lakes, ponds, glaciers > 1 km^{2} (0.386 sq mi or 247 acres) and river estuaries.

Tour-en-Sologne (French pronunciation: [tuʁ ɑ̃ sɔlɔɲ], literally Tour in Sologne) is a commune of the Loir-et-Cher department in the administrative region of Centre-Val de Loire, France.

== Population ==
Historical population
Year	Pop.	±% p.a.
1968	504	—
1975	529	+0.69%
1982	726	+4.63%
1990	794	+1.13%
1999	887	+1.24%
2007	885	−0.03%
2012	1,025	+2.98%
2017	1,117	+1.73%
2023	1,140	+0.34%
Source: INSEE

== See also ==
- Communes of the Loir-et-Cher department
