= Montlivault =

- Commune
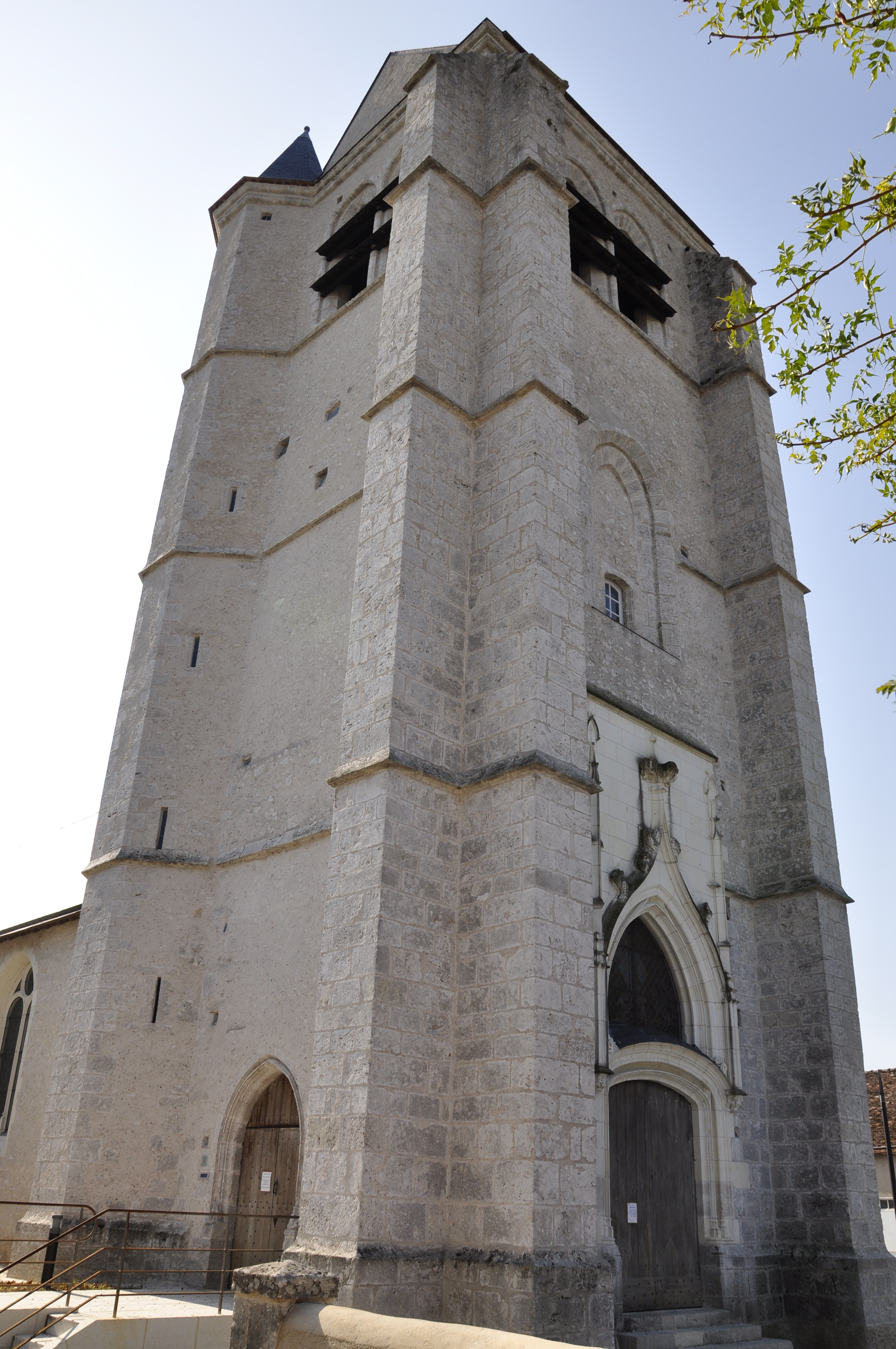
- Location of Montlivault
- Location within France Location within Centre-Val de Loire
- Coordinates: 47°38′25″N 1°26′40″E
- Country: France
- Region: Centre-Val de Loire
- Department: Loir-et-Cher
- Arrondissement: Blois
- Canton: Chambord

Government
  - Mayor (2020–2026): Gérard Chauveau
- Area^{1}: 10.73 km^{2} (4.14 sq mi)
- Elevation: 85 m (279 ft)
- Highest elevation: 90 m (300 ft)
- Lowest elevation: 67 m (220 ft)
- Population (2023): 1,293
  - Density: 120.5/km^{2} (312.1/sq mi)
- Time zone: UTC+01:00 (CET)
  - Summer (DST): UTC+02:00 (CEST)
- INSEE/Postal code: 41148 /41350
- ^{1} French Land Register data, which excludes lakes, ponds, glaciers > 1 km^{2} (0.386 sq mi or 247 acres) and river estuaries.

Montlivault (French pronunciation: [mɔ̃livo]) is a commune in the Loir-et-Cher department, and region of Centre-Val de Loire, France.

== Population ==
Historical population
| Year | Pop. | ±% p.a. |
|---|---|---|
| 1968 | 653 | — |
| 1975 | 660 | +0.15% |
| 1982 | 1,128 | +7.96% |
| 1990 | 1,257 | +1.36% |
| 1999 | 1,192 | −0.59% |
| 2007 | 1,321 | +1.29% |
| 2012 | 1,337 | +0.24% |
| 2017 | 1,377 | +0.59% |
| 2023 | 1,293 | −1.04% |
Source: INSEE

== See also ==
- Communes of the Loir-et-Cher department
