= Chambord, Loir-et-Cher =

Chambord
- Commune
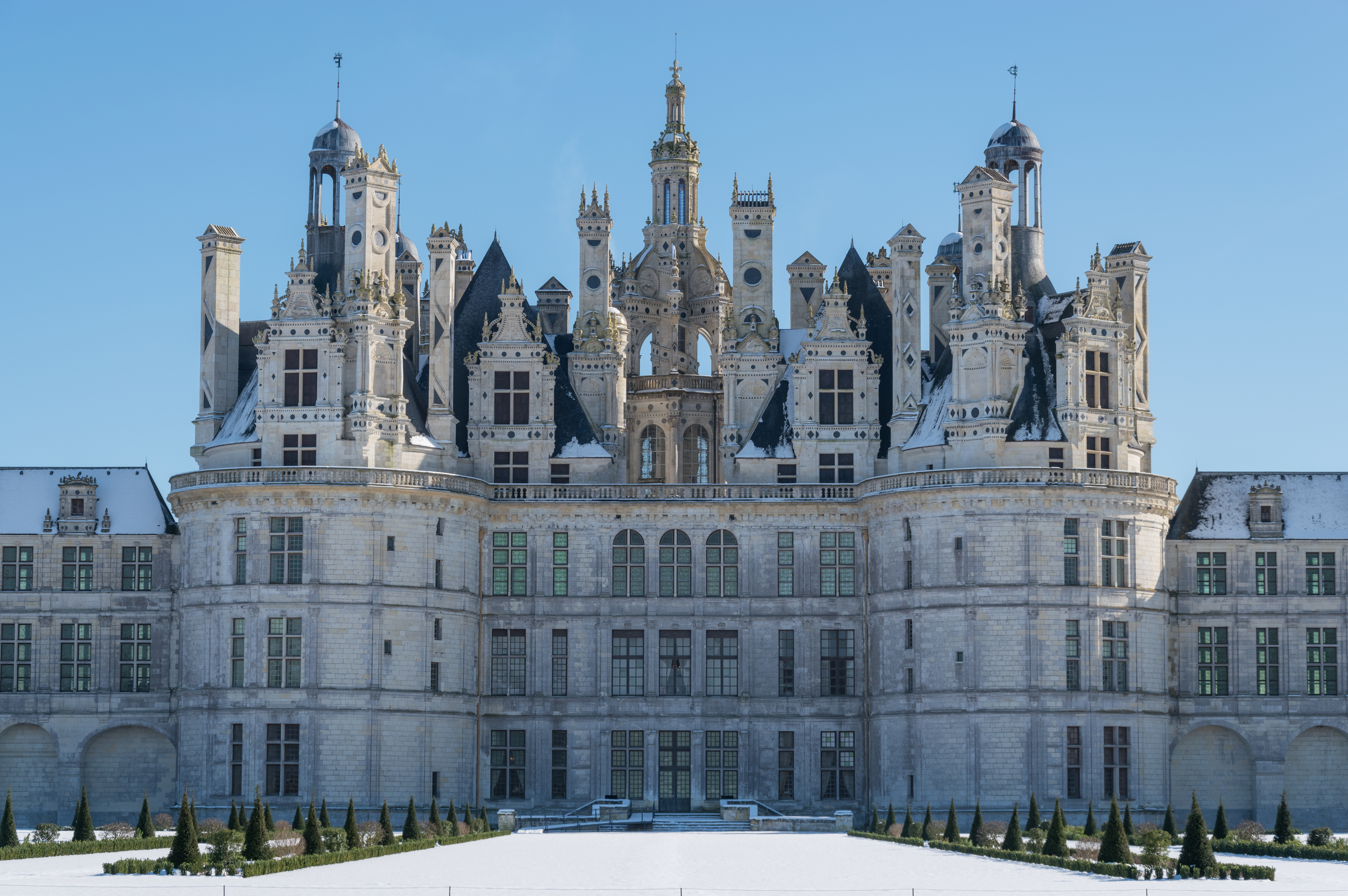
- The Château de Chambord in February 2018

- Coat of arms
- Location of Chambord
- Location within France Location within Centre-Val de Loire
- Coordinates: 47°36′50″N 1°31′12″E
- Country: France
- Region: Centre-Val de Loire
- Department: Loir-et-Cher
- Arrondissement: Blois
- Canton: Chambord
- Intercommunality: Grand Chambord

Government
  - Mayor (2020–2026): André Joly
- Area^{1}: 54.38 km^{2} (21.00 sq mi)
- Elevation: 81 m (266 ft)
- Highest elevation: 129 m (423 ft)
- Lowest elevation: 72 m (236 ft)
- Population (2023): 102
  - Density: 1.88/km^{2} (4.86/sq mi)
- Time zone: UTC+01:00 (CET)
  - Summer (DST): UTC+02:00 (CEST)
- INSEE/Postal code: 41034 /41250
- ^{1} French Land Register data, which excludes lakes, ponds, glaciers > 1 km^{2} (0.386 sq mi or 247 acres) and river estuaries.

Chambord (/ʃɒ̃ˈbɔːr/, US also /ʃæmˈbɔːrd/, French: [ʃɑ̃bɔʁ]) is a commune in the department of Loir-et-Cher, region of Centre-Val de Loire. It is best known for its Château de Chambord, part of the Loire Valley UNESCO World Heritage Site.

== Sights ==
It is best known as the location of the Château de Chambord, one of the most recognisable châteaux in the world because of its very distinct French Renaissance architecture. The château forms a parallelogram flanked at the angles by round towers and enclosing a square block of buildings, the façade of which forms the centre of the main front. The profusion of turrets, pinnacles, and dormer windows which decorates the roof of this, the chief portion of the château, constitutes the main feature of the exterior, while in the interior are a well-preserved chapel of the 16th century and a famous double staircase, the construction of which permits two people to ascend and descend respectively without seeing one another. There are 440 apartments, containing pictures of the 17th century and souvenirs of the comte de Chambord.

The château was originally a hunting-box of the counts of Blois, the rebuilding of which was begun by Francis I. in 1526, and completed under Henry II. It was the residence of several succeeding monarchs, and under Louis XIV. considerable alterations were made. In the same reign Molière performed Monsieur de Pourceaugnac and Le Bourgeois gentilhomme for the first time in the theatre. Stanislaus, king of Poland, lived at Chambord, which was bestowed by his son-in-law, Louis XV., upon Marshal Saxe. It was given by Napoleon to Marshal Berthier, from whose widow it was purchased by subscription in 1821, and presented to the duc de Bordeaux, the representative of the older branch of the Bourbons, who assumed from it the title of comte de Chambord. On his death in 1883 it came by bequest into the possession of the family of Parma.

== Population ==
Historical population
Year	Pop.	±% p.a.
1968	267	—
1975	220	−2.73%
1982	197	−1.57%
1990	200	+0.19%
1999	185	−0.86%
2007	150	−2.59%
2012	120	−4.36%
2017	93	−4.97%
2023	102	+1.55%
Source: INSEE

== See also ==
- Communes of the Loir-et-Cher department
