= Chouzy-sur-Cisse =

- Part of Valloire-sur-Cisse
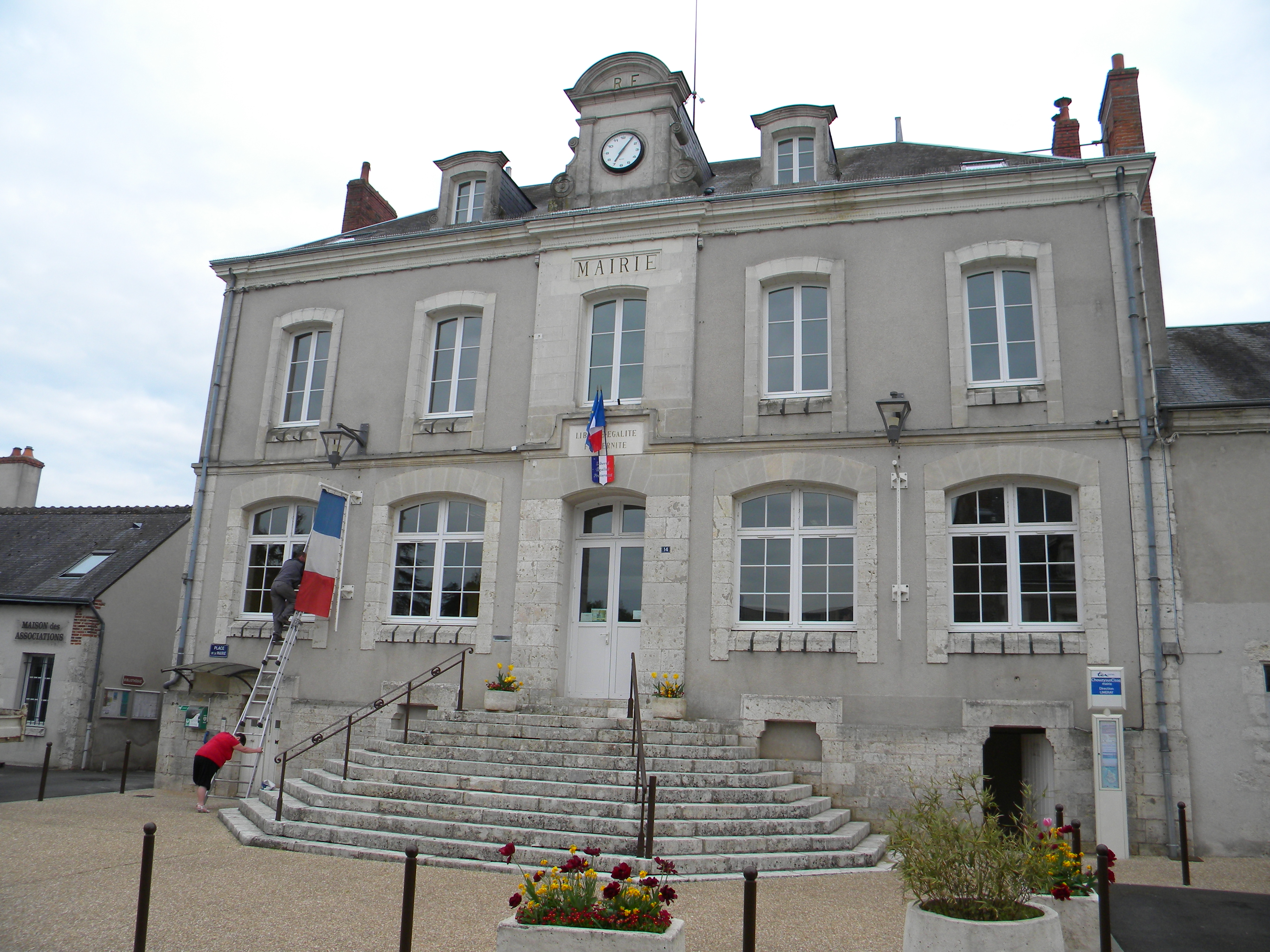
- Town hall

- Coat of arms
- Location of Chouzy-sur-Cisse
- Location within France Location within Centre-Val de Loire
- Coordinates: 47°31′34″N 1°14′53″E
- Country: France
- Region: Centre-Val de Loire
- Department: Loir-et-Cher
- Arrondissement: Blois
- Canton: Veuzain-sur-Loire
- Commune: Valloire-sur-Cisse
- Area^{1}: 22.43 km^{2} (8.66 sq mi)
- Elevation: 102 m (335 ft)
- Highest elevation: 115 m (377 ft)
- Lowest elevation: 61 m (200 ft)
- Population (2022): 2,013
  - Density: 89.75/km^{2} (232.4/sq mi)
- Time zone: UTC+01:00 (CET)
  - Summer (DST): UTC+02:00 (CEST)
- Postal code: 41150
- ^{1} French Land Register data, which excludes lakes, ponds, glaciers > 1 km^{2} (0.386 sq mi or 247 acres) and river estuaries.

Chouzy-sur-Cisse (French pronunciation: [ʃuzi syʁ sis], literally Chouzy on Cisse), commonly known as Chouzy, is a former commune in the Loir-et-Cher department, Central France. On January 1, 2017, it was merged into the new commune Valloire-sur-Cisse.

== Population ==
Historical population

Year	Pop.	±% p.a.
1793	973	—
1800	1,020	+0.68%
1806	1,013	−0.11%
1821	1,092	+0.50%
1831	1,239	+1.27%
1836	1,317	+1.23%
1841	1,390	+1.08%
1846	1,470	+1.13%
1851	1,469	−0.01%
1856	1,392	−1.07%
1861	1,442	+0.71%
1866	1,465	+0.32%
1872	1,428	−0.43%
1876	1,404	−0.42%
1881	1,454	+0.70%
1886	1,455	+0.01%
1891	1,469	+0.19%
1896	1,425	−0.61%

Year	Pop.	±% p.a.
1901	1,405	−0.28%
1906	1,402	−0.04%
1911	1,296	−1.56%
1921	1,105	−1.58%
1926	1,131	+0.47%
1931	1,034	−1.78%
1936	974	−1.19%
1946	1,023	+0.49%
1954	1,014	−0.11%
1962	1,129	+1.35%
1968	1,159	+0.44%
1975	1,261	+1.21%
1982	1,476	+2.27%
1990	1,619	+1.16%
1999	1,866	+1.59%
2006	1,806	−0.47%
2022	2,013	+0.68%

Source: EHESS and INSEE

== See also ==
- Communes of the Loir-et-Cher department
