= Onzain =

- Part of Veuzain-sur-Loire
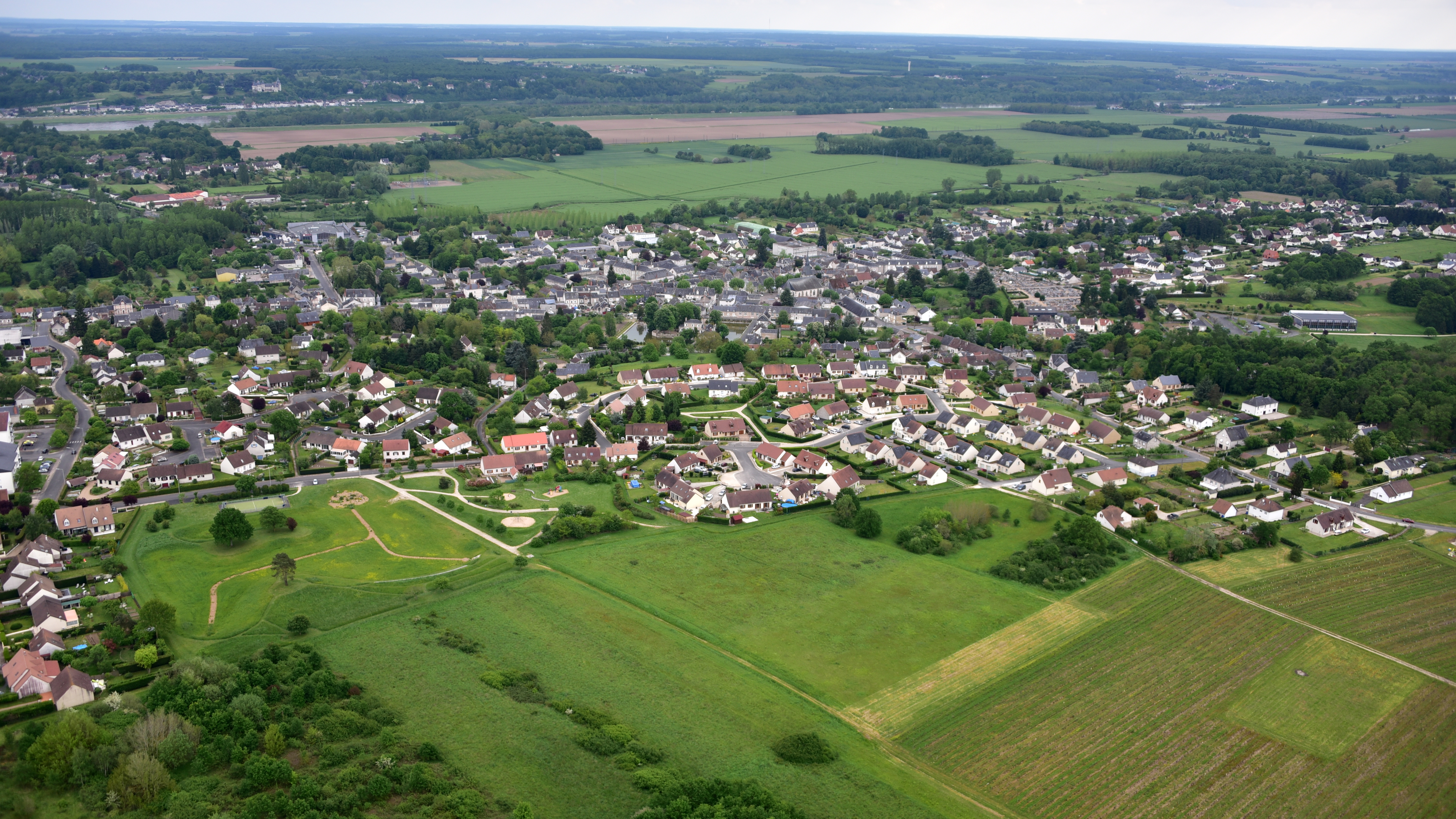
- Areal view of the town

- Coat of arms
- Location of Onzain
- Location within France Location within Centre-Val de Loire
- Coordinates: 47°30′01″N 1°10′30″E
- Country: France
- Region: Centre-Val de Loire
- Department: Loir-et-Cher
- Arrondissement: Blois
- Canton: Veuzain-sur-Loire
- Commune: Veuzain-sur-Loire
- Area^{1}: 29.89 km^{2} (11.54 sq mi)
- Highest elevation: 119 m (390 ft)
- Lowest elevation: 59 m (194 ft)
- Population (2022): 3,113
  - Density: 104.1/km^{2} (269.7/sq mi)
- Time zone: UTC+01:00 (CET)
  - Summer (DST): UTC+02:00 (CEST)
- Postal code: 41150
- ^{1} French Land Register data, which excludes lakes, ponds, glaciers > 1 km^{2} (0.386 sq mi or 247 acres) and river estuaries.

Onzain (French pronunciation: [ɔ̃zɛ̃]) is a former commune in the French department of Loir-et-Cher, administrative region of Centre-Val de Loire. On 1 January 2017, it was merged into the new commune Veuzain-sur-Loire. In 2022 its population was 3,113.

Onzain is twinned with Darley Dale, England and with Flein on the southern edge of Heilbronn, Baden-Württemberg, Germany.

== See also ==
- Communes of the Loir-et-Cher department
