= Veuves =

- Part of Veuzain-sur-Loire
- Coat of arms
- Location of Veuves
- Location within France Location within Centre-Val de Loire
- Coordinates: 47°28′19″N 1°07′33″E
- Country: France
- Region: Centre-Val de Loire
- Department: Loir-et-Cher
- Arrondissement: Blois
- Canton: Veuzain-sur-Loire
- Commune: Veuzain-sur-Loire
- Area^{1}: 8.07 km^{2} (3.12 sq mi)
- Elevation: 41 m (135 ft)
- Highest elevation: 65 m (213 ft)
- Lowest elevation: 58 m (190 ft)
- Population (2022): 214
  - Density: 26.5/km^{2} (68.7/sq mi)
- Time zone: UTC+01:00 (CET)
  - Summer (DST): UTC+02:00 (CEST)
- Postal code: 41150
- ^{1} French Land Register data, which excludes lakes, ponds, glaciers > 1 km^{2} (0.386 sq mi or 247 acres) and river estuaries.

Veuves (French pronunciation: [vœv]) is a former commune in the Loir-et-Cher department in central France. On 1 January 2017, it was merged into the new commune Veuzain-sur-Loire. Its population was 214 in 2022.

== See also ==
- Communes of the Loir-et-Cher department
