= Claude Ferval =

French writer (1856–1943)

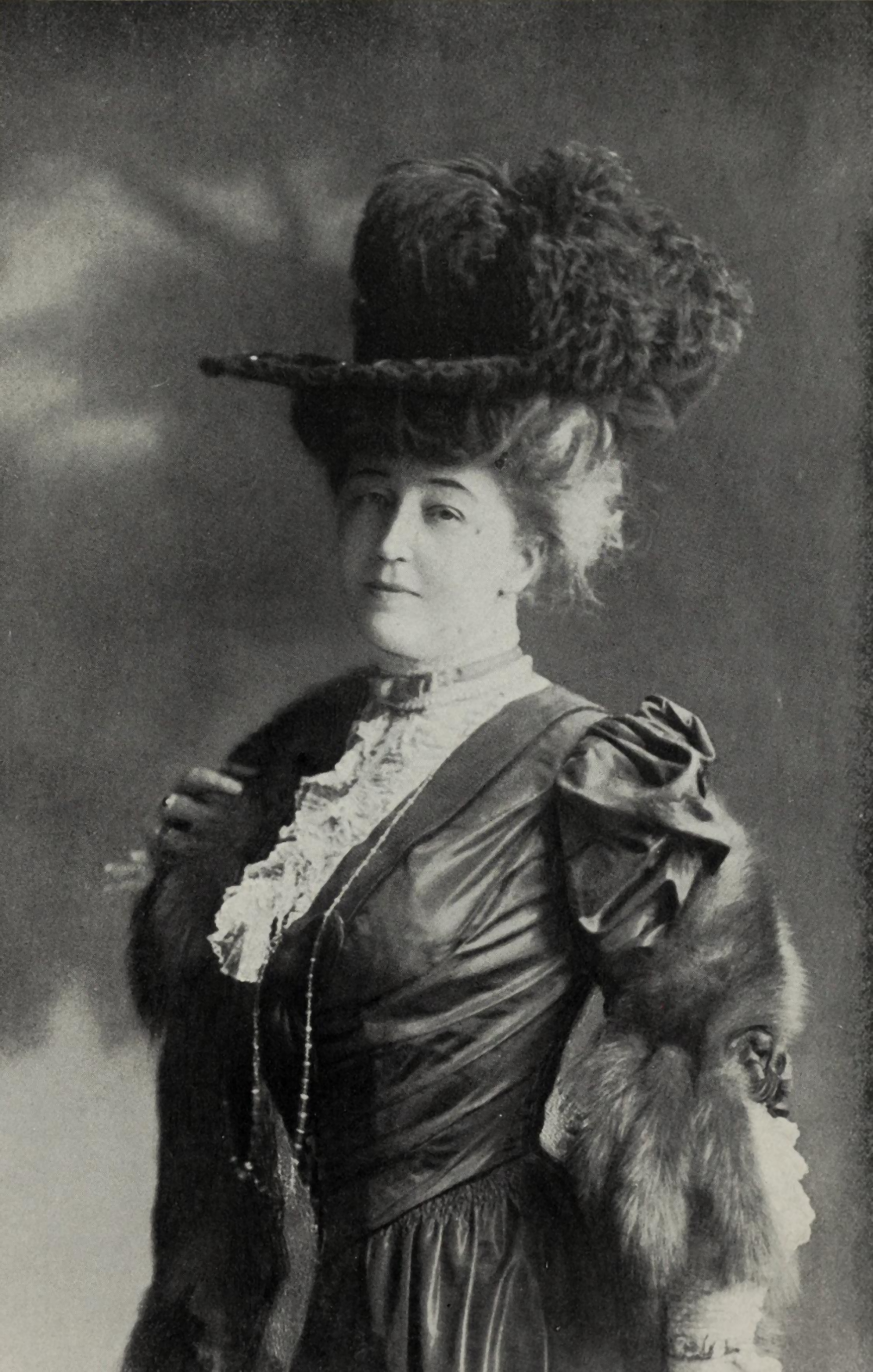
- Claude Ferval in 1907
- Born: Marguerite Thomas-Galline; 15 June 1856; Agen, France
- Died: 20 April 1943 (aged 86); Herbault (Loir-et-Cher), France
- Burial place: Passy Cemetery, Paris, France
- Other name: Marguerite Aimery Harty de Pierrebourg
- Occupations: Novelist, biographer, poet
- Known for: Pseudonymous writing
- Spouse: Baron Aimery Harty de Pierrebourg
- Children: 2

Claude Ferval (1856 – 1943) was a French novelist, biographer and poet. Claude Ferval was the pen name used by Baroness Marguerite Aimery Harty de Pierrebourg, née Thomas-Galline.

== Biography ==
Marguerite Thomas-Galline was born on 15 June 1856 in Agen. Her father was a general and moved from garrison to garrison. She spent part of her childhood in Lyon where she was a boarder at the Assumption Convent. In Lyon on 18 April 1876, she married Baron Aimery Harty de Pierrebourg and they had a son and daughter. She followed him to Algeria and his other postings. For about ten years she devoted herself to painting, attending the Académie Julian, working under the direction of painter Tony Robert-Fleury and exhibiting at the Paris Salon.

After her daughter's marriage in 1910 Count Georges de Lauris, Ferval wrote and published her first novel L'autre amour, which received good reviews and a prize from the Académie Française. Claude Ferval separated from her husband and later had a long affair with novelist Paul Hervieu, who died in 1915. She authored many novels. A friend and a regular visitor to "Madame de Pierrebourg's Salon" located at 1 avenue du Bois de Boulogne, Marcel Proust, appreciated the literary quality of Ferval's novels. He even asked her opinion about his own writings: "for the book I am finishing, I would like to have your advice"; "if what I think really worries you a little [...] nothing is more reciprocal. Weren't you, I think, the only person I used to ask for advice for an edition of my pastiches?"

Claude Ferval devoted the rest of her literary career to writing biographies, most often of great female figures. The critical reception was generally very favorable, for example author Maurice Rostand wrote about her book, Ninon et son cortège, "Here is a very beautiful book and of such endearing poetry that it is impossible to interrupt the reading once begun. The charm of Ninon seems to still live there, stolen from the smile of her portraits, from the silence of her tomb. And the charm that emanates from it, this charm at once so persistent and so strong, is the most different from that which generally arises from these historical resurrections. It is that, like any superior work, this beautiful book has a secret..."

In 1912, Ferval was one of the members of the all-female jury, and became jury president, for the Prix de la Vie Heureuse, whose name, in 1922, would become the Prix Fémina. She was a member of the Société des Gens de Lettres.

She died on 20 April 1943, in Herbault (Loir-et-Cher), France, and is buried in Passy Cemetery in Paris, in the tomb of her deceased lover Paul Hervieu.

== Distinctions ==
Claude Ferval received two prizes from the Académie Française

- 1934, the Academy Prize for Rousseau and Women (3,000 francs)
- 1903, the Montyon Prize for L'autre amour (1,000 francs)
