= Valloire-sur-Cisse =

- Commune
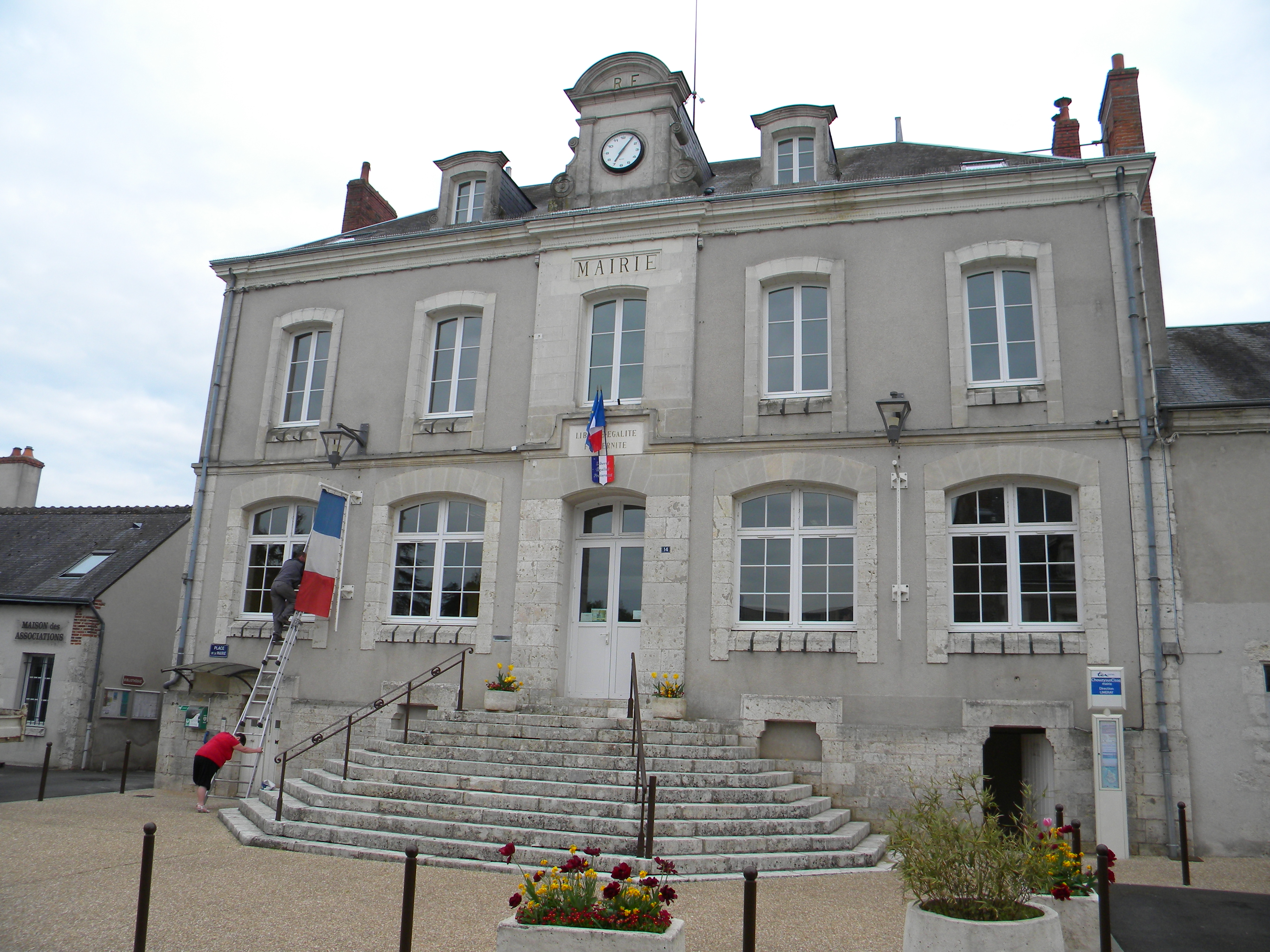
- Town hall
- Location of Valloire-sur-Cisse
- Location within France Location within Centre-Val de Loire
- Coordinates: 47°31′34″N 1°14′53″E
- Country: France
- Region: Centre-Val de Loire
- Department: Loir-et-Cher
- Arrondissement: Blois
- Canton: Veuzain-sur-Loire
- Intercommunality: CA Blois Agglopolys

Government
  - Mayor (2020–2026): Catherine Lheritier
- Area^{1}: 40.36 km^{2} (15.58 sq mi)
- Highest elevation: 122 m (400 ft)
- Lowest elevation: 61 m (200 ft)
- Population (2023): 2,385
  - Density: 59.09/km^{2} (153.1/sq mi)
- Time zone: UTC+01:00 (CET)
  - Summer (DST): UTC+02:00 (CEST)
- INSEE/Postal code: 41055 /41150
- ^{1} French Land Register data, which excludes lakes, ponds, glaciers > 1 km^{2} (0.386 sq mi or 247 acres) and river estuaries.

Valloire-sur-Cisse (French pronunciation: [valwaʁ syʁ sis], literally Valloire on Cisse) is a commune in the department of Loir-et-Cher, central France. The municipality was established on 1 January 2017 by merger of the former communes of Chouzy-sur-Cisse (the seat), Coulanges and Seillac.

== Population ==
Population data refer to the commune in its geography as of January 2025.

Historical population
Year	Pop.	±% p.a.
1968	1,464	—
1975	1,630	+1.55%
1982	1,842	+1.76%
1990	1,955	+0.75%
1999	2,256	+1.60%
2007	2,202	−0.30%
2012	2,321	+1.06%
2017	2,438	+0.99%
2023	2,385	−0.37%
Source: INSEE

== See also ==
- Communes of the Loir-et-Cher department
