= Coulanges =

Coulanges may refer to the following:

== People ==
- Benoît Coulanges (born 1994), French mountain biker
- Joaquim Coulanges (born 2006), Canadian soccer player
- Numa Denis Fustel de Coulanges (1830–1889), French historian

== Places ==
- Coulanges, Allier, a commune in the department of Allier
- Coulanges, Loir-et-Cher, a commune in the department of Loir-et-Cher
- Coulanges-la-Vineuse, a commune in the department of Yonne
- Coulanges-sur-Yonne, a commune in the department of Yonne
- Coulanges-lès-Nevers, a commune in the department of Nièvre
