= Seillac =

- Part of Valloire-sur-Cisse
- Coat of arms
- Location of Seillac
- Location within France Location within Centre-Val de Loire
- Coordinates: 47°32′45″N 1°09′29″E
- Country: France
- Region: Centre-Val de Loire
- Department: Loir-et-Cher
- Arrondissement: Blois
- Canton: Veuzain-sur-Loire
- Commune: Valloire-sur-Cisse
- Area^{1}: 9.58 km^{2} (3.70 sq mi)
- Elevation: 120 m (390 ft)
- Highest elevation: 122 m (400 ft)
- Lowest elevation: 82 m (269 ft)
- Population (2022): 111
  - Density: 11.6/km^{2} (30.0/sq mi)
- Time zone: UTC+01:00 (CET)
  - Summer (DST): UTC+02:00 (CEST)
- Postal code: 41150
- ^{1} French Land Register data, which excludes lakes, ponds, glaciers > 1 km^{2} (0.386 sq mi or 247 acres) and river estuaries.

Seillac (French pronunciation: [sɛjak]) is a former commune in the Loir-et-Cher department of central France. On 1 January 2017, it was merged into the new commune, Valloire-sur-Cisse. Its population was 111 in 2022.

== See also ==
- Communes of the Loir-et-Cher department
