= Coulanges, Loir-et-Cher =

Coulanges
- Part of Valloire-sur-Cisse
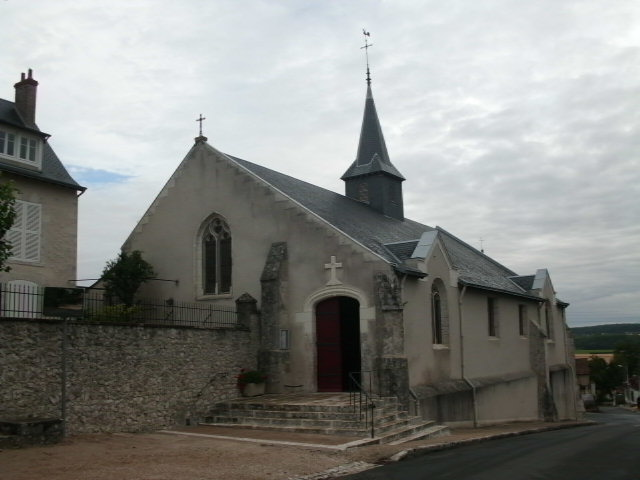

- Coat of arms
- Location of Coulanges
- Location within France Location within Centre-Val de Loire
- Coordinates: 47°32′38″N 1°13′26″E
- Country: France
- Region: Centre-Val de Loire
- Department: Loir-et-Cher
- Arrondissement: Blois
- Canton: Veuzain-sur-Loire
- Commune: Valloire-sur-Cisse
- Area^{1}: 8.35 km^{2} (3.22 sq mi)
- Elevation: 105 m (344 ft)
- Highest elevation: 116 m (381 ft)
- Lowest elevation: 67 m (220 ft)
- Population (2023): 324
  - Density: 38.8/km^{2} (100/sq mi)
- Time zone: UTC+01:00 (CET)
  - Summer (DST): UTC+02:00 (CEST)
- Postal code: 41150
- ^{1} French Land Register data, which excludes lakes, ponds, glaciers > 1 km^{2} (0.386 sq mi or 247 acres) and river estuaries.

Coulanges (French pronunciation: [kulɑ̃ʒ]) is a former commune in the Loir-et-Cher department of central France. On 1 January 2017, it was merged into the new commune Valloire-sur-Cisse.

== See also ==
- Communes of the Loir-et-Cher department
