= Santenay, Loir-et-Cher =

Santenay
- Commune
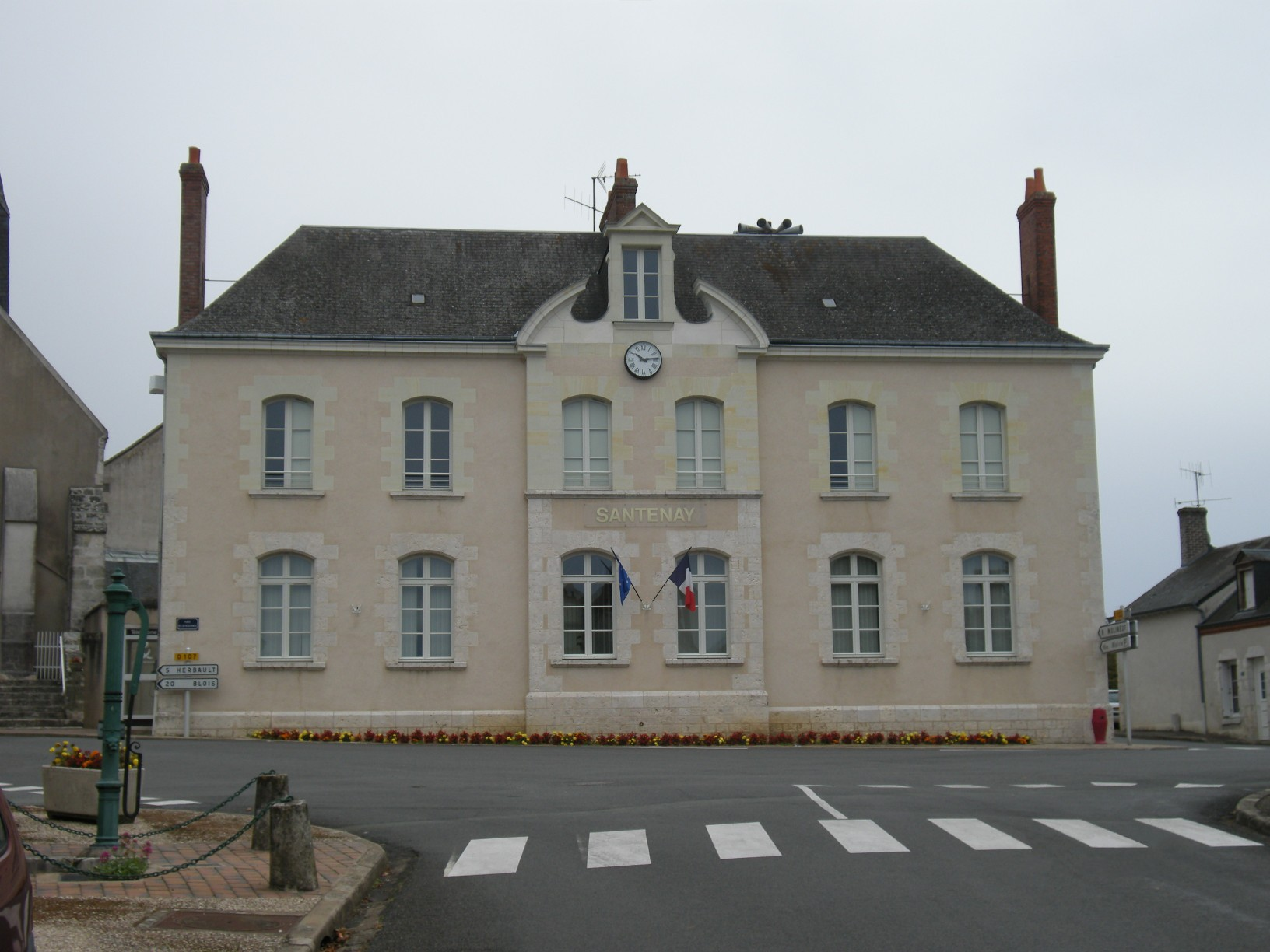
- Town hall
- Location of Santenay
- Location within France Location within Centre-Val de Loire
- Coordinates: 47°34′03″N 1°07′02″E
- Country: France
- Region: Centre-Val de Loire
- Department: Loir-et-Cher
- Arrondissement: Blois
- Canton: Veuzain-sur-Loire
- Intercommunality: CA Blois Agglopolys

Government
  - Mayor (2020–2026): Alain Prot
- Area^{1}: 30.28 km^{2} (11.69 sq mi)
- Elevation: 115 m (377 ft)
- Highest elevation: 144 m (472 ft)
- Lowest elevation: 94 m (308 ft)
- Population (2023): 296
  - Density: 9.78/km^{2} (25.3/sq mi)
- Time zone: UTC+01:00 (CET)
  - Summer (DST): UTC+02:00 (CEST)
- INSEE/Postal code: 41234 /41190
- ^{1} French Land Register data, which excludes lakes, ponds, glaciers > 1 km^{2} (0.386 sq mi or 247 acres) and river estuaries.

Santenay (French pronunciation: [sɑ̃tnɛ]) is a commune in the Loir-et-Cher department in central France, located between Château-Renault and Blois.

== Population ==
Historical population
Year	Pop.	±% p.a.
1968	360	—
1975	307	−2.25%
1982	262	−2.24%
1990	229	−1.67%
1999	254	+1.16%
2007	265	+0.53%
2012	286	+1.54%
2017	290	+0.28%
2023	296	+0.34%
Source: INSEE

== See also ==
- Communes of the Loir-et-Cher department
