= Les Montils =

- Commune
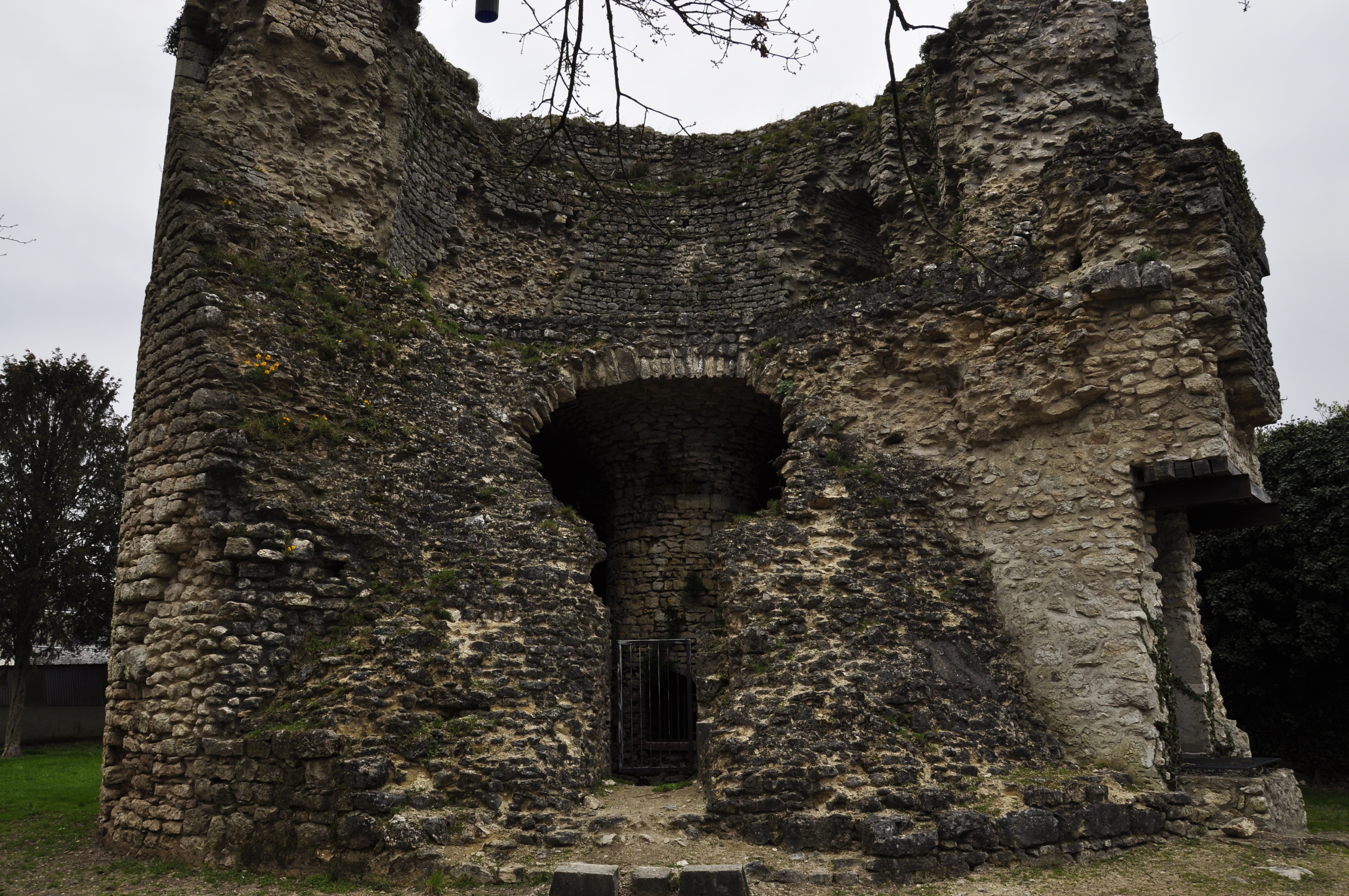
- Ruins of a tower

- Coat of arms
- Location of Les Montils
- Location within France Location within Centre-Val de Loire
- Coordinates: 47°29′46″N 1°17′52″E
- Country: France
- Region: Centre-Val de Loire
- Department: Loir-et-Cher
- Arrondissement: Blois
- Canton: Blois-3
- Intercommunality: CA Blois Agglopolys

Government
  - Mayor (2020–2026): Alain Duchalais
- Area^{1}: 9.27 km^{2} (3.58 sq mi)
- Elevation: 92 m (302 ft)
- Highest elevation: 101 m (331 ft)
- Lowest elevation: 62 m (203 ft)
- Population (2023): 1,945
  - Density: 210/km^{2} (543/sq mi)
- Time zone: UTC+01:00 (CET)
  - Summer (DST): UTC+02:00 (CEST)
- INSEE/Postal code: 41147 /41120
- ^{1} French Land Register data, which excludes lakes, ponds, glaciers > 1 km^{2} (0.386 sq mi or 247 acres) and river estuaries.

Les Montils (French pronunciation: [le mɔ̃ti]) is a commune in the Loir-et-Cher department of central France.

== Geography ==
Les Montils is at the edge of the Sologne, at an altitude of 80 m (approx.). This town is bordered by the Cosson in the north, through the Beuvron. To the west of the village, the Bièvre flows into Beuvron. At this point, there are numerous beavers.

== Tourism ==
- Recreation area Masnières
- A model railway with a train that can be ridden by visitors in the summer months.

== Sights ==
- From the old village remains a strong tower, the tower of Montils, an arch and some walls.
- Château de Frileuse

== Agriculture ==
- Wine : Cheverny, AOC

== Population ==
Historical population
Year	Pop.	±% p.a.
1968	717	—
1975	808	+1.72%
1982	1,046	+3.76%
1990	1,196	+1.69%
1999	1,436	+2.05%
2007	1,644	+1.71%
2012	1,868	+2.59%
2017	1,943	+0.79%
2023	1,945	+0.02%
Source: INSEE

== Personalities ==
- Antonio de La Gandara (1861–1917), painter

== See also ==
- Communes of the Loir-et-Cher department
