= Lancôme, Loir-et-Cher =

Lancôme
- Commune
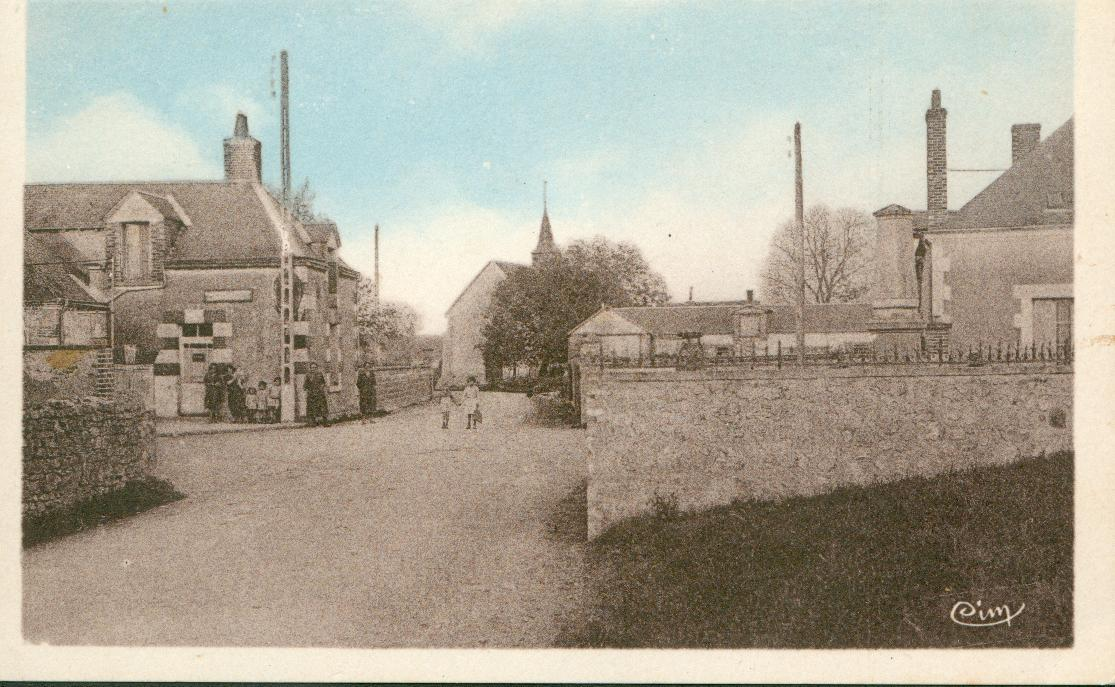
- Location of Lancôme
- Location within France Location within Centre-Val de Loire
- Coordinates: 47°38′59″N 1°07′27″E
- Country: France
- Region: Centre-Val de Loire
- Department: Loir-et-Cher
- Arrondissement: Blois
- Canton: Veuzain-sur-Loire
- Intercommunality: CA Blois Agglopolys

Government
  - Mayor (2020–2026): Philippe Bourgueil
- Area^{1}: 9.89 km^{2} (3.82 sq mi)
- Elevation: 118 m (387 ft)
- Highest elevation: 129 m (423 ft)
- Lowest elevation: 105 m (344 ft)
- Population (2023): 123
  - Density: 12.4/km^{2} (32.2/sq mi)
- Time zone: UTC+01:00 (CET)
  - Summer (DST): UTC+02:00 (CEST)
- INSEE/Postal code: 41108 /41190
- ^{1} French Land Register data, which excludes lakes, ponds, glaciers > 1 km^{2} (0.386 sq mi or 247 acres) and river estuaries.

Lancôme (French pronunciation: [lɑ̃kom]) is a commune in the Loir-et-Cher department of central France.

== Population ==
Historical population
Year	Pop.	±% p.a.
1968	165	—
1975	139	−2.42%
1982	133	−0.63%
1990	96	−3.99%
1999	114	+1.93%
2007	142	+2.78%
2012	131	−1.60%
2017	122	−1.41%
2023	123	+0.14%
Source: INSEE

== See also ==
- Communes of the Loir-et-Cher department
