= Paul Hervieu =

French novelist and playwright

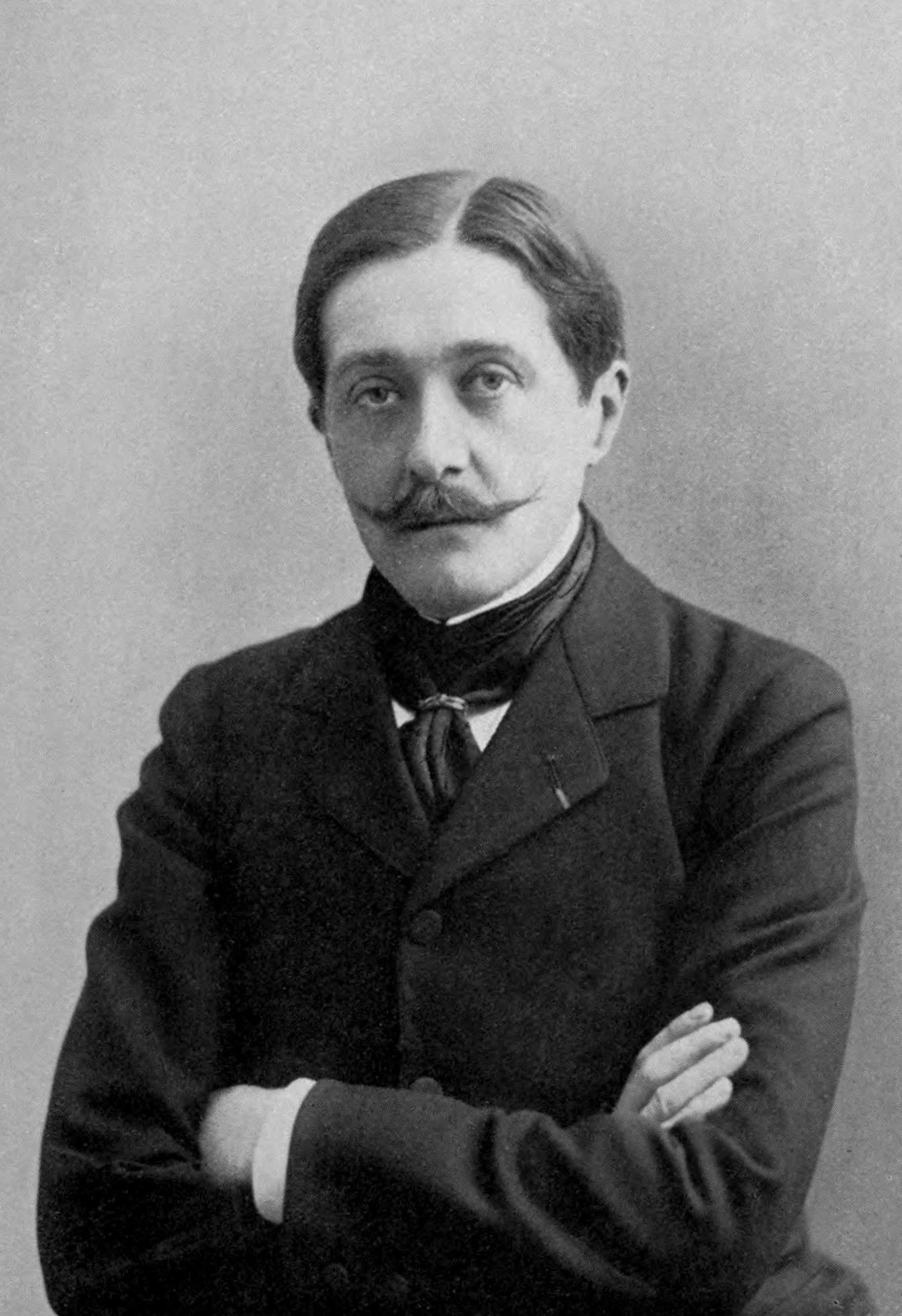
- Hervieu in 1899
- Born: Paul-Ernest Hervieu; 2 September 1857; Neuilly-sur-Seine, France
- Died: 25 October 1915 (aged 58); Paris, France
- Resting place: Passy Cemetery; Paris, France
- Occupations: Novelist and playwright
- Writing career
- Language: French
- Period: 1892–1905

Paul Hervieu (2 September 1857 – 25 October 1915) was a French novelist and playwright.

== Early years ==
He was born Paul-Ernest Hervieu in Neuilly-sur-Seine, France. Hervieu was born into a wealthy upper-middle-class family. He studied law, but sought also had contact with writers like Leconte de Lisle, Paul Verlaine and Alphonse Daudet. After graduating in 1877, he first practiced in a law firm, in 1879 qualified for the diplomatic service, and was posted in the French Embassy in Mexico. But he preferred to remain in France, where he attended fashionable literary salons, and the acquaintance of artists and writers such as Marcel Proust, Paul Bourget, Henri Meilhac, Ludovic Halévy, Guy de Maupassant and Edgar Degas. On the recommendation of his friend Octave Mirbeau, he tried his hand as a journalist.

== Career ==
Hervieu was called to the bar in 1877, and, after serving some time in the office of the president of the council, he qualified for the diplomatic service, but resigned on his nomination in 1881 to a secretaryship in the French legation in Mexico.

He contributed novels, tales and essays to the chief Parisian papers and reviews, and published a series of clever novels, including L'Inconnue (1887), Flirt (1890, illustrated by Madeleine Lemaire), L'Exorcisée (1891), Peints par eux-mêmes (1893), an ironic study written in the form of letters, and L'Armature (1895), dramatized in 1905 by Eugène Brieux.

Hervieu's plays are built upon a severely logical method, the mechanism of which is sometimes so evident as to destroy the necessary sense of illusion. The closing words of La Course du flambeau (1901) "Pour ma fille, j'ai tué ma mère" (For my daughter, I killed my mother), are an example of his selection of a plot representing an extreme theory. The riddle in L'Énigme (1901) (staged at Wyndham's Theatre, London, 1 March 1902, as Caesar's Wife) is, however, worked out with great art, and Le Dédale (1903), dealing with the obstacles to the remarriage of a divorced woman, is reckoned among the masterpieces of the modern French stage. He produced his last play, Le Destin est Maître, in 1914.

=== Honours ===
He was elected to the Académie française in 1900.

== Death ==
Hervieu died at age 57 in Paris, France, and was interred in its Passy Cemetery. His lover Claude Ferval who died in 1943 is interred with him.

== Bibliography ==
- Les Paroles restent (Vaudeville, 17 November 1892)
- Les Tenailes (Théâtre Français, 28 September 1895)
- La loi de l’homme (Théâtre Français, 15 February 1897)
- La Course du flambeau (Vaudeville, 17 April 1901)
- Point de lendemain (Théâtre de l'Odéon, 18 October 1901), a dramatic version of a story by Vivant Denon
- L'Énigme (Théâtre Français, 5 November 1901)
- Théroigne de Méricourt (Théâtre Sarah Bernhardt, 23 September 1902)
- Le Dédale (Théâtre Français, 19 December 1903)
- Le Réveil (Théâtre Français, 18 December 1905)

== See also ==
- List of French-language authors
- List of French novelists
- List of French playwrights
- List of members of the Académie française
