= Saint-Cyr-du-Gault =

- Commune
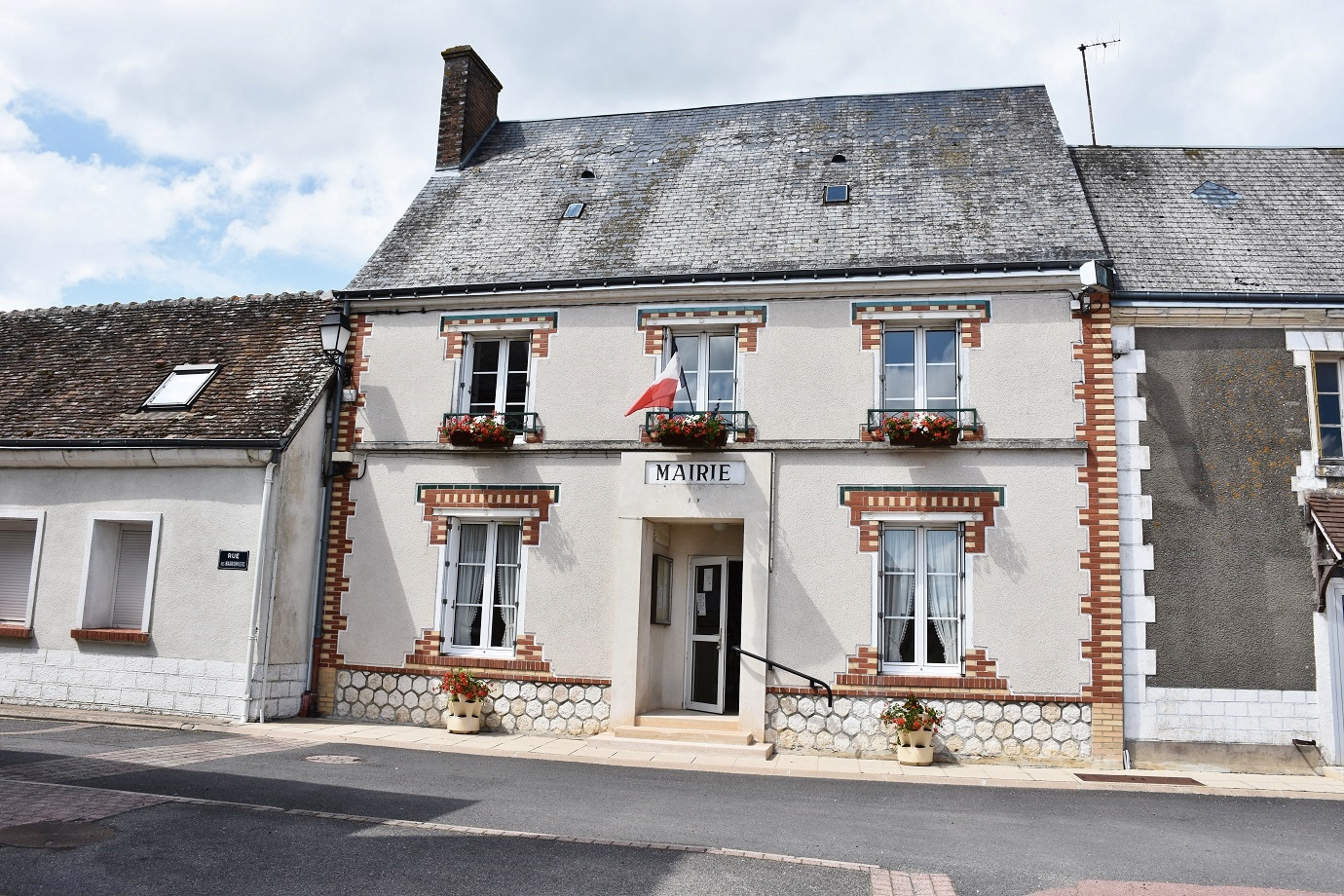
- Town hall
- Location of Saint-Cyr-du-Gault
- Location within France Location within Centre-Val de Loire
- Coordinates: 47°37′18″N 1°01′50″E
- Country: France
- Region: Centre-Val de Loire
- Department: Loir-et-Cher
- Arrondissement: Blois
- Canton: Veuzain-sur-Loire
- Intercommunality: CA Blois Agglopolys

Government
  - Mayor (2020–2026): Michel Fesneau
- Area^{1}: 26.06 km^{2} (10.06 sq mi)
- Elevation: 120 m (390 ft)
- Highest elevation: 149 m (489 ft)
- Lowest elevation: 108 m (354 ft)
- Population (2023): 173
  - Density: 6.64/km^{2} (17.2/sq mi)
- Time zone: UTC+01:00 (CET)
  - Summer (DST): UTC+02:00 (CEST)
- INSEE/Postal code: 41205 /41190
- ^{1} French Land Register data, which excludes lakes, ponds, glaciers > 1 km^{2} (0.386 sq mi or 247 acres) and river estuaries.

Saint-Cyr-du-Gault (French pronunciation: [sɛ̃ siʁ dy ɡo]) is a commune in the Loir-et-Cher department of central France.

== Population ==
Historical population
Year	Pop.	±% p.a.
1968	314	—
1975	275	−1.88%
1982	247	−1.52%
1990	208	−2.13%
1999	195	−0.71%
2007	182	−0.86%
2012	176	−0.67%
2017	174	−0.23%
2023	173	−0.10%
Source: INSEE

== See also ==
- Communes of the Loir-et-Cher department
