= Valaire =

- Commune
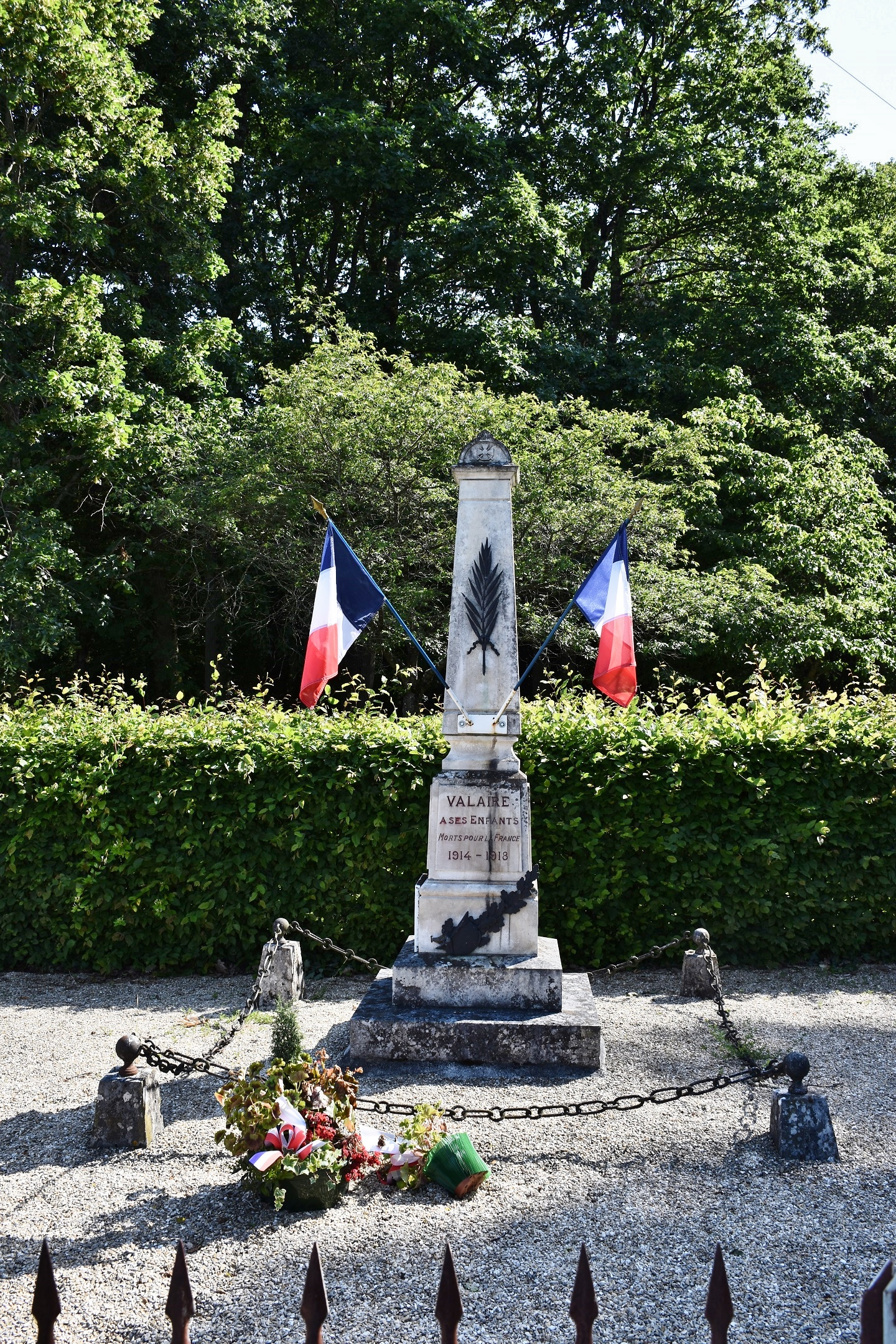
- War memorial in Valaire
- Location of Valaire
- Location within France Location within Centre-Val de Loire
- Coordinates: 47°28′14″N 1°16′10″E
- Country: France
- Region: Centre-Val de Loire
- Department: Loir-et-Cher
- Arrondissement: Blois
- Canton: Blois-3
- Intercommunality: CA Blois Agglopolys

Government
  - Mayor (2020–2026): Catherine Le Troquier
- Area^{1}: 6.68 km^{2} (2.58 sq mi)
- Elevation: 100 m (330 ft)
- Highest elevation: 109 m (358 ft)
- Lowest elevation: 62 m (203 ft)
- Population (2023): 85
  - Density: 13/km^{2} (33/sq mi)
- Time zone: UTC+01:00 (CET)
  - Summer (DST): UTC+02:00 (CEST)
- INSEE/Postal code: 41266 /41120
- ^{1} French Land Register data, which excludes lakes, ponds, glaciers > 1 km^{2} (0.386 sq mi or 247 acres) and river estuaries.

Valaire (French pronunciation: [valɛʁ]) is a commune of the Loir-et-Cher department in central France.

The Zen Temple La Gendronniere, founded by Taisen Deshimaru, occupies 80 hectares of land in the north-western part of the commune.

== Population ==
Historical population
Year	Pop.	±% p.a.
1968	88	—
1975	91	+0.48%
1982	86	−0.80%
1990	82	−0.59%
1999	87	+0.66%
2007	88	+0.14%
2012	72	−3.93%
2017	86	+3.62%
2023	85	−0.19%
Source: INSEE

== See also ==
- Communes of the Loir-et-Cher department
