= La Chapelle-Vendômoise =

- Commune
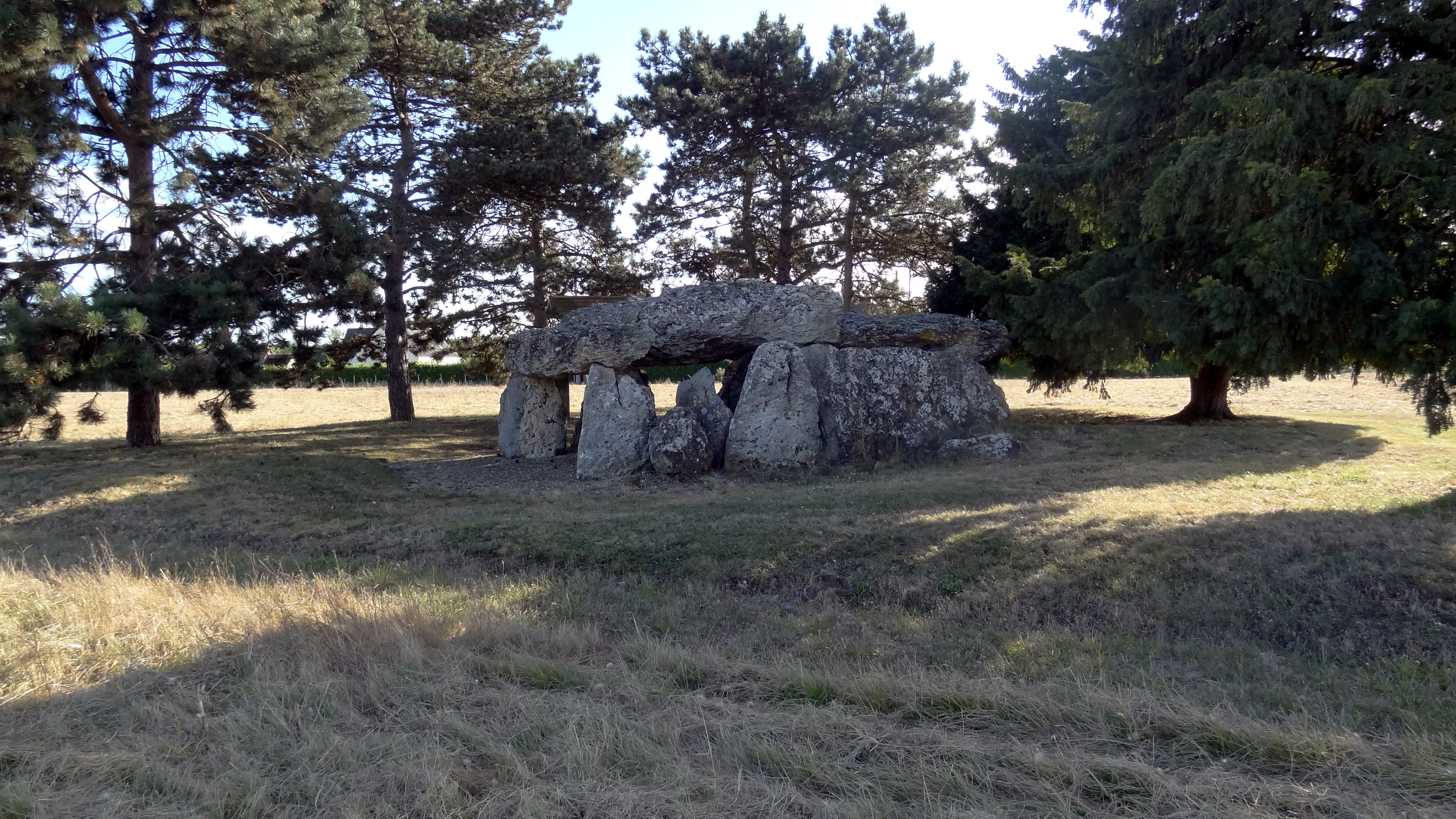
- Dolmen de la Pierre Levée
- Location of La Chapelle-Vendômoise
- Location within France Location within Centre-Val de Loire
- Coordinates: 47°40′18″N 1°14′24″E
- Country: France
- Region: Centre-Val de Loire
- Department: Loir-et-Cher
- Arrondissement: Blois
- Canton: Veuzain-sur-Loire
- Intercommunality: CA Blois Agglopolys

Government
  - Mayor (2020–2026): François Borde
- Area^{1}: 13.07 km^{2} (5.05 sq mi)
- Elevation: 117 m (384 ft)
- Highest elevation: 131 m (430 ft)
- Lowest elevation: 87 m (285 ft)
- Population (2023): 795
  - Density: 60.8/km^{2} (158/sq mi)
- Demonym(s): Capellovicien, Capellovicienne
- Time zone: UTC+01:00 (CET)
  - Summer (DST): UTC+02:00 (CEST)
- INSEE/Postal code: 41040 /41330
- ^{1} French Land Register data, which excludes lakes, ponds, glaciers > 1 km^{2} (0.386 sq mi or 247 acres) and river estuaries.

La Chapelle-Vendômoise (French pronunciation: [la ʃapɛl vɑ̃domwaz]) is a commune in the department of Loir-et-Cher, central France.

== Population ==
Historical population
Year	Pop.	±% p.a.
1968	421	—
1975	553	+3.97%
1982	623	+1.72%
1990	708	+1.61%
1999	744	+0.55%
2007	747	+0.05%
2012	715	−0.87%
2017	783	+1.83%
2023	795	+0.25%
Source: INSEE

== See also ==
- Communes of the Loir-et-Cher department
