= Champigny-en-Beauce =

- Commune
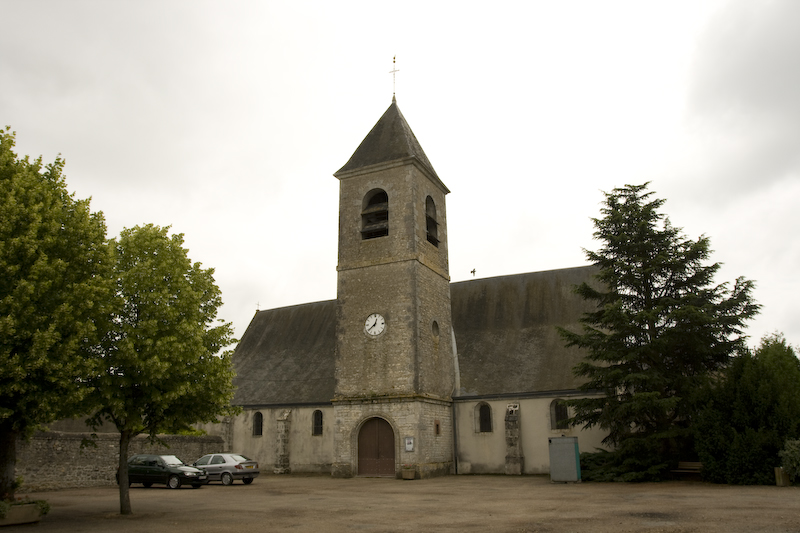
- Church of Saint-Félix
- Location of Champigny-en-Beauce
- Location within France Location within Centre-Val de Loire
- Coordinates: 47°42′46″N 1°15′24″E
- Country: France
- Region: Centre-Val de Loire
- Department: Loir-et-Cher
- Arrondissement: Blois
- Canton: Veuzain-sur-Loire
- Intercommunality: CA Blois Agglopolys

Government
  - Mayor (2020–2026): Christophe Redouin
- Area^{1}: 22.31 km^{2} (8.61 sq mi)
- Elevation: 119 m (390 ft)
- Highest elevation: 129 m (423 ft)
- Lowest elevation: 92 m (302 ft)
- Population (2023): 594
  - Density: 26.6/km^{2} (69.0/sq mi)
- Time zone: UTC+01:00 (CET)
  - Summer (DST): UTC+02:00 (CEST)
- INSEE/Postal code: 41035 /41330
- ^{1} French Land Register data, which excludes lakes, ponds, glaciers > 1 km^{2} (0.386 sq mi or 247 acres) and river estuaries.

Champigny-en-Beauce (French pronunciation: [ʃɑ̃piɲi ɑ̃ bos], literally Champigny in Beauce) is a commune in the Loir-et-Cher department in central France.

== Population ==
Historical population
Year	Pop.	±% p.a.
1968	462	—
1975	438	−0.76%
1982	472	+1.07%
1990	481	+0.24%
1999	553	+1.56%
2007	642	+1.88%
2012	613	−0.92%
2017	604	−0.30%
2023	594	−0.28%
Source: INSEE

== See also ==
- Communes of the Loir-et-Cher department
