= Saint-Bohaire =

- Commune
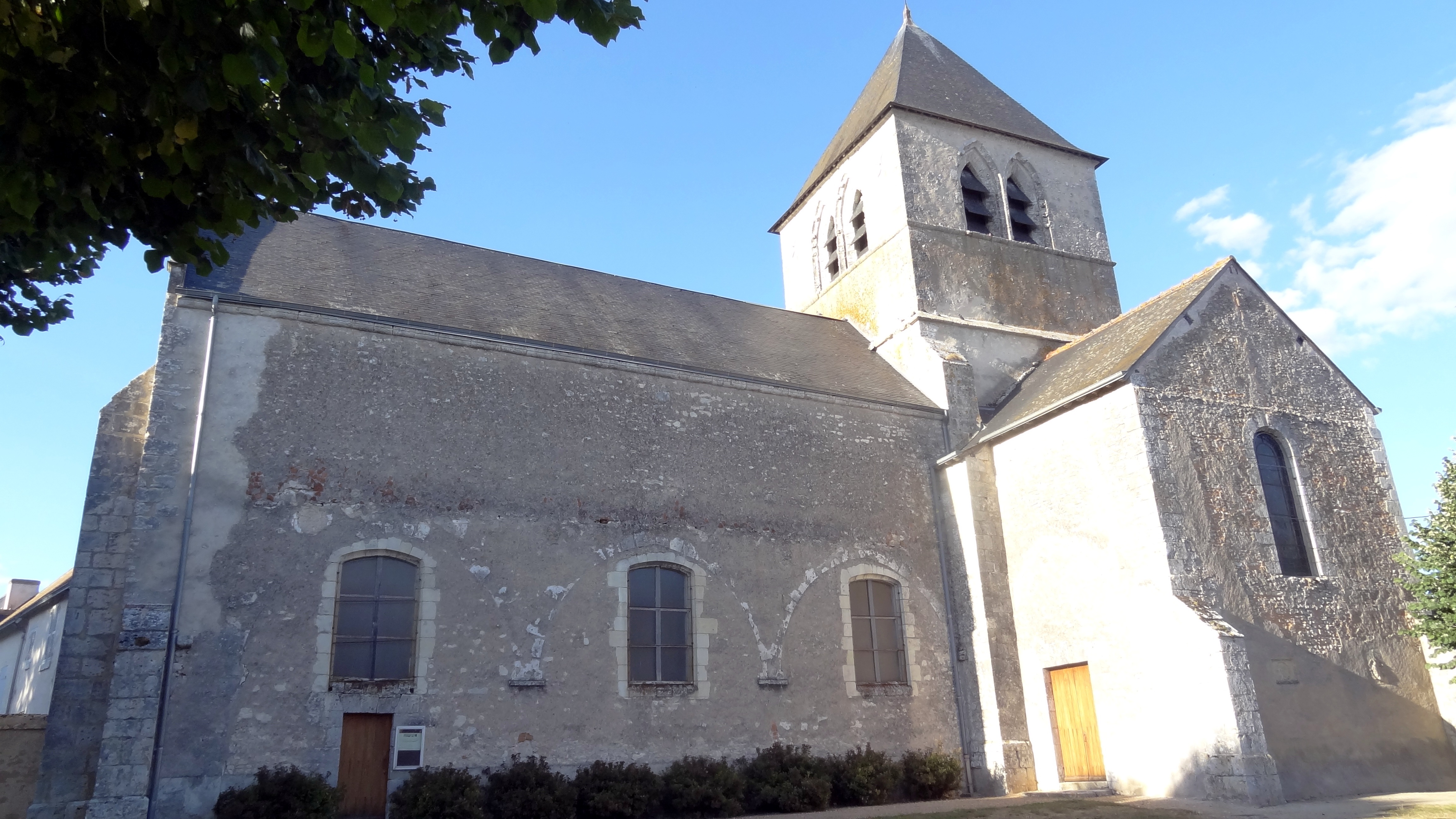
- Location of Saint-Bohaire
- Location within France Location within Centre-Val de Loire
- Coordinates: 47°38′43″N 1°15′51″E
- Country: France
- Region: Centre-Val de Loire
- Department: Loir-et-Cher
- Arrondissement: Blois
- Canton: Veuzain-sur-Loire
- Intercommunality: CA Blois Agglopolys

Government
  - Mayor (2020–2026): Bernard Pannequin
- Area^{1}: 14.06 km^{2} (5.43 sq mi)
- Elevation: 97 m (318 ft)
- Highest elevation: 123 m (404 ft)
- Lowest elevation: 85 m (279 ft)
- Population (2023): 500
  - Density: 36/km^{2} (92/sq mi)
- Time zone: UTC+01:00 (CET)
  - Summer (DST): UTC+02:00 (CEST)
- INSEE/Postal code: 41203 /41330
- ^{1} French Land Register data, which excludes lakes, ponds, glaciers > 1 km^{2} (0.386 sq mi or 247 acres) and river estuaries.

Saint-Bohaire (French pronunciation: [sɛ̃ bɔɛːʁ]) is a commune in the Loir-et-Cher department of central France.

== Population ==
Historical population
Year	Pop.	±% p.a.
1968	351	—
1975	372	+0.83%
1982	398	+0.97%
1990	395	−0.09%
1999	361	−1.00%
2007	329	−1.15%
2012	511	+9.21%
2017	497	−0.55%
2023	500	+0.10%
Source: INSEE

== See also ==
- Communes of the Loir-et-Cher department
