= Canton of Blois-3 =

Administrative district in central France

Coordinates: 47.57°N 1.33°E

The Canton of Blois-3 (French: canton de Blois-3) is an administrative division of the Loir-et-Cher department, central France. Its borders were modified at the French canton reorganisation which came into effect in March 2015. Its seat is in Blois.

It consists of the following communes:

1. Blois (partly)
2. Candé-sur-Beuvron
3. Chailles
4. Chaumont-sur-Loire
5. Le Controis-en-Sologne (partly)
6. Monthou-sur-Bièvre
7. Les Montils
8. Rilly-sur-Loire
9. Sambin
10. Seur
11. Valaire
