= Saint-Lubin-en-Vergonnois =

- Commune
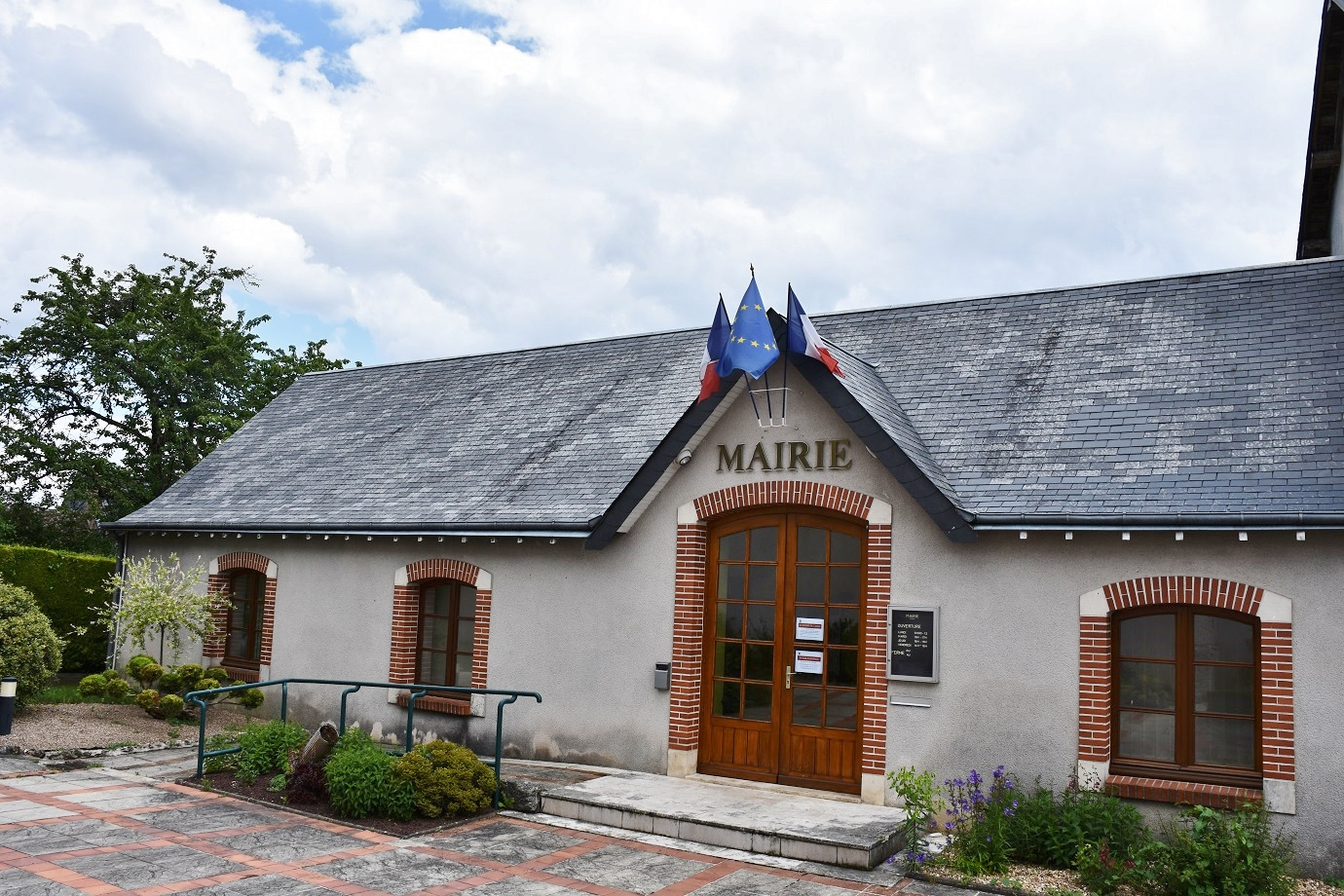
- Town hall

- Coat of arms
- Location of Saint-Lubin-en-Vergonnois
- Location within France Location within Centre-Val de Loire
- Coordinates: 47°36′50″N 1°14′19″E
- Country: France
- Region: Centre-Val de Loire
- Department: Loir-et-Cher
- Arrondissement: Blois
- Canton: Veuzain-sur-Loire
- Intercommunality: CA Blois Agglopolys

Government
  - Mayor (2020–2026): Henry Boussiquot
- Area^{1}: 17.06 km^{2} (6.59 sq mi)
- Elevation: 87 m (285 ft)
- Highest elevation: 132 m (433 ft)
- Lowest elevation: 80 m (260 ft)
- Population (2023): 774
  - Density: 45.4/km^{2} (118/sq mi)
- Demonym: Saint-Lubinois.e
- Time zone: UTC+01:00 (CET)
  - Summer (DST): UTC+02:00 (CEST)
- INSEE/Postal code: 41223 /41190
- ^{1} French Land Register data, which excludes lakes, ponds, glaciers > 1 km^{2} (0.386 sq mi or 247 acres) and river estuaries.

Saint-Lubin-en-Vergonnois (pronounced [sɛ̃ lybɛ̃ ɑ̃ vɛʁɡɔnwa]) is a commune in the department of Loir-et-Cher, central France.

== Population ==
Historical population
Year	Pop.	±% p.a.
1968	450	—
1975	518	+2.03%
1982	515	−0.08%
1990	804	+5.73%
1999	743	−0.87%
2007	692	−0.88%
2012	703	+0.32%
2017	718	+0.42%
2023	774	+1.26%
Source: INSEE

== See also ==
- Communes of the Loir-et-Cher department
