= Landes-le-Gaulois =

- Commune
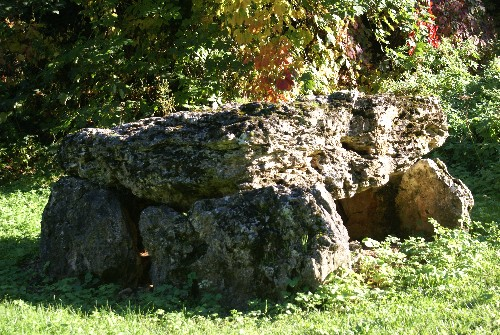
- Dolmen
- Location of Landes-le-Gaulois
- Location within France Location within Centre-Val de Loire
- Coordinates: 47°39′12″N 1°11′02″E
- Country: France
- Region: Centre-Val de Loire
- Department: Loir-et-Cher
- Arrondissement: Blois
- Canton: Veuzain-sur-Loire
- Intercommunality: CA Blois Agglopolys

Government
  - Mayor (2020–2026): Eric Peschard
- Area^{1}: 24.15 km^{2} (9.32 sq mi)
- Elevation: 105 m (344 ft)
- Highest elevation: 128 m (420 ft)
- Lowest elevation: 97 m (318 ft)
- Population (2023): 721
  - Density: 29.9/km^{2} (77.3/sq mi)
- Time zone: UTC+01:00 (CET)
  - Summer (DST): UTC+02:00 (CEST)
- INSEE/Postal code: 41109 /41190
- ^{1} French Land Register data, which excludes lakes, ponds, glaciers > 1 km^{2} (0.386 sq mi or 247 acres) and river estuaries.

Landes-le-Gaulois (French pronunciation: [lɑ̃d lə ɡolwa]) is a commune in the Loir-et-Cher department of central France.

== Population ==
Historical population
Year	Pop.	±% p.a.
1968	596	—
1975	586	−0.24%
1982	568	−0.44%
1990	589	+0.45%
1999	582	−0.13%
2007	657	+1.53%
2012	724	+1.96%
2017	750	+0.71%
2023	721	−0.66%
Source: INSEE

== See also ==
- Communes of the Loir-et-Cher department
