= Veuzain-sur-Loire =

- Commune
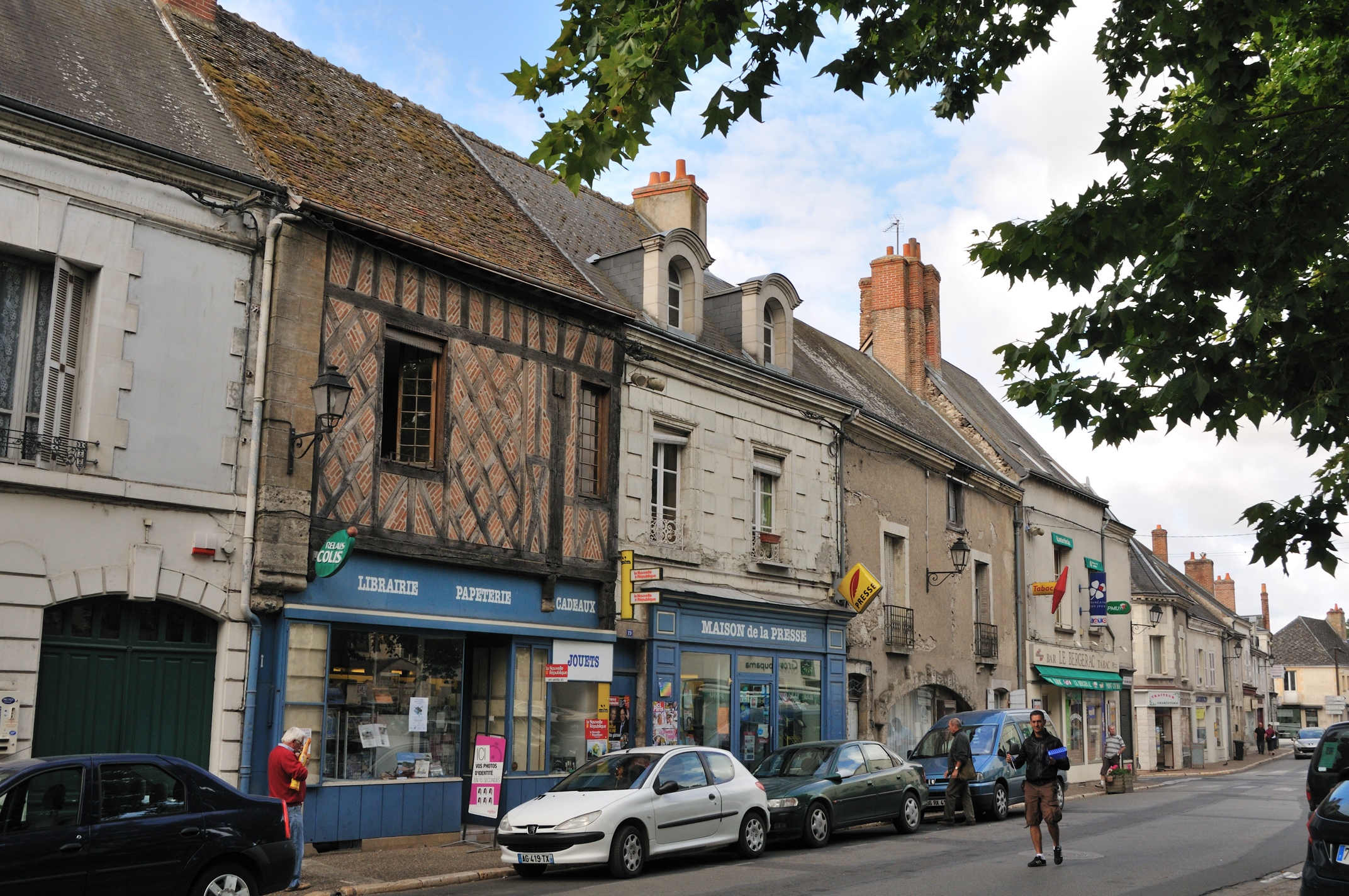
- Location of Veuzain-sur-Loire
- Location within France Location within Centre-Val de Loire
- Coordinates: 47°30′00″N 1°10′30″E
- Country: France
- Region: Centre-Val de Loire
- Department: Loir-et-Cher
- Arrondissement: Blois
- Canton: Veuzain-sur-Loire
- Intercommunality: CA Blois Agglopolys

Government
  - Mayor (2020–2026): Pierre Olaya
- Area^{1}: 37.96 km^{2} (14.66 sq mi)
- Highest elevation: 119 m (390 ft)
- Lowest elevation: 41 m (135 ft)
- Population (2023): 3,333
  - Density: 87.80/km^{2} (227.4/sq mi)
- Demonym: Veuzainois·e
- Time zone: UTC+01:00 (CET)
  - Summer (DST): UTC+02:00 (CEST)
- INSEE/Postal code: 41167 /41150
- ^{1} French Land Register data, which excludes lakes, ponds, glaciers > 1 km^{2} (0.386 sq mi or 247 acres) and river estuaries.

Veuzain-sur-Loire (French pronunciation: [vøzɛ̃ syʁ lwaʁ]), commonly known as Veuzain, is a commune in the French department of Loir-et-Cher, administrative region of Centre-Val de Loire. The municipality was established on 1 January 2017 by merger of the former communes of Onzain (the seat) and Veuves.

Veuzain is located about 12.8 miles (20.7 kilometres) southwest of Blois. Onzain station has rail connections to Orléans, Blois and Tours.

== Population ==
Population data refer to the commune in its geography as of January 2025.

Historical population
Year	Pop.	±% p.a.
1968	2,917	—
1975	2,962	+0.22%
1982	3,138	+0.83%
1990	3,295	+0.61%
1999	3,357	+0.21%
2007	3,631	+0.99%
2012	3,691	+0.33%
2017	3,503	−1.04%
2023	3,333	−0.83%
Source: INSEE

== See also ==
- Communes of the Loir-et-Cher department
