= Fossé, Loir-et-Cher =

Fossé
- Commune
- Location of Fossé
- Location within France Location within Centre-Val de Loire
- Coordinates: 47°38′03″N 1°17′06″E
- Country: France
- Region: Centre-Val de Loire
- Department: Loir-et-Cher
- Arrondissement: Blois
- Canton: Veuzain-sur-Loire
- Intercommunality: CA Blois Agglopolys

Government
  - Mayor (2020–2026): Valéry Lange
- Area^{1}: 10.2 km^{2} (3.9 sq mi)
- Elevation: 113 m (371 ft)
- Highest elevation: 120 m (390 ft)
- Lowest elevation: 85 m (279 ft)
- Population (2023): 1,254
  - Density: 123/km^{2} (318/sq mi)
- Time zone: UTC+01:00 (CET)
  - Summer (DST): UTC+02:00 (CEST)
- INSEE/Postal code: 41091 /41330
- ^{1} French Land Register data, which excludes lakes, ponds, glaciers > 1 km^{2} (0.386 sq mi or 247 acres) and river estuaries.

Fossé (French pronunciation: [fose]) is a commune in the Loir-et-Cher department of central France.

== Population ==
Historical population
Year	Pop.	±% p.a.
1968	329	—
1975	580	+8.44%
1982	781	+4.34%
1990	862	+1.24%
1999	849	−0.17%
2007	986	+1.89%
2012	1,290	+5.52%
2017	1,308	+0.28%
2023	1,254	−0.70%
Source: INSEE

== See also ==
- Communes of the Loir-et-Cher department
