= Marolles, Loir-et-Cher =

Marolles
- Commune
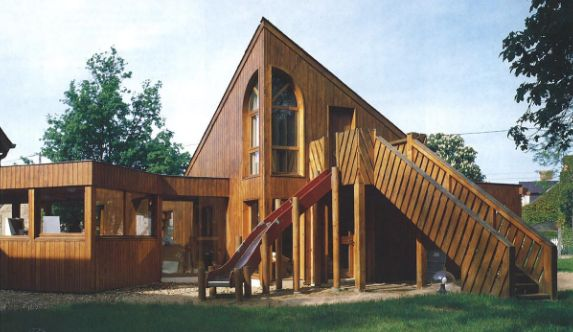
- École maternelle of Marolles
- Location of Marolles
- Location within France Location within Centre-Val de Loire
- Coordinates: 47°38′55″N 1°18′28″E
- Country: France
- Region: Centre-Val de Loire
- Department: Loir-et-Cher
- Arrondissement: Blois
- Canton: Veuzain-sur-Loire
- Intercommunality: CA Blois Agglopolys

Government
  - Mayor (2020–2026): Isabelle Soirat
- Area^{1}: 9.88 km^{2} (3.81 sq mi)
- Elevation: 144 m (472 ft)
- Highest elevation: 117 m (384 ft)
- Lowest elevation: 87 m (285 ft)
- Population (2023): 714
  - Density: 72.3/km^{2} (187/sq mi)
- Time zone: UTC+01:00 (CET)
  - Summer (DST): UTC+02:00 (CEST)
- INSEE/Postal code: 41128 /41330
- ^{1} French Land Register data, which excludes lakes, ponds, glaciers > 1 km^{2} (0.386 sq mi or 247 acres) and river estuaries.

Marolles (French pronunciation: [maʁɔl]) is a commune in Loir-et-Cher, central France.

== Population ==
Historical population
Year	Pop.	±% p.a.
1968	460	—
1975	557	+2.77%
1982	681	+2.91%
1990	708	+0.49%
1999	715	+0.11%
2007	694	−0.37%
2012	747	+1.48%
2017	725	−0.60%
2023	714	−0.25%
Source: INSEE

== See also ==
- Communes of the Loir-et-Cher department
