= Saint-Sulpice-de-Pommeray =

- Commune
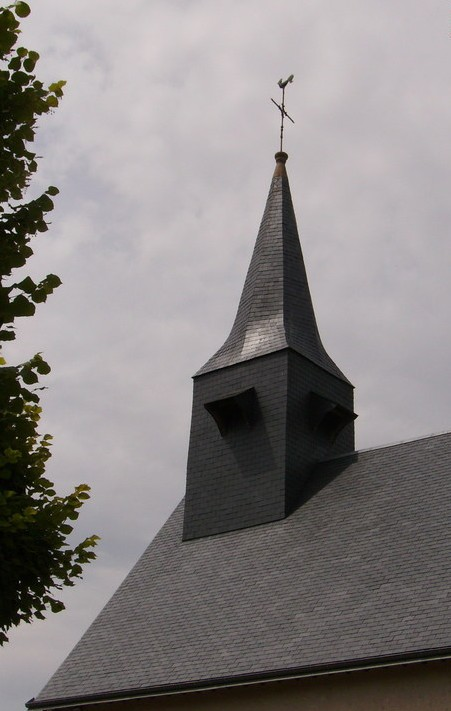
- Bell tower of the church
- Location of Saint-Sulpice-de-Pommeray
- Location within France Location within Centre-Val de Loire
- Coordinates: 47°36′31″N 1°16′12″E
- Country: France
- Region: Centre-Val de Loire
- Department: Loir-et-Cher
- Arrondissement: Blois
- Canton: Veuzain-sur-Loire
- Intercommunality: CA Blois Agglopolys

Government
  - Mayor (2022–2026): Denis Lesieur
- Area^{1}: 11.5 km^{2} (4.4 sq mi)
- Elevation: 116 m (381 ft)
- Highest elevation: 144 m (472 ft)
- Lowest elevation: 80 m (260 ft)
- Population (2023): 1,829
  - Density: 159/km^{2} (412/sq mi)
- Time zone: UTC+01:00 (CET)
  - Summer (DST): UTC+02:00 (CEST)
- INSEE/Postal code: 41230 /41000
- ^{1} French Land Register data, which excludes lakes, ponds, glaciers > 1 km^{2} (0.386 sq mi or 247 acres) and river estuaries.

Saint-Sulpice-de-Pommeray (French pronunciation: [sɛ̃ sylpis də pɔmʁɛ], before 2002: Saint-Sulpice) is a commune in the Loir-et-Cher department of central France.

== Population ==
Historical population
| Year | Pop. | ±% p.a. |
|---|---|---|
| 1968 | 443 | — |
| 1975 | 989 | +12.16% |
| 1982 | 1,308 | +4.07% |
| 1990 | 1,452 | +1.31% |
| 1999 | 1,876 | +2.89% |
| 2007 | 1,802 | −0.50% |
| 2012 | 1,826 | +0.26% |
| 2017 | 1,855 | +0.32% |
| 2023 | 1,829 | −0.23% |
Source: INSEE

== See also ==
- Communes of the Loir-et-Cher department
