= Monteaux =

- Commune
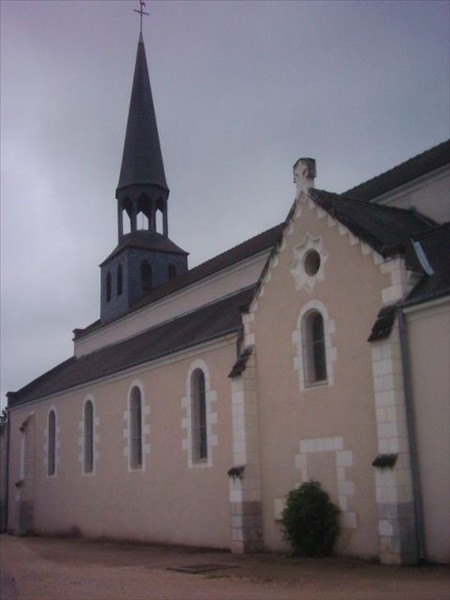

- Coat of arms
- Location of Monteaux
- Location within France Location within Centre-Val de Loire
- Coordinates: 47°29′12″N 1°06′51″E
- Country: France
- Region: Centre-Val de Loire
- Department: Loir-et-Cher
- Arrondissement: Blois
- Canton: Veuzain-sur-Loire
- Intercommunality: CA Blois Agglopolys

Government
  - Mayor (2020–2026): Philippe Dambrine
- Area^{1}: 6.27 km^{2} (2.42 sq mi)
- Elevation: 58 m (190 ft)
- Highest elevation: 102 m (335 ft)
- Lowest elevation: 56 m (184 ft)
- Population (2023): 729
  - Density: 116/km^{2} (301/sq mi)
- Time zone: UTC+01:00 (CET)
  - Summer (DST): UTC+02:00 (CEST)
- INSEE/Postal code: 41144 /41150
- ^{1} French Land Register data, which excludes lakes, ponds, glaciers > 1 km^{2} (0.386 sq mi or 247 acres) and river estuaries.

Monteaux (French pronunciation: [mɔ̃to]) is a commune in the Loir-et-Cher department of central France.

== Population ==
Historical population
Year	Pop.	±% p.a.
1968	526	—
1975	535	+0.24%
1982	588	+1.36%
1990	630	+0.87%
1999	661	+0.54%
2007	747	+1.54%
2012	785	+1.00%
2017	768	−0.44%
2023	729	−0.86%
Source: INSEE

== See also ==
- Communes of the Loir-et-Cher department
