= Villefrancœur =

Villefrancoeur
- Commune
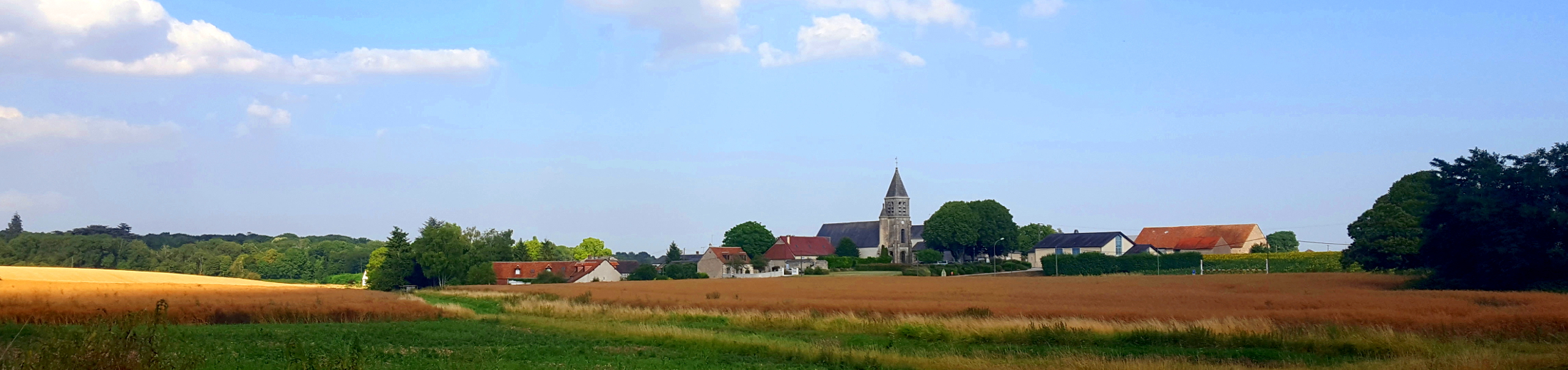

- Coat of arms
- Location of Villefrancoeur
- Location within France Location within Centre-Val de Loire
- Coordinates: 47°41′40″N 1°13′12″E
- Country: France
- Region: Centre-Val de Loire
- Department: Loir-et-Cher
- Arrondissement: Blois
- Canton: Veuzain-sur-Loire
- Intercommunality: CA Blois Agglopolys

Government
  - Mayor (2020–2026): Pierre Montaru
- Area^{1}: 18.08 km^{2} (6.98 sq mi)
- Elevation: 122 m (400 ft)
- Highest elevation: 127 m (417 ft)
- Lowest elevation: 105 m (344 ft)
- Population (2023): 416
  - Density: 23.0/km^{2} (59.6/sq mi)
- Time zone: UTC+01:00 (CET)
  - Summer (DST): UTC+02:00 (CEST)
- INSEE/Postal code: 41281 /41330
- ^{1} French Land Register data, which excludes lakes, ponds, glaciers > 1 km^{2} (0.386 sq mi or 247 acres) and river estuaries.

Villefrancœur (French pronunciation: [vilfʁɑ̃kœʁ]) is a commune in the Loir-et-Cher department in central France.

== Population ==
Historical population
Year	Pop.	±% p.a.
1968	355	—
1975	350	−0.20%
1982	411	+2.32%
1990	461	+1.45%
1999	462	+0.02%
2007	472	+0.27%
2012	451	−0.91%
2017	424	−1.23%
2023	416	−0.32%
Source: INSEE

== See also ==
- Communes of the Loir-et-Cher department
