= Françay =

- Commune
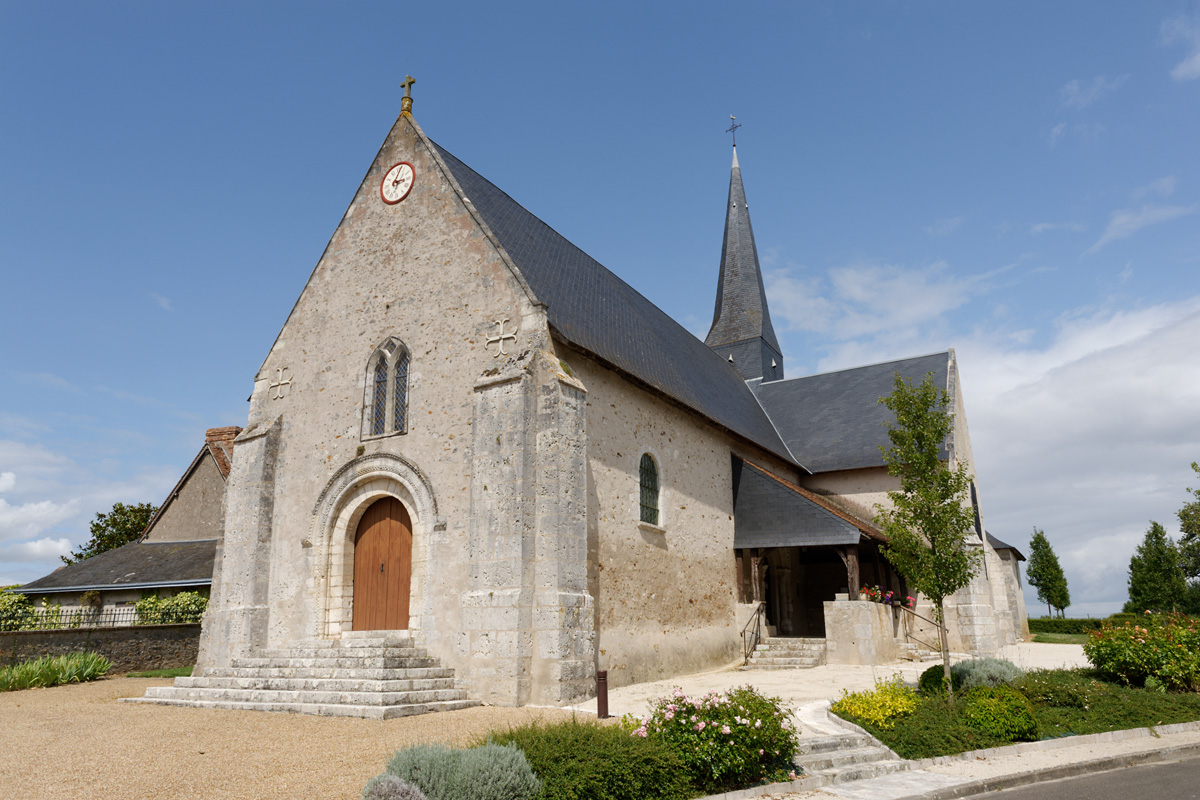
- Location of Françay
- Location within France Location within Centre-Val de Loire
- Coordinates: 47°37′07″N 1°07′36″E
- Country: France
- Region: Centre-Val de Loire
- Department: Loir-et-Cher
- Arrondissement: Blois
- Canton: Veuzain-sur-Loire
- Intercommunality: CA Blois Agglopolys

Government
  - Mayor (2020–2026): Viviane Dabin
- Area^{1}: 20.31 km^{2} (7.84 sq mi)
- Elevation: 113 m (371 ft)
- Highest elevation: 134 m (440 ft)
- Lowest elevation: 107 m (351 ft)
- Population (2023): 271
  - Density: 13.3/km^{2} (34.6/sq mi)
- Time zone: UTC+01:00 (CET)
  - Summer (DST): UTC+02:00 (CEST)
- INSEE/Postal code: 41093 /41190
- ^{1} French Land Register data, which excludes lakes, ponds, glaciers > 1 km^{2} (0.386 sq mi or 247 acres) and river estuaries.

Françay (French pronunciation: [fʁɑ̃sɛ]) is a commune in the Loir-et-Cher department of central France.

== Population ==
Historical population
Year	Pop.	±% p.a.
1968	276	—
1975	221	−3.12%
1982	222	+0.06%
1990	227	+0.28%
1999	231	+0.19%
2007	286	+2.71%
2012	291	+0.35%
2017	273	−1.27%
2023	271	−0.12%
Source: INSEE

== See also ==
- Communes of the Loir-et-Cher department
