= Rilly-sur-Loire =

- Commune
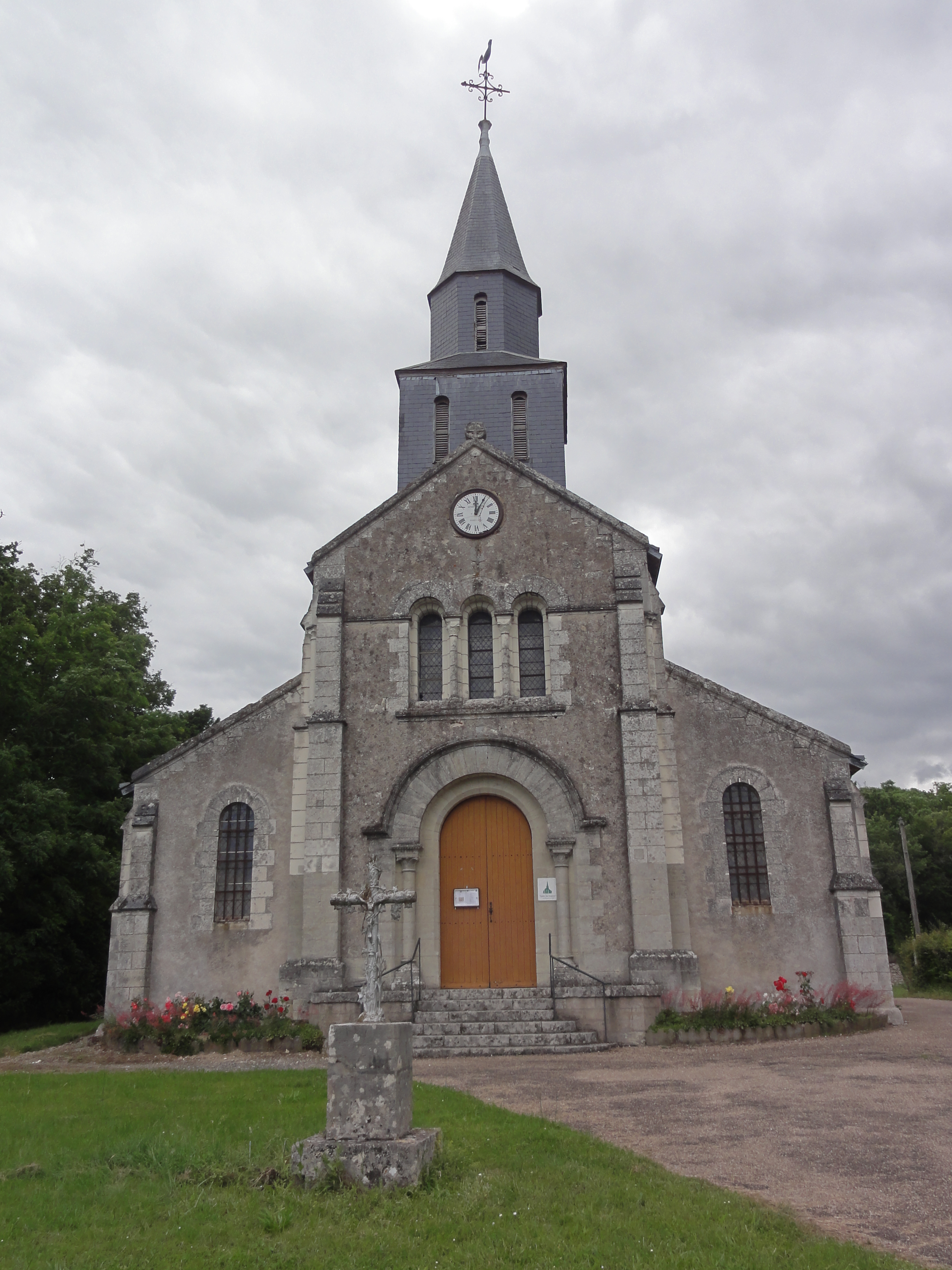
- Location of Rilly-sur-Loire
- Location within France Location within Centre-Val de Loire
- Coordinates: 47°28′00″N 1°08′08″E
- Country: France
- Region: Centre-Val de Loire
- Department: Loir-et-Cher
- Arrondissement: Blois
- Canton: Blois-3
- Intercommunality: CA Blois Agglopolys

Government
  - Mayor (2020–2026): Maryse Moresve
- Area^{1}: 10.22 km^{2} (3.95 sq mi)
- Elevation: 65 m (213 ft)
- Highest elevation: 109 m (358 ft)
- Lowest elevation: 58 m (190 ft)
- Population (2023): 445
  - Density: 43.5/km^{2} (113/sq mi)
- Time zone: UTC+01:00 (CET)
  - Summer (DST): UTC+02:00 (CEST)
- INSEE/Postal code: 41189 /41150
- ^{1} French Land Register data, which excludes lakes, ponds, glaciers > 1 km^{2} (0.386 sq mi or 247 acres) and river estuaries.

Rilly-sur-Loire (French pronunciation: [ʁiji syʁ lwaʁ], literally Rilly on Loire) is a commune in the Loir-et-Cher department in central France.

== Population ==
Historical population
Year	Pop.	±% p.a.
1968	354	—
1975	313	−1.74%
1982	297	−0.75%
1990	321	+0.98%
1999	404	+2.59%
2007	441	+1.10%
2012	457	+0.72%
2017	474	+0.73%
2023	445	−1.05%
Source: INSEE

== See also ==
- Communes of the Loir-et-Cher department
