= Flein =

- Municipality
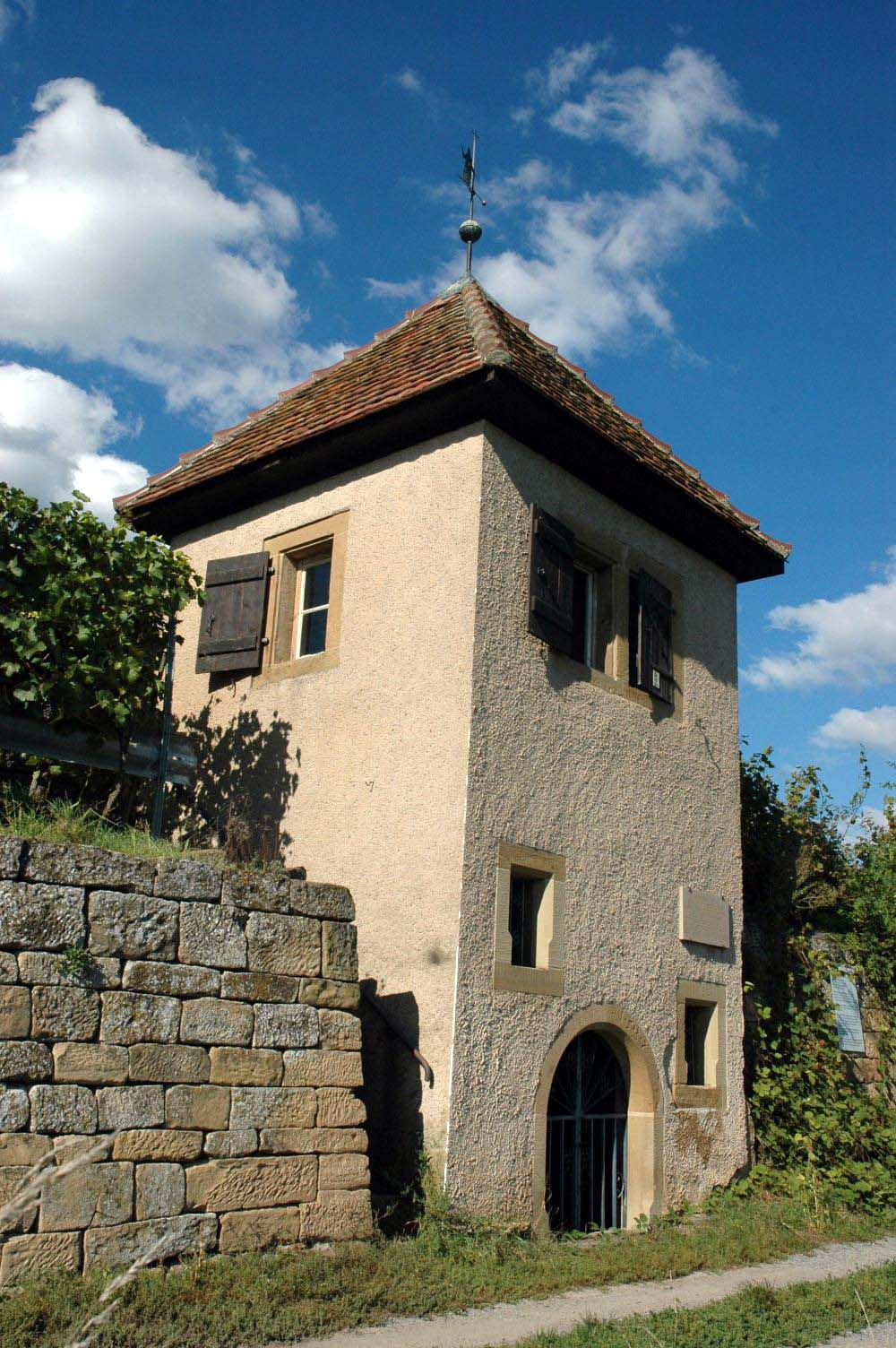

- Coat of arms

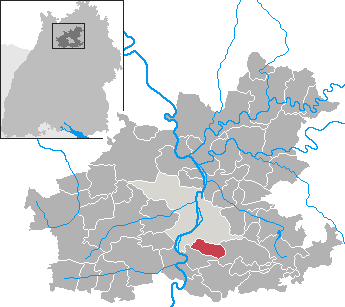
- Location of Flein within Heilbronn district
- Interactive map of Flein
- Location within Germany Location within Baden-Württemberg
- Coordinates: 49°6′N 9°13′E
- Country: Germany
- State: Baden-Württemberg
- Admin. region: Stuttgart
- District: Heilbronn

Government
  - Mayor (2023–31): Alexander Krüger

Area
  - Total: 8.47 km^{2} (3.27 sq mi)
- Elevation: 212 m (696 ft)

Population (2025-12-31)
  - Total: 7,422
  - Density: 876/km^{2} (2,270/sq mi)
- Time zone: UTC+01:00 (CET)
  - Summer (DST): UTC+02:00 (CEST)
- Postal codes: 74223
- Dialling codes: 07131
- Vehicle registration: HN
- Website: www.flein.de

Flein (German: [flaɪn]) is a municipality in the district of Heilbronn in Baden-Württemberg in southern Germany.

== Geography ==
Flein is situated in the south of the district of Heilbronn and directly borders on to Heilbronn in the south.

=== Neighbouring municipalities ===
Neighbouring towns and municipalities of Flein are (clockwise from north-west): Heilbronn (Stadtkreis), Untergruppenbach and Talheim (both in the district of Heilbronn). Flein has combined with Talheim to form a joint association of administrations.

== Population ==
- 1648: 250
- 1800: 800
- 1900: 1,600
- 2005: 6,535

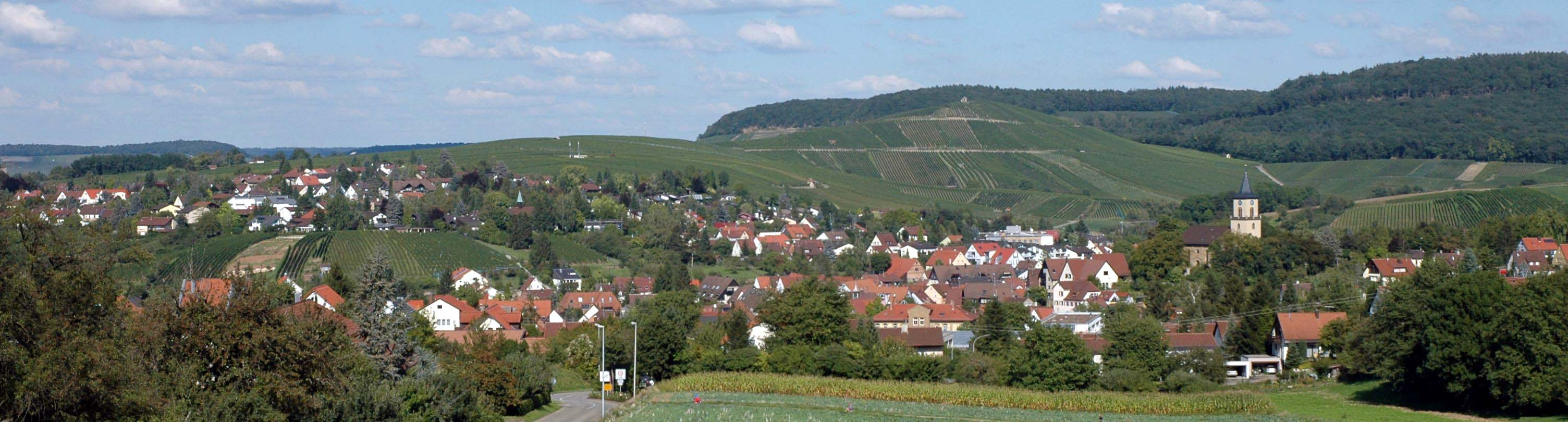

== Politics ==
=== District council ===
Elections in 2014:

- Free voters: 8 seats
- CDU/Bürgerliste: 5 seats
- SPD: 5 seats

No difference to year 2009.

The mayor is also a member of the district council and its chairman.

=== Mayor ===
On June 24, 2007, there were mayoral elections; the incumbent, Jürgen Schmid did not stand for re-election after 16 years in office. Since there was no absolute majority after the first election a run off was necessary. On July 15, 2007. Alexander Krüger was elected as mayor for an eight-year term with 63.9% of the votes. He started on August 15, 2007.

=== Coat of arms and flag ===
The colours of the coats of arms were laid down in 1938 by the head archive of Württemberg. In the same year, the Nazi NSDAP party Heilbronn suggested to accept another arms without a religious meaning. The archive direction suggested a blazon containing an arms In a split sign in blue a head of a lion, behind in gold a blue grape with two vine leaves. However, in June 1939 the NSDAP stated that it was of minor importance and not to hurry the change. So Flein remained with its previous coat of arms and confirmed this decision in 1956. This decision was confirmed on January 11, 1957, by the ministry of the interior of Baden-Württemberg. In the same year local artist Hans Epple created a drawing used by the municipality today (see illustration).

=== Twin municipalities ===
Twin municipalities of Flein are

- Onzain in the French Département Loir-et-Cher (since March 1990)
- Steinthaleben in the Kyffhäuserkreis in Thuringia (since June 1991)
