= Averdon =

- Commune
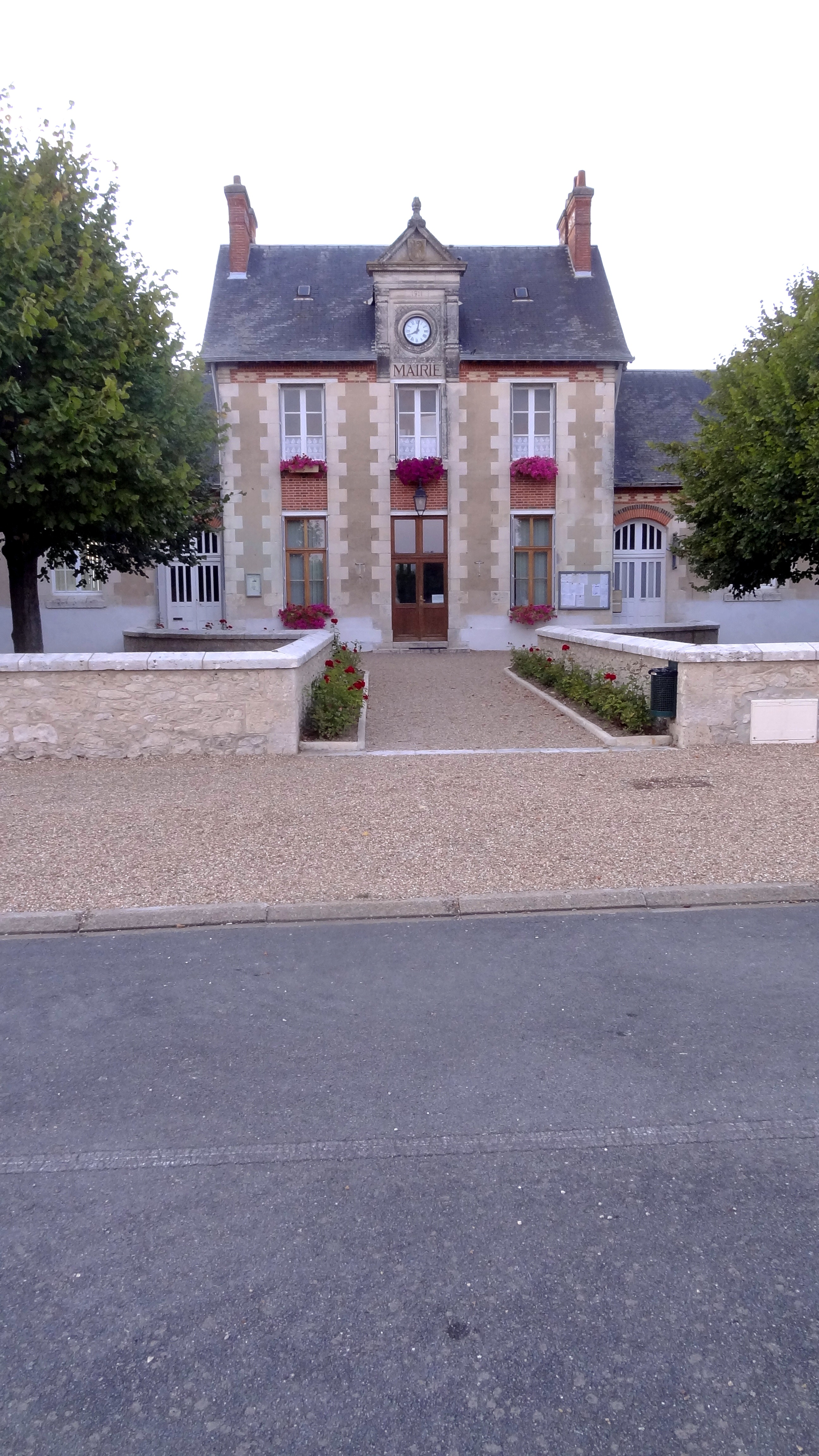
- Town hall
- Location of Averdon
- Location within France Location within Centre-Val de Loire
- Coordinates: 47°41′06″N 1°17′46″E
- Country: France
- Region: Centre-Val de Loire
- Department: Loir-et-Cher
- Arrondissement: Blois
- Canton: Veuzain-sur-Loire
- Intercommunality: CA Blois Agglopolys

Government
  - Mayor (2020–2026): Didier Moelo
- Area^{1}: 29.14 km^{2} (11.25 sq mi)
- Elevation: 110 m (360 ft)
- Highest elevation: 131 m (430 ft)
- Lowest elevation: 87 m (285 ft)
- Population (2023): 677
  - Density: 23.2/km^{2} (60.2/sq mi)
- Time zone: UTC+01:00 (CET)
  - Summer (DST): UTC+02:00 (CEST)
- INSEE/Postal code: 41009 /41330
- ^{1} French Land Register data, which excludes lakes, ponds, glaciers > 1 km^{2} (0.386 sq mi or 247 acres) and river estuaries.

Averdon (French pronunciation: [avɛʁdɔ̃]) is a commune in the Loir-et-Cher department in central France.

Located in the center-west of the department, the town is part of the small agricultural region "la Beauce", a vast expanse of cereal crops, oilseeds (rapeseed) and protein crops (peas, horse beans, lupins), with also sugar beet, and potato. It is drained by the Cisse and by two small streams.

Land use is marked by the importance of agricultural and natural spaces which occupy almost all of the municipal territory. Several natural areas of interest are present in the town: a protected area, two natura 2000 sites, three natural areas of ecological, faunal and floristic interest (ZNIEFF) and a sensitive natural area, In 2010, the technical and economic orientation agriculture in the town is the cultivation of cereals and oilseeds. Like the department, which has seen a quarter of its farms disappear in ten years, the number of farms has fallen sharply, from 32 in 1988, to 25 in 2000, then to 21 in 2010.

The architectural heritage of the town includes various buildings included in the inventory of historical monuments: the church of Saint-Lubin d'Averdon, listed in 1947, the prehistoric necropolis of Grande-Mesle, listed in 1975 and the menhir of the Grande Pierre, classified in 1979.

== Population ==
Historical population
Year	Pop.	±% p.a.
1968	348	—
1975	427	+2.97%
1982	605	+5.10%
1990	631	+0.53%
1999	643	+0.21%
2007	705	+1.16%
2012	713	+0.23%
2017	697	−0.45%
2023	677	−0.48%
Source: INSEE

== See also ==
- Communes of the Loir-et-Cher department
