= Mesland =

- Commune
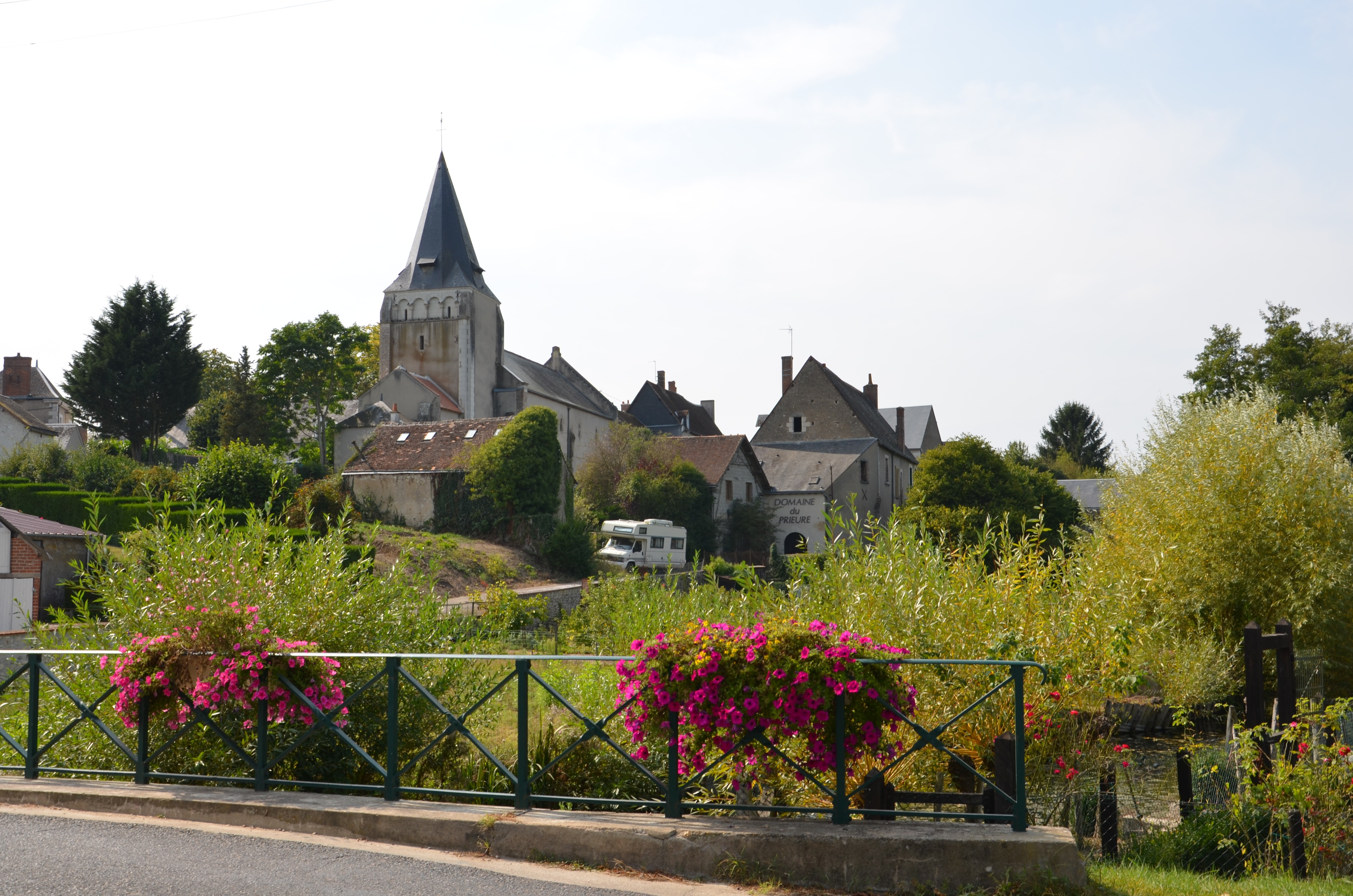

- Coat of arms
- Location of Mesland
- Location within France Location within Centre-Val de Loire
- Coordinates: 47°30′37″N 1°07′24″E
- Country: France
- Region: Centre-Val de Loire
- Department: Loir-et-Cher
- Arrondissement: Blois
- Canton: Veuzain-sur-Loire
- Intercommunality: CA Blois Agglopolys

Government
  - Mayor (2020–2026): Philippe Guettard
- Area^{1}: 26.38 km^{2} (10.19 sq mi)
- Elevation: 69 m (226 ft)
- Highest elevation: 116 m (381 ft)
- Lowest elevation: 62 m (203 ft)
- Population (2023): 539
  - Density: 20.4/km^{2} (52.9/sq mi)
- Time zone: UTC+01:00 (CET)
  - Summer (DST): UTC+02:00 (CEST)
- INSEE/Postal code: 41137 /41150
- ^{1} French Land Register data, which excludes lakes, ponds, glaciers > 1 km^{2} (0.386 sq mi or 247 acres) and river estuaries.

Mesland (French pronunciation: [mɛlɑ̃]) is a commune in the Loir-et-Cher department of central France.

== Population ==
Historical population
Year	Pop.	±% p.a.
1968	605	—
1975	540	−1.61%
1982	478	−1.73%
1990	483	+0.13%
1999	528	+0.99%
2007	540	+0.28%
2012	570	+1.09%
2017	565	−0.18%
2023	539	−0.78%
Source: INSEE

== See also ==
- Communes of the Loir-et-Cher department
