= Saint-Étienne-des-Guérets =

- Commune
- Location of Saint-Étienne-des-Guérets
- Location within France Location within Centre-Val de Loire
- Coordinates: 47°36′00″N 1°03′54″E
- Country: France
- Region: Centre-Val de Loire
- Department: Loir-et-Cher
- Arrondissement: Blois
- Canton: Veuzain-sur-Loire
- Intercommunality: CA Blois Agglopolys

Government
  - Mayor (2020–2026): Alain Vée
- Area^{1}: 11.72 km^{2} (4.53 sq mi)
- Elevation: 130 m (430 ft)
- Highest elevation: 148 m (486 ft)
- Lowest elevation: 122 m (400 ft)
- Population (2023): 115
  - Density: 9.81/km^{2} (25.4/sq mi)
- Time zone: UTC+01:00 (CET)
  - Summer (DST): UTC+02:00 (CEST)
- INSEE/Postal code: 41208 /41190
- ^{1} French Land Register data, which excludes lakes, ponds, glaciers > 1 km^{2} (0.386 sq mi or 247 acres) and river estuaries.

Saint-Étienne-des-Guérets (French pronunciation: [sɛ̃.t‿etjɛn de ɡeʁɛ]) is a commune in the Loir-et-Cher department of central France.

== Population ==
Historical population
Year	Pop.	±% p.a.
1968	137	—
1975	111	−2.96%
1982	106	−0.66%
1990	99	−0.85%
1999	98	−0.11%
2007	99	+0.13%
2012	91	−1.67%
2017	111	+4.05%
2023	115	+0.59%
Source: INSEE

== See also ==
- Communes of the Loir-et-Cher department
