= Seur =

- Commune
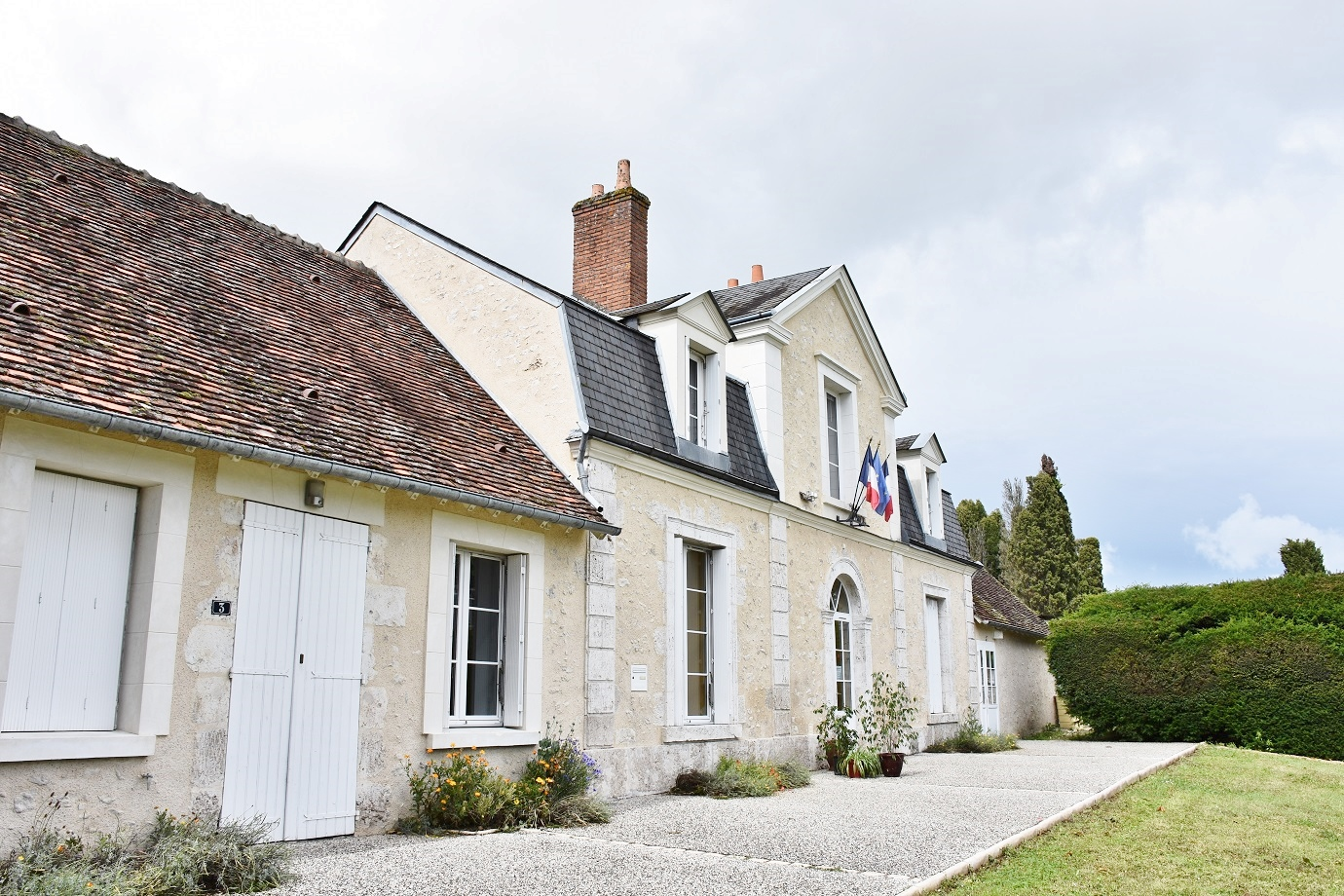
- Town hall in Seur
- Location of Seur
- Location within France Location within Centre-Val de Loire
- Coordinates: 47°30′13″N 1°20′04″E
- Country: France
- Region: Centre-Val de Loire
- Department: Loir-et-Cher
- Arrondissement: Blois
- Canton: Blois-3
- Intercommunality: CA Blois Agglopolys

Government
  - Mayor (2020–2026): Yves Barrois
- Area^{1}: 3.85 km^{2} (1.49 sq mi)
- Elevation: 80 m (260 ft)
- Highest elevation: 106 m (348 ft)
- Lowest elevation: 67 m (220 ft)
- Population (2023): 479
  - Density: 124/km^{2} (322/sq mi)
- Time zone: UTC+01:00 (CET)
  - Summer (DST): UTC+02:00 (CEST)
- INSEE/Postal code: 41246 /41120
- ^{1} French Land Register data, which excludes lakes, ponds, glaciers > 1 km^{2} (0.386 sq mi or 247 acres) and river estuaries.

Seur (French pronunciation: [sœʁ]) is a commune in the Loir-et-Cher department in central France.

== Population ==
Historical population
Year	Pop.	±% p.a.
1968	193	—
1975	206	+0.94%
1982	231	+1.65%
1990	302	+3.41%
1999	355	+1.81%
2007	457	+3.21%
2012	471	+0.61%
2017	477	+0.25%
2023	479	+0.07%
Source: INSEE

== See also ==
- Communes of the Loir-et-Cher department
