= Communauté d'agglomération de Blois Agglopolys =

Blois Agglopolys
- Communauté d'agglomération
- Interactive map of Blois Agglopolys
- Coordinates: 47°36′N 01°20′E
- Country: France
- Region: Centre-Val de Loire
- Department: Loir-et-Cher
- No. of communes: {{{nbcomm}}}
- Established: 2012
- Area: 792.2 km^{2} (305.9 sq mi)
- Population (2017): 105,635
  - Density: 133.3/km^{2} (345.4/sq mi)
- Website: www.agglopolys.fr

Communauté d'agglomération de Blois Agglopolys is an intercommunal structure, centred on the city of Blois. It is located in the Loir-et-Cher department, in the Centre-Val de Loire region, central France. It was created in January 2012. Its seat is in Blois. Its population was 105,635 in 2017, of which 46,086 in Blois proper.

== Composition ==
The communauté d'agglomération consists of the following 43 communes:

1. Averdon
2. Blois
3. Candé-sur-Beuvron
4. Cellettes
5. Chailles
6. Champigny-en-Beauce
7. La Chapelle-Vendômoise
8. Chaumont-sur-Loire
9. La Chaussée-Saint-Victor
10. Cheverny
11. Chitenay
12. Cormeray
13. Cour-Cheverny
14. Fossé
15. Françay
16. Herbault
17. Lancôme
18. Landes-le-Gaulois
19. Marolles
20. Menars
21. Mesland
22. Monteaux
23. Monthou-sur-Bièvre
24. Les Montils
25. Rilly-sur-Loire
26. Saint-Bohaire
27. Saint-Cyr-du-Gault
28. Saint-Denis-sur-Loire
29. Saint-Étienne-des-Guérets
30. Saint-Gervais-la-Forêt
31. Saint-Lubin-en-Vergonnois
32. Saint-Sulpice-de-Pommeray
33. Sambin
34. Santenay
35. Seur
36. Valaire
37. Valencisse
38. Valloire-sur-Cisse
39. Veuzain-sur-Loire
40. Villebarou
41. Villefrancœur
42. Villerbon
43. Vineuil
