= Herbault =

- Commune
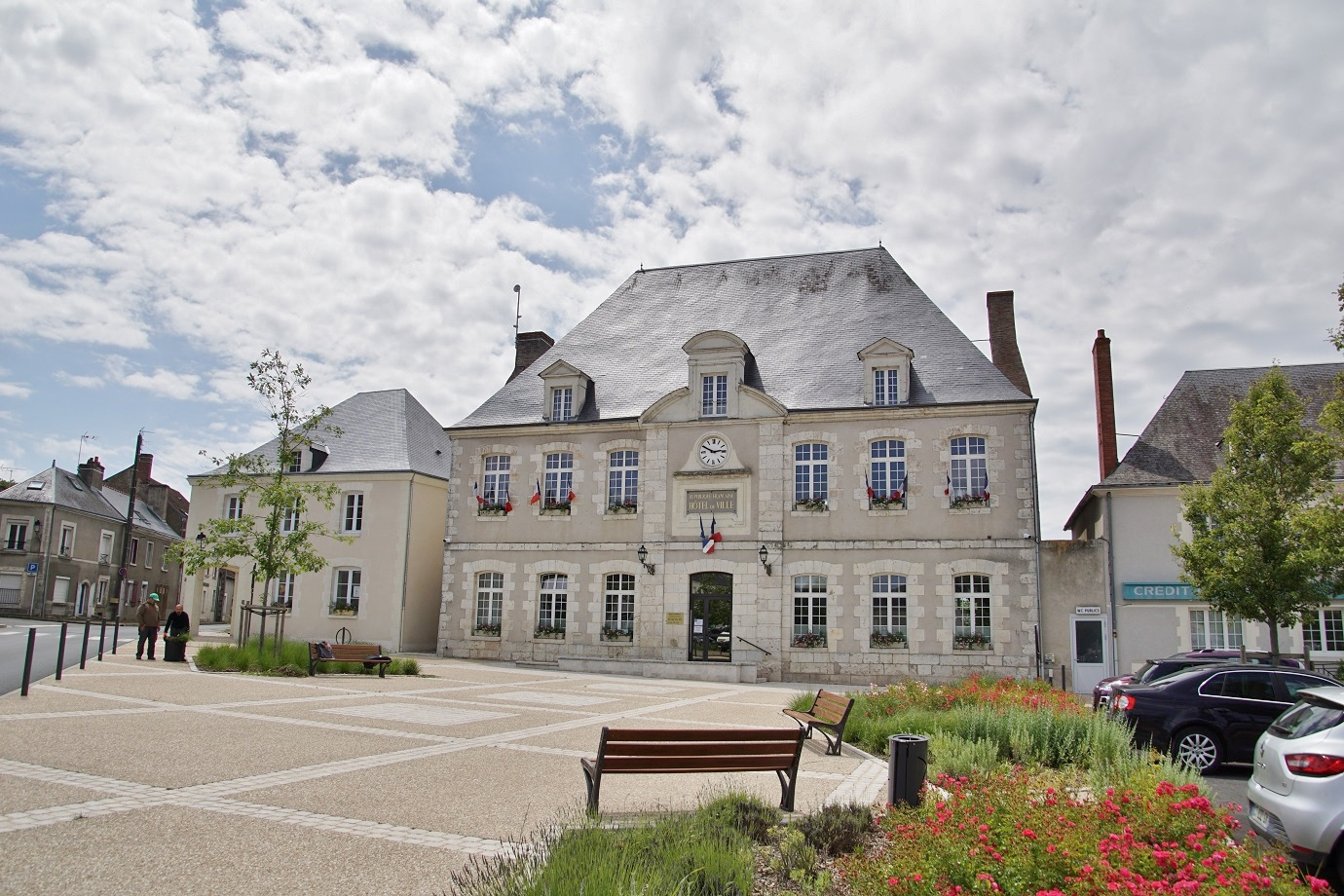
- Town hall of Herbault

- Coat of arms
- Location of Herbault
- Location within France Location within Centre-Val de Loire
- Coordinates: 47°36′20″N 1°08′23″E
- Country: France
- Region: Centre-Val de Loire
- Department: Loir-et-Cher
- Arrondissement: Blois
- Canton: Veuzain-sur-Loire
- Intercommunality: CA Blois Agglopolys

Government
  - Mayor (2020–2026): Michèle Augé
- Area^{1}: 13.01 km^{2} (5.02 sq mi)
- Elevation: 138 m (453 ft)
- Highest elevation: 147 m (482 ft)
- Lowest elevation: 105 m (344 ft)
- Population (2023): 1,133
  - Density: 87.09/km^{2} (225.6/sq mi)
- Time zone: UTC+01:00 (CET)
  - Summer (DST): UTC+02:00 (CEST)
- INSEE/Postal code: 41101 /41190
- ^{1} French Land Register data, which excludes lakes, ponds, glaciers > 1 km^{2} (0.386 sq mi or 247 acres) and river estuaries.

Herbault (French pronunciation: [ɛʁbo]) is a commune in the French department of Loir-et-Cher, region of Centre-Val de Loire, France.

== Population ==
Historical population
Year	Pop.	±% p.a.
1968	955	—
1975	894	−0.94%
1982	937	+0.67%
1990	926	−0.15%
1999	1,050	+1.41%
2007	1,228	+1.98%
2012	1,239	+0.18%
2017	1,249	+0.16%
2023	1,133	−1.61%
Source: INSEE

== See also ==
- Communes of the Loir-et-Cher department
