= Cisse (river) =

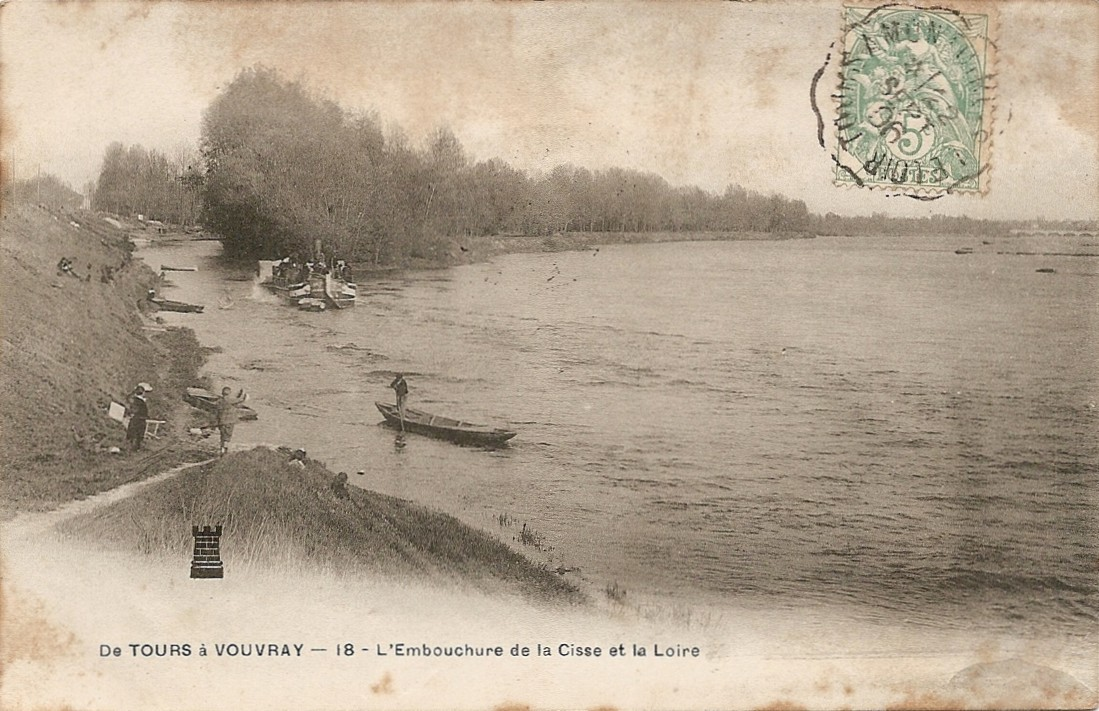
- The Cisse at Vouvray

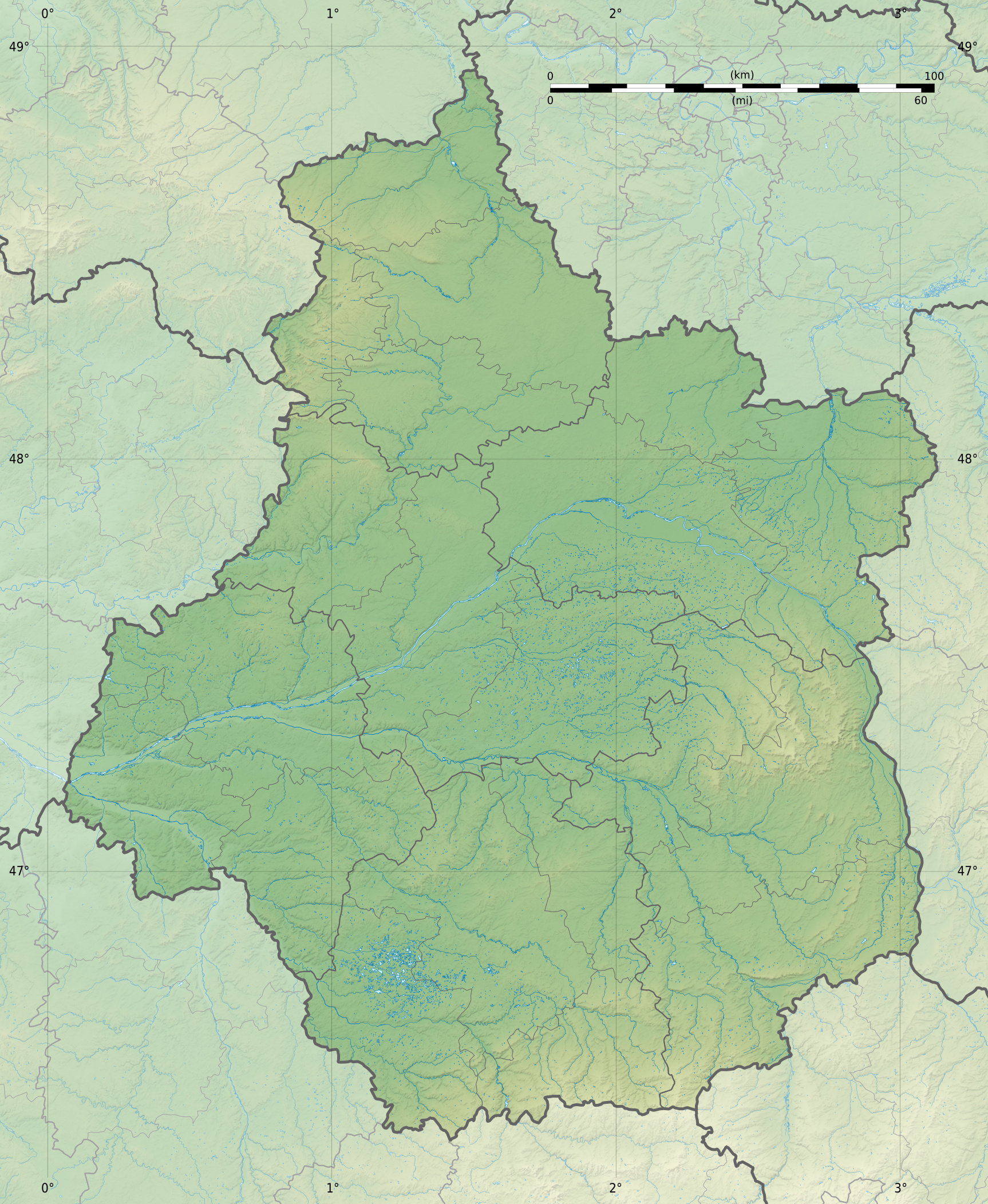
- Location within France Location within Centre-Val de Loire

Location
- Country: France

Physical characteristics
- Mouth
  - location: Loire
  - coordinates: 47°24′38″N 0°46′57″E
- Length: 87.7 km (54.5 mi)
- Basin size: 3,174 km^{2} (1,225 sq mi)
- Discharge
  - average: 32 m^{3}/s (1,100 cu ft/s)

Basin features
- Progression: Loire→ Atlantic Ocean

The Cisse (French pronunciation: [sis]) is a river in France which flows into the Loire at Vouvray. Its length is 87.7 km (54.5 mi).
