= Canton of Veuzain-sur-Loire =

Coordinates: 47.50°N 1.17°E

The canton of Veuzain-sur-Loire (before 2021: Onzain) is an administrative division of the Loir-et-Cher department, central France. It was created at the French canton reorganisation which came into effect in March 2015. Its seat is in Veuzain-sur-Loire.

It consists of the following communes:

1. Averdon
2. Champigny-en-Beauce
3. La Chapelle-Vendômoise
4. Fossé
5. Françay
6. Herbault
7. Lancôme
8. Landes-le-Gaulois
9. Marolles
10. Mesland
11. Monteaux
12. Saint-Bohaire
13. Saint-Cyr-du-Gault
14. Saint-Étienne-des-Guérets
15. Saint-Lubin-en-Vergonnois
16. Saint-Sulpice-de-Pommeray
17. Santenay
18. Valencisse
19. Valloire-sur-Cisse
20. Veuzain-sur-Loire
21. Villefrancœur
