= Hôtel de Ville, Blois =

Town hall in Blois, France

Hôtel de Ville
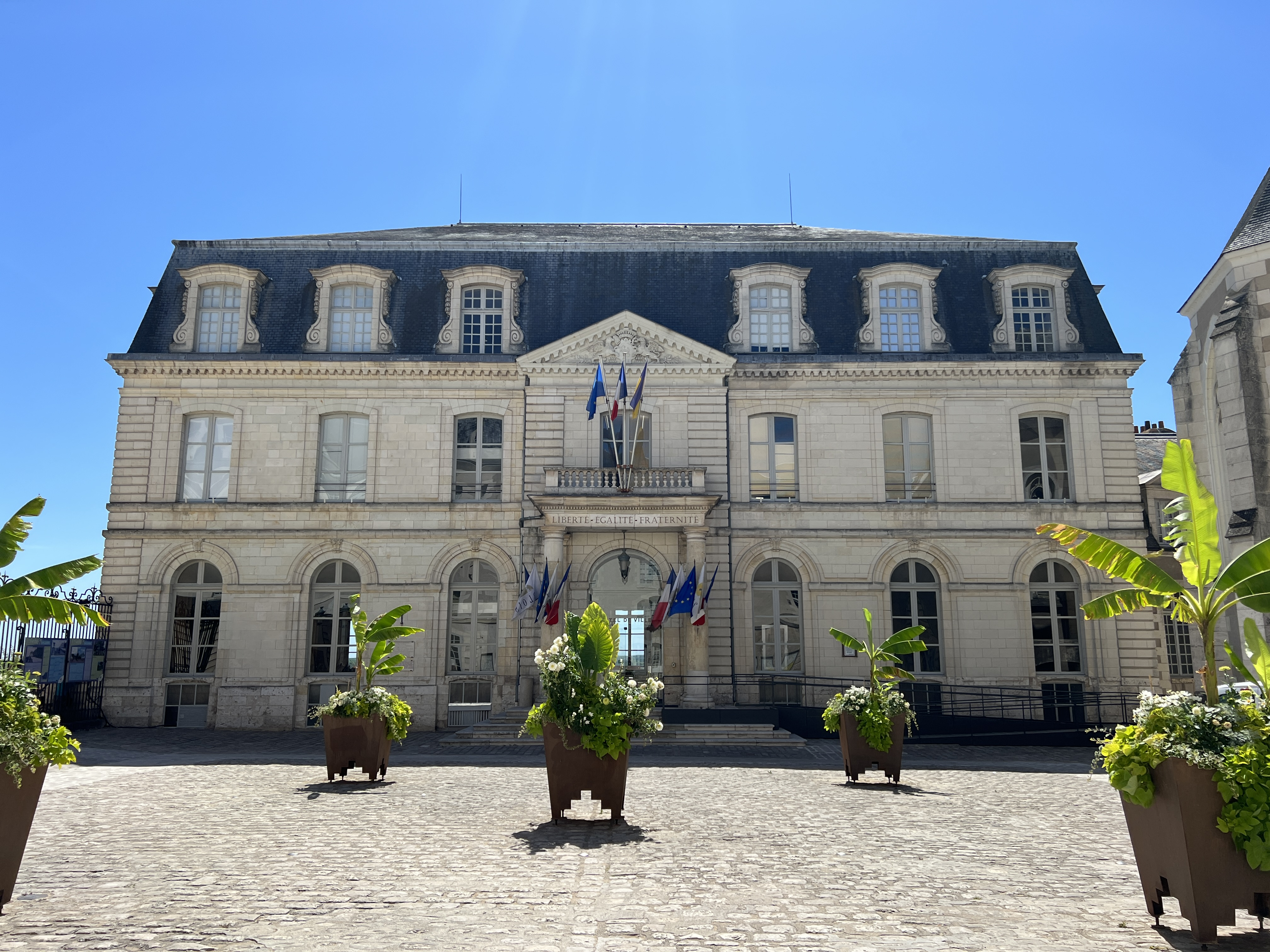
- The main frontage of the Hôtel de Ville in July 2022

General information
- Type: City hall
- Architectural style: Neoclassical style
- Location: Blois, France
- Coordinates: 47.5887°N 1.3372°E
- Completed: 1704

Design and construction
- Architect: Jacques Gabriel

Monument historique
- Official name: Ancien évêché
- Type: Inscrit
- Designated: 1930
- Reference no.: PA00098346

The Hôtel de Ville (French pronunciation: [otɛl də vil], City Hall) is a municipal building in Blois, Loir-et-Cher in central France, standing on Place Saint-Louis. It was designated a monument historique by the French government in 1930.

== History ==
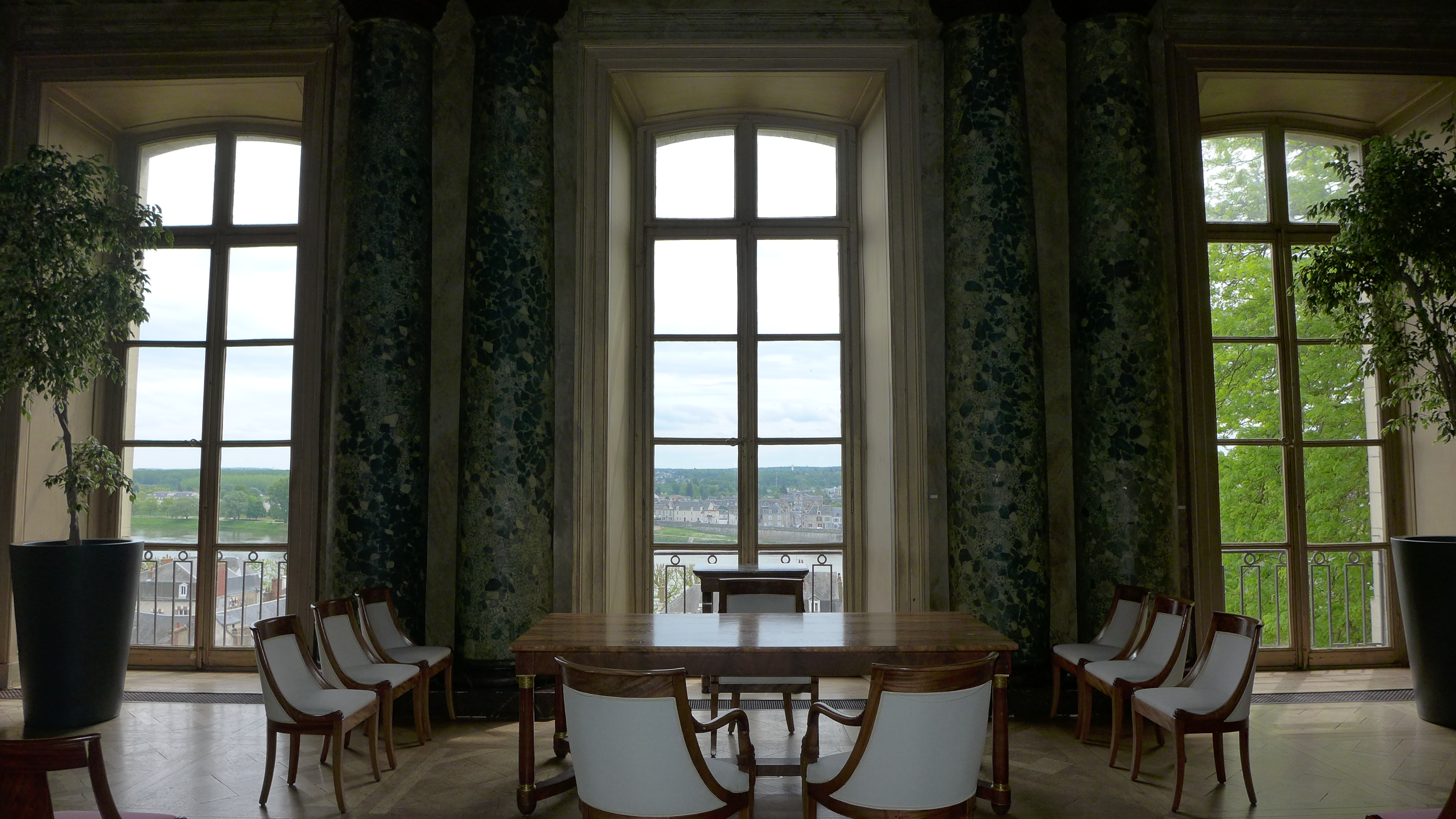
The Salle des Mariages (wedding room)

The first town hall in Blois was commissioned in around 1500. The site selected, on the northwest bank of the River Loire, had been gifted to the town by the governor and bailiff of Blois, Jehan de Saveuse, in 1457. De Saveuse had been appointed to his post by Charles I, Duke of Orléans, whose local seat was the Château of Blois. De Saveuse had originally intended that the gift would enable local people to receive the mass of the Holy Spirit, a form of communion which took place on the first Monday of each year. The construction was financed by donations from Louis XII and his wife, Queen Anne. The design was centred round a tower, which was decorated with royal emblems and was completed in the early 16th century.

In 1777, after the building had become dilapidated, the mayor, Jean-François III de La Saussaye, decided that it should be demolished and replaced. It was rebuilt in ashlar stone to a design by Charles Gendrier in the neoclassical style and was officially reopened on 27 November 1779. The design involved a symmetrical main frontage of seven bays facing onto the river. The central bay, which was slightly projected forward, featured a short flight of steps leading up to a square headed doorway. There was a casement window with shutters and a keystone on the first floor and a pediment with a clock in the tympanum above. The other bays were fenestrated by casement windows with shutters and keystones on the first two floors, and by dormer windows at attic level.

The building was cleared and briefly served as the home of Marie Louise, Duchess of Parma, who was ruling France as queen regent, in late March and early April 1814. It was almost completely destroyed by bombs dropped by German aircraft on 18 June 1940 during the Battle of France in the early stages of the Second World War. The mayor, Émile Laurens, was killed at his home on Rue Robert-Houdin during the bombardment.

After the war the town council decided to acquire an alternative building to replace the building that had been destroyed. The building they selected was the former bishop's house on Place Saint-Louis. The house had been commissioned by the Bishop of Blois, David Nicolas de Bertier, in around 1700. The site he selected was just to the east of Blois Cathedral. It was designed by Jacques Gabriel, built in the neoclassical style and was completed in March 1704. The design involved a symmetrical main frontage of seven bays facing onto Place Saint-Louis. The central bay, which was slightly projected forward, featured a short flight of steps leading up to a round headed doorway with voussoirs, which was flanked by Doric order columns supporting a balustraded balcony. There was a French door on the first floor and a pediment with a coat of arms in the tympanum above. The other bays were fenestrated by rounded headed windows with voussoirs and keystones on the ground floor, by segmental headed windows on the first floor, and by dormer windows at attic level.

Bishop Alexandre de Lauzières-Thémines created a library and installed an art collection in the building the late 18th century. During the French Revolution the building was seized by the state and the bishop and priests were driven out. It then served as the bishop's residence again from 1830 until implementation of the French law on the Separation of the Churches and the State in 1905. It then briefly accommodated a museum of natural history and fine arts before being used as a military hospital in the First World War. It was converted for municipal use as the town hall shortly after the Second World War. The bishop's apartments became the Salle du Conseil (council chamber) and a large Italian-style reception room became the Salles des Mariages (wedding room).
