= Blois =

Blois Ville de Blois
- Prefecture and commune
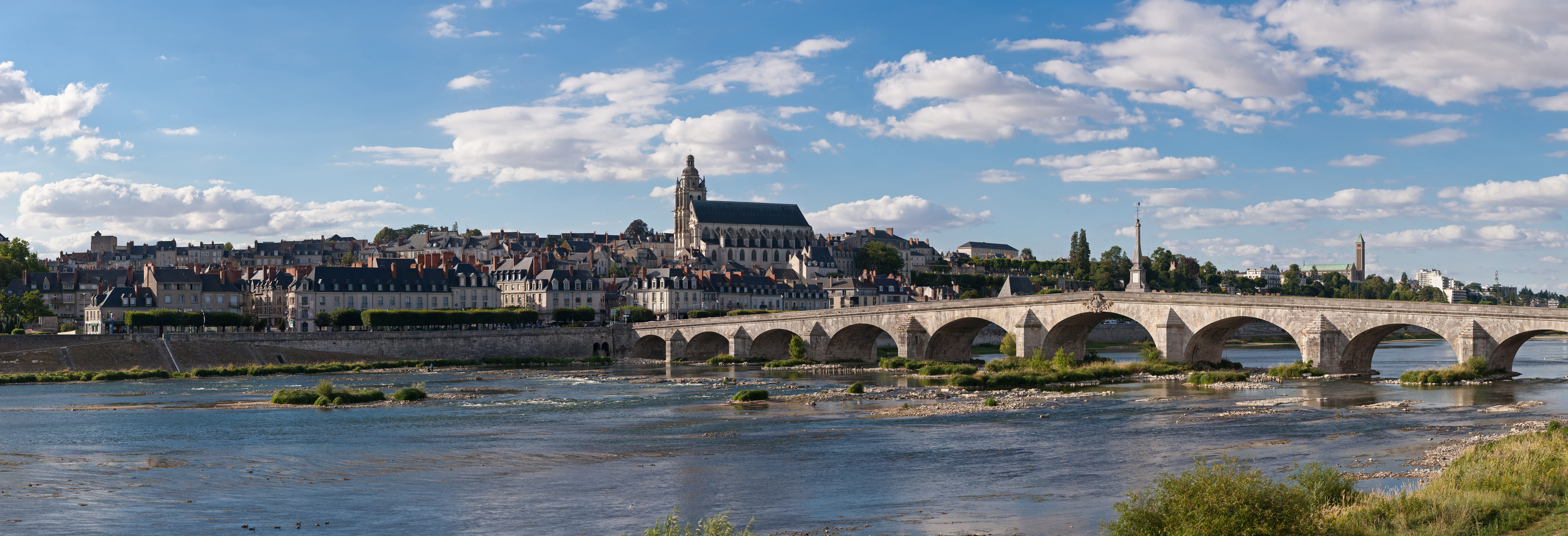
- Panoramic view of Blois on the Loire river, from Vienne, on the left bank

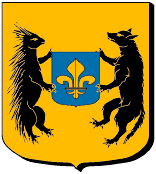
- Coat of arms
- Location of Blois
- Location within France Location within Centre-Val de Loire
- Coordinates: 47°35′38″N 1°19′41″E
- Country: France
- Region: Centre-Val de Loire
- Department: Loir-et-Cher
- Arrondissement: Blois
- Canton: Blois-1, 2 and 3 and Vineuil
- Intercommunality: CA Blois Agglopolys

Government
  - Mayor (2020–2026): Marc Gricourt (PS)
- Area^{1}: 37.46 km^{2} (14.46 sq mi)
- Elevation: 73 m (240 ft)
- Highest elevation: 135 m (443 ft)
- Lowest elevation: 63 m (207 ft)
- Population (2023): 47,219
  - Density: 1,261/km^{2} (3,265/sq mi)
- Demonym(s): Bloisian; French: Blésois(e)
- Time zone: UTC+01:00 (CET)
  - Summer (DST): UTC+02:00 (CEST)
- INSEE/Postal code: 41018 /41000
- ^{1} French Land Register data, which excludes lakes, ponds, glaciers > 1 km^{2} (0.386 sq mi or 247 acres) and river estuaries.

Blois (/blwɑː/ BLWAH; French: [blwa]) is a commune and the capital city of Loir-et-Cher department, in Centre-Val de Loire, France, on the banks of the lower Loire river between Orléans and Tours.

With 47,219 inhabitants in 2023, Blois is the most populated city of the department, and the 4th of the region.

Historically, the city was the capital of the County of Blois, created in 832, until its integration into the Royal domain in 1498, when Count Louis II of Orléans became King Louis XII of France. During the Renaissance, Blois was the official residence of the King of France.

== History ==
=== Pre-history ===
Since 2013, excavations have been conducted by the National Institute for Preventive Archaeological Research (INRAP in French) in Vienne where evidence was found of "one or more camps of Prehistoric hunter-gatherers, who also fished, after fish traps found there. They were Neolithic farmer-herders, who were present in the area around 6,000 BCE (8,000 years ago).

=== Ancient times ===
As major urban development begun in 1959, it uncovered the remains of a late Gallic settlement and an urban centre from the Gallo-Roman period. At that time, the town was located on the road linking Chartres to Bourges. In the network of cities of the Carnutes people, Blois was a secondary settlement. Excavations carried out on the right bank between 2001 and 2016 and on the left bank between 2013 and 2014, it revealed the presence of a large developed town on the right bank and an occupation on the left bank from the Gallic and Gallo-Roman periods. The Loire river has undoubtedly always been a major axis route, although no traces of a port have been discovered. However, there are the remains of former bridges linking the two banks.

=== Middle Ages ===
Though of ancient origin, Blois is first distinctly mentioned by Gregory of Tours in the 6th century, and the city gained some notability in the 9th century, when it became the seat of a powerful countship known as Blesum castrum by the counts of Blois.

The Robertians were at the head of the county of Blois before 900. When Hugh the Great became duke of the Franks, he left the title of count to his faithful vassal, Theobald I of Blois (circa 940). His descendants, known as "Thibaldians", remained as Counts up until the county became a royal possession in 1397. The House of Blois also succeeded in raising some of its members or descendants to the highest levels of the European nobility, notably by acceding to the thrones of France, England, Navarre, Spain and Portugal.

In 1171, Blois was the site of a blood libel against its Jewish community that led to 31 Jews (by some accounts 40) being burned to death. Their martyrdom also contributed to a prominent and durable school of poetry inspired by Christian persecution. In 1196, Count Louis I of Blois granted privileges to the townsmen; a commune, which survived throughout the Middle Ages, probably dates from this time. The counts of the Châtillon dynastic line resided at Blois more often than their predecessors, and the oldest parts of the Château of Blois (from the 13th century) were built by them.

In the Middle Ages, Blois was the seat of the County of Champagne when the latter passed to the French crown in 1314, forming the province of Champagne within the Kingdom of France. By 1397, Count Guy II of Blois-Châtillon offered the county to his cousin, Duke Louis I of Orléans, brother of King Charles VI. In 1429, Joan of Arc made Blois her base of operations for the relief of Orléans. She rode the 35 miles on 29 April from Blois to relieve Orléans. In 1440, after his captivity in England, Duke Charles of Orléans (son of Duke Louis I) took up residence in the Château of Blois, where in 1462 his son was born, Duke Louis II of Orléans who would afterwards become Louis XII.

=== Renaissance era ===
By 1498, King Charles VIII died with no heirs in the Château of Amboise. Subsequently, Duke Louis II ran 35 km (22 mi) between the Château and Blois, and was crowned King Louis XII of France. He then married Charles VIII's widow, Queen Anne of Brittany, in 1499. The birth of their daughter, Claude of France, effected the union of Brittany with the France. Louis XII, as the last hereditary Count of Blois, naturally established his royal Court in the city. The Treaty of Blois, which temporarily halted the Italian Wars, was signed there in 1504–1505. During his reign, the city experienced a massive redevelopment, with some architectural elements inspired from the Italian Renaissance, as seen in the medieval castle immediately turned into a château, and the construction of many hôtels particuliers for the nobility throughout the entire kingdom. One of which, Hôtel d'Alluye, was built as a copy of an Italian palace for Florimond Robertet, who was an important French minister under King Charles VIII, King Louis XII and King Francis I.

On 1 January 1515, Louis XII died. His throne would be passed to Francis I, the husband to his daughter, Claude of France. In 1519, King Francis I ordered the construction of the Château of Chambord (10 miles away from Blois), but its construction lasted for one year before he died in 1547. In the meantime, he gradually expressed his will to move to Fontainebleau, near Paris, and started to abandon Blois. Much of the royal furniture was moved from Blois to Fontainebleau by 1539.

The French Wars of Religion were a significantly destructive conflict for the French people. The city's inhabitants included many Calvinists, and in 1562 and 1567 it was the scene of struggles with the Catholics. On 4 July 1562, Blois and Beaugency, conquered by Protestants just before, were looted by the Catholics led by Maréchal de St. André. On 7 February 1568, Protestants under Captain Boucard's command, looted and invaded the town, eventually killing many Catholics. Grey friars were also killed and thrown in the well of their own convent. In addition, all the churches were ransacked. In 1576 and 1588, King Henry III convoked the Estates General to Blois where he attained refuge after an uprising called the Day of the Barricades. In response, Duke Henry I of Guise was assassinated on 23 December 1588 for his involvement in the uprising. The following day, his brother, Cardinal Louis II of Guise, who was also Archbishop of Reims, suffered the same fate. Their deaths were shortly followed by that of the Queen-Mother, Catherine de' Medici.

In the 16th century, the French Royal court often made Blois their leisure resort.

=== Early modern era ===
After the departure of the Royal Court towards Paris, Blois lost the status of a Royal residence, along with the luxury and economic activity that came with it. King Henry IV relocated the Royal library to Fontainebleau, which would later be the National Library of France (Bibliothèque nationale de France).

In 1606, Philippe de Béthune gave his ownership of Vienne-lez-Blois village, on the left bank of the Loire river, to Blois, making it a part of the city afterwards known as Blois-Vienne. From 1617 to 1619 Marie de' Medici, wife of King Henri IV, exiled from the court by his son, King Louis XIII, lived in the château. By 1622, the Counter-Reformation arrived in Blois and a Society of Jesus was founded. St. Louis Chapel, which is today St. Vincent Church was also built at this time.

Then in 1634, Louis XIII exiled his brother, Gaston, Duke of Orléans and Count of Blois, who became attached to the city. The Duke in 1657, found a hospital in Blois-Vienne, now named Résidence Gaston d'Orléans, and financed the reconstruction of the Hôtel-Dieu. He remained in Blois until his death, in 1660.

Under Louis XIV's reign, Blois became an independent bishopric. David Nicolas de Bertier, first bishop of Blois from 1697, chose as his seat the cathedral church of St. Solenne, that had been destroyed by a storm and was under reconstruction, before being completed three years later in 1700, thanks to the intervention of Colbert's wife, who herself came from Blois. The new edifice became Blois Cathedral and was dedicated to St. Louis.

A large episcopal palace was built by King Louis XIV's official architect, Jacques Gabriel, right next to the newly built cathedral, on a site overlooking the Loire Valley. Landscaping of terraced gardens began in 1703 and lasted nearly 50 years. The so-called Bishopric Gardens were first open to the public in 1791 by Henri Grégoire (known as the Abbot Grégoire), the first constitutional bishop after the French Revolution.

During the night of 6-7 February 1716, the medieval bridge collapsed. Construction of a new one was ordered the following year. Jacques-Gabriel Bridge was inaugurated in 1724. All the levies were consolidated, and the river channel of La Bouillie in the prolongation of La Creusille Harbour was closed and dried.

When Duke Gaston of Orléans died, the château was stripped by King Louis XIV, and completely abandoned, to the point that King Louis XVI once considered demolishing it in 1788. The building was saved when the Royal-Comtois Regiment established their base within it.

In 1790, Orléanais province was dissolved, the Département of Loir-et-Cher was created with Blois as the local capital.

By 1814, Marie Louise, Duchess of Parma and wife of Napoleon I, found refuge in Blois.

=== Contemporary era ===
There was new development in Blois in the 19th century. Firstly, the railway arrived in 1846 with the inauguration of the Paris–Tours railway, whose Blois Station is a stop. The competition with river transport gradually forced La Creusille Harbour to reinvent its activity. In parallel, the city became more industrialised from 1848 thanks to a successful chocolate brand created by Bloisian, Victor-Auguste Poulain.

As in Paris, urban organization in Blois was redesigned during 1850 and 1870 by Mayor Eugène Riffault, who was friends with Baron Georges-Eugène Haussmann. Riffault ordered the construction of a boulevard separating the modern upper town (where the cathedral, Hôtel of Préfecture, and Halle aux Grains are located), from the medieval lower town. He also paved the way to the construction of the boulevard Daniel Depuis, in the West of Blois. Between 1862 and 1865, the Denis-Papin staircase were built under La Morandière's supervision, in the axis of Jacques-Gabriel Bridge and Blois-Vienne's Wilson Avenue.

In the meantime, the lower town faced three of the most significant floods of the Loire river: in 1846, 1856 (the worst), and 1866. The central districts of St. Jean and Blois-Vienne were under water, as well as La Bouillie spillway.

On 13 December 1871, the Prussian Army took control of Blois during the Franco-Prussian War. The city was taken back by French forces under General Joseph Pourcet and General Bertrand de Chabron. Since then, a memorial stands on Wilson Avenue in Vienne.

In 1939, the construction of Blois Basilica was completed. That same year, between 29 January and 8 February, more than 3,100 Spanish refugees came to the Loir-et-Cher department, fleeing the Spanish Civil War and Dictator Francisco Franco. In June 1940, the German bombings destroyed a large part of the centre, and the French destroyed the 10th arch of Jacques-Gabriel Bridge to prevent further advance for the enemy. The German army bombed the former Town Hall on 16 June, killing Mayor Émile Laurens in the process, and took over the city two days later, on 18 June, the exact same day of Charles de Gaulle's Appeal for Internal Resistance.

Between June and August 1944, US-English-allied bombings destroyed other infrastructures, like the railway bridge between Blois and Romorantin. In total during World War II, 230 people were killed, and 1,522 buildings were entirely or partially destroyed. On 16 August 1944, the German troops withdrew to Blois-Vienne to seek refuge and destroyed the three central arches of the bridge. On 1 September, they surrendered. The bridge was rebuilt and reopened in December 1948.

In 1959, Mayor Marcel Bühler received President Charles de Gaulle and launched the construction of the ZUP, at the North of the city, on the same model of so-called banlieues of Paris or any other French city.

== Population ==
Historical population

Year	Pop.	±% p.a.
1793	13,280	—
1800	14,900	+1.66%
1806	13,054	−2.18%
1821	15,147	+1.00%
1831	13,138	−1.41%
1836	13,628	+0.74%
1841	16,156	+3.46%
1846	17,149	+1.20%
1851	17,749	+0.69%
1856	17,749	+0.00%
1861	20,331	+2.75%
1866	20,068	−0.26%
1872	19,860	−0.17%
1876	20,515	+0.81%
1881	21,077	+0.54%
1886	22,150	+1.00%
1891	23,457	+1.15%
1896	23,542	+0.07%
1901	23,789	+0.21%

Year	Pop.	±% p.a.
1906	23,972	+0.15%
1911	23,955	−0.01%
1921	23,989	+0.01%
1926	23,991	+0.00%
1931	24,607	+0.51%
1936	26,025	+1.13%
1946	26,774	+0.28%
1954	28,190	+0.65%
1962	33,838	+2.31%
1968	42,264	+3.78%
1975	49,778	+2.37%
1982	47,243	−0.74%
1990	49,318	+0.54%
1999	49,171	−0.03%
2007	47,854	−0.34%
2012	45,903	−0.83%
2017	46,086	+0.08%
2023	47,219	+0.41%

Source: EHESS and INSEE (1968–2023)

== Landmarks and tourism ==
Since 1986, Blois is part of the French Towns of Art and History programme, which promotes the cultural and historical estate.

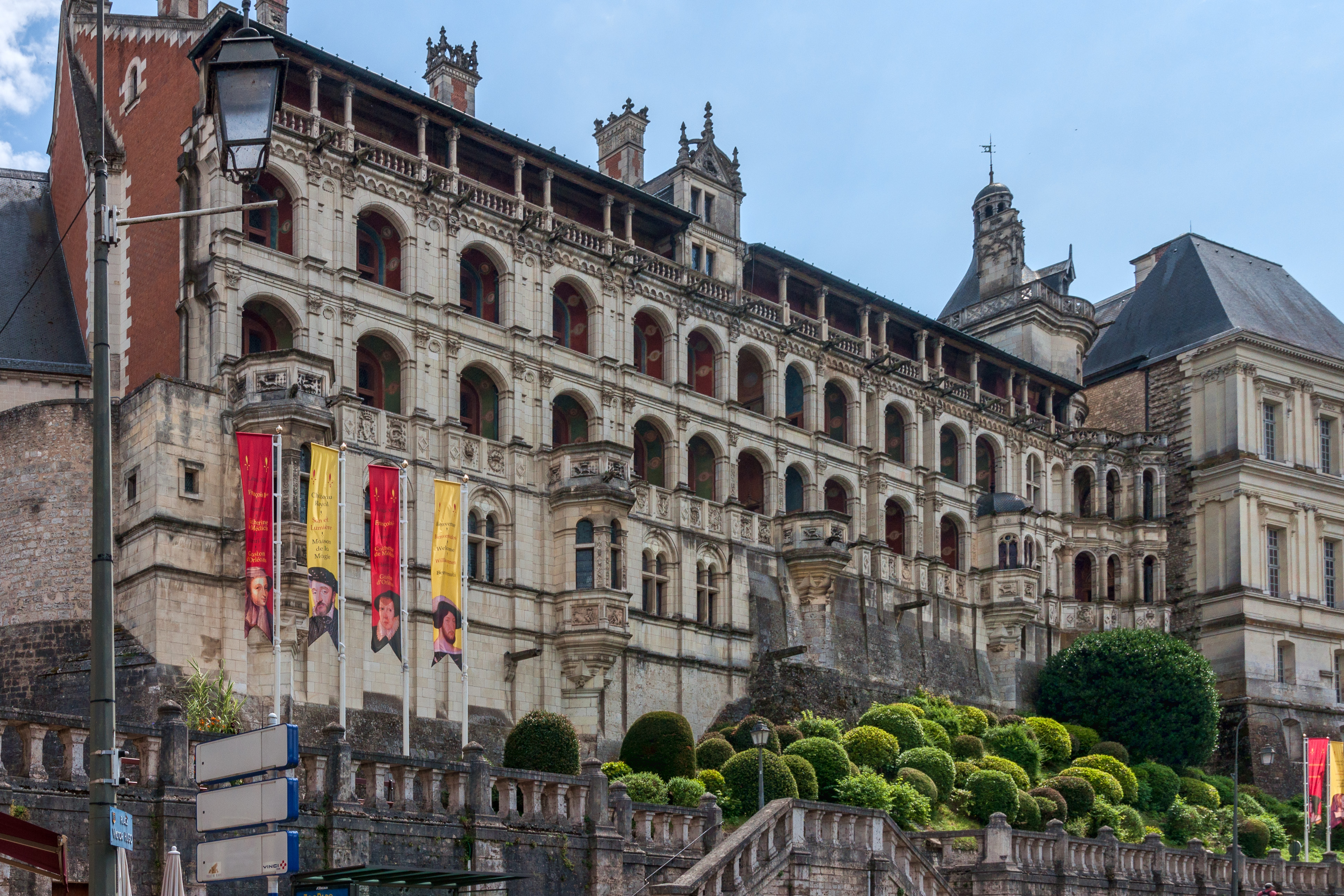
Lodges Façade of the Château of Blois, on Francis I wing, seen from Victor-Hugo Square

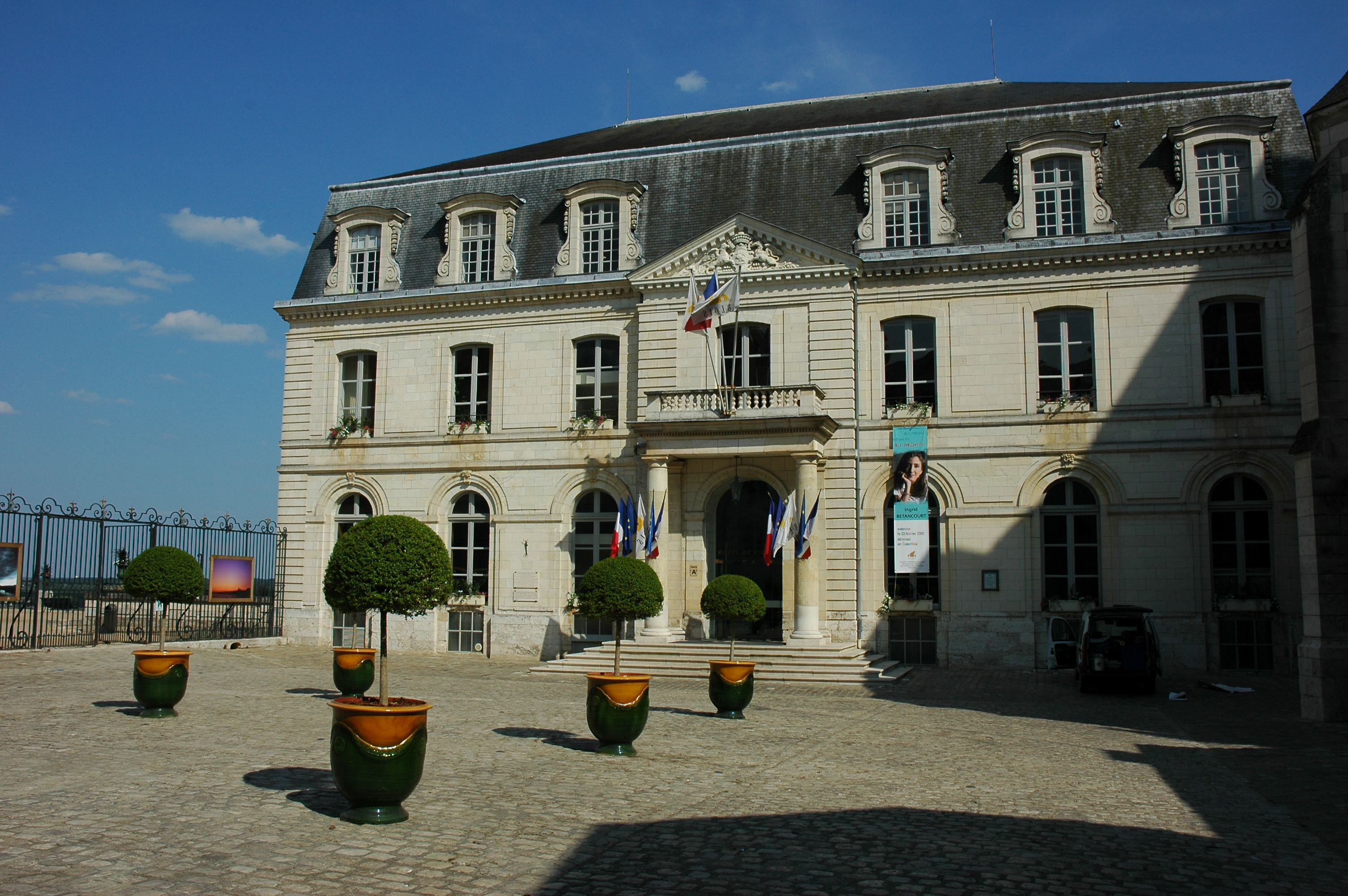
Hôtel de Ville

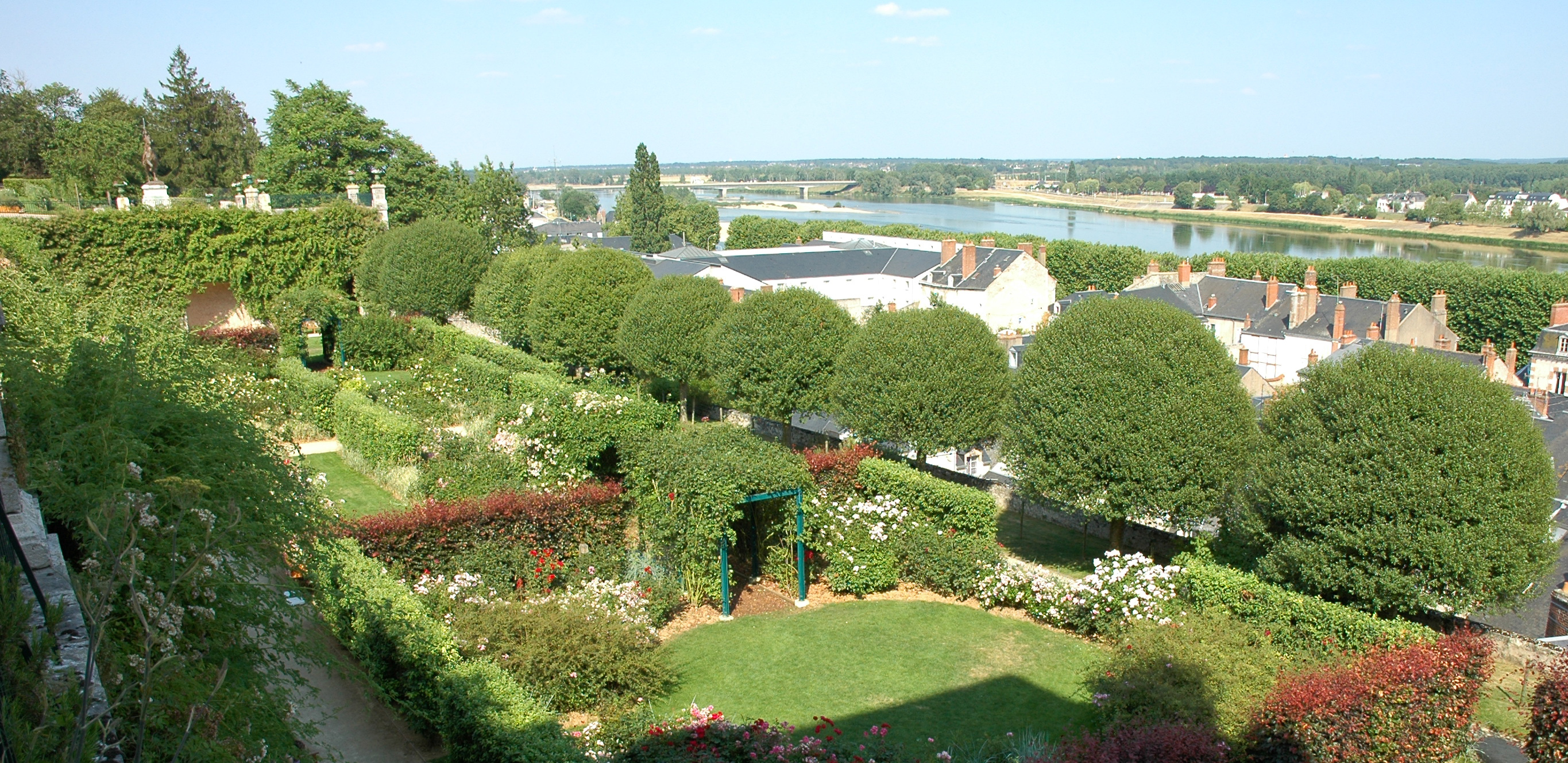
Rosarium in the Bishopric Gardens

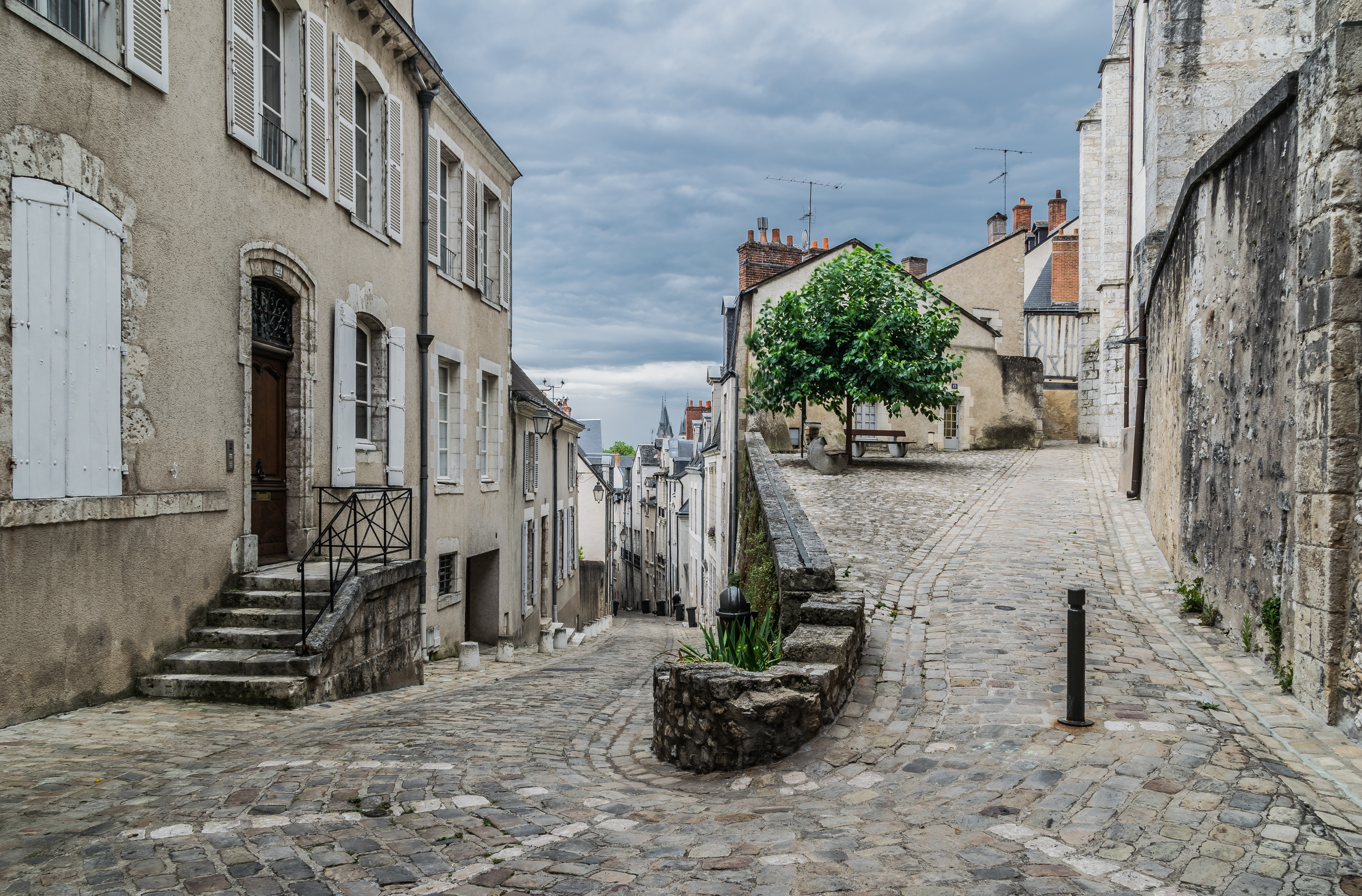
Street cross between rue des Papegaults and rue des Petis Degrés St. Louis

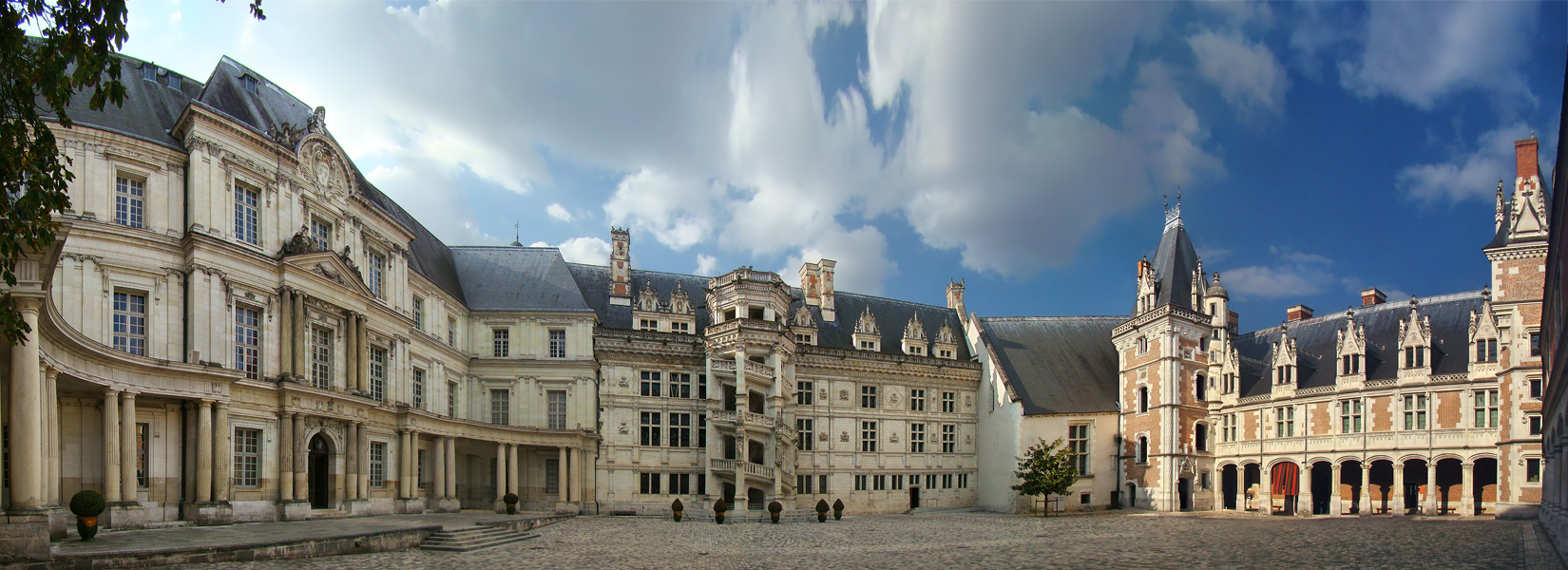
Château of Blois (seen from the South)

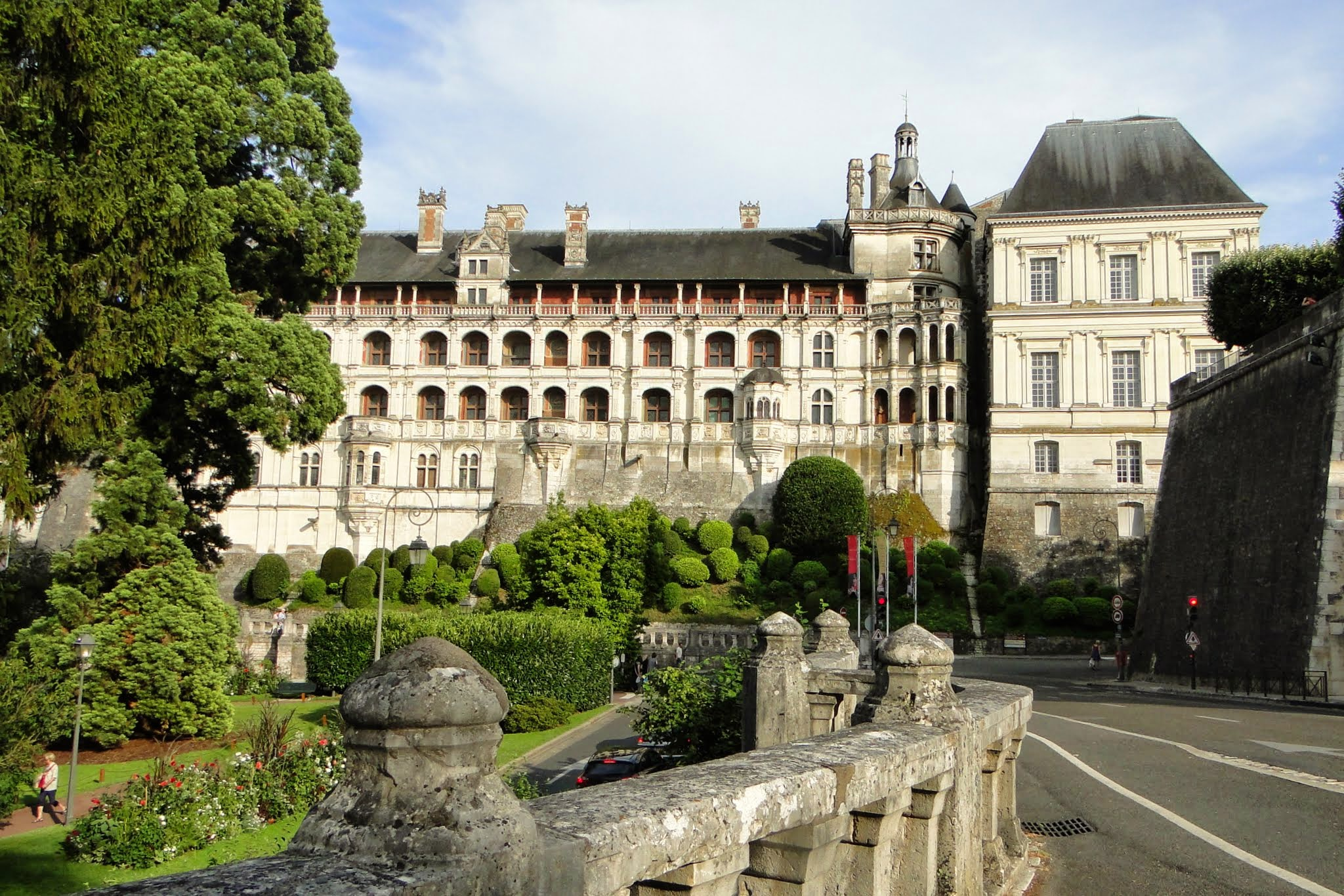
Château of Blois (seen from inside)

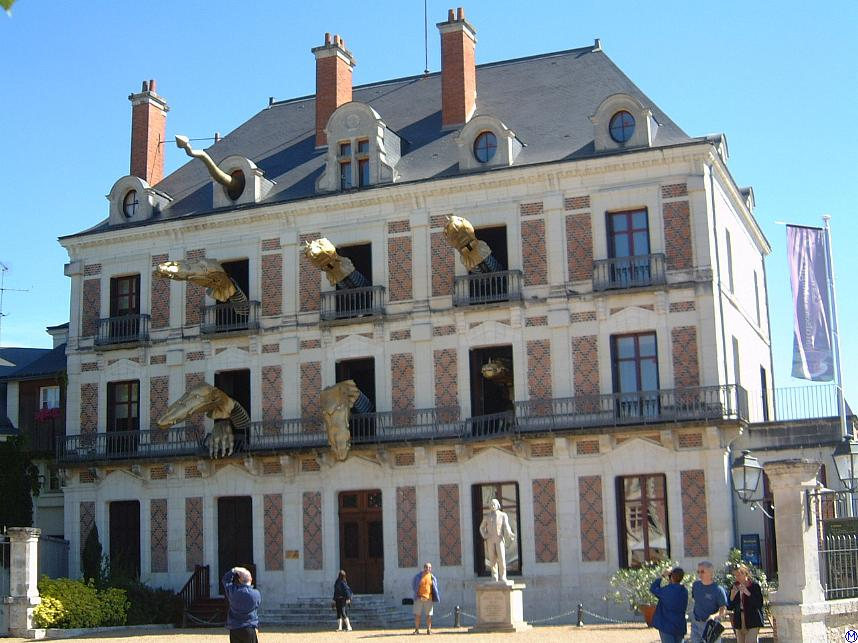
Robert-Houdin House of Magic

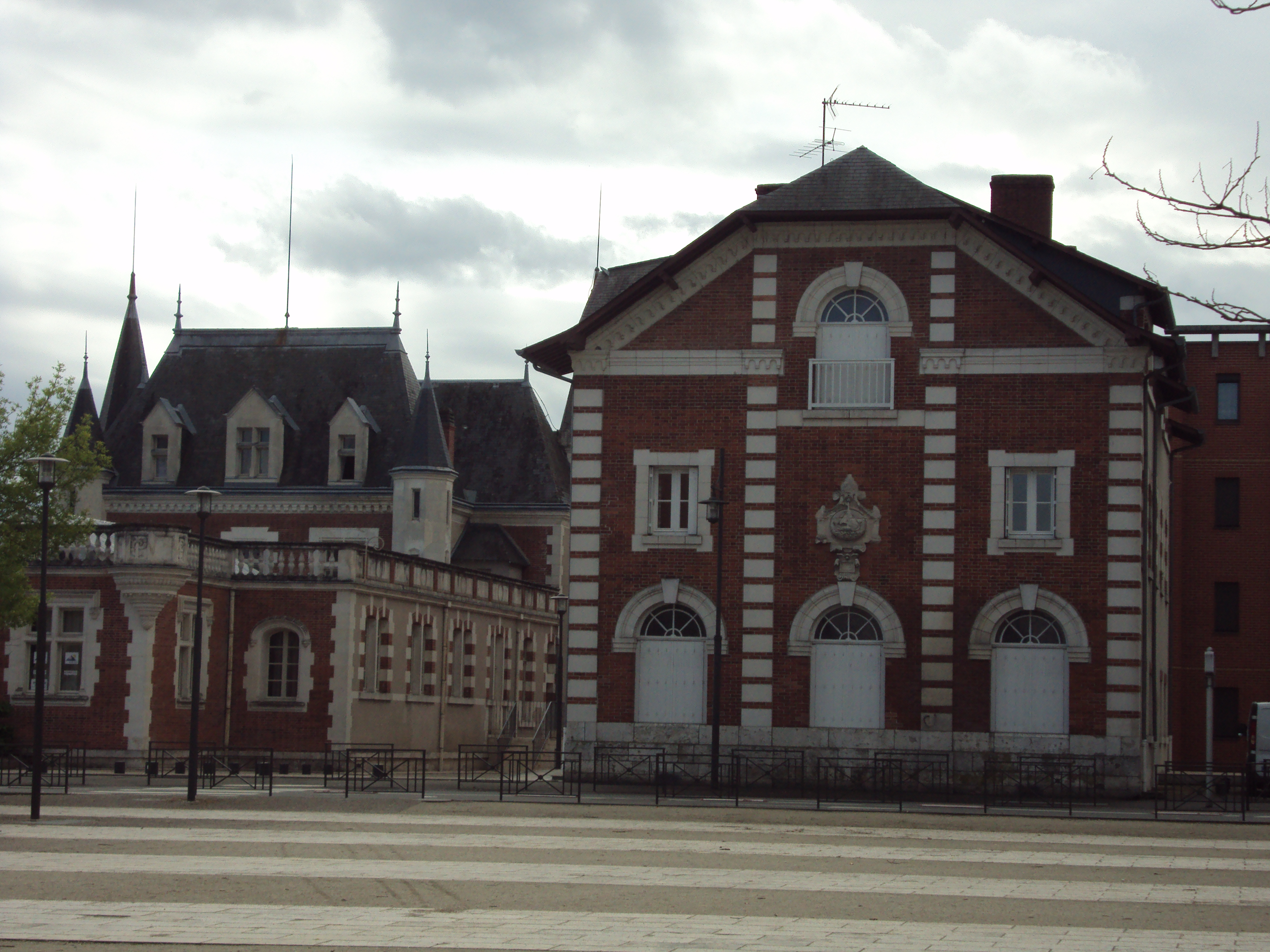
Former Poulain Chocolate Factory

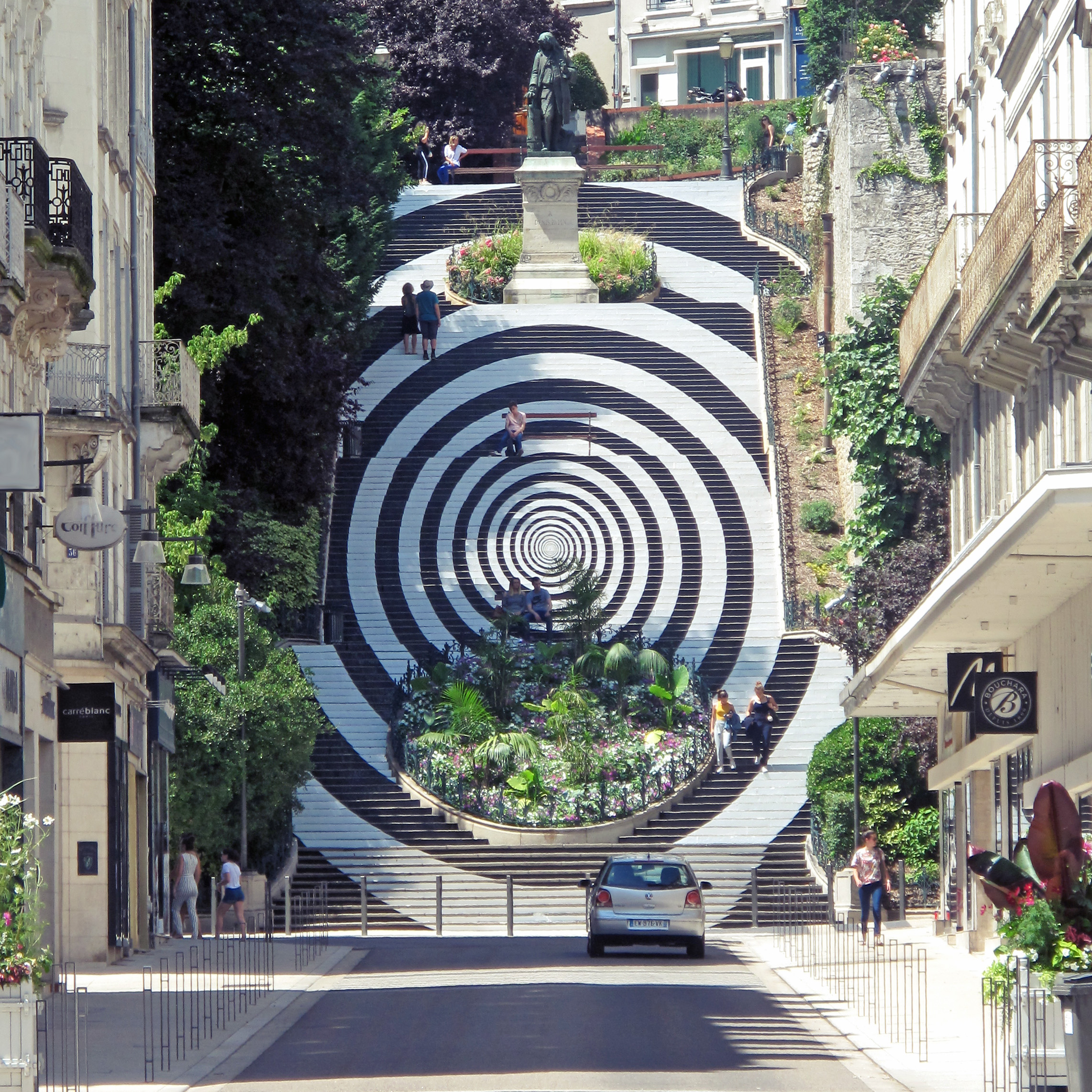
Denis-Papin staircase in 2018

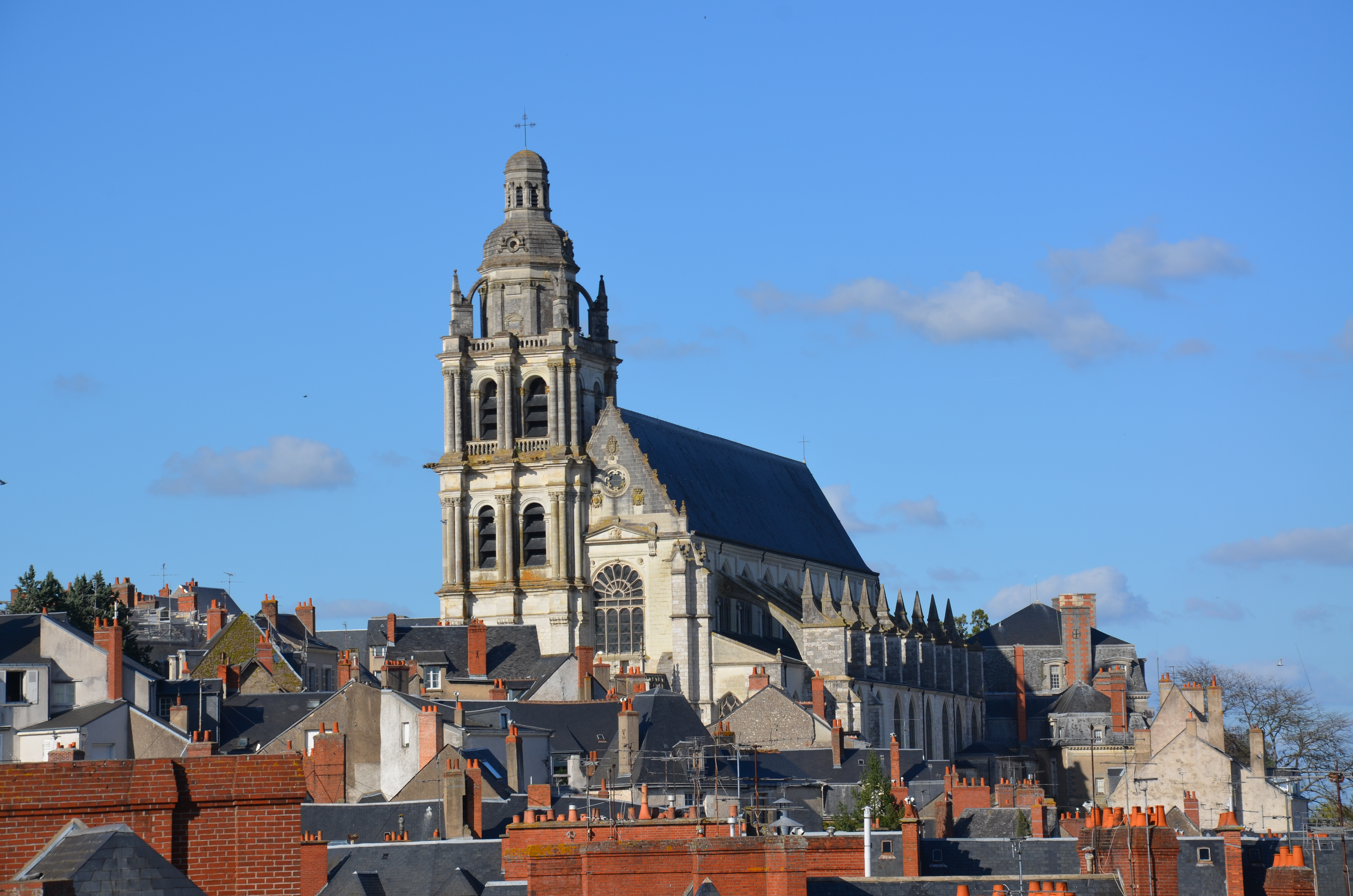
Blois Cathedral

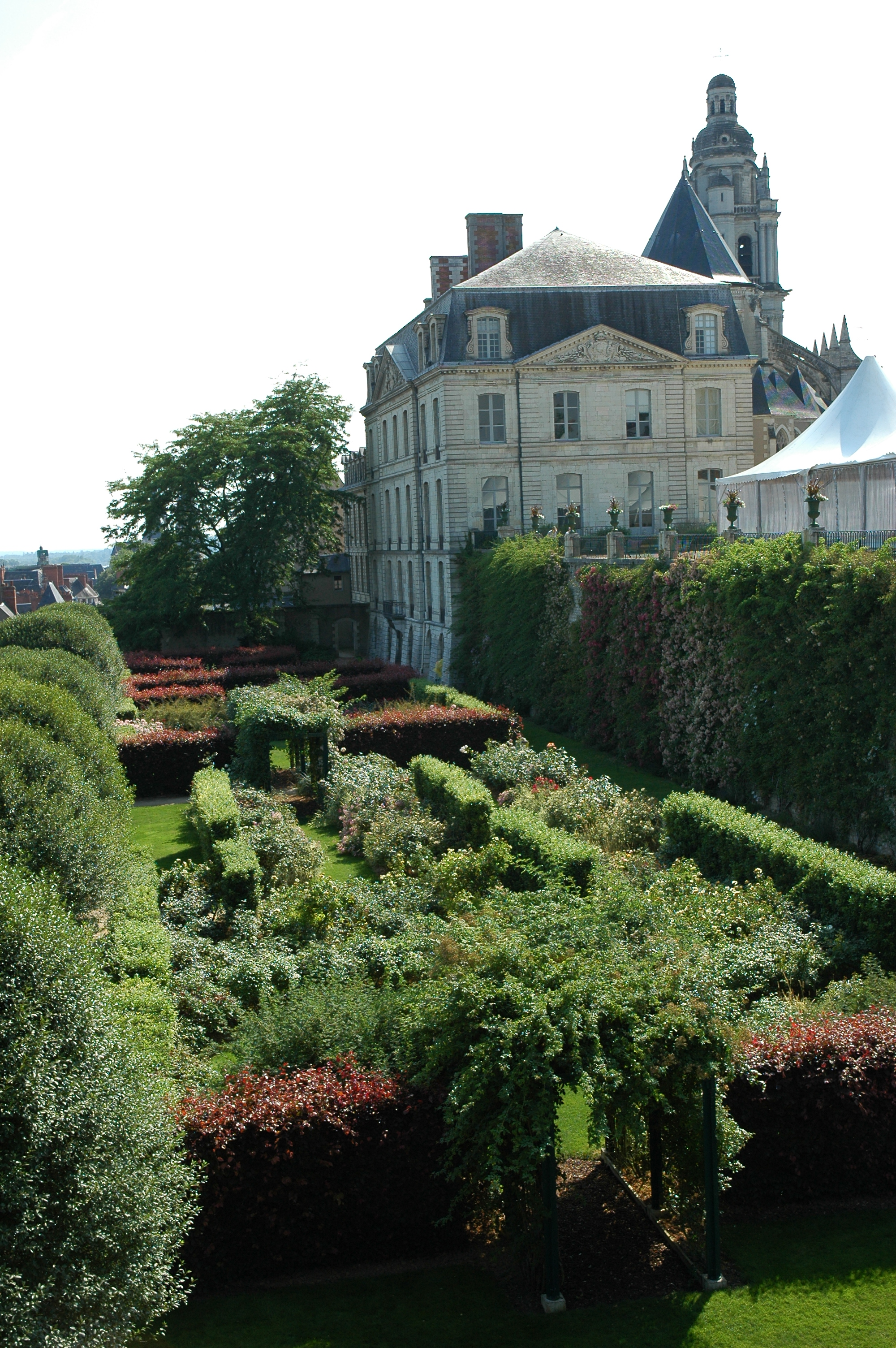
Blois Cathedral, Hôtel de Ville (Town Hall), and the Rosarium seen from the Bishopric Gardens

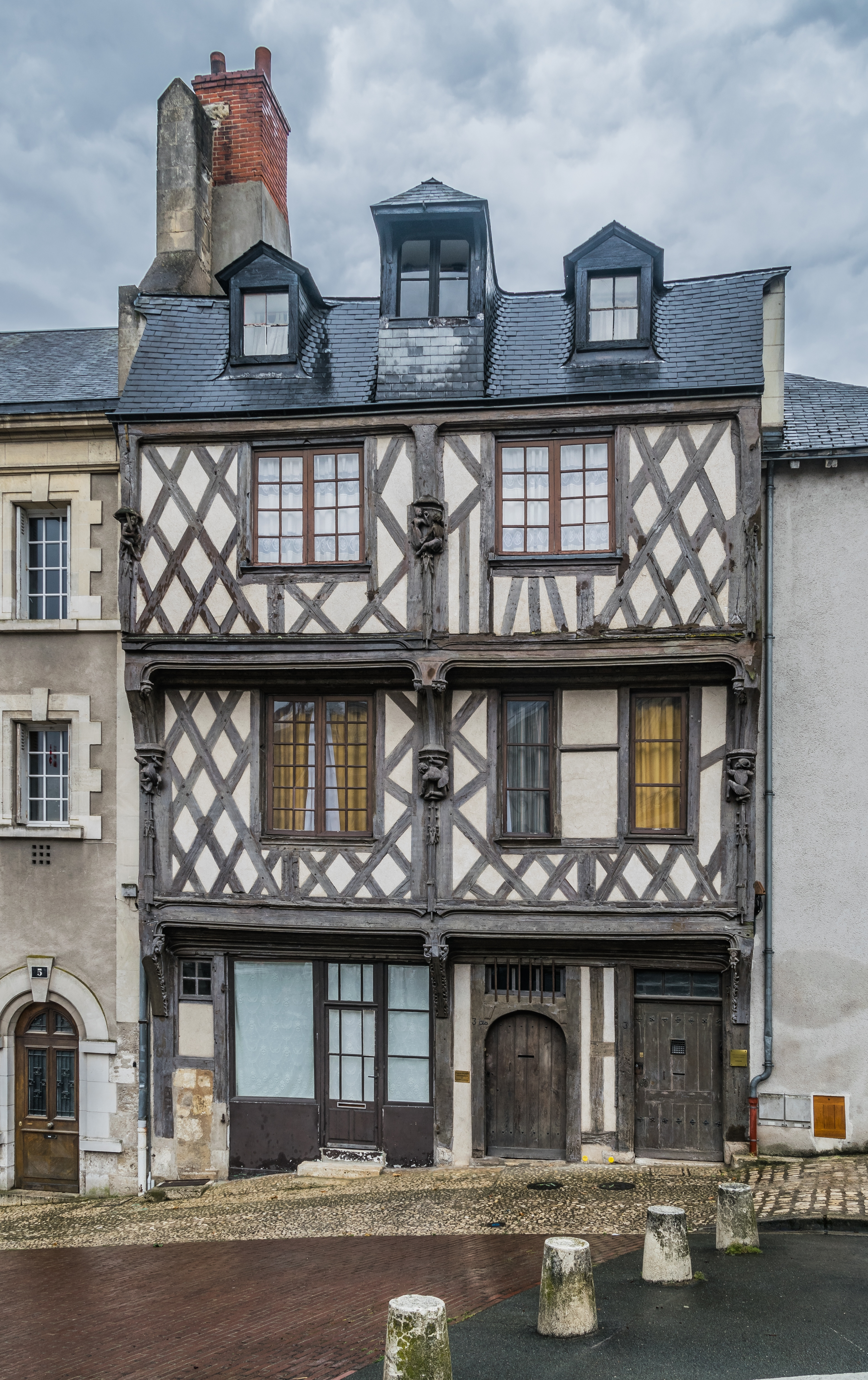
The Maison des Acrobates

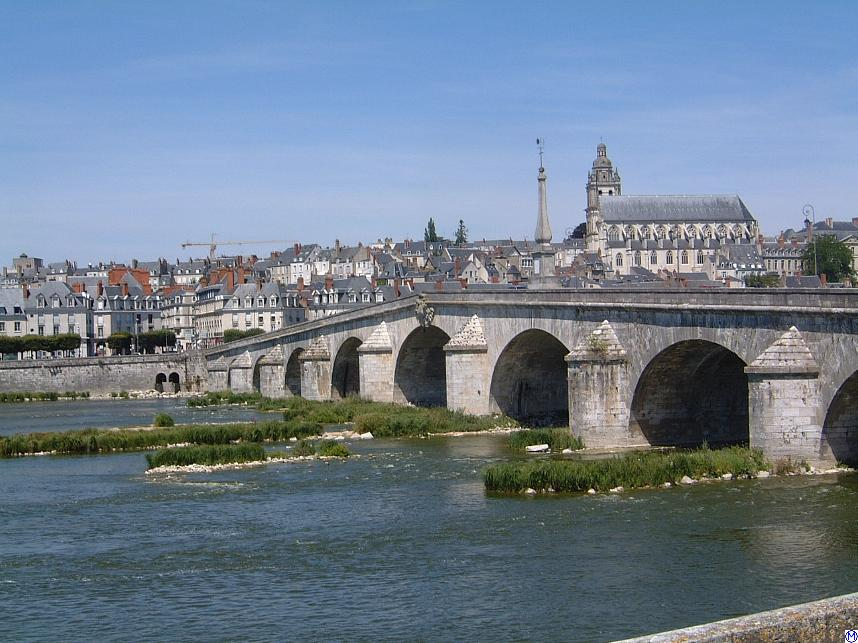
The Jacques-Gabriel Bridge, with the cathedral behind, over the Loire river

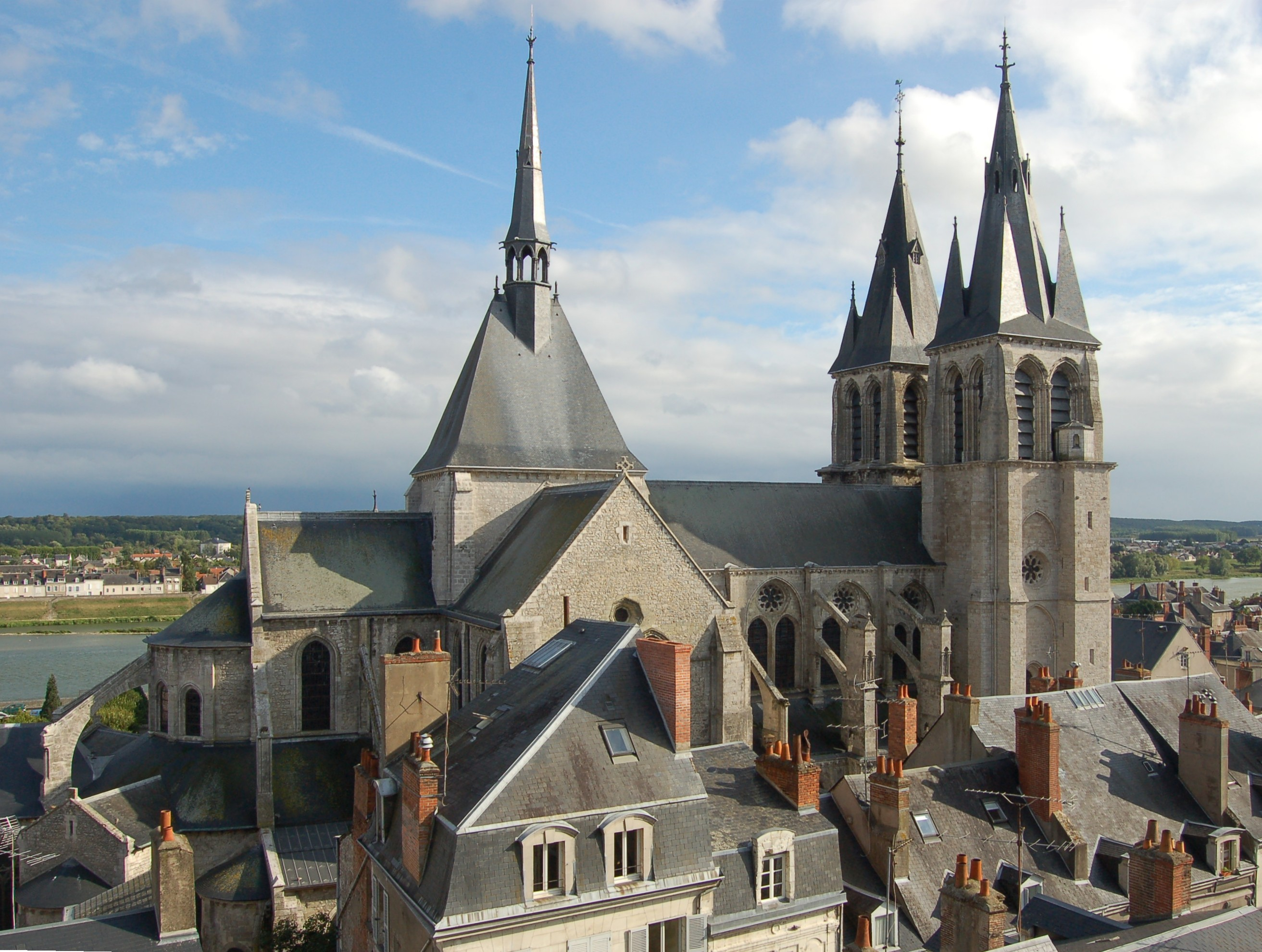
St. Nicholas Blois Church

=== Château of Blois ===
The Château of Blois, a Renaissance multi-style château once occupied by King Louis XII, is located in the centre of the city, and an 18th-century stone bridge spans the Loire. It was also the residence of many Counts of Blois, who were amongst the most closest vassals to the King of France between the 9th and the 14th century. Many gardens are located around the château, like:

- the St. Sauveur Garden (Parterre Saint-Sauveur in French);
- the Lily Garden (Jardin des Lices);
- the King's Stronghold (Bastion du Roi), and;
- Victor Hugo Square (Square Victor Hugo).

=== House of Magic ===
Right in front of the château, La Maison de la Magie Robert-Houdin (i.e.: Robert-Houdin House of Magic) is a museum dedicated to illusionism. This is the only public museum in Europe which incorporates in one place collections of magic and a site for permanent performing arts, and directly reflects the personality of Robert-Houdin.

=== Louis-XII Place and Fountains ===
Opened after bombings in 1944, the place stands right below the château, closest to the Loire river, and is actually located at the centre of Blois downtown. There are local shops and restaurants, and a 16th-century fountain stands below the sycamores planted in the place. Known as Louis XII Fountain (Fontaine Louis XII), this is one of the greatest and oldest water inlets throughout the city, but far from being the only one. Among the other founts, there are:

- St. Martin Fountain (Fontaine Saint-Martin), below the staircase between the château and Louis XII Place;
- St. Nicholas Fountain (Fontaine Saint-Nicolas), within the St. Nicholas Church;
- Elected Representatives' Fountain (Fontaine des Élus), in rue Foulerie;
- Ave Maria Fountain (Fontaine Ave Maria), in place Ave Maria;
- Town hall Fountain (Fontaine de l'Hôtel de Ville), below the Denis Papin staircase (where was the former Town Hall before World War II);
- St. Jack Fountain (Fontaine Saint-Jacques), in rue Denis Papin;
- Corbigny Fountain (Fontaine de Corbigny), in Victor Hugo Square;
- Simple Fountain (Fontaine des Simples), in the Lily Garden, in remembrance of a monumental Versailles-style fountain lost after WWII bombings.

=== Comics Museum ===
Blois is also the location of so-called Maison de la BD, a museum devoted to the art of comic books. Since the 1980s, this museum hosts an annual comic festival in late November called BD Boum, described as "the leading free comic book festival in France".

=== Former Hôtel-Dieu ===
Already by 924, monks from the St. Lomer community were given some acres below the medieval castle, but outside the city walls, on the bank of the Loire river. In the 13th century, a proper church was built, then fortified because of the Hundred Years' War. St. Lomer Abbey was completely destroyed during the French Wars of Religion. The edifice was rebuilt until the early 18th century. When the French Revolution broke out by 1789, the church was turnt into a Hôtel-Dieu, namely a charity hospital for the have-nots, because Revolutionners destroyed many clergy- and royal-related monuments. After that, new buildings were added to the original St. Lomer Abbey, which became St. Nicholas Church, and the additional edifices remained dedicated to the Hôtel-Dieu of the city. Nonetheless, this part was gradually abandoned and taken back by some public services. A reconversion project is currently under study.

=== Former Poulain Chocolate Factory ===
In the late 19th century, Bloisian industrialist and chocolatier Victor-Auguste Poulain established his brand's factory next to Blois station. The premises moved in the 1980s. Nowadays, those are housings and host the National Institute and School of Applied Sciences (INSA).

=== Denis-Papin Staircase ===
As Blois is built on a pair of steep hills, winding and steep pathways run through the city, culminating in long staircases at various points. The most iconic of them is the monumental Denis-Papin staircase which overlooks the town, provides a panoramic view by overlooking the downtown and the Loire Valley, and regularly enlivens urban space with original decorations. The fountain next to the staircase is a reminder of the location of the first Town Hall, destroyed after bombings on 16 June 1940.

=== Town Hall and Bishopric Gardens ===
Blois achieved independence from the Diocese of Chartres in 1697, and the cathedral was completed by 1700. As a result, the first bishops engineered wide gardens on several levels, next to the premises. Since the destruction of the former Blois town hall during World War II, local authorities requisitioned the bishop's apartments to establish there the new Hôtel de Ville (town hall). Now organised as an urban park, the gardens offer a panoramic view on the downtown, the Loire river, and Blois-Vienne. A statue of Joan of Arc, given to the city by American patron J. Sanford Saltus, stands in the middle of the park. Bishopric gardens are open to public all the year, and a remarkable rose garden can be visited from 15 May and 30 September, each year.

=== Hôtels Particuliers and Timber Framing Houses ===
Since Count Louis II of Orléans became King Louis XII of France in 1498, the city started to host many noblepersons from all the Kingdom. All would build their own mansion as close from the château as they could. King Louis XII also imported Renaissance style from Italy due to his successful military campaigns there. Among these so-called hôtels particuliers, there are:

- the Hôtel d'Alluye;
- the Hôtel d'Amboise;
- the Hôtel de Belot;
- the Hôtel de la Capitainerie (a.k.a. Hôtel de Bretagne);
- the Hôtel de la Chancellerie (i.e.: Chancellery Hotel);
- the Hôtel Denis-Dupont;
- the Hôtel d'Épernon;
- the Hôtel de Guise;
- the Hôtel de Jassaud;
- the Hôtel de Lavallière, built for Louise de Lavallière;
- the Hôtel de Rochefort;
- the Hôtel Sardini;
- the Hôtel Viart;
- the Hôtel de Villebresme, in which Denis Papin lived;
- the Château de la Vicomté (i.e.: Château of Viscounty), in the hamlet of Les Grouëts.

In addition, many citizens from the peoples engineered timber-framing buildings all across the city, including:

- the Logis du Loup;
- the Maison des Acrobates.

Please note all the above edifices have been listed as historical monuments.

=== Blois-Vienne and the Loire river ===
Blois-Vienne (or merely Vienne) is the name given to the southern part of the city, on the left bank of the Loire river. Independent from the city until 1606, there are many traces of the river's past. The main link between both banks is the Jacques-Gabriel Bridge, built in the early 18th century. From the levees circling the surroundings to other abandoned bridges, Vienne has also conserved a harbour, named La Creusille, which is now an urban park right on La Loire à Vélo bike route. Beyond the levees, La Bouillie Park is getting rehabilitated, and actually is a spillway in the event of floodings. Further to the south of the city, the Forêt de Russy is a reminder of the thick woods that once covered the area.

=== Religious buildings ===
The city also is provided with many religious edifices, including:

- Blois Cathedral, dedicated to both Kings Louis IX and Louis XII, built between 1564 and 1700.
- St. Vincent Blois Church, dedicated to Saint Vincent de Paul, built between 1625 and 1660.
- St. Nicholas Blois Church, dedicated to bishop Saint Nicholas of Myra, built in the 12th century.
- Blois-Vienne Church, dedicated to Saint Saturnin of Toulouse, built between c. 1500 and 1528.
- The Basilica of Notre-Dame de la Trinité, dedicated to Our Lady of the Holy Trinity, built between 1932 and 1939.

== Climate ==
Climate data for Blois (1991–2020 normals, extremes 1990–present)
Month	Jan	Feb	Mar	Apr	May	Jun	Jul	Aug	Sep	Oct	Nov	Dec	Year
Record high °C (°F)	16.0 (60.8)	22.9 (73.2)	25.9 (78.6)	28.9 (84.0)	31.9 (89.4)	39.0 (102.2)	41.6 (106.9)	39.5 (103.1)	35.5 (95.9)	30.3 (86.5)	21.9 (71.4)	17.6 (63.7)	41.6 (106.9)
Mean daily maximum °C (°F)	7.4 (45.3)	8.7 (47.7)	12.8 (55.0)	16.1 (61.0)	19.7 (67.5)	23.6 (74.5)	26.2 (79.2)	26.1 (79.0)	22.0 (71.6)	16.8 (62.2)	11.1 (52.0)	7.8 (46.0)	16.5 (61.7)
Daily mean °C (°F)	4.6 (40.3)	5.1 (41.2)	8.1 (46.6)	10.6 (51.1)	14.1 (57.4)	17.6 (63.7)	19.8 (67.6)	19.8 (67.6)	16.3 (61.3)	12.5 (54.5)	7.8 (46.0)	5.0 (41.0)	11.8 (53.2)
Mean daily minimum °C (°F)	1.8 (35.2)	1.5 (34.7)	3.4 (38.1)	5.1 (41.2)	8.5 (47.3)	11.7 (53.1)	13.4 (56.1)	13.4 (56.1)	10.6 (51.1)	8.1 (46.6)	4.5 (40.1)	2.2 (36.0)	7.0 (44.6)
Record low °C (°F)	−13.7 (7.3)	−16.0 (3.2)	−11.0 (12.2)	−5.0 (23.0)	−1.5 (29.3)	0.1 (32.2)	5.1 (41.2)	3.9 (39.0)	2.5 (36.5)	−3.1 (26.4)	−11.7 (10.9)	−11.5 (11.3)	−16.0 (3.2)
Average precipitation mm (inches)	52.5 (2.07)	46.4 (1.83)	47.1 (1.85)	50.8 (2.00)	61.2 (2.41)	51.5 (2.03)	51.7 (2.04)	42.1 (1.66)	49.3 (1.94)	62.0 (2.44)	62.1 (2.44)	64.7 (2.55)	641.4 (25.25)
Average precipitation days (≥ 1.0 mm)	10.3	9.3	9.0	9.2	9.7	8.0	7.6	6.9	7.2	10.0	11.2	11.3	109.6
Mean monthly sunshine hours	62.8	92.8	147.6	187.1	211.3	210.1	230.5	228.4	186.7	121.7	74.5	59.0	1,812.5
Source: Meteociel

== Transport ==
The A10 motorway connects Blois with Paris, Orléans and Tours. Blois Railway Station offers direct connections from Paris, Orléans, Tours, Nantes, and to several regional destinations.

Regular commuting connections exist between Blois and most cities in the surroundings, including:

- Chaumont-sur-Loire (by train),
- Château of Chambord (by bus),
- Montrichard (by bus),
- Vendôme (by bus),
- ZooParc de Beauval (by bus).

== Personalities linked to Blois ==
=== Historical and political figures ===
- Ivomadus (5th century), Breton chieftain who would have conquered Blois and established there an independent Kingdom until Clovis I's conquest.
- Count William of Orléans (died 834), first count of Blois.
- Count Theobald I (913–975), viscount who declared himself Count when Duke Hugh the Great died in 956.
- Thubois (c. 1044–1090)
- Lady Adela of Normandy (c. 1067–1137), daughter of William the Conqueror, married to Stephen II, Count of Blois.
- King Stephen of England (c. 1096–1154), second son of Count Stephen II and Lady Adela, he became King of England from 1135 to 1154.
- Lady Adela of Champagne (c. 1140–1206), daughter of Count Theobald IV of Blois, she married King Louis VII and gave to him future King Philip II.
- Duke Charles of Blois (1319–1364), notable stakeholder during the Hundred Years' War.
- King Louis XII (1462–1515), Count of Blois from 1465 to 1498, then King of France up to 1515.
- Queen Anne of Brittany (1477–1514), last Queen of Brittany, she remarried King Louis XII in 1499, then moved to Blois until her death.
- King Francis I (1494–1547), King of France born in Cognac, but he lived in Blois since his marriage in 1506 with Louis XII and Anne's daughter.
- Queen Catherine de' Medici (1519–1589), Queen consort of France, who died in the Château of Blois.
- Queen Marie de' Medici (1575–1642) was exiled to the Château of Blois by her son, King Louis XIII.
- Duke Henry I of Guise (1550–1588), assassinated on 23 December 1588 in the château.
- Duke Gaston of Orléans (1494 in Fontainebleau – 1547), uncle of King Louis XVI, he got establishment in the château, and died there.
- Jean Morin (1591–1659), theologian and biblical scholar of Protestant parents
- Michel V Bégon (1638–1710), officier de plume of the French Navy.
- Marie Anne de Bourbon (1666–1739), also known as Mademoiselle de Blois, daughter of King Louis XIV.
- Michel VI Bégon de la Picardière, (1669–1747). Commissioner in the French Navy; intendant of New France and Le Havre.
- Anne-Marie de Bernard de la Fosse (1896-1971), World War II resistant
- Thomas de Mahy, Marquis de Favras (1744–1790), royalist
- Jean-Marie Pardessus (1772–1853).
- Joseph Léopold Sigisbert Hugo (1773–1828).
- Eugène Riffault (1803–1888).
- Joséphine Marchais (1842–1874).
- Émile Laurens (1884–1940).
- Georges Litalien (1896–1952), deputee of the Loir-et-Cher department.
- Henri de La Vaissière (1901–1944).
- Pierre Sudreau (1919–2012).
- Jack Lang (1939–).
- Bernard Boucault. Préfet de Police in Paris (from 2012 to 2015).

=== Artists ===
- Pierre de Ronsard (1524–1585), poet from Vendôme but he met his muse Cassandre in the Château of Blois in 1549.
- Jacob Bunel (1568–1614), Bloisian painter who studied in the Royal School of Fontainebleau.
- Antoine Boësset (1587–1643), composer of secular music, and superintendent of music at the Ancien Régime French court.
- Jean Monier (1600–1656), painter close to Queen Marie de' Medici.
- Étienne Baudet (1638–1711), engraver born in Vineuil.
- Pierre Monier (1641–1703), painter and son of Jean Monier.
- Jacques Gabriel (1667–1742), Parisian architect who designed the Jacques-Gabriel Bridge in Blois.
- Jean-Eugène Robert-Houdin (1805–1871), watchmaker, magician and illusionist, widely recognized as the father of the modern style of conjuring.
- Ulysse Besnard (1826–1899), painter, then ceramist.
- Daniel Dupuis (1849–1899), painter, sculptor and medal artist.
- Jules Contant (1852–1920), painter born in Blois-Vienne, son of a politician.
- Émile Gaucher (1858–1909), sculptor.
- Alfred Jean Halou (1875–1939), sculptor from Blois, who designed the Franco-Prussian War memorial in Blois.
- Étienne Gaudet (1891–1963), engraver and painter from Nevers but who lived and died in Blois.
- Bernard Lorjou (1908–1986), painter.
- Claudine Doury (born 1959), photographer.
- Jean-Louis Agobet (born 1968), composer.
- Christian Jui (born 1973), poet.
- Niro (born 1987), rapper born in Orléans but he grew up and currently lives in Blois.
- Hildegarde Fesneau (born 1995), violinist.

=== Artisans ===
During the 16th and 17th centuries, Blois was the hometown of many artisans in the watchmaking and goldsmithing industries. Among them:

- Julien Coudray, who was one of the first watchmakers in Blois according to Tardy, worked for Kings Louis XII and Francis I. There is a street in Blois that holds his name.
- the Cuper family: the Louvre museum, Paris, possesses two watches made by Michel Cuper, and two other ones by P. Cuper. A street also holds their name in the city.
- the Bellanger family: Martin with a first wife got 2 sons born between 1594 and 1597 (among them, one was called Isaac), then at least 3 other ones with a Suzanne, named Pierre (born in 1603), Jean (married in 1641 and dead in 1678), and Théophile.
- Guillaume Couldroit, from whom the British Museum, London, has a table clock.
- Jacques de la Garde, from whom the British Museum has a striking clock, and from whom a table clock can be found in the National Museum of the Renaissance in Écouen, France.
- Charles Perras, from whom 2 watches can be found in the British Museum, as well as in the Victoria and Albert Museum.
- the Duduict brothers.
- Blaise Foucher, Duduict's disciple, from whom the British Museum possesses one watchcase.
- the Vautier family, among whom the British Museum has several Louis' watchcases.
- the Gribelin family, among whom Simon was watchmaker and engraver for the King, and his son Abraham (1589–1671) succeeded to him. Nowadays, the Louvre Museum has a watch made by Abraham.
- the Girard family, among whom Marc came from the Netherlands and established in Blois, his son Théodore and grandson Marc II were both watchmakers.
- Christophe Morlière (born in Orléans in 1604 – 1643), who moved to Blois. By 1632, he was ordered a watch for Lady Marguerite of Lorraine when she married Gaston, Duke of Orléans and Count of Blois.
- Pierre Brisson.
- Paul Viet, from whom the British Museum got a painted watchcase.
- Jean Bonbruict, from whom the British Museum has a silver coach watch.
- Nicolas Lemaindre, who was watchmaker and valet for Queen Catherine de' Medici. The British Museum also possesses one of his works, as well as the Louvre and the Victoria and Albert Museum.
- Pierre Landré, from whom a watch is visible in the Metropolitan Museum of Art, in New York City.
- the Chartier family, among whom Pierre had a son registered as T. Chartier in the Louvre where a cylindrical table clock is exposed.
- François Laurier.
- Londonian watchmaker Henry Massy was son of Nicolas Massy, born in Blois.
- Robert Vauquer, who has now 2 watches in the Louvre and 1 in the Walters Art Gallery, Baltimore.

=== Intellectuals ===
- Peter of Blois (c. 1130 – c. 1211), theologian, poet and diplomat born in Blois.
- Paul Reneaulme (c. 1560 – c. 1624), doctor and botanist born in the city.
- Florimond de Beaune (1601–1652), jurist and mathematician born in Blois.
- René-Robert Cavelier, Sieur de La Salle (1643–1687), first explorer of Louisiana, born in Rouen, then teacher at the Royal College of Blois.
- Denis Papin (1647–1713), physicist, mathematician and inventor from Blois.
- Angel Baffard (1655–1726), genealogist specialist of Bloisian.
- Jean Marie Pardessus (1772–1853), lawyer.
- Augustin Thierry (1795–1856), historian born in the city.
- Amédée Thierry (1797–1873), historian like his elder brother, and journalist.
- Félix Duban (1798–1870), Parisian architect who restored the Château of Blois.
- Louis de La Saussaye (1801–1878), numismatist and historian from Blois.
- Jules de La Morandière (1813–1905), architect, and Duban's disciple.
- Victor-Auguste Poulain (1825–1918), chocolatier who created the Chocolat Poulain brand in 1848.
- Albert Poulain (1851–1937), chocolatier and industrialist, son of the precedent.
- Tiburce Colonna-Ceccaldi (1832–1892), diplomat and archaeologist born in Blois.
- Édouard Blau (1836–1906), dramatist and opera librettist from Blois.
- Arthur Trouëssart (1839–1929), architect, historian, and genealogist specialized in Bloisian history.
- Adrien Thibault (1844–1918), ceramist born in La Chaussée-Saint-Victor, then historian of Bloisian.
- René Guénon (also Sheikh 'Abd al-Wahid Yahya; 1886 – 1951), author, philosopher, social critic, the founder of the Traditionalist School.
- Philippe Ariès (1914–1984), medievalist and historian.
- Albert Ronsin (1928–2007), 20th-century French scholar, historian, librarian, and curator.
- Françoise Xenakis (1930–2018), novelist and journalist.
- Maxime Schwartz (born 1940), molecular biologist who has been a research director at the CNRS, and Director General of the Pasteur Institute.
- Henri Tézenas du Montcel (1943–1994), economist
- Pierre Rosanvallon (born 1948), historian and sociologist.
- Christophe Lebreton (1950–1996), Trappist monk and one of the Tibhirine monks.
- Luc Foisneau (born in 1963), philosopher and director of research at CNRS.

=== Sportspersons ===
- Marcel Lehoux (1888–1936), racing driver
- Philippe Gondet (1942–2018), footballer.
- Frédéric Sausset (born 1969), racing driver
- Bruno Girard (born 1970), boxer
- Nicolas Vogondy (born 1977), cyclist.
- Sonia Bompastor (born 1980), female footballer.
- Aly Cissokho (born 1987), footballer of Senegalese descent.
- Bernard Onanga Itoua (born 1988), footballer.
- Alexis Khazzaka (born 1994), Lebanese footballer.
- Corentin Jean (born 1995), footballer.
- Alpha Kaba (born 1996), basketball player

== International relations ==
Blois is twinned with:

- Waldshut-Tiengen, Germany, since 30 June 1963
- Weimar, Germany, since 18 February 1995
- Lewes, United Kingdom, since 30 June 1963
- Sighişoara, Romania, since 18 November 1995
- Urbino, Italy, since 1 May 2003 ("friendship protocol")
- Huế, Vietnam, since 23 May 2007
- Azrou, Morocco, since July 2011 (protocol of cooperation)

== Fictional references ==
Athos, the count of La Fère (from Alexandre Dumas' The Three Musketeers) has a castle in Blois, in Twenty Years After, and The Vicomte de Bragelonne (from the same author).
