= Pardessus =

Pardessus may refer to:

- Pardessus de viole, a bowed string instrument
- any descant instrument
- Jean-Marie Pardessus (1772–1853), French lawyer
- Pardessus, a type of overcoat; see 1830s in Western fashion § Outerwear
