= Henri Tézenas du Montcel =

French economist

Director of HEC Paris
- In office 1992–1994
- Preceded by: Michel Faucon

Personal details
- Born: January 8, 1943 Blois, France
- Died: December 2, 1994 (aged 51)
- Education: Collège Stanislas de Paris

Henri Tézenas du Montcel (January 8, 1943, Blois–December 2, 1994) was a French economist.

== Biography ==
Henri Tézenas du Montcel is the son of René Tézenas du Montcel, mining engineer, and Suzanne Desjoyeaux. He received his doctorate in economics in 1970 and was a university professor in economics and management in 1973.

Henri Tézenas participated in the founding of the Dauphine University Center (future Paris IX University) in 1968. He is a professor of human resources management and microeconomics. He chaired Paris-Dauphine University from 1980 to 1984, and strengthened its reputation in higher management education. He created the DESS 212 International Affairs (currently Master 212) of which he was responsible from 1985 to 1989, as well as the Economic and Social Research Group (GRES).

He chaired Radio France Internationale from 1986 to 1989. He was then president of the HEC Group from January 1992 to 1994.

Shortly before his death, in 1994 he founded and chaired the national association l'Envol, which organizes free stays and programs for seriously ill children and their families.

He died in December 1994 from cancer.
