= Anne-Marie de Bernard de la Fosse =

Member of the French Resistance

Anne-Marie de Bernard de la Fosse (1894–1971), nicknamed and called Souris, was a French participant in the resistance against the occupation of France by Nazi Germany during World War II. Souris assisted agents of Britain's Special Operations Executive (SOE) to create resistance groups and to receive arms and equipment from England via parachute and clandestine landings by British planes. In September 1943, Souris was captured by the Germans and imprisoned in Ravensbrück concentration camp. She survived the war.

== Early life ==
Anne-Marie Denisane (or Ynisan), called "Souris" (Mouse), was born to a wealthy family on 6 September 1894 in Ouchamps, Loir-et-Cher, France.In 1921, she married an Englishman, William Gardnor-Beard. That same year Gardnor-Beard bought a chateau, modest in size compared to many in the Loire Valley, in the hamlet of Nanteuil, across the Loire River from the city of Blois. This is in a region of France known as the Sologne, famous for wild boar and deer hunting. The couple had two children: Muriel, called Moune, and Beatrice, called Betty. An English nanny, Netta Cox (born 1899), always called just "Nanny", began working for the couple in 1925 and remained at the chateau until her death in 1992.

Souris and her husband created a school in their chateau for young Englishmen to study French. Their students included a number of prominent persons, Henry Wellesley who became the Duke of Wellington, racing driver Richard Seaman, diplomat Robert Cecil, and soldier Bill Bradford. In 1938, Willam Gardenor-Beard died.

== World War II ==
World War II began in 1939 and British language students ceased coming to the chateau. In May 1940, Nazi Germany invaded France. On 14 June, the Germans dropped bombs near the chateau. Hundreds of thousand of French people fled their homes and headed south, attempting to escape the advancing German army. On 17 June, the Gardnor-Beard family joined the exodus, with family and servants packed into three automobiles. Stymied by the clogged roads, a week later they returned to the chateau. Both French and German soldiers had sacked the place. Two companies of the German army were camped out on the grounds and German officers occupied some of the bedrooms. The family resumed their life as best they could. Souris became a volunteer for the Red Cross which gave her an all-important pass permitting her to travel in the region. The family sheltered a Jewish refugee and persuaded the French authorities to leave English woman "Nanny" Cox off the list of foreigners in the area, a list required by the Germans. That prevented Nanny from being interned as a foreign enemy. Two days after their return to the chateau, Souris married Count Pierre Marie Marcel de Bernard de la Fosse, known as Berbert.

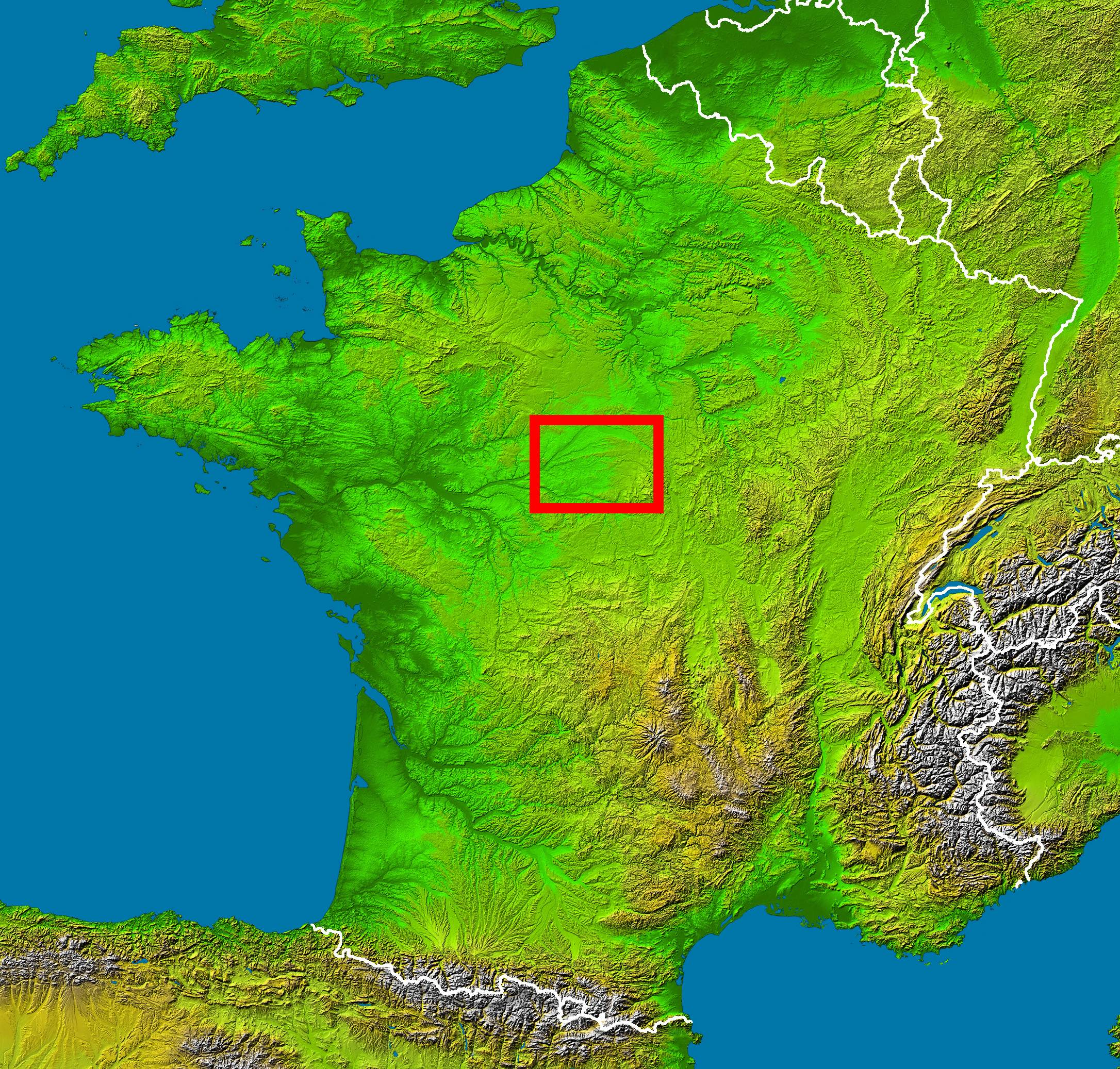
De Bernard's chateau and resistance activities were in the area known as the Sologne.

=== The Resistance ===
In November 1940, Souris was approached in Blois by a man she didn't know who asked her if she would help England fight Germany. She said yes and was given a password, "Urbain vingt-six" (Urbain 26). Early in 1941, she was approached by a "funny little man" named Pierre Culioli, a former prisoner-of-war of the Germans. He asked her for help to get him to England to join the British fighting the Germans. She said she couldn't help him. Nothing more happened until late 1942, when a man on a bicycle arrived at the chateau and said "Urbain vignt-six." This was Gilbert Norman, an agent of the British Special Operations Executive (SOE). He asked her for help locating landing grounds for clandestine air flights from England. She contacted the owner of a nearby chateau who declined to allow flights to land on his property. In early 1943, Pierre Culioli came back to the chateau. He brought with him Yvonne Rudellat, code named "Jacqueline", who had recently arrived from England. She was the first female saboteur sent by SOE to work in the Sologne. Norman, Culioli, and Rudellat were frequent visitors to the chateau during the next few months.

Souris helped Culioli and Rudellat find landing sites for clandestine SOE flights and for locations where arms and equipment could be parachuted in to be used by the Resistance for what was to be a future uprising against the German occupation. Due to the large hunting estates and forests in the Sologne it became a favorite location for SOE flights and Culioli and Rudellat were successful in creating several groups of resisters who carried out small-time sabotage operations. They called themself the Adolph Network, a mocking reference to Adolf Hitler. They were affiliated with the much larger Prosper network headed by SOE agent Francis Suttill.

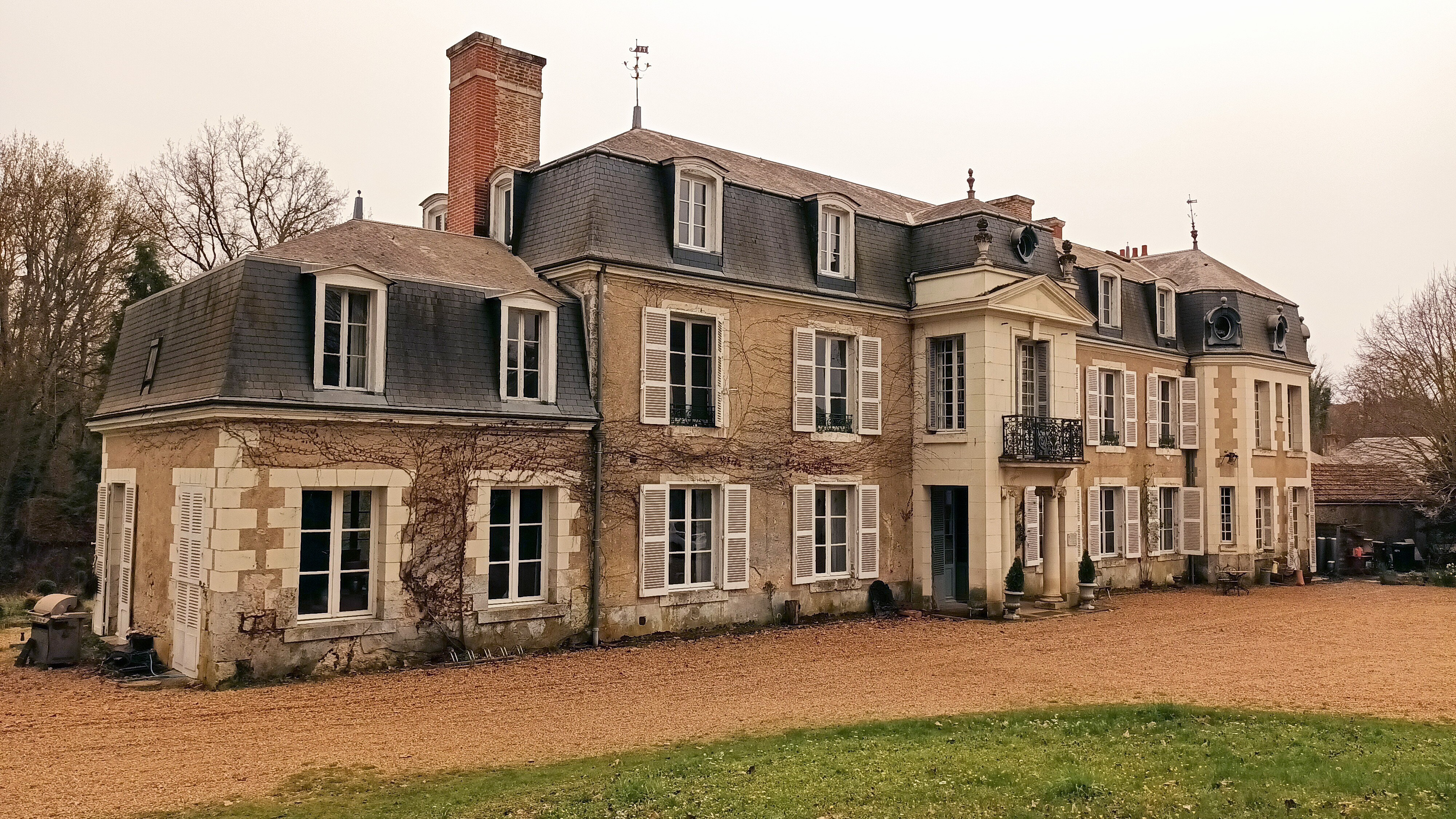
The Chateau de Nanteuil

The downfall for Souris, Culioli, and Rudellat began on the night of 12/13 June 1943. Souris was at the site, 7 km (4.3 miles) east of Chateau Nantueil where arms and ammunition were dropped by parachute. One of the containers exploded on contact with the ground. The sound was heard by "Nanny" at Nanteuil. Souris and the twenty people at the drop site quickly dispersed, afraid that the Germans in the area would be alerted by the explosion. Souris made it home "filthy and soaked." The explosion was the beginning of the end of the end for the Adolph network. Culioli asked Suttill to suspend the near-nightly flights to the Solongne due to the attention caused by the explosion. Suttill declined and the flights continued. On the morning of 21 June Culioli and Rudellat were captured by the Germans. Rudellat was wounded by a bullet to the brain which impacted her cognitive ability. Their capture was the first in arrests of dozens of SOE agents and hundreds of Frence resisters in most of northern France.

On 9 September, Souris's husband Bebert was arrested by the Germans and the chateau was searched. He had been little active in the Resistance. On 16 September Souris journeyed to Blois to inquire of the Germans about the fate of her husband. She was arrested.

== Imprisoned ==
Souris de Bernard was imprisoned first at Romainville, but on 31 January 1944 she was deported to Ravensbrück concentration camp in Germany. Ravensbrück was the only German concentration camp for women with tens of thousands of inmates. Souris was required to wear a red triangle of cloth on her left arm or breast, signifying that she was a political prisoner Eleven thousand French women were imprisoned in Ravensbrück and 8,000 of them died. Souris was saved along with 300 other French women in January 1945 when the Swedish Red Cross secured their release and took them to Sweden on the White Buses. Souris was emaciated and could barely stand.

== Home again ==
Back at the Chateau Nantieul, Souris organized annual dinners on 21 June for the Adolph Network survivors in honor of Yvonne Rudellat who was captured on that date and died in prison. Souris was given the Legion d'honeur in 1955 by the French government. A memorial in Romorantin-Lanthenay honors the name of four SOE agents who were captured in the Sologne and later killed or died in concentration camps. Souris died in February 1971, twelve years after the death of her husband, Bebert.
