= Jean-Marie Pardessus =

French lawyer

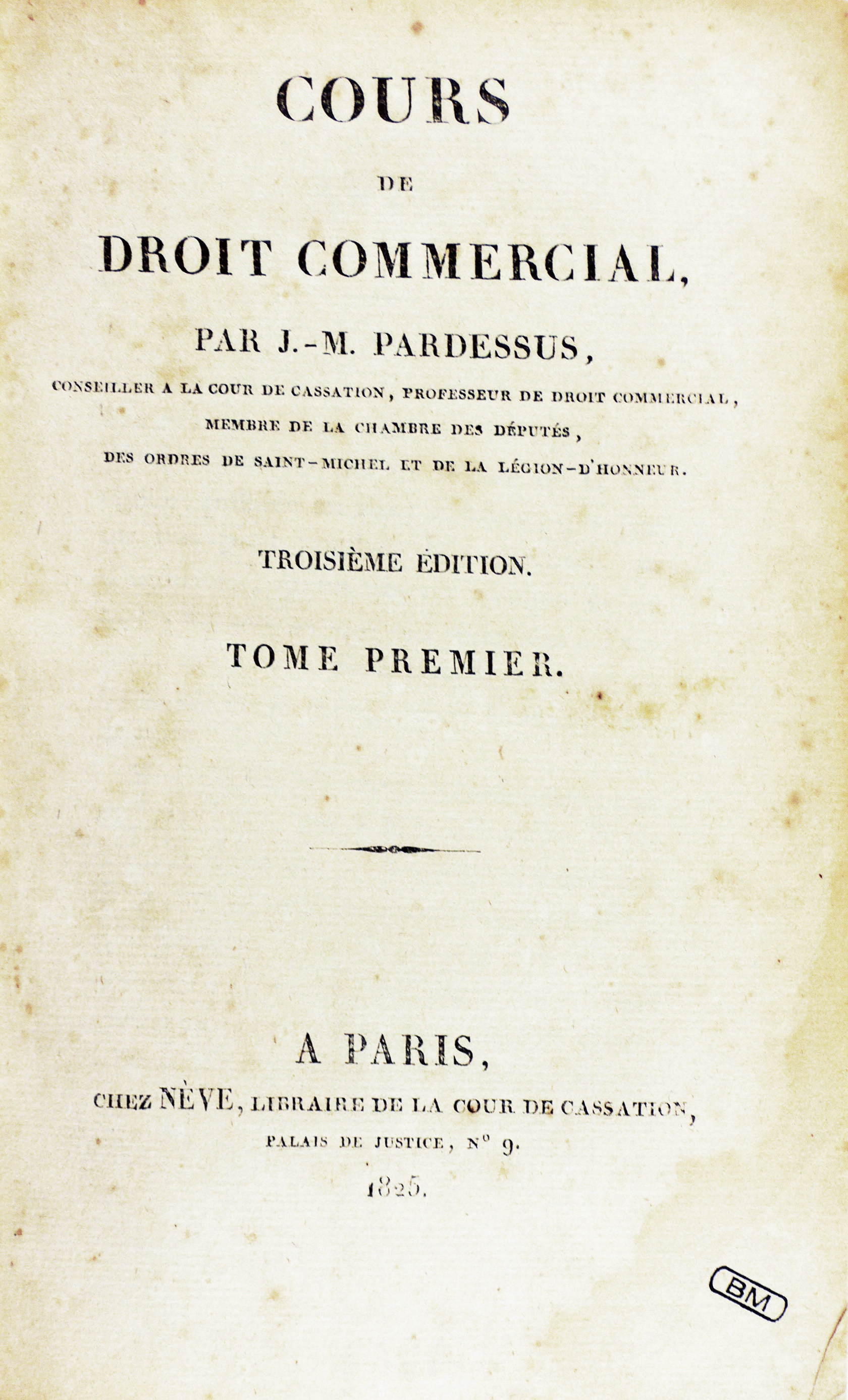
Cours de droit commercial, 1825

Jean Marie Pardessus (August 11, 1772 – May 27, 1853) was a French lawyer.

== Life ==
He was born in Blois, and educated by the Oratorians. He then studied law, initially under his father, a lawyer at the Presidial, who was a pupil of Robert Joseph Pothier. In 1796, after the Reign of Terror, Pardessus married, but his wife died after three years. A widower at the age of twenty-seven, he refused to remarry in order to spare his children a stepmother.

His Traité des servitudes (1806) went through eight editions, and his Traité du contrat et des lettres de change (1809) pointed him out as suitable for the chair of commercial law recently formed at the faculty of law at Paris. The emperor, however, had insisted that the position should be open to competition. Pardessus entered (1810) and was successful over two other candidates, André MJJ Dupin and Persil, who afterwards became brilliant lawyers.

His lectures were published under the title Cours de droit commercial (4 volumes, 1813–1817). In 1815 Pardessus was elected deputy for the department of Loir-et-Cher, and from 1820 to 1830 was constantly re-elected; then, however, he refused to take the oath of allegiance to Louis Philippe, and was deprived of his office. After the publication of the first volume of his Collection des lois maritimes antérieures au XVIIIème siècle (1828) he was elected a member of the Academie des Inscriptions et Belles Lettres.

He continued his collection of maritime laws (4 vols., 1828–1845), and published Les us et coutumes de la mer (2 volumes, 1847). He also brought out two volumes of Merovingian diplomas (Diplomata, chartae, epistolae, leges, 1843–1849); volumes iv.-vi. of the Table chronologique des diplômes; and volume xxi. of Ordonnances des rois de France (1849), preceded by an Essai sur l'ancienne organisation judiciaire, which was reprinted in part in 1851. In 1843 Pardessus published a critical edition of the Loi salique, followed by 14 dissertations, which greatly advanced the knowledge of the subject. He died at Pimpeneau near Blois.
