= Albert Poulain =

French chocolatier (1851–1937)

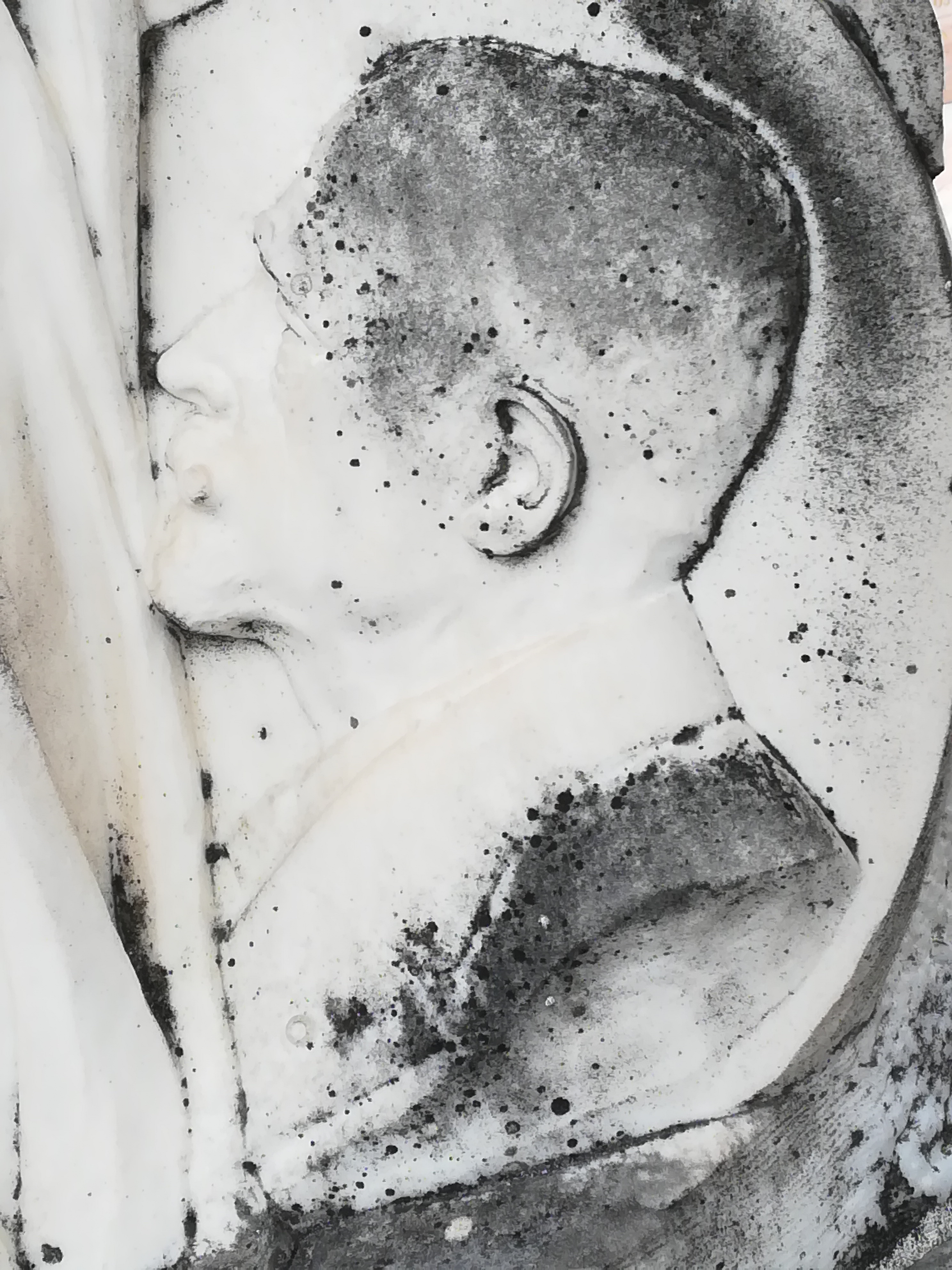
Portrait of Albert Poulain, on his tomb.

Albert Poulain (February 6, 1851 – January 6, 1937) was a French chocolatier and industrialist who directed Chocolat Poulain from 1874 to 1893. He was also the first president of the Chamber of commerce of Loir-et-Cher from 1896 to 1920.

== See also ==
- Victor-Auguste Poulain
