= Victor-Auguste Poulain =

French chocolatier

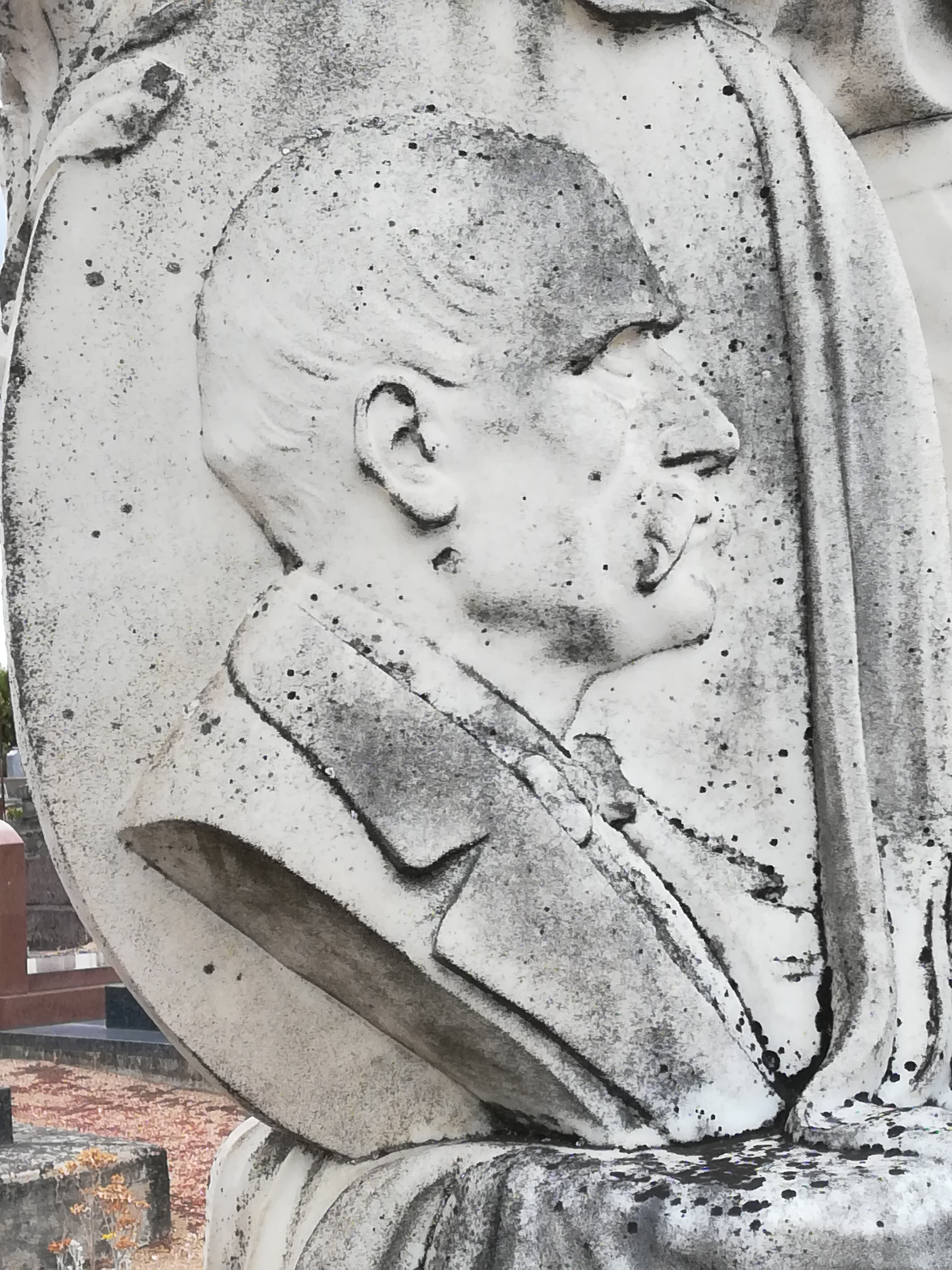
Victor-Auguste Poulain

Victor-Auguste Poulain (February 11, 1825 - July 30, 1918) was a French chocolatier and industrialist who founded the Chocolat Poulain brand in 1848.

== See also ==
- Albert Poulain
