= Saint Louis Cathedral of Blois =

Blois Cathedral
- Saint Louis Cathedral of Blois
- Cathédrale Saint-Louis de Blois
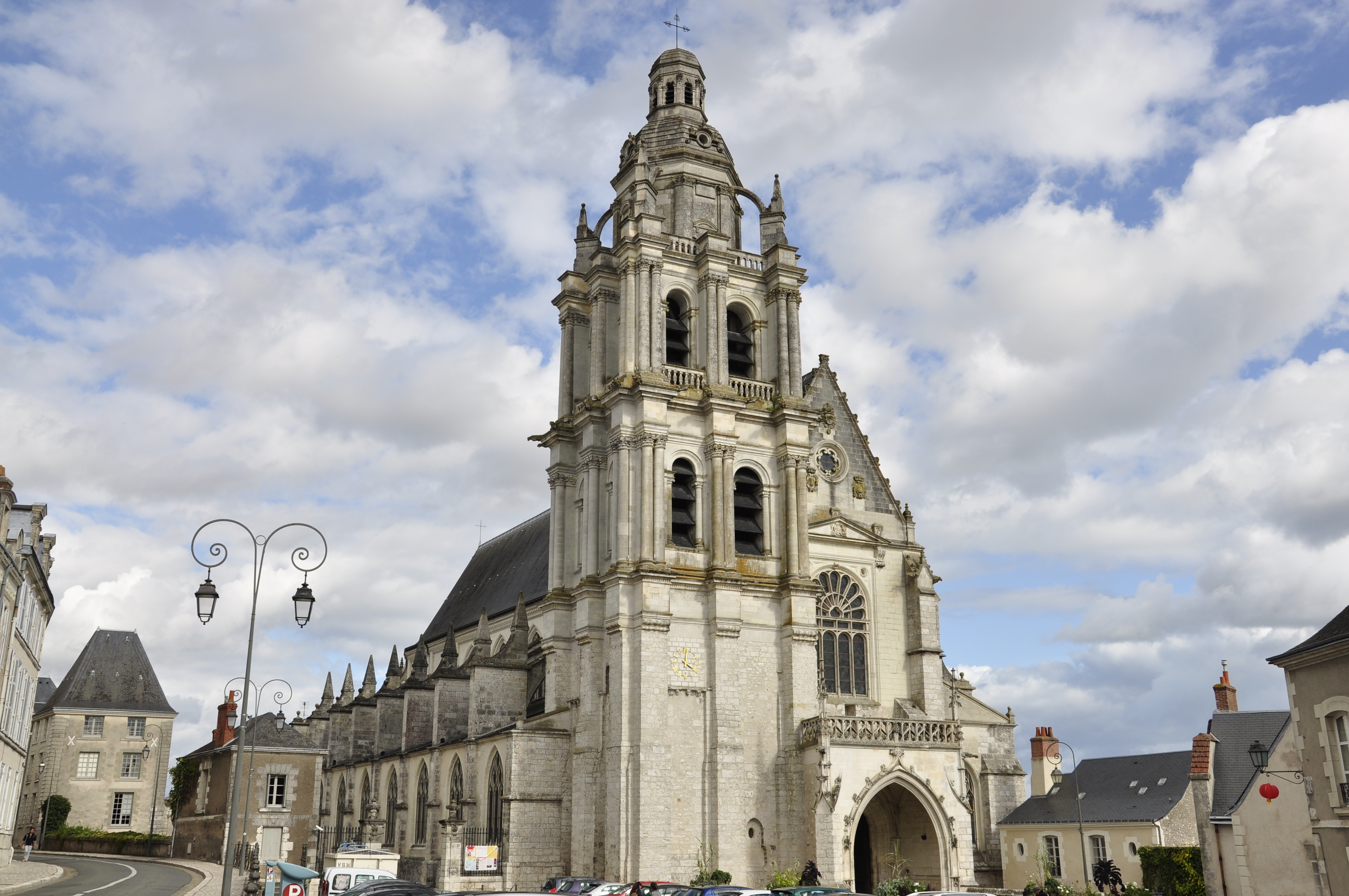
- Blois Cathedral
- Blois Cathedral
- 47.5884°N 1.3365°W
- Location: Blois, Loir-et-Cher, Centre-Val de Loire
- Country: France
- Denomination: Catholic

History
- Status: Cathedral

Architecture
- Heritage designation: Monument historique
- Style: French Gothic
- Groundbreaking: 1544
- Completed: 1700

Monument historique
- Official name: Cathédrale Saint-Louis
- Type: Cathédrale
- Designated: 1906
- Reference no.: PA00098336

Blois Cathedral (French: cathédrale de Blois), or the Saint Louis Cathedral of Blois (French: cathédrale Saint-Louis de Blois), is a Late Gothic Catholic cathedral in Blois, Centre-Val de Loire, France. It has been a monument historique (a national heritage site of France) since 1906.

It is the seat of the Diocese of Blois, established in 1697.

== History ==
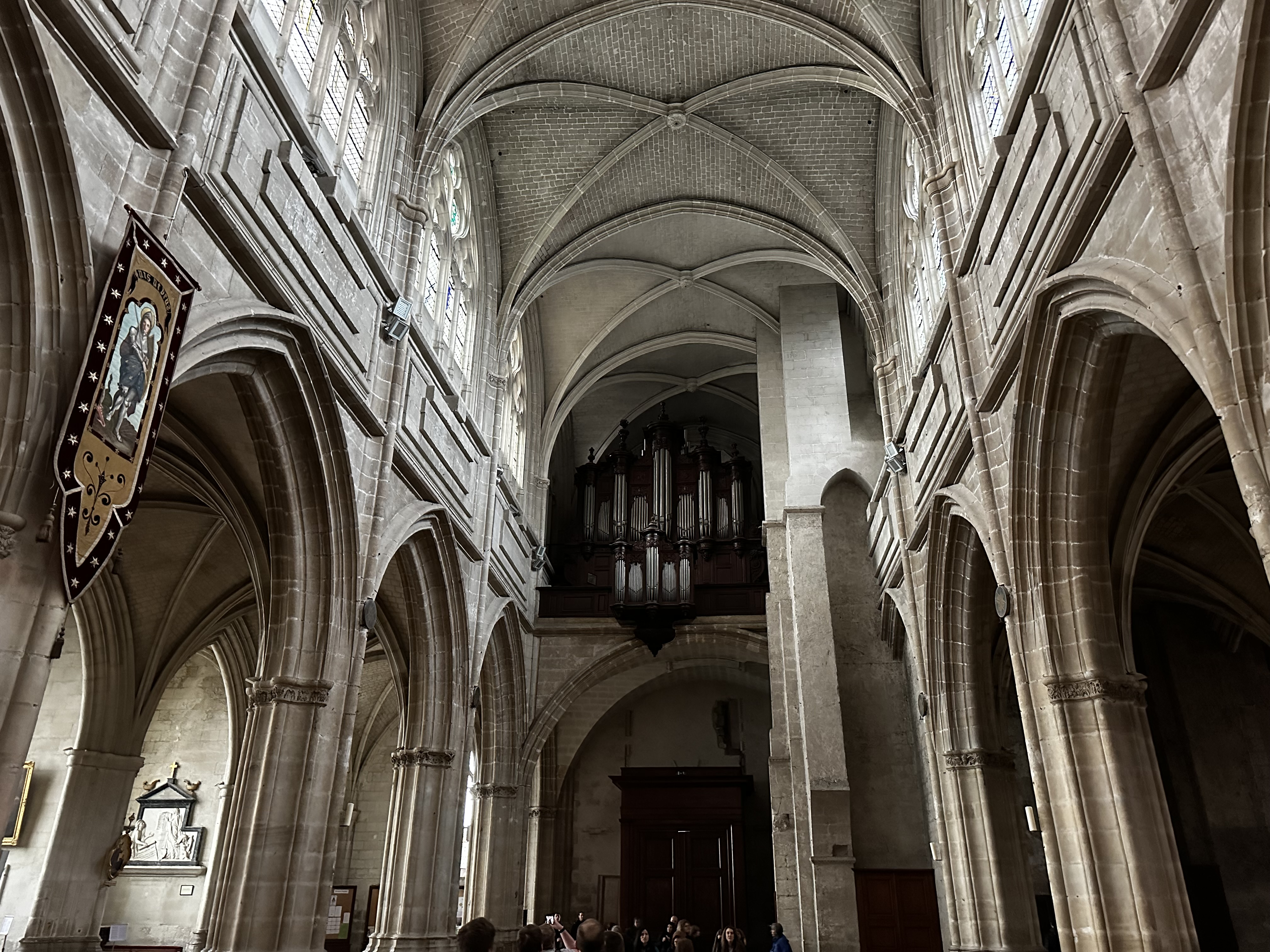
A view of the west end of the church, with the organ being off-center due to the intrusion of the bell tower.

The cathedral is in the Late Gothic style. Before becoming a cathedral, the building was a collegiate church dedicated to Saint Solenne. Construction began in the 12th century. However, except for traces in the crypt and in the base of the bell-tower, nothing is left of the original structure. Construction on the current facade and bell-tower was begun in 1544. The nave was destroyed in a 1678 storm, and the reconstruction in Gothic style took place between 1680 and 1700 under the direction of the architect Arnoult-Séraphin Poictevin (d. 1720). This project was begun at the instigation of Jean-Baptiste Colbert, whose wife was a native of Blois.

To celebrate the church's elevation to cathedral status in 1697, Louis XIV presented the organ console in 1704. The new see thereupon took the dedication to Saint Louis.

The Chapel of Notre-Dame was added in 1860, under the direction of Jules de La Morandière.

American bombardment during World War II destroyed most of the glass-work in the cathedral. On December 22, 2000, new stained-glass windows were dedicated, the work of the Dutch artist Jan Dibbets and the French master glass-worker Jean Mauret. This work was done as part of a general restoration project begun in 1985. The new windows cover thirty-three bays, upper and lower, and have a combined surface area of over 360m^{2}.

== West front ==
The current west front, dating from the middle of the 16th century, represents a compromise between the Late Gothic and early Neoclassical styles. Represented are such medieval elements as gargoyles, pinnacled buttresses, and a pointed gable. The Neoclassical elements include the triangular pediment and the medallions in the round found in the spandrels.

The most notable feature is the bell-tower on the north façade, which dominates the skyline of the town. Although the foundations date to the 12th century, construction on the current tower began in 1544. The tower is in the Renaissance style, with Ionic and Corinthian columns. The uppermost story is topped with a dome and lantern-tower added in 1603. This dome appears to be a replica of the domes on top of the towers of Tours Cathedral.

The tower holds seven bells tuned to C, D, E, F, G, C# and D#.

== The Interior ==
The cathedral consists of a long nave with side aisles running along the north and south. Side chapels open onto the aisles. There is also a chancel with its ambulatory. There is no transept.

=== The Chancel ===
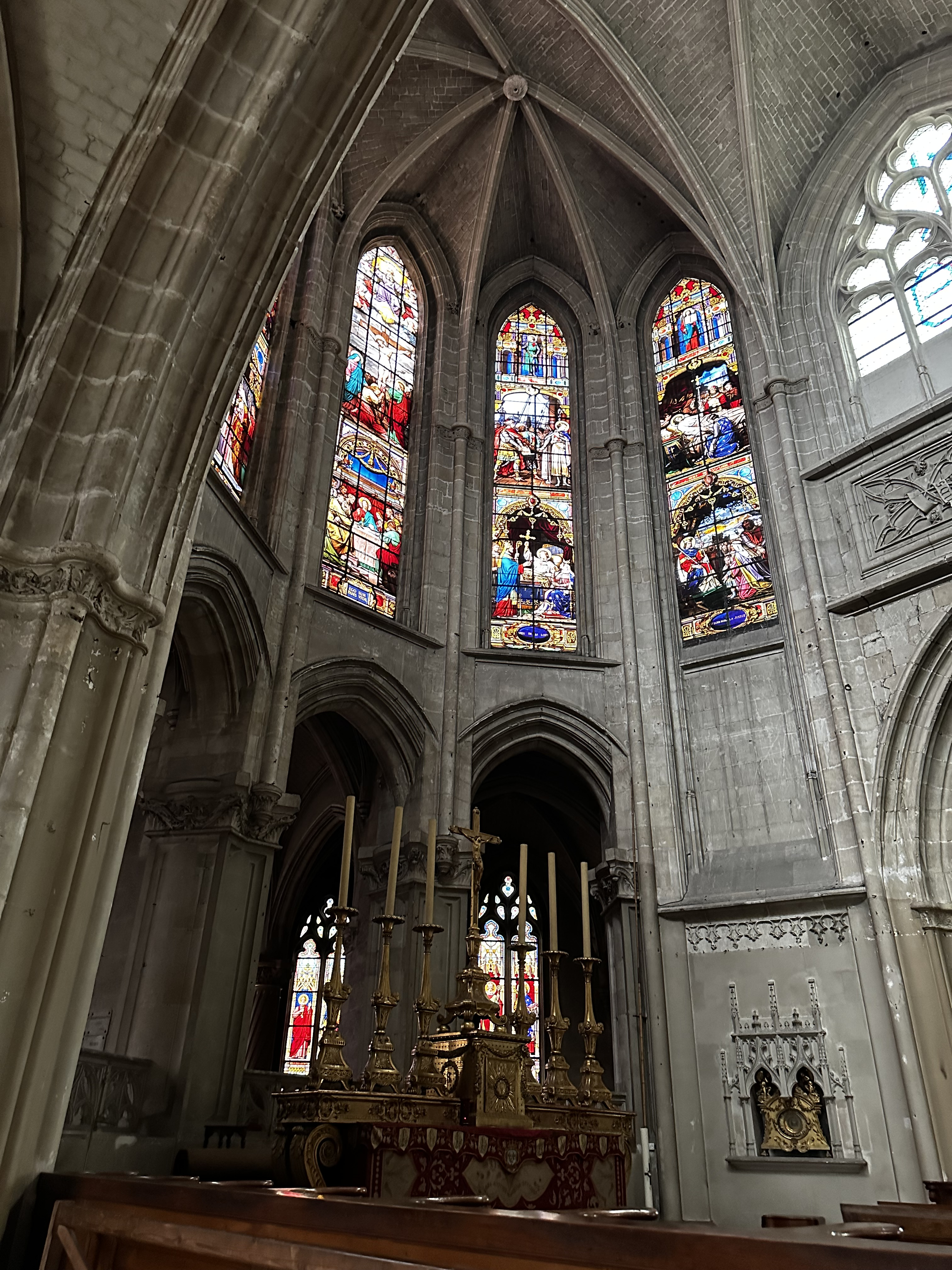
The apse and high altar of the cathedral

The chancel has a pentagonal apse from the 16th and 17th centuries. Surrounding the chancel is the ambulatory with its apsidal chapels dating from the 19th century. The upper windows retain their stained glass by the 19th century artist Lobin.

The ambulatory, which was not added until the 1860s, displays twisted pillars in a pastiche of the Louis XII style, an example of the architectural imitation that was common during the Second Empire.

=== The Nave and Side Chapels ===
After the storm in 1678, only the façade, the apse, and the pillars in the chancel were retained. It was at this time that the sanctuary was first given a rib vault.

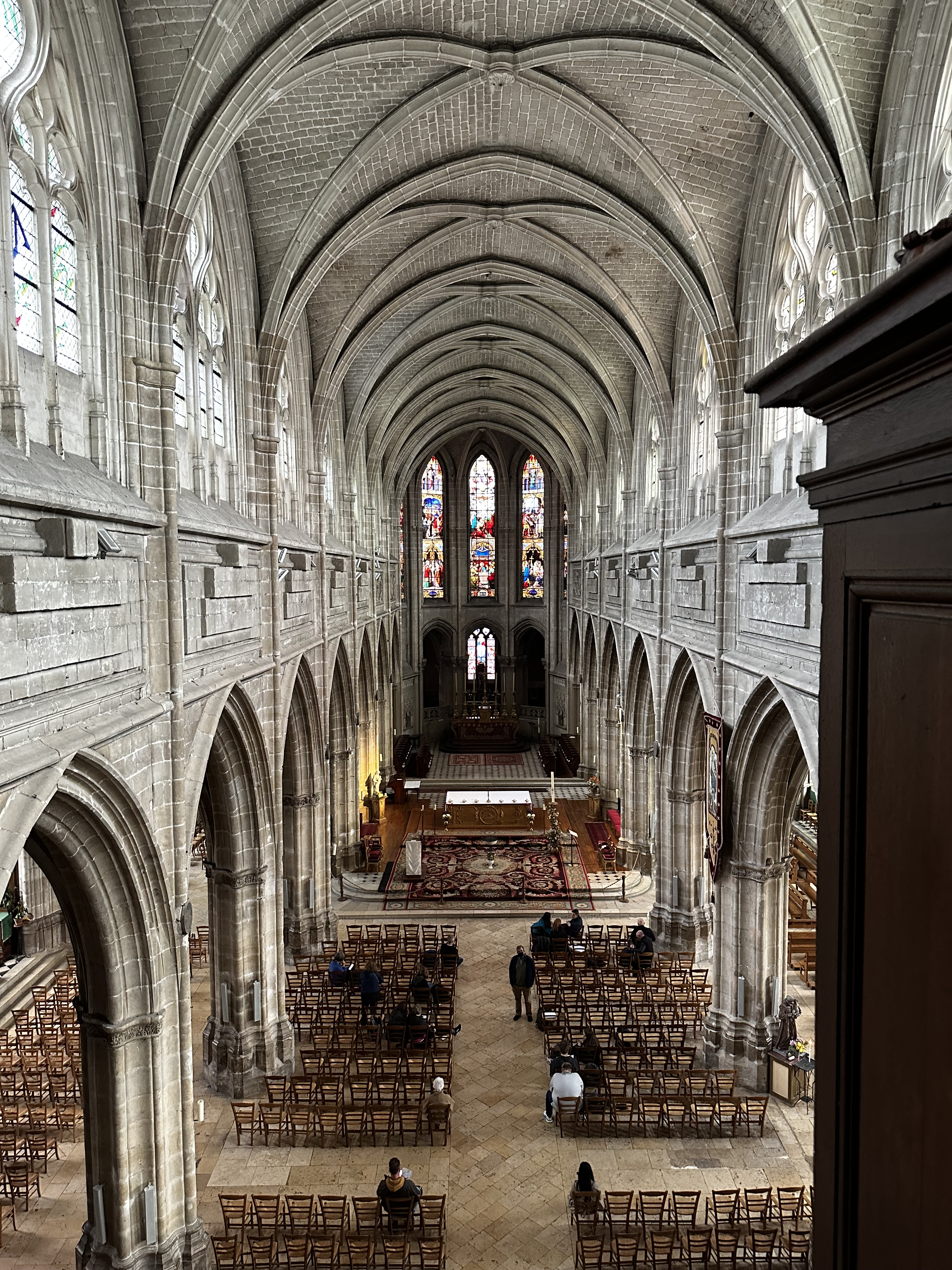
The nave of the cathedral as seen from the organ loft

The church has but one ancient chapel, dating from the 12th century, and situated to the left of the nave beneath the tower. The chapel has a period rib vault which rests on capitals in the form of acanthus leaves. Across from the old chapel, the first chapel on the right side of the nave contains a bas-relief in marble that depicts the baptism of Christ, which was recovered from the tomb of the mother of the King of Poland and Duke of Lorraine Stanislas Leszczynski, who died in Blois.

The cathedral contains another white marble bas-relief, called Memory and Meditation, which is the work of Louis II Lerambert and dates to 1660. The Clicquot organ console was given by Louis XIV in 1704.

=== The Crypt ===
The Crypt of Saint Solenne is located beneath the chancel. Traces of a Carolingian church were discovered there in 1927. That structure is thought to have been built toward the end of the 10th century by the Counts of Blois to house the relics of Saint Solenne, Bishop of Chartres. In the 12th century, upon the building of the new church, the chancel of the Carolingian structure was converted into a crypt.

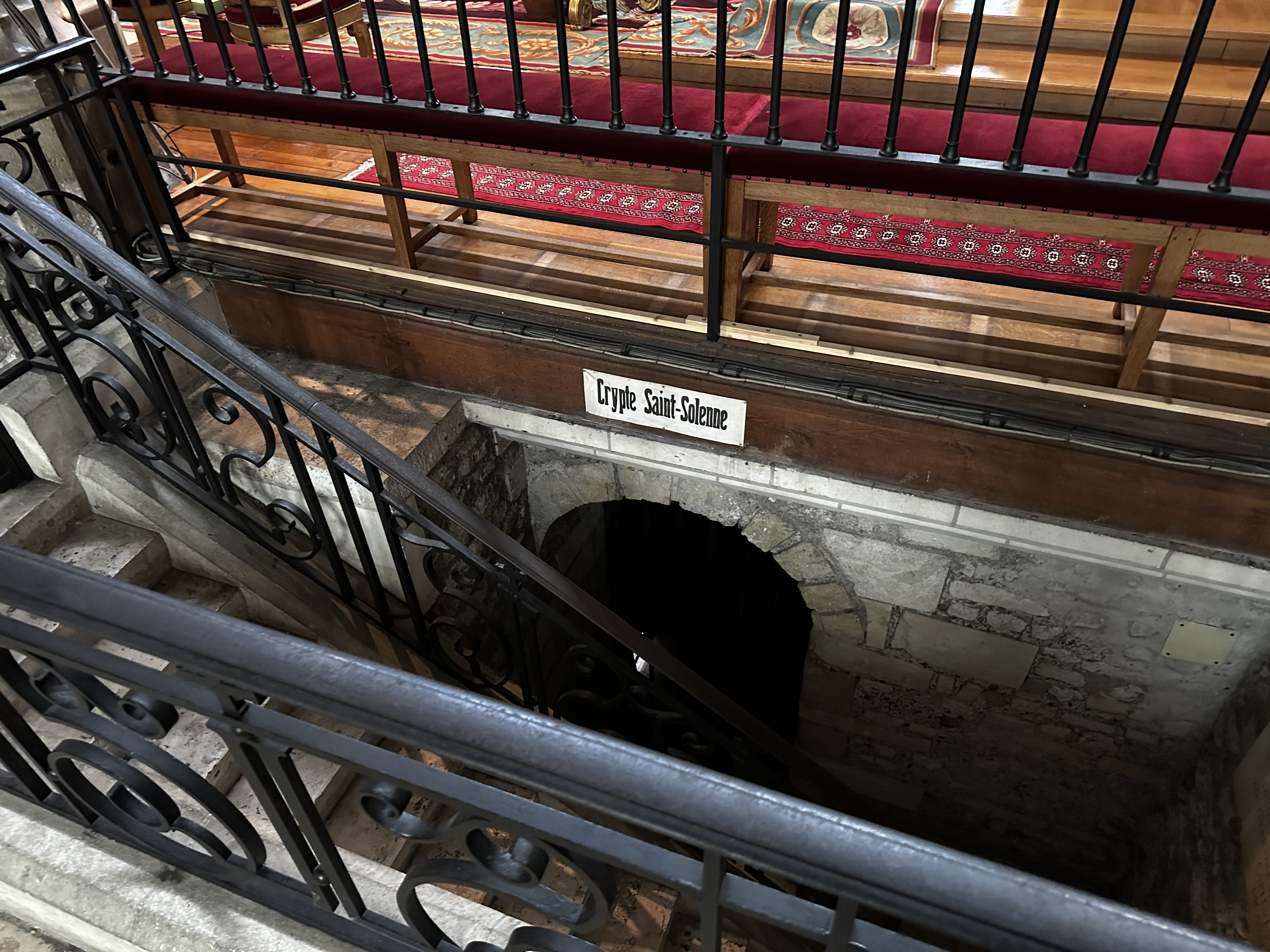
The entrance to the crypt

Only parts of the nave and apse of the original church remain visible in the crypt. Traces of the semi-circular apse can be seen behind the altar. On the left side of the aisle is a vault containing the tombs of the Bishops of Blois.

== Sources ==
- Pérouse de Montclos, Jean-Marie, 1988. Le guide du Patrimoine: Centre, pp. 175–179. Val de Loire, Ministère de la Culture: Hachette, Paris. ISBN 2-01-018538-2
