= Émile Laurens =

French politician (1884–1940)

Member of the French Chamber of Deputies
- In office 31 March 1935 – 16 June 1940
- Preceded by: Camille Chautemps
- Succeeded by: Constituency abolished
- Parliamentary group: RRRS
- Constituency: Loir-et-Cher

Mayor of Blois
- In office February 1940 – 16 June 1940
- Preceded by: Maurice Olivier
- Succeeded by: Maurice Olivier

Personal details
- Born: 29 January 1884 Réquista, Aveyron, French Third Republic
- Died: 16 June 1940 (aged 56) Blois, Loir-et-Cher, French Third Republic

Émile Laurens was a French politician born on 29 January 1884 in Réquista, Aveyron and died on 16 June 1940 in Blois, Loir-et-Cher. He was recognized as having died for France.

He replaced the former and future Prime Minister Camille Chautemps as the Radical deputy for Loir-et-Cher after a a 1935 by-election where he narrowly beat the militant agrarian leader Henry Dorgères in the second round of voting He served as Under-Secretary of State to the Prime Minister's Office from 18 January 1938 to 13 March 1938 in the Fourth Chautemps Government.

In February 1940, Maurice Olivier, then mayor of Blois, resigned for health reasons, and Émile Laurens was appointed as his replacement.

On 16 June 1940 He was fatally wounded during the Battle of France when the German army bombarded the Town Hall in the Foix district in Blois, where he resided with his family.

A street name in the center of Blois commemorates Laurens today, located west of Place de la Résistance.
