= List of possessions of the abbey of Marmoutier de Tours =

Abbey's possessions

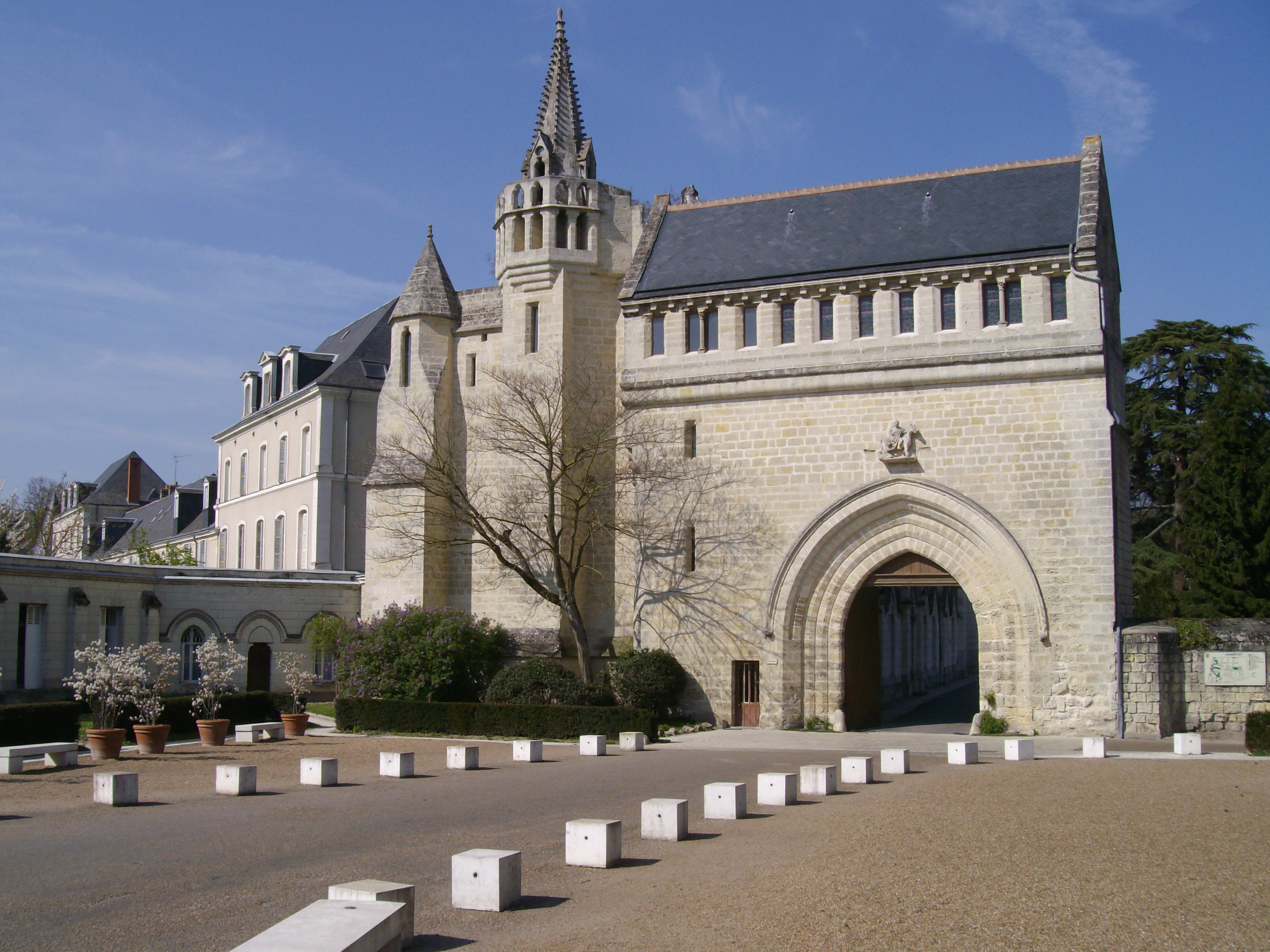
The Crosse portal (Marmoutier Abbey).

Until the French Revolution, the abbey of Marmoutier owned numerous estates in France, as well as in England. A list drawn up in the 17th century shows almost 200 dependencies, including five in England. The vast majority of these were priories, but the monks of Marmoutier also owned farms and mills close to their abbey, to ensure supplies.

== The abbey's possessions in France ==
=== Department of Aisne ===
- priory of Saint-Nicolas de Roucy
- priory of Saint-Thibaut.

=== Department of Aube ===
- Notre-Dame priory, Arcis-sur-Aube
- Saint-Pierre-et-Saint-Paul priory in Dampierre
- prieuré Sainte-Madeline d'Ortillon
- prieuré Notre-Dame in Ramerupt.

=== Department of Calvados ===
- priory of Saint-Vigor de Perrières.

=== Département of Cher ===
- prieuré Saint-Julien de Bourges
- priory of Saint-Martin-des-Champs de Bourges
- priory of Saint-Palais

=== Department of Côtes-d'Armor ===
- prieuré Saint-Malo de Dinan
- priory of Notre-Dame de Jugon-les-Lacs
- priory of Saint-Martin de Lamballe
- Abbey of Saint-Magloire de Léhon.

=== Department of Eure ===
- priory of Saint-Ouen de Gisors
- Grange-l'Abbé de Vesly seigneury.

=== Department of Eure-et-Loir ===
- priory of Saint-Martin-en-Val de Chartres
- priory of Saint-Martin-de-Chemars, Châteaudun
- priory of Chuisnes
- priory of Saint-Martin de Dangeau
- priory of Saint-Thomas d'Épernon
- priory of Saint-Nicolas de Fréteval
- priory of Notre-Dame de Maintenon
- priory of Meslay-le-Vidame
- priory of Saint-Maurice de Montigny-le-Gannelon
- priory of Saint-Nicolas du Puiset
- priory of Saint-Ange-et-Torçay
- priory of Saint-Hilaire-sur-Yerre.

=== Department of Finistère ===
- Île Tristan priory
- Saint-Martin-des-Champs priory.

=== Department of Gironde ===
- Sainte-Madeleine de Bazas priory
- priory of Saint-Denis de Saint-Denis-de-Pile.

=== Department of Ille-et-Vilaine ===
- Sainte-Madeleine-de-Bonnefontaine priory, Antrain
- Notre-Dame de Becherel priory
- Sainte-Trinité priory, Combourg
- Sainte-Trinité priory, Fougères
- prieuré Saint-Éxupère de Gahard
- Saint-Pierre priory, Iffendic
- prieuré Saint-Symphorien de Martigné-Ferchaud
- priory of Saint-Sauveur de Saint-Sauveur-des-Landes
- seigneury of Sens-de-Bretagne
- priory of Saint-Croix de Vitré.

=== Department of Indre-et-Loire ===
- Domaine de la Roche-Baudouin at Athée-sur-Cher
- Moulin du Lée, Cangey
- Champigny-sur-Veude priory
- Ferme de Couleur, Chanceaux-sur-Choisille
- Lavaré Priory in Fondettes
- Priory of Louroux
- Prieuré de Saint-Venant de Luynes
- Blondellerie farm in Monnaie
- Bourdigal seigneury in Monnaie
- Bourellerie farm in Monnaie
- métairie des Champs in Monnaie
- métairie de la Chèvrerie in Monnaie
- métairie de Corçay in Monnaie
- Saint-Jean de Monnaie chapel
- seigneury of Sentier in Monthodon
- domaine d'Oie-Blanche in Montlouis-sur-Loire
- priory of Négron in Nazelles-Négron
- fief of Neuville-sur-Brenne
- seigneury of Vauléart in Nouzilly
- Saint-Pierre church, Parçay-Meslay
- Chizay farm, Parçay-Meslay
- Meslay farm, Parçay-Meslay
- seigneury of Parçay, Parçay-Meslay
- Pécaudière farm, Parçay-Meslay
- prieuré Saint-Loup de Rillé
- Notre-Dame de Rivière priory
- closerie de Montauran in Rochecorbon
- Bezay farm, Saint-Cyr-sur-Loire
- du Fresne farm, Saint-Cyr-sur-Loire
- moulin de Garot, Saint-Cyr-sur-Loire
- Haye-Bodin farm, Saint-Cyr-sur-Loire
- moulin de Neuil, Saint-Cyr-sur-Loire
- fief de Berneçay, Saint-Quentin-sur-Indrois
- Domaine de Chahaigne, Semblançay
- Semblançay priory
- Hérissière farm in Sonzay
- priory of Sonzay
- priory of Tavant
- Saint-Barthélemy chapel and farm in Tours
- Chambrerie farm, Tours
- Maison de Foncher, Tours
- La Fontaine farm, Tours
- Grange-Saint-Martin fiefdom, Tours
- Lavanderie estate, Tours
- Milletière farm, Tours
- Sainte-Radegonde tithe, Tours
- Rambourg estate, Tours
- Domaine des Rochettes, Tours
- Saint-Pierre-de-Rome house, Tours
- Rougemont enclosure, Tours
- Sapaillé farm, Tours
- prieuré des Sept-Dormants in Tours
- fief du Lavoir, Veigné.

=== Department of Loir-et-Cher ===
- Mesnil farm in Averdon
- Saint-Julien priory in Chambon-sur-Cisse
- Fouleret mill in Chambon-sur-Cisse
- priory of Saint-Martin, Chouzy-sur-Cisse
- priory of Saint-Nicolas-de-Villeberfort de Conan
- priory of Saint-Martin de Lancé
- priory Saint-Genest de Lavardin
- priory of Saint Martin de Lavardin
- priory of Notre-Dame de Mesland
- priory of Notre-Dame de Morée
- priory of Saint-Barthélemy d'Orchaise
- seigneury of Pray
- priory of Sainte-Gemmes
- priory of Saint-Marc-du-Cor
- priory of Marchais de Troo
- Villerveau estate in Verdes.

=== Department of Loire-Atlantique ===
- prieuré Saint-Sauveur-de Béré de Châteaubriant
- prieuré Notre-Dame de Donges
- priory of Notre-Dame du Pellerin
- priory of Saint-Martin de Machecoul
- Sainte-Croix priory, Nantes
- priory of Saint-Georges de Nort-sur-Erdre
- Priory of Saint-Martin de Pontchâteau
- prieuré Saint-Martin de Varades.

=== Department of Loiret ===
- Notre-Dame-de-Bonne-Nouvelle priory, Orléans.

=== Department of Maine-et-Loire ===
- prieuré Saint-Éloi-du-Verger d'Angers
- prieuré Saint-Martin de Bocé
- priory of Saint-Martin de Carbay
- prieuré Saint-Quentin de Chalonnes-sur-Loire
- Saint-Jean-Baptiste priory, Champtoceaux
- Priory of Saint-Martin de Daumeray
- prieuré Notre-Dame de Liré
- Saint-Martin de Montjean-sur-Loire priory
- Sainte-Madeleine priory, Pouancé
- Mauny farm, Saint-Georges-sur-Loire
- Saint-Quentin priory in Saint-Quentin-en-Mauges.

=== Department of Manche ===
- priory of Saint-Georges-de-Bohon
- priory of Saint-Pierre d'Héauville
- priory of Saint-Martin de Mortain.

=== Department of Marne ===
- priory of Châtillon-sur-Marne
- priory of Saint-Maurice de Reims
- prieuré Saint-Rémi de Ventelay.

=== Department of Mayenne ===
- priory of Saint-Sulpice de Ballée
- prieuré Sainte-Julitte de Bouère
- prieuré de Fontaine-Géhard de Châtillon-sur-Colmont
- prieuré Saint-Martin de Laval
- Saint-Loup priory, Saint-Loup-du-Dorat
- priory of Villiers-Charlemagne.

=== Department of Morbihan ===
- Sainte-Julitte priory, Ambon
- prieuré Saint-Martin de Josselin
- priory of Malestroit
- Saint-Nicolas priory in Ploërmel.

=== Department of Oise ===
- Notre-Dame priory, Auneuil
- Neufontaine priory, Cuise-la-Motte
- prieuré Saint-Sulpice de Pierrefonds

=== Department of Orne ===
- Saint-Martin priory in Saint-Martin-du-Vieux-Bellême.

=== Department of Pas-de-Calais ===
- prieuré Saint-Martin de Beaurainville
- prieuré Notre-Dame de Maintenay
- prieuré Saint-Martin d'Œuf-en-Ternois
- prieuré Saint-Martin de Renty
- prieuré Notre-Dame de Sarton.

=== Department of Sarthe ===
- Orière farm and mill in Beaumont-sur-Sarthe
- Saint-Guingalois priory in Château-du-Loir
- prieuré Saint-Martin de Louvigny
- prieuré Saint-Nicolas de Sablé-sur-Sarthe
- priory of Saint-Célerin
- priory of Notre-Dame de Torcé-en-Vallée
- prieuré Saint-Hippolyte de Vivoin.

=== City of Paris ===
- prieuré Notre-Dame-des-Champs
- prieuré Saint-Germain de Villepreux.

=== Department of Seine-et-Marne ===
- Notre-Dame de Coutevroult priory
- prieuré de La Celle-sur-Morin
- prieuré Sainte-Céline de Meaux.

=== Department of Yvelines ===
- prieuré Saint-Georges de Bazainville
- prieuré Saint-Martin de Mantes-la-Jolie
- priory of Saint-Martin-de-Bréthencourt.

=== Department of Somme ===
- prieuré Saint-Denis d'Amiens
- Notre-Dame de Biencourt priory.

=== Department of Vendée ===
- prieuré Saint-Nicolas de Brem-sur-Mer
- Saint-Pierre-du-Puy-Belliard priory Chantonnay
- priory of Commequiers
- prieuré Saint-Jean-l'Évangéliste de Fontaines
- prieuré Saint-Etienne de La Roche-sur-Yon
- prieuré Saint-Saturnin de Sigournais
- prieuré Notre-Dame des Treize-Vents.

=== Department of Vienne ===
- prieuré de Saint-Benoît d'Aizenay
- prieuré Notre-Dame de Cernay.

=== Possessions not geographically located ===
Due to a lack of concordant sources or possible transcription errors in toponyms, the following possessions in France could not be precisely located.

- prieuré Saint-Martin de Chemais
- priory of Faxai in the diocese of Avranches
- prieuré Saint-Nicolas de Trioul, in the diocese of Poitiers
- Sainte-Madeleine du Vieilli priory, Rouen diocese
- prieuré Sainte-Colombe de Bailly, in the diocese of Troyes
- prieuré Notre-Dame de Croi, in the Évreux diocese
- prieuré Saint-Germain d'Acquenay, in the diocese of Le Mans
- priory of Mantillay, in the diocese of Le Mans
- priory of Saint-Étienne d'Origny, in the diocese of Le Mans
- priory of Donamez
- priory of Rossé, in the Vendôme region.

== The abbey's possessions in England ==
- priory of Allerton Mauleverer, county of North Yorkshire;
- priory of d'Aston de Newport Pagnell, county of Buckinghamshire;
- priory of Cosham, Portsmouth, county of Hampshire;
- priory of La Sainte-Trinité, York, county of Yorkshire;
- priory of Witham, county of Essex.

== Annexes ==
=== Archives ===
The archives départementales d'Indre-et-Loire (Indre-et-Loire departmental archives) hold a parchment-bound in-4° vellum register, comprising 46 sheets written on the acts of visits made by Jean de Mauléon to 90 priories dependent on his abbey from 1316 to 1325. Another register gives copies of the leases granted on the priories dependent on the abbey from 1719 to 1767.

== Bibliography ==
- Carré de Busserolle, Jacques-Xavier (1882). Dictionnaire géographique, historique et biographique d'Indre-et-Loire et de l'ancienne province de Touraine. ociété archéologique de Touraine.
- Gantier, Odile (1965). "Recherches sur les possessions et les prieurés de l'Abbaye de Marmoutier du xe au xiiie siècle : Troisième partie - rôle économique et social du prieuré". revue Mabillon (220).
- Loizeau de Grandmaison, Charles (1994). Archives ecclésiastiques antérieures à 1790 - Série H Clergé régulier.
- Mabille, Émile (1866). Notice sur les divisions territoriales et la topographie de l'ancienne province de Touraine (cinquième et dernier article). Bibliothèque de l'École des chartes. pp. 335–383. doi:10.3406/bec.1866.446064.

== See also ==
- Marmoutier Abbey, Tours
- Tours
- France
