= Chemillé-sur-Dême =

- Commune
- Location of Chemillé-sur-Dême
- Location within France Location within Centre-Val de Loire
- Coordinates: 47°39′34″N 0°38′57″E
- Country: France
- Region: Centre-Val de Loire
- Department: Indre-et-Loire
- Arrondissement: Chinon
- Canton: Château-Renault

Government
  - Mayor (2020–2026): Éloi Canon
- Area^{1}: 33.54 km^{2} (12.95 sq mi)
- Highest elevation: 164 m (538 ft)
- Lowest elevation: 75 m (246 ft)
- Population (2023): 707
  - Density: 21.1/km^{2} (54.6/sq mi)
- Time zone: UTC+01:00 (CET)
  - Summer (DST): UTC+02:00 (CEST)
- INSEE/Postal code: 37068 /37370
- ^{1} French Land Register data, which excludes lakes, ponds, glaciers > 1 km^{2} (0.386 sq mi or 247 acres) and river estuaries.

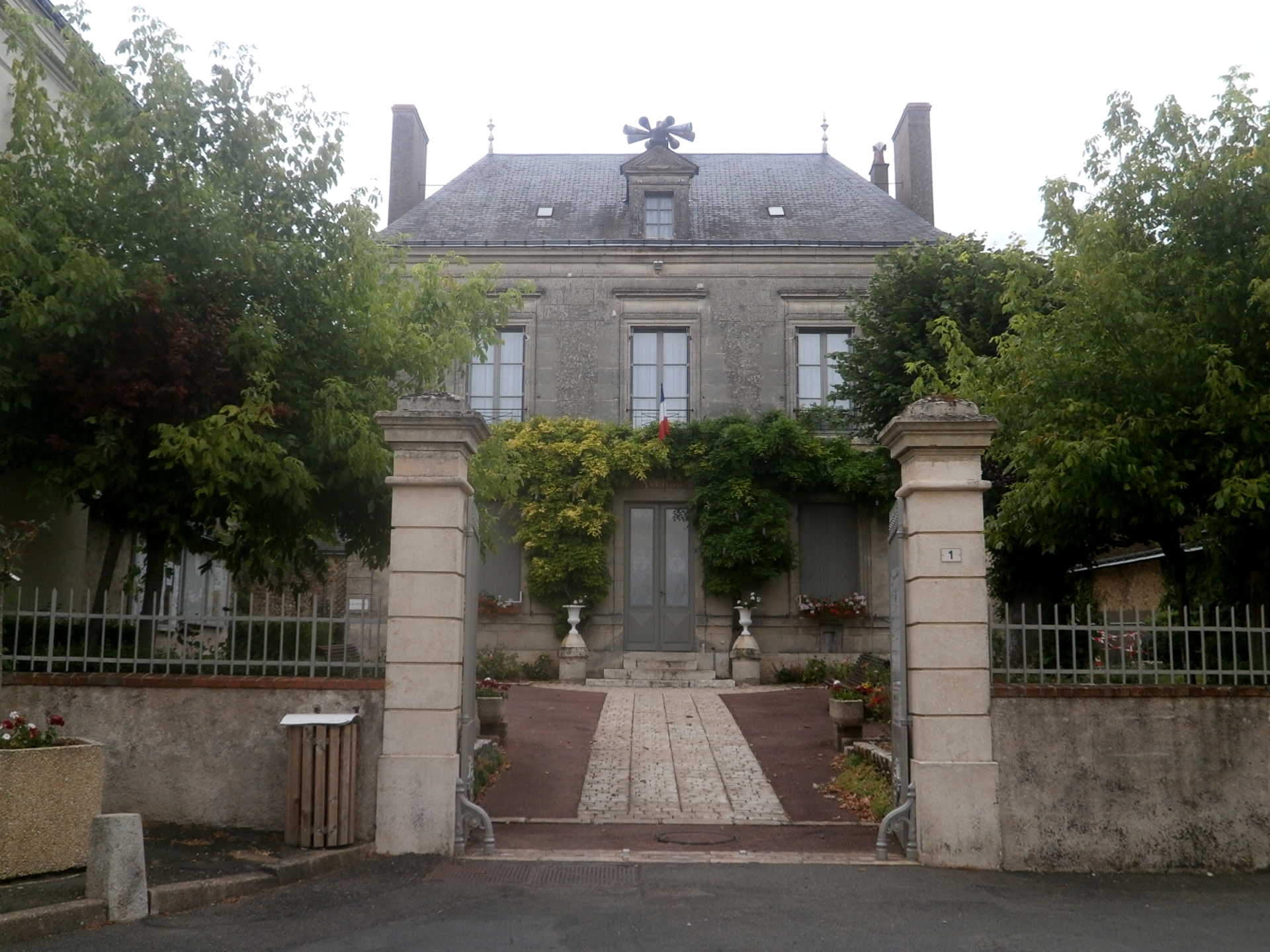
Chemillé-sur-Dême mairie

Chemillé-sur-Dême (French pronunciation: [ʃəmije syʁ dɛm]) is a commune in the Indre-et-Loire department in central France.

== Geography ==
The commune is situated in the Western area, near the borderline of the Sarthe region and Loir-et-Cher in the Indre-et-Loire department in central France. It is bordered by other communes such as, Épeigné-sur-Dême, Villedieu-le-Château, Montroveau, Les Hermites, Marray, Louestault and Neuvy-le-Roi.

The commune is situated approximately 35 – 40 minutes (31 km) from the North of the city, Tours, which is the largest city in the region of Centre-Val de Loire, and the prefecture of the department Indre-et-Loire.

The village includes two notable rivers, La Dême (total length of 32.5 km) as well as La Dêmée (total length of 13.8 km), as well as nine other small rivers including La Rorthe.

The commune is known to have clayey soils in most parts which result in minor cases of shrinkage / swellage, negatively impacting some buildings, and infrastructure.

== Population ==
Historical population
Year	Pop.	±% p.a.
1968	800	—
1975	677	−2.36%
1982	644	−0.71%
1990	585	−1.19%
1999	575	−0.19%
2007	659	+1.72%
2012	691	+0.95%
2017	719	+0.80%
2023	707	−0.28%
Source: INSEE

== Mayors ==
Time period	Identity	Political Stance
March 2001 - March 2008	Pierre Bonneau	Independent
March 2008 – Present	Éloi Canon	Independent

== Personalities linked to the commune ==
• Jean Raspail, French writer and explorer born in the commune in 1925, who died in Paris in 2020.

• Louis-Charles Couturier (1817 - 1890), was a Benedictine abbot, born in the village.

== See also ==
- Communes of the Indre-et-Loire department
