= Morand =

Morand may refer to:

- Morand, Indre-et-Loire, France
- Marand, Iran
