= Marray =

Marray may refer to:

- Marray, Indre-et-Loire, a commune in central France
- Jonathan Marray (born 1981), tennis player
- Santosh Marray, bishop of the Episcopal Diocese of Easton in Maryland, United States

== See also ==
- Murray (disambiguation)
