= Villedômer =

- Commune
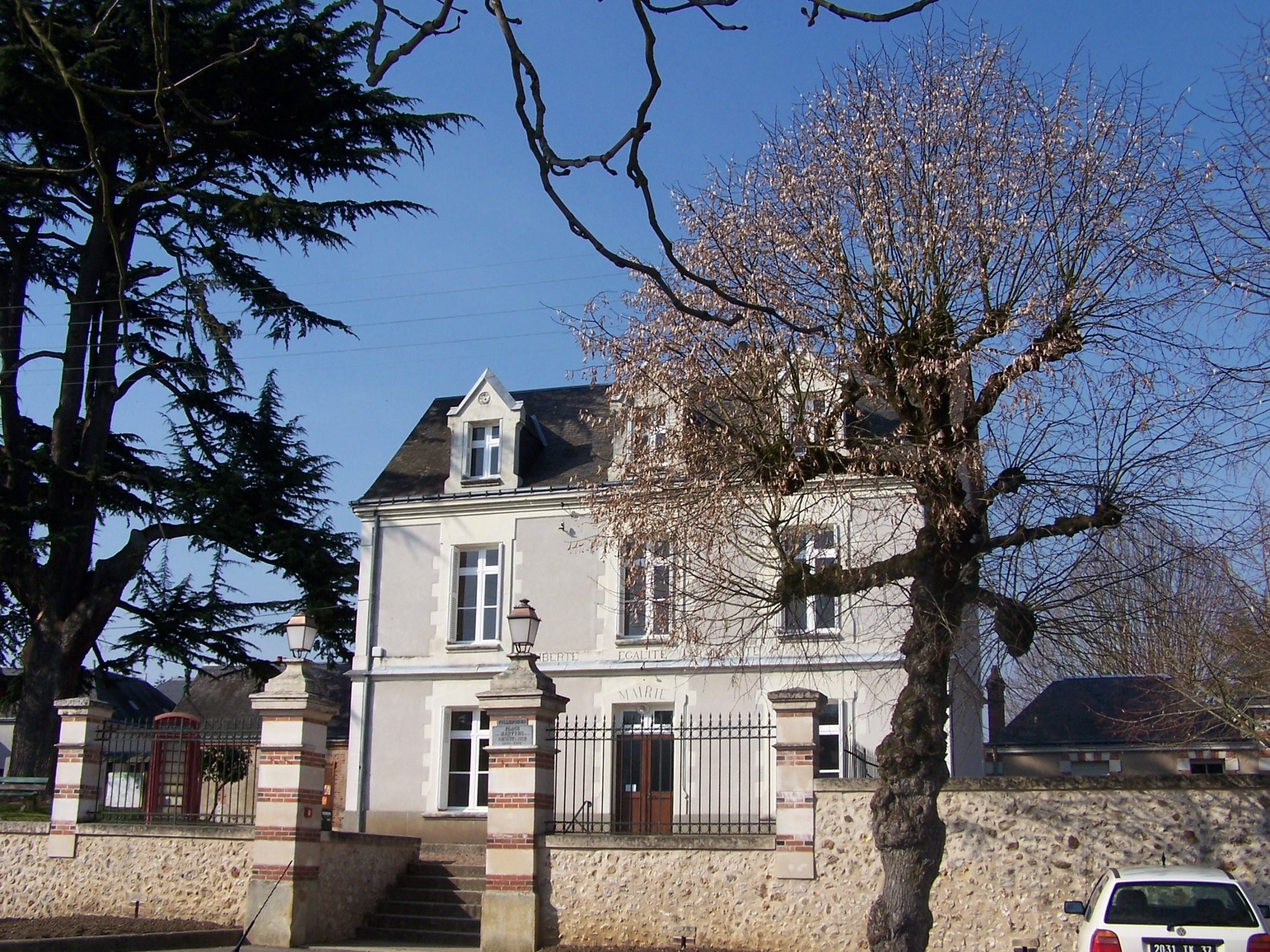
- Town hall
- Location of Villedômer
- Location within France Location within Centre-Val de Loire
- Coordinates: 47°32′48″N 0°53′21″E
- Country: France
- Region: Centre-Val de Loire
- Department: Indre-et-Loire
- Arrondissement: Loches
- Canton: Château-Renault

Government
  - Mayor (2020–2026): Chantal Gonzalez-Bourges
- Area^{1}: 35.49 km^{2} (13.70 sq mi)
- Highest elevation: 154 m (505 ft)
- Lowest elevation: 72 m (236 ft)
- Population (2023): 1,290
  - Density: 36.3/km^{2} (94.1/sq mi)
- Time zone: UTC+01:00 (CET)
  - Summer (DST): UTC+02:00 (CEST)
- INSEE/Postal code: 37276 /37110
- ^{1} French Land Register data, which excludes lakes, ponds, glaciers > 1 km^{2} (0.386 sq mi or 247 acres) and river estuaries.

Villedômer (French pronunciation: [vildome]) is a commune in the Indre-et-Loire department in central France.

== Population ==
Historical population
Year	Pop.	±% p.a.
1968	769	—
1975	992	+3.70%
1982	1,116	+1.70%
1990	1,095	−0.24%
1999	1,135	+0.40%
2007	1,278	+1.49%
2012	1,378	+1.52%
2017	1,359	−0.28%
2023	1,290	−0.86%
Source: INSEE

== See also ==
- Communes of the Indre-et-Loire department
