= Saint-Roch, Indre-et-Loire =

Saint-Roch
- Commune
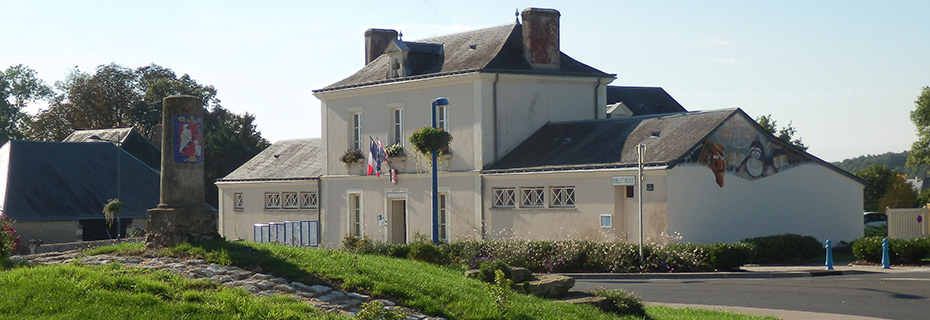
- The town hall in Saint-Roch

- Coat of arms
- Location of Saint-Roch
- Location within France Location within Centre-Val de Loire
- Coordinates: 47°26′46″N 0°34′48″E
- Country: France
- Region: Centre-Val de Loire
- Department: Indre-et-Loire
- Arrondissement: Chinon
- Canton: Château-Renault

Government
  - Mayor (2020–2026): Alain Anceau
- Area^{1}: 4.75 km^{2} (1.83 sq mi)
- Highest elevation: 113 m (371 ft)
- Lowest elevation: 78 m (256 ft)
- Population (2023): 1,342
  - Density: 283/km^{2} (732/sq mi)
- Time zone: UTC+01:00 (CET)
  - Summer (DST): UTC+02:00 (CEST)
- INSEE/Postal code: 37237 /37390
- ^{1} French Land Register data, which excludes lakes, ponds, glaciers > 1 km^{2} (0.386 sq mi or 247 acres) and river estuaries.

Saint-Roch (French pronunciation: [sɛ̃ ʁɔk]) is a commune in the Indre-et-Loire department in central France.

== Population ==
Historical population
Year	Pop.	±% p.a.
1968	223	—
1975	257	+2.05%
1982	535	+11.04%
1990	853	+6.00%
1999	871	+0.23%
2007	1,172	+3.78%
2012	1,226	+0.90%
2017	1,255	+0.47%
2023	1,342	+1.12%
Source: INSEE

== See also ==
- Communes of the Indre-et-Loire department
