= Charentilly =

- Commune
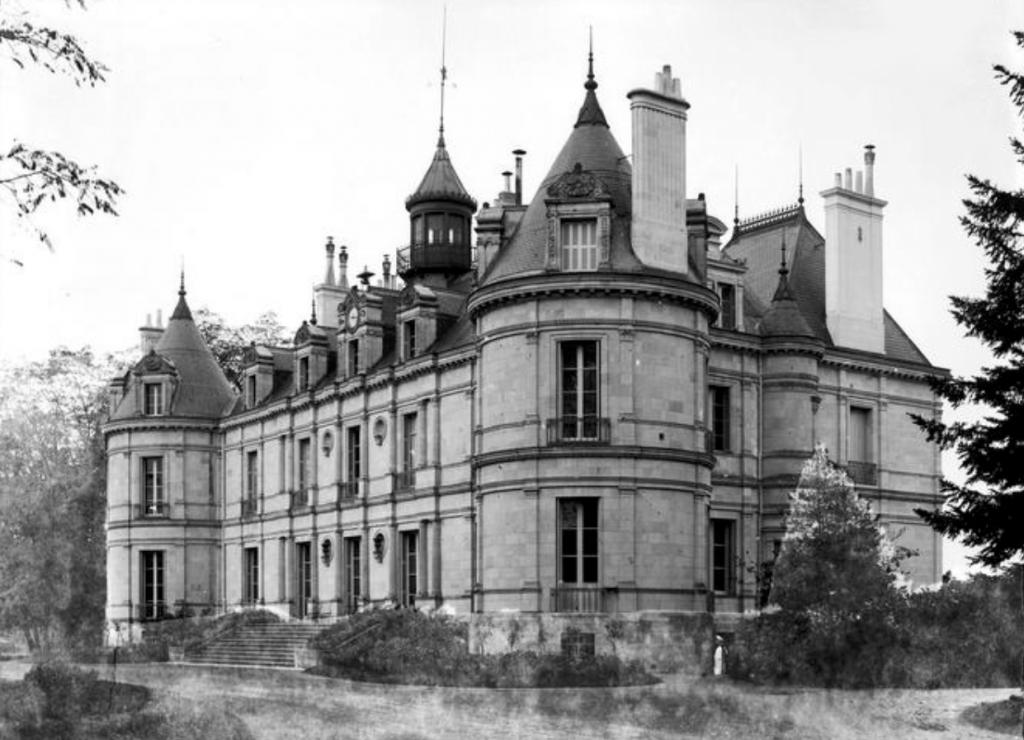
- The Château de Poillé, in Charentilly

- Coat of arms
- Location of Charentilly
- Location within France Location within Centre-Val de Loire
- Coordinates: 47°28′14″N 0°36′36″E
- Country: France
- Region: Centre-Val de Loire
- Department: Indre-et-Loire
- Arrondissement: Chinon
- Canton: Château-Renault

Government
  - Mayor (2020–2026): Valérie Bouin
- Area^{1}: 14.13 km^{2} (5.46 sq mi)
- Highest elevation: 122 m (400 ft)
- Lowest elevation: 73 m (240 ft)
- Population (2023): 1,365
  - Density: 96.60/km^{2} (250.2/sq mi)
- Time zone: UTC+01:00 (CET)
  - Summer (DST): UTC+02:00 (CEST)
- INSEE/Postal code: 37059 /37390
- ^{1} French Land Register data, which excludes lakes, ponds, glaciers > 1 km^{2} (0.386 sq mi or 247 acres) and river estuaries.

Charentilly (French pronunciation: [ʃaʁɑ̃tiji]) is a commune in the Indre-et-Loire department in central France.

== Population ==
Historical population
Year	Pop.	±% p.a.
1968	443	—
1975	509	+2.00%
1982	641	+3.35%
1990	855	+3.67%
1999	987	+1.61%
2007	1,050	+0.78%
2012	1,170	+2.19%
2017	1,257	+1.44%
2023	1,365	+1.38%
Source: INSEE

== Administration ==
list of successive mayors
Term		Name	Party	Occupation
18/05/2020	incumbent	Valérie Bouin		
28/03/2014	2020	Patrick Lehagre	DVD	Chef d'entreprise
21/03/2008	27/03/2014	Jacques Boullenger		
25/03/1989	21/03/2008	Dr Joël Pelicot	UDF	médecin, conseiller général du canton de Neuillé-Pont-Pierre (1979-2008)
25/01/1985	24/03/1989	Gérard Motard		
16/06/1974	24/01/1985	Maurice Pilorge		
17/04/1959	15/06/1974	Paul Rousseau		
27/10/1947	16/04/1959	Andrée Cousin (née Hervé)		
19/05/1945	26/10/1947	Jean Gannay		
20/05/1912	18/05/1945	baron Jean de Chanchevrier		
06/05/1907	19/05/1912	Rémy Fourmont		
26/06/1893	05/05/1907	baron Alfred Hainguerlot		
30/01/1890	25/06/1893	Mathurin Chandonnay		
06/07/1868	29/01/1890	Jules Hervé		
06/11/1865	05/07/1868	André Bodin		
24/08/1848	05/11/1865	Jean Vaslin (fils)		
05/09/1831	23/08/1848	Jean Vaslin (père)		
29/01/1830	04/09/1831	Charles Moisant		
03/09/1821	28/11/1830	Jean-Pierre Vaslin		
19/07/1815	02/09/1821	Jean-Baptiste Barrier		
05/06/1815	18/07/1815	Pierre Vaslin		
11/07/1808	04/06/1815	Jean-Baptiste Barrier		
23/01/1808	10/07/1808	Laurent Duval		
07/02/1804	22/11/1808	Pierre Vaslin		
05/02/1803	06/02/1804	François Collas		
18/03/1801	04/02/1803	Richard de La Missardière		
26/08/1787	17/03/1801	Pierre Vaslin		

== See also ==
- Communes of the Indre-et-Loire department
