= Auzouer-en-Touraine =

- Commune
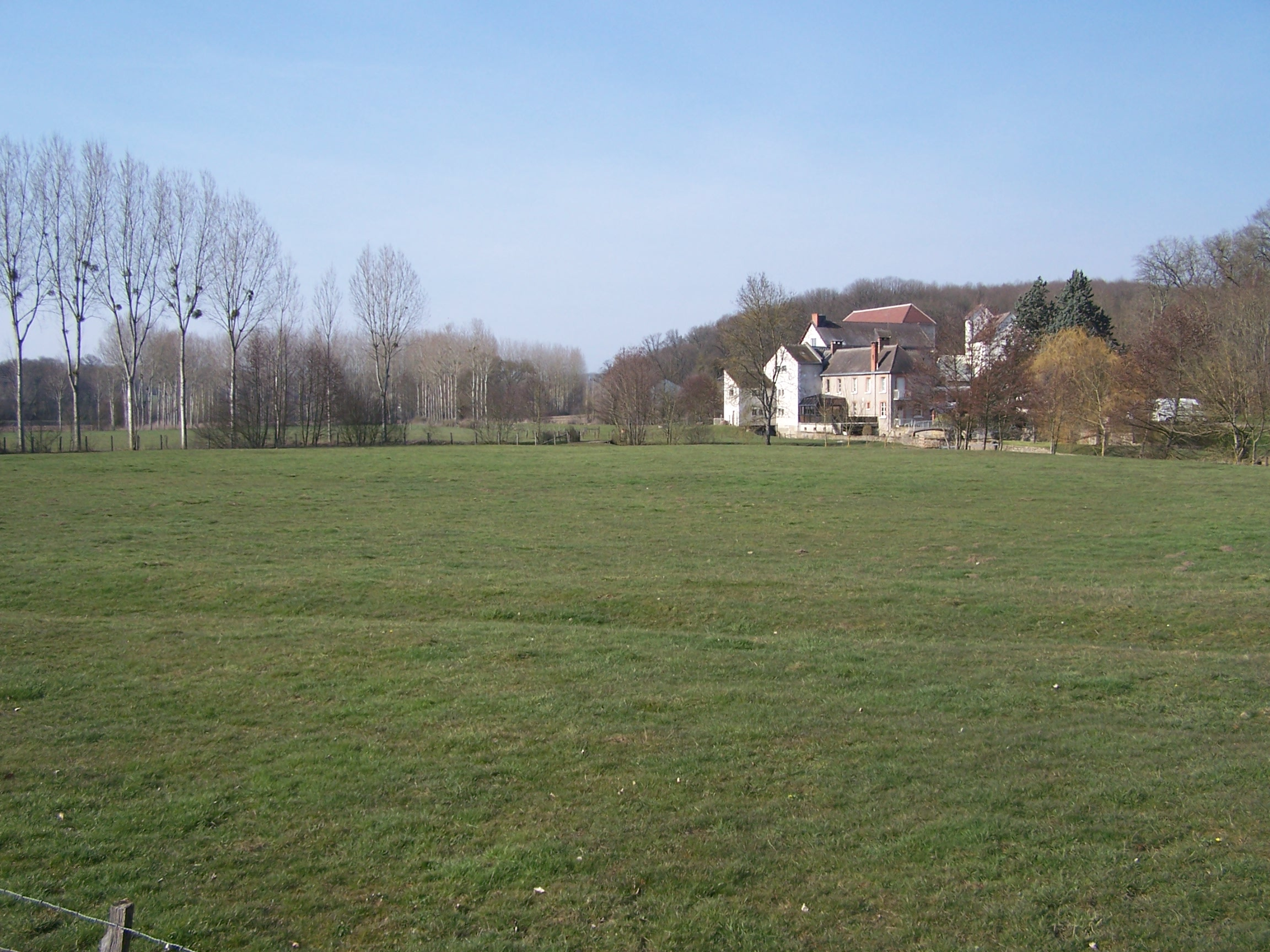
- A general view of Auzouer-en-Touraine

- Coat of arms
- Location of Auzouer-en-Touraine
- Location within France Location within Centre-Val de Loire
- Coordinates: 47°32′35″N 0°55′14″E
- Country: France
- Region: Centre-Val de Loire
- Department: Indre-et-Loire
- Arrondissement: Loches
- Canton: Château-Renault
- Intercommunality: CC Castelrenaudais

Government
  - Mayor (2020–2026): Jean-Claude Baglan
- Area^{1}: 34.05 km^{2} (13.15 sq mi)
- Highest elevation: 138 m (453 ft)
- Lowest elevation: 72 m (236 ft)
- Population (2023): 2,159
  - Density: 63.41/km^{2} (164.2/sq mi)
- Time zone: UTC+01:00 (CET)
  - Summer (DST): UTC+02:00 (CEST)
- INSEE/Postal code: 37010 /37110
- ^{1} French Land Register data, which excludes lakes, ponds, glaciers > 1 km^{2} (0.386 sq mi or 247 acres) and river estuaries.

Auzouer-en-Touraine (French pronunciation: [ozwɛʁ ɑ̃ tuʁɛn], literally Auzouer in Touraine) is a commune in the Indre-et-Loire department in central France.

== Population ==
Historical population

Year	Pop.	±% p.a.
1793	680	—
1800	521	−3.73%
1806	569	+1.48%
1821	633	+0.71%
1831	675	+0.64%
1836	653	−0.66%
1841	641	−0.37%
1846	686	+1.37%
1851	695	+0.26%
1856	705	+0.29%
1861	693	−0.34%
1866	706	+0.37%
1872	672	−0.82%
1876	666	−0.22%
1881	683	+0.51%
1886	701	+0.52%
1891	734	+0.92%
1896	692	−1.17%
1901	675	−0.50%

Year	Pop.	±% p.a.
1906	688	+0.38%
1911	673	−0.44%
1921	650	−0.35%
1926	689	+1.17%
1931	691	+0.06%
1936	652	−1.16%
1946	712	+0.88%
1954	691	−0.37%
1962	713	+0.39%
1968	646	−1.63%
1975	689	+0.92%
1982	983	+5.21%
1990	1,242	+2.97%
1999	1,309	+0.59%
2007	1,904	+4.80%
2012	2,118	+2.15%
2017	2,216	+0.91%
2023	2,159	−0.43%

Source: EHESS and INSEE (1968-2023)

== See also ==
- Communes of the Indre-et-Loire department
