= Canton of Château-Renault =

Canton of France

Coordinates: 47.59°N 0.91°E

The canton of Château-Renault is an administrative division of the Indre-et-Loire department, central France. Its borders were modified at the French canton reorganisation which came into effect in March 2015. Its seat is in Château-Renault.

It consists of the following communes:

1. Autrèche
2. Auzouer-en-Touraine
3. Beaumont-Louestault
4. Le Boulay
5. Bueil-en-Touraine
6. Cerelles
7. Charentilly
8. Château-Renault
9. Chemillé-sur-Dême
10. Crotelles
11. Dame-Marie-les-Bois
12. Épeigné-sur-Dême
13. La Ferrière
14. Les Hermites
15. Marray
16. Monthodon
17. Morand
18. Neuillé-Pont-Pierre
19. Neuville-sur-Brenne
20. Neuvy-le-Roi
21. Nouzilly
22. Pernay
23. Rouziers-de-Touraine
24. Saint-Antoine-du-Rocher
25. Saint-Aubin-le-Dépeint
26. Saint-Christophe-sur-le-Nais
27. Saint-Laurent-en-Gâtines
28. Saint-Nicolas-des-Motets
29. Saint-Paterne-Racan
30. Saint-Roch
31. Saunay
32. Semblançay
33. Sonzay
34. Villebourg
35. Villedômer
