= Doix-lès-Fontaines =

- Commune
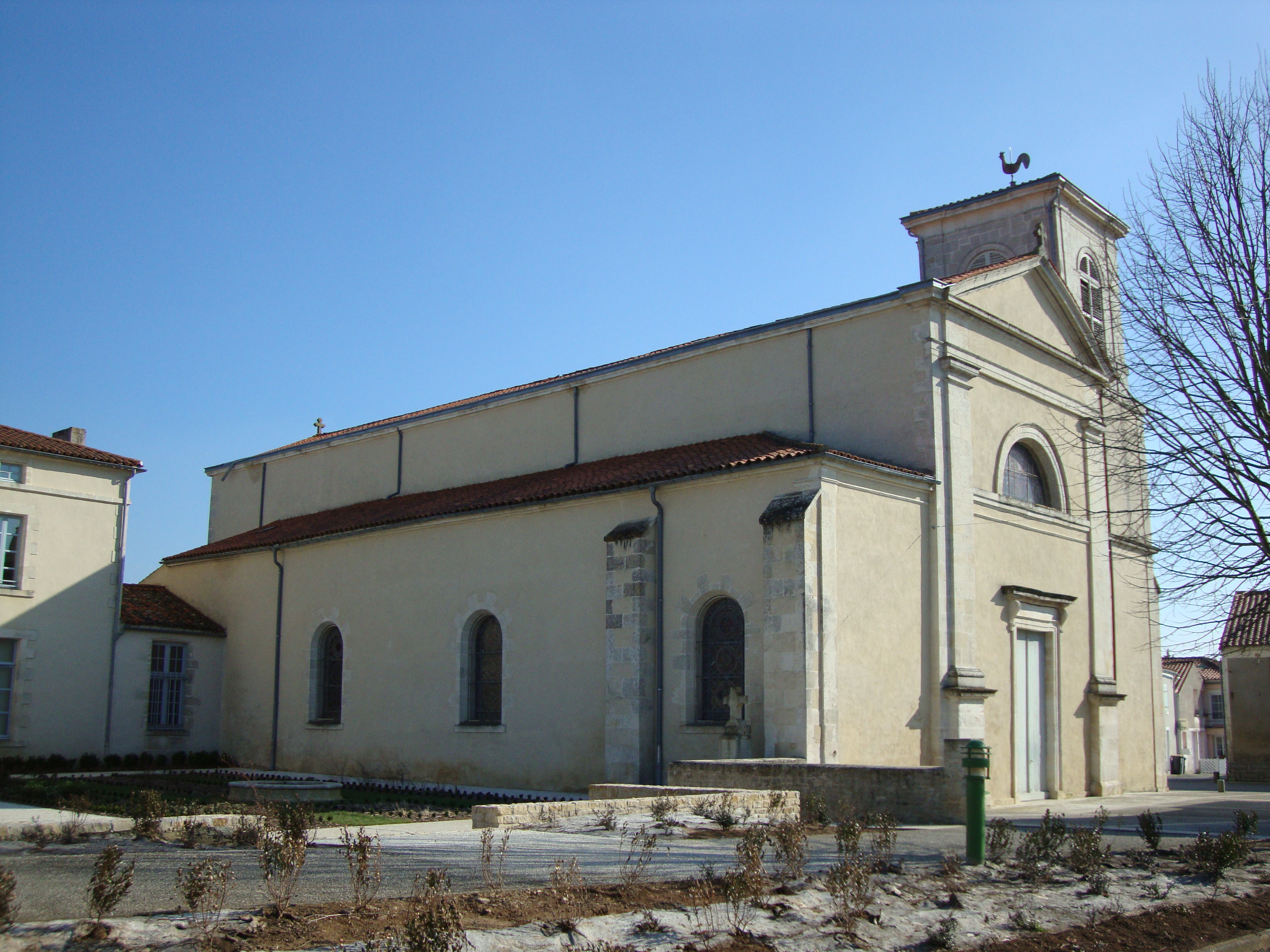
- Location of Doix-lès-Fontaines
- Location within France Location within Pays de la Loire
- Coordinates: 46°23′31″N 0°48′22″W
- Country: France
- Region: Pays de la Loire
- Department: Vendée
- Arrondissement: Fontenay-le-Comte
- Canton: Fontenay-le-Comte
- Area^{1}: 23.87 km^{2} (9.22 sq mi)
- Population (2023): 1,779
  - Density: 74.53/km^{2} (193.0/sq mi)
- Time zone: UTC+01:00 (CET)
  - Summer (DST): UTC+02:00 (CEST)
- INSEE/Postal code: 85080 /85200
- ^{1} French Land Register data, which excludes lakes, ponds, glaciers > 1 km^{2} (0.386 sq mi or 247 acres) and river estuaries.

Doix-lès-Fontaines is a commune in the department of Vendée, western France. The municipality was established on 1 January 2016 by merger of the former communes of Doix and Fontaines.

== See also ==
- Communes of the Vendée department
