= Doix =

Commune in Vendée, France

- Part of Doix-lès-Fontaines
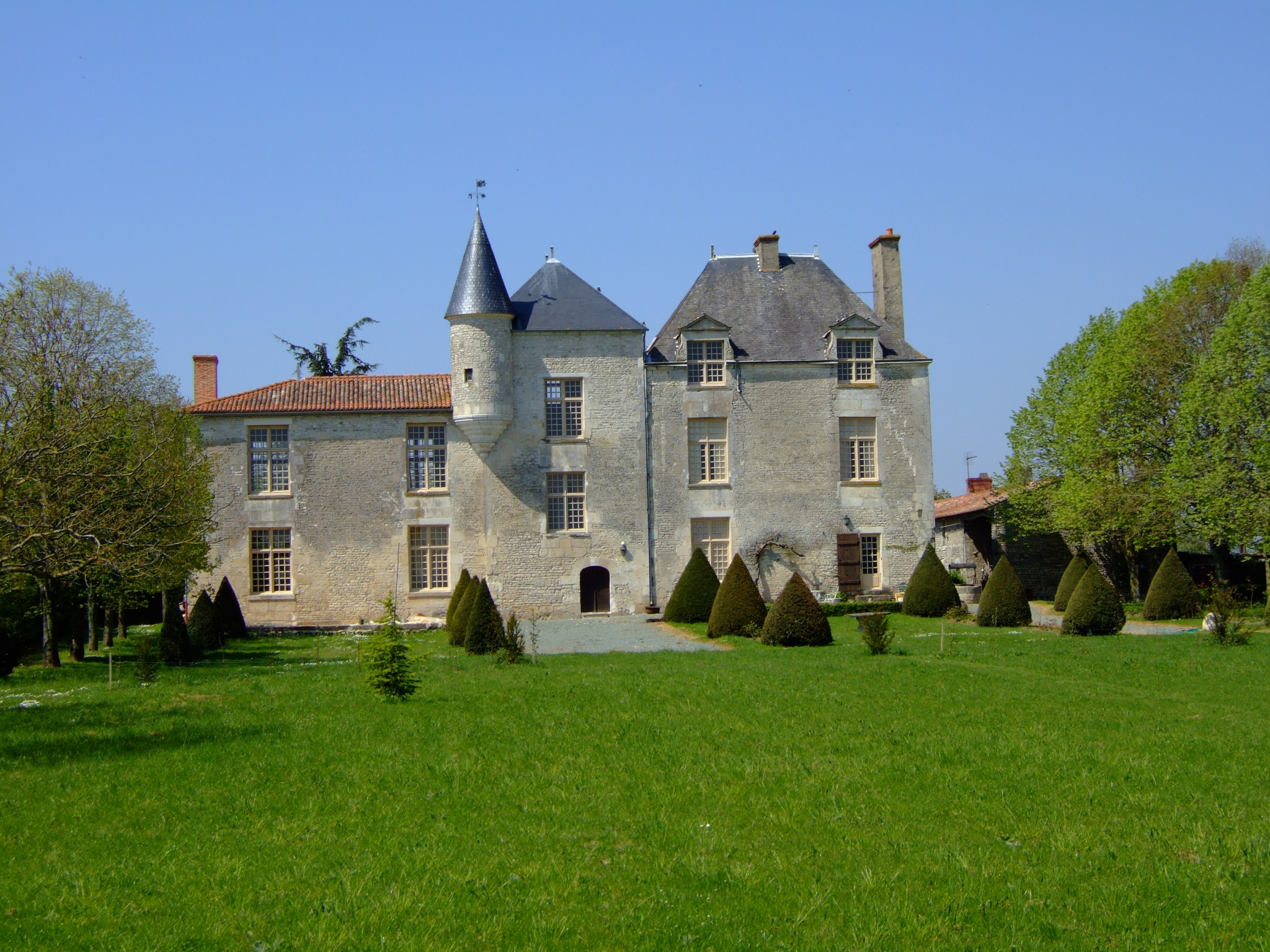
- The chateau in Doix
- Location of Doix
- Location within France Location within Pays de la Loire
- Coordinates: 46°23′35″N 0°48′18″W
- Country: France
- Region: Pays de la Loire
- Department: Vendée
- Arrondissement: Fontenay-le-Comte
- Canton: Fontenay-le-Comte
- Commune: Doix-lès-Fontaines
- Area^{1}: 13.31 km^{2} (5.14 sq mi)
- Highest elevation: 18 m (59 ft)
- Lowest elevation: 1 m (3.3 ft)
- Population (2022): 985
  - Density: 74.0/km^{2} (192/sq mi)
- Time zone: UTC+01:00 (CET)
  - Summer (DST): UTC+02:00 (CEST)
- Postal code: 85200
- ^{1} French Land Register data, which excludes lakes, ponds, glaciers > 1 km^{2} (0.386 sq mi or 247 acres) and river estuaries.

Doix is a former commune in the Vendée department in the Pays de la Loire region in western France. On 1 January 2016, it was merged into the new commune of Doix-lès-Fontaines.

== See also ==
- Communes of the Vendée department
