= Autrèche =

- Commune
- Coat of arms
- Location of Autrèche
- Location within France Location within Centre-Val de Loire
- Coordinates: 47°31′32″N 0°59′49″E
- Country: France
- Region: Centre-Val de Loire
- Department: Indre-et-Loire
- Arrondissement: Loches
- Canton: Château-Renault
- Intercommunality: CC Castelrenaudais

Government
  - Mayor (2020–2026): Jocelyne Defeings
- Area^{1}: 20.72 km^{2} (8.00 sq mi)
- Highest elevation: 122 m (400 ft)
- Lowest elevation: 82 m (269 ft)
- Population (2023): 419
  - Density: 20.2/km^{2} (52.4/sq mi)
- Time zone: UTC+01:00 (CET)
  - Summer (DST): UTC+02:00 (CEST)
- INSEE/Postal code: 37009 /37110
- ^{1} French Land Register data, which excludes lakes, ponds, glaciers > 1 km^{2} (0.386 sq mi or 247 acres) and river estuaries.

Autrèche (French pronunciation: [otʁɛʃ]) is a commune in the Indre-et-Loire department in central France.

== Population ==
Historical population
Year	Pop.	±% p.a.
1968	300	—
1975	258	−2.13%
1982	254	−0.22%
1990	328	+3.25%
1999	400	+2.23%
2007	378	−0.70%
2012	411	+1.69%
2017	427	+0.77%
2023	419	−0.31%
Source: INSEE

== See also ==
- Communes of the Indre-et-Loire department
