= Neuville-sur-Brenne =

- Commune
- Location of Neuville-sur-Brenne
- Location within France Location within Centre-Val de Loire
- Coordinates: 47°37′12″N 0°54′33″E
- Country: France
- Region: Centre-Val de Loire
- Department: Indre-et-Loire
- Arrondissement: Loches
- Canton: Château-Renault

Government
  - Mayor (2020–2026): Gino Gommé
- Area^{1}: 6.89 km^{2} (2.66 sq mi)
- Highest elevation: 146 m (479 ft)
- Lowest elevation: 87 m (285 ft)
- Population (2023): 872
  - Density: 127/km^{2} (328/sq mi)
- Time zone: UTC+01:00 (CET)
  - Summer (DST): UTC+02:00 (CEST)
- INSEE/Postal code: 37169 /37110
- ^{1} French Land Register data, which excludes lakes, ponds, glaciers > 1 km^{2} (0.386 sq mi or 247 acres) and river estuaries.

Neuville-sur-Brenne (French pronunciation: [nøvil syʁ bʁɛn], before 1987: Neuville), (literally "Neuville on Brenne"), is a commune in the Indre-et-Loire department in central France.

The commune lies on the Brenne River, a tributary of the Cisse, and is situated about 7 km Northwest of Château-Renault. It is a small rural community known for its agricultural landscape and its parish church of Saint-Martin.

== Population ==
Historical population
Year	Pop.	±% p.a.
1968	225	—
1975	250	+1.52%
1982	368	+5.68%
1990	516	+4.32%
1999	623	+2.12%
2007	694	+1.36%
2012	875	+4.74%
2017	899	+0.54%
2023	872	−0.51%
Source: INSEE

== See also ==
- Communes of the Indre-et-Loire department
