= Marmoutier Abbey, Tours =

Early monastery outside Tours, Indre-et-Loire, France

Coordinates: 47°24′11″N 0°43′2″E

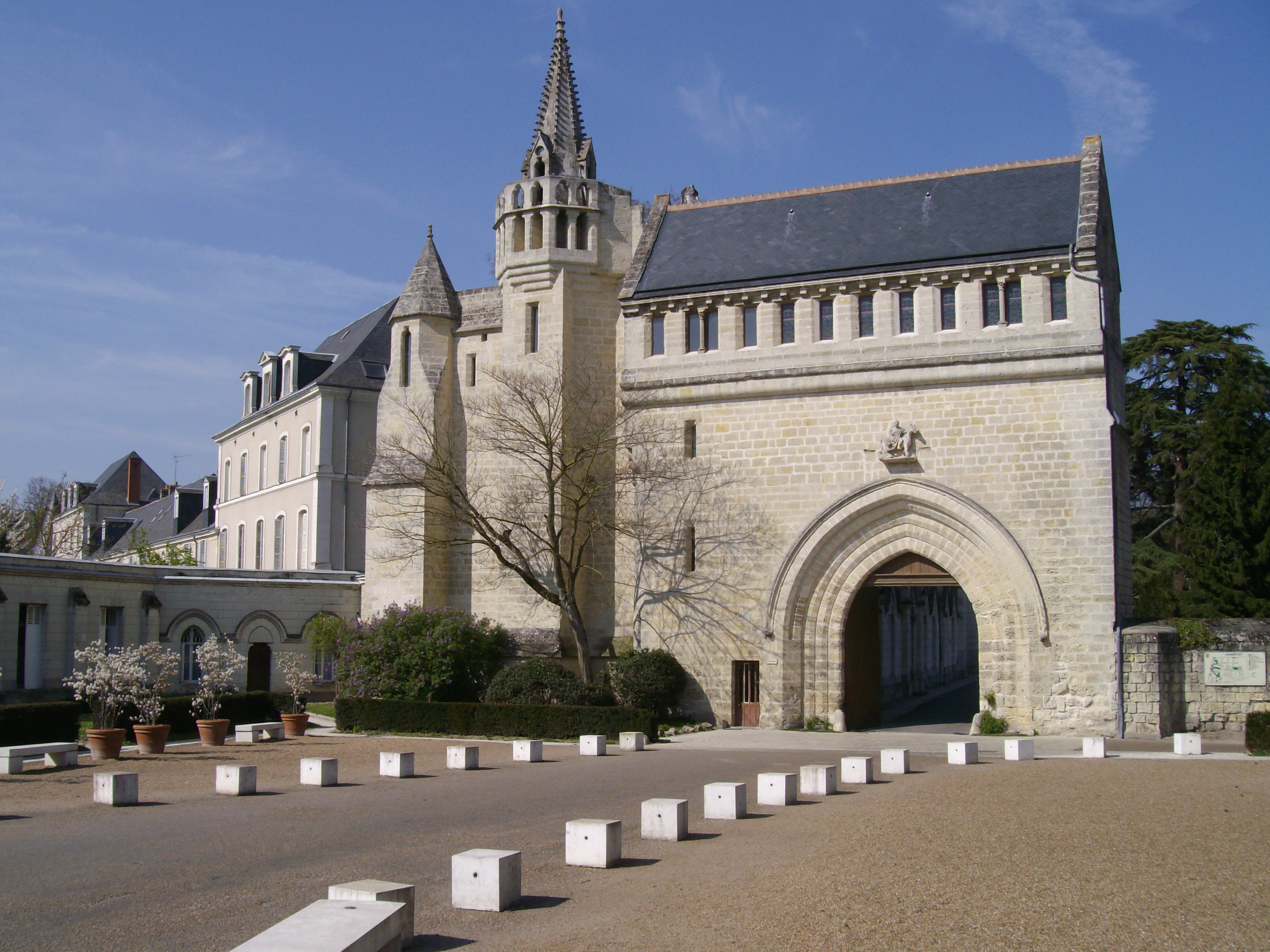
Marmoutier Abbey

Marmoutier Abbey, also known as the Abbey of Marmoutier or Marmoutiers, was an early monastery outside Tours, Indre-et-Loire, France. In its later days it followed the Benedictine order as an influential monastery with many dependencies.

== History ==
The abbey was founded by Saint Martin of Tours (316-397) in 372, after he had been made Bishop of Tours in 371. Martin's biographer, Sulpicius Severus (c. 363–c. 425), affirms that Martin withdrew from the press of attention in the city to live in Marmoutier (Majus Monasterium), the monastery he founded several miles from Tours on the opposite shore of the river Loire.

Sulpicius described the severe restrictions of the life of Martin among the cave-dwelling cenobites who gathered around him, a rare view of a monastic community that preceded the Benedictine rule:

Many also of the brethren had, in the same manner, fashioned retreats for themselves, but most of them had formed these out of the rock of the overhanging mountain, hollowed into caves. There were altogether eighty disciples, who were being disciplined after the example of the saintly master. No one there had anything which was called his own; all things were possessed in common. It was not allowed either to buy or to sell anything, as is the custom among most monks. No art was practiced there, except that of transcribers, and even this was assigned to the brethren of younger years, while the elders spent their time in prayer. Rarely did any one of them go beyond the cell, unless when they assembled at the place of prayer. They all took their food together, after the hour of fasting was past. No one used wine, except when illness compelled them to do so. Most of them were clothed in garments of camels' hair. Any dress approaching to softness was there deemed criminal, and this must be thought the more remarkable, because many among them were such as are deemed of noble rank.

According to the French chronicler St. Denis, the Muslims in 732 had decided to attack and destroy the monastery. In 853, the abbey was pillaged and destroyed by Normans, who killed over 100 monks. In 982 the abbey, which had fallen into some disorders, was restored by Majolus of Cluny, Abbot of Cluny, at the instance of Eudes I, Count of Blois and of Tours, who died a monk at Marmoutier. During the years shortly after 1000 AD, the abbey grew considerably, becoming one of the richest in Europe.

In the wake of the Norman Conquest of 1066, the abbey acquired patronage of churches in England. In 1096 Pope Urban II consecrated its new chapel, and preached the First Crusade. Pope Calixtus II preached crusade again in 1119, convincing Count Foulques V d'Anjou to take part and leading to his subsequent role as King of Jerusalem. In 1162 Pope Alexander III, who came to reside in Tours after being chased from Rome by Frederick Barbarossa, consecrated the monastery's new Chapel Saint Benoit.

The abbey eventually grew too small for its inhabitants, and was completely rebuilt at the start of the thirteenth century under the leadership of Abbot Hugues des Roches. Work was periodically interrupted by violent attacks made by the counts of Blois on the monks of Marmoutier. In 1253, Louis IX took the abbey under his protection. In the following century its abbot Gérard du Puy became cardinal-nephew to the last of the Avignon popes, Gregory XI. In 156,2 the abbey was again pillaged, this time by Huguenot Protestants at the start of the Wars of Religion. Again, however, it recovered. English diarist John Evelyn visited the abbey, and recorded this entry for 6 June 1644:

I went by water to visit that goodly and venerable Abbey of Marmoutiers, being one of the greatest in the kingdom: to it is a very ample church of stone, with a very high pyramid. Amongst other relics the Monks showed us is the Holy Ampoulle, the same with that which sacres their Kings at Rheims, this being the one that anointed Henry IV. Ascending many steps, we went into the Abbot's Palace, where we were showed a vast tun (as big as that at Heidelberg), which they report St. Martin (as I remember) filled from one cluster of grapes growing there.

The abbey was seized in 1799 during the French Revolution, and within a few decades the bulk of its buildings had been demolished.

American writer Henry James visited the abbey in 1883, being guided through the various buildings by "a chatty nun", as described in his book A Little Tour in France.

The former abbey grounds are now the location of a Catholic private school, the Institution Marmoutier.

== See also ==
List of possessions of the abbey of Marmoutier de Tours

== Sources ==
- Sulpitius Severus On the Life of St. Martin. Translation and Notes by Alexander Roberts. In A Select Library of Nicene and Post-Nicene Fathers of the Christian Church, New York, 1894, available online
- John Evelyn, Diary and Correspondence: Volume 1, ed. William Bray, London: George Bell and Sons, 1882. Chapter 5.
- Jensen, Kurt Villads (2018). "Saints at War in the Baltic Region". In Jensen, Carsten Selch; Sands, Tracey R.; Petersen, Nils Holger; Jensen, Kurt Villads (eds.). Saints and Sainthood around the Baltic Sea: Identity, Literacy, and Communication in the Middle Ages. Medieval Institute Publications.
- France Balade online article
- Peifer, Claude J. (2003). "Historical Reflections of the Life-Span of Monasteries". The American Benedictine Review. 54 (2): 121–141.
- Riley-Smith, Jonathan (1997). The First Crusaders, 1095-1131. University of Cambridge Press.
