= Saint-Aubin-le-Dépeint =

- Commune
- Location of Saint-Aubin-le-Dépeint
- Location within France Location within Centre-Val de Loire
- Coordinates: 47°38′11″N 0°23′29″E
- Country: France
- Region: Centre-Val de Loire
- Department: Indre-et-Loire
- Arrondissement: Chinon
- Canton: Château-Renault

Government
  - Mayor (2020–2026): Benoît Durand
- Area^{1}: 15.19 km^{2} (5.86 sq mi)
- Highest elevation: 133 m (436 ft)
- Lowest elevation: 60 m (200 ft)
- Population (2023): 340
  - Density: 22/km^{2} (58/sq mi)
- Time zone: UTC+01:00 (CET)
  - Summer (DST): UTC+02:00 (CEST)
- INSEE/Postal code: 37207 /37370
- ^{1} French Land Register data, which excludes lakes, ponds, glaciers > 1 km^{2} (0.386 sq mi or 247 acres) and river estuaries.

Saint-Aubin-le-Dépeint (French pronunciation: [sɛ̃.t‿obɛ̃ lə depɛ̃]) is a commune in the Indre-et-Loire department in central France.

== Population ==
Historical population
| Year | Pop. | ±% p.a. |
|---|---|---|
| 1968 | 428 | — |
| 1975 | 403 | −0.86% |
| 1982 | 376 | −0.99% |
| 1990 | 351 | −0.86% |
| 1999 | 329 | −0.72% |
| 2007 | 344 | +0.56% |
| 2012 | 316 | −1.68% |
| 2017 | 315 | −0.06% |
| 2023 | 340 | +1.28% |
Source: INSEE

== See also ==
- Communes of the Indre-et-Loire department
