= Saint-Nicolas-des-Motets =

- Commune
- Coat of arms
- Location of Saint-Nicolas-des-Motets
- Location within France Location within Centre-Val de Loire
- Coordinates: 47°35′11″N 1°02′17″E
- Country: France
- Region: Centre-Val de Loire
- Department: Indre-et-Loire
- Arrondissement: Loches
- Canton: Château-Renault
- Intercommunality: Castelrenaudais

Government
  - Mayor (2020–2026): Béatrice Verwaerde
- Area^{1}: 12.77 km^{2} (4.93 sq mi)
- Highest elevation: 15 m (49 ft)
- Lowest elevation: 10 m (33 ft)
- Population (2023): 238
  - Density: 18.6/km^{2} (48.3/sq mi)
- Time zone: UTC+01:00 (CET)
  - Summer (DST): UTC+02:00 (CEST)
- INSEE/Postal code: 37229 /37110
- ^{1} French Land Register data, which excludes lakes, ponds, glaciers > 1 km^{2} (0.386 sq mi or 247 acres) and river estuaries.

Saint-Nicolas-des-Motets (French pronunciation: [sɛ̃ nikɔla de mɔtɛ]) is a commune in the Indre-et-Loire department in central France.

== Population ==
Historical population
Year	Pop.	±% p.a.
1968	165	—
1975	158	−0.62%
1982	193	+2.90%
1990	189	−0.26%
1999	224	+1.91%
2007	253	+1.53%
2012	268	+1.16%
2017	261	−0.53%
2023	238	−1.53%
Source: INSEE

== See also ==
- Communes of the Indre-et-Loire department
