= Saunay =

- Commune
- Location of Saunay
- Location within France Location within Centre-Val de Loire
- Coordinates: 47°36′17″N 0°58′24″E
- Country: France
- Region: Centre-Val de Loire
- Department: Indre-et-Loire
- Arrondissement: Loches
- Canton: Château-Renault

Government
  - Mayor (2021–2026): Catherine Dattée
- Area^{1}: 25.98 km^{2} (10.03 sq mi)
- Highest elevation: 147 m (482 ft)
- Lowest elevation: 92 m (302 ft)
- Population (2023): 640
  - Density: 25/km^{2} (64/sq mi)
- Time zone: UTC+01:00 (CET)
  - Summer (DST): UTC+02:00 (CEST)
- INSEE/Postal code: 37240 /37110
- ^{1} French Land Register data, which excludes lakes, ponds, glaciers > 1 km^{2} (0.386 sq mi or 247 acres) and river estuaries.

Saunay (French pronunciation: [sonɛ]) is a commune in the Indre-et-Loire department in central France.

== Population ==
Historical population
Year	Pop.	±% p.a.
1968	428	—
1975	397	−1.07%
1982	388	−0.33%
1990	505	+3.35%
1999	507	+0.04%
2007	636	+2.87%
2012	661	+0.77%
2017	696	+1.04%
2023	640	−1.39%
Source: INSEE

== See also ==
- Communes of the Indre-et-Loire department
