= Neuillé-Pont-Pierre =

- Commune
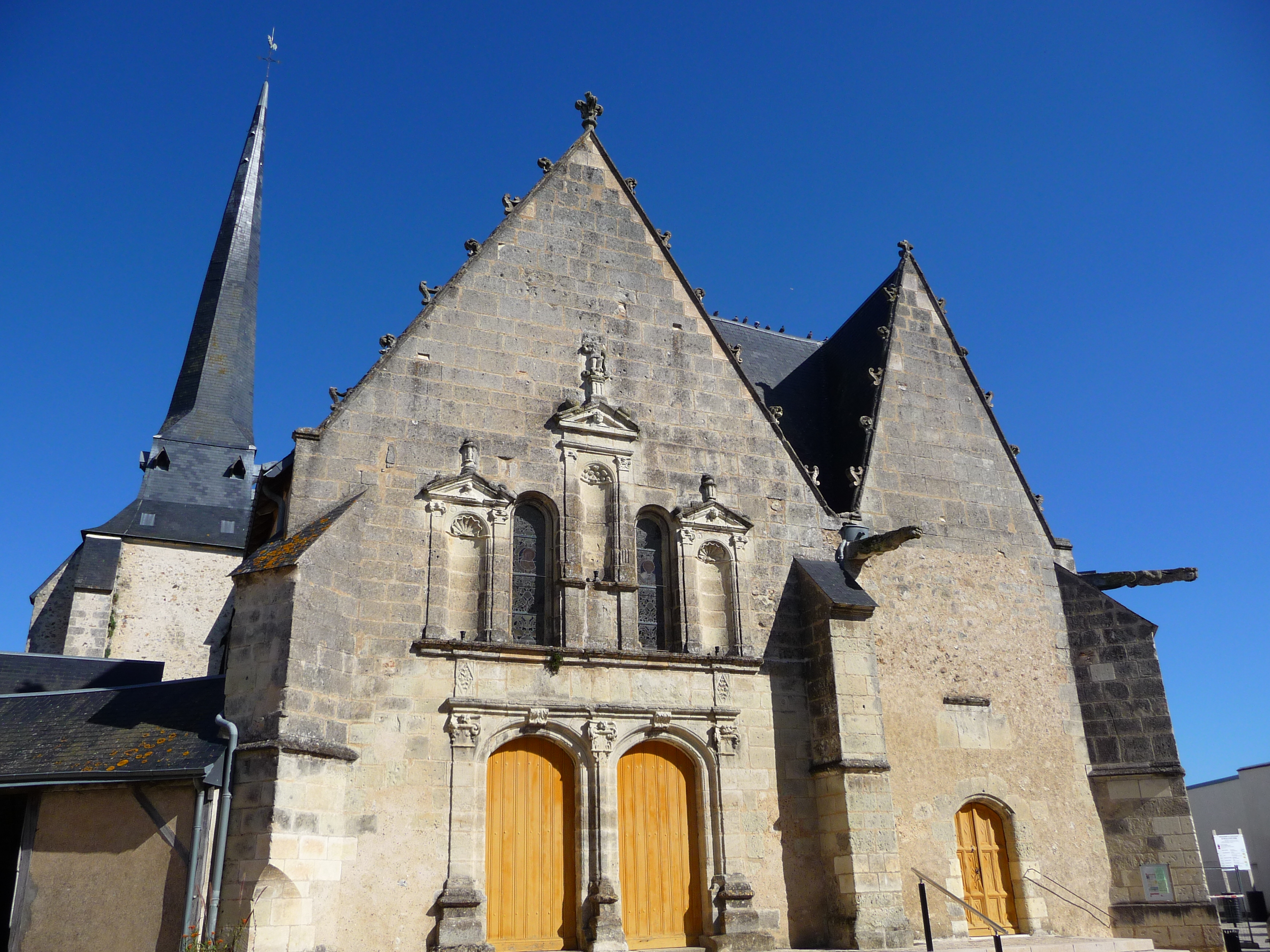
- The church of Saint-Pierre, in Neuillé-Pont-Pierre

- Coat of arms
- Location of Neuillé-Pont-Pierre
- Location within France Location within Centre-Val de Loire
- Coordinates: 47°32′53″N 0°32′56″E
- Country: France
- Region: Centre-Val de Loire
- Department: Indre-et-Loire
- Arrondissement: Chinon
- Canton: Château-Renault

Government
  - Mayor (2020–2026): Michel Jollivet
- Area^{1}: 39 km^{2} (15 sq mi)
- Highest elevation: 135 m (443 ft)
- Lowest elevation: 75 m (246 ft)
- Population (2023): 2,252
  - Density: 58/km^{2} (150/sq mi)
- Time zone: UTC+01:00 (CET)
  - Summer (DST): UTC+02:00 (CEST)
- INSEE/Postal code: 37167 /37360
- ^{1} French Land Register data, which excludes lakes, ponds, glaciers > 1 km^{2} (0.386 sq mi or 247 acres) and river estuaries.

Neuillé-Pont-Pierre (French pronunciation: [nœje pɔ̃ pjɛʁ]) is a commune in the Indre-et-Loire department of central France.

== Population ==
Historical population

Year	Pop.	±% p.a.
1793	1,532	—
1800	1,519	−0.12%
1806	1,732	+2.21%
1821	1,742	+0.04%
1831	1,701	−0.24%
1836	1,540	−1.97%
1841	1,570	+0.39%
1846	1,575	+0.06%
1851	1,601	+0.33%
1856	1,553	−0.61%
1861	1,538	−0.19%
1866	1,504	−0.45%
1872	1,419	−0.96%
1876	1,448	+0.51%
1881	1,438	−0.14%
1886	1,580	+1.90%
1891	1,541	−0.50%
1896	1,616	+0.95%
1901	1,617	+0.01%

Year	Pop.	±% p.a.
1906	1,612	−0.06%
1911	1,581	−0.39%
1921	1,501	−0.52%
1926	1,490	−0.15%
1931	1,472	−0.24%
1936	1,407	−0.90%
1946	1,434	+0.19%
1954	1,259	−1.61%
1962	1,288	+0.29%
1968	1,376	+1.11%
1975	1,365	−0.11%
1982	1,466	+1.02%
1990	1,560	+0.78%
1999	1,763	+1.37%
2007	1,957	+1.31%
2012	1,917	−0.41%
2017	2,004	+0.89%
2023	2,252	+1.96%

Source: EHESS and INSEE (1968-2023)

== See also ==
- Communes of the Indre-et-Loire department
