= Bueil-en-Touraine =

- Commune
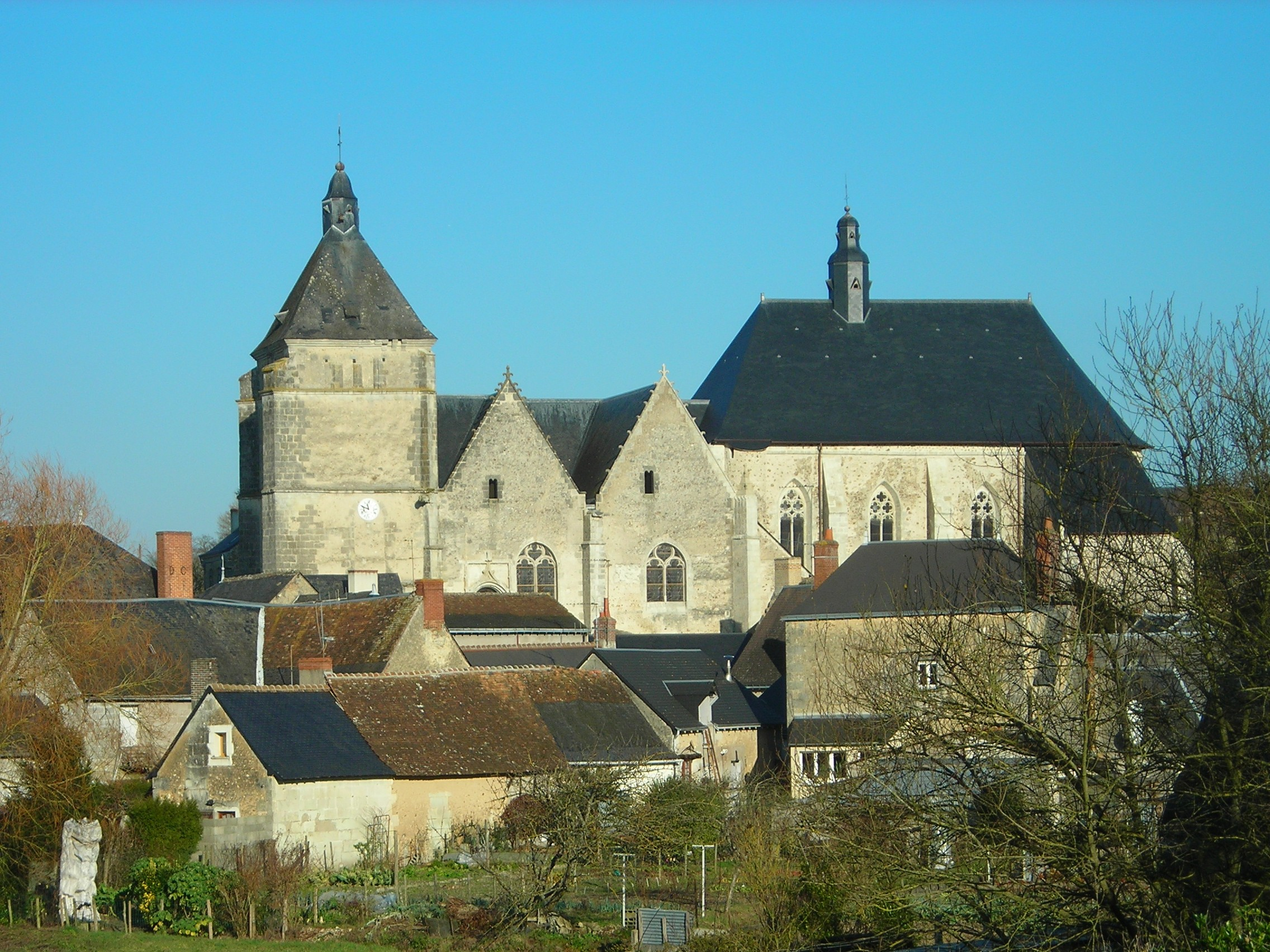
- The Church of Saint-Pierre and the collegiate church of Saint-Michel, in Bueil-en-Touraine

- Coat of arms
- Location of Bueil-en-Touraine
- Location within France Location within Centre-Val de Loire
- Coordinates: 47°38′44″N 0°33′03″E
- Country: France
- Region: Centre-Val de Loire
- Department: Indre-et-Loire
- Arrondissement: Chinon
- Canton: Château-Renault

Government
  - Mayor (2020–2026): Didier Descloux
- Area^{1}: 18.06 km^{2} (6.97 sq mi)
- Highest elevation: 127 m (417 ft)
- Lowest elevation: 63 m (207 ft)
- Population (2023): 323
  - Density: 17.9/km^{2} (46.3/sq mi)
- Time zone: UTC+01:00 (CET)
  - Summer (DST): UTC+02:00 (CEST)
- INSEE/Postal code: 37041 /37370
- ^{1} French Land Register data, which excludes lakes, ponds, glaciers > 1 km^{2} (0.386 sq mi or 247 acres) and river estuaries.

Bueil-en-Touraine (French pronunciation: [bɥɛj‿ɑ̃ tuʁɛn], literally Bueil in Touraine) is a commune in the Indre-et-Loire department in central France.

== Population ==
Historical population
Year	Pop.	±% p.a.
1968	519	—
1975	429	−2.68%
1982	452	+0.75%
1990	341	−3.46%
1999	366	+0.79%
2007	377	+0.37%
2012	324	−2.98%
2017	319	−0.31%
2023	323	+0.21%
Source: INSEE

== See also ==
- Communes of the Indre-et-Loire department
