= Dame-Marie-les-Bois =

- Commune
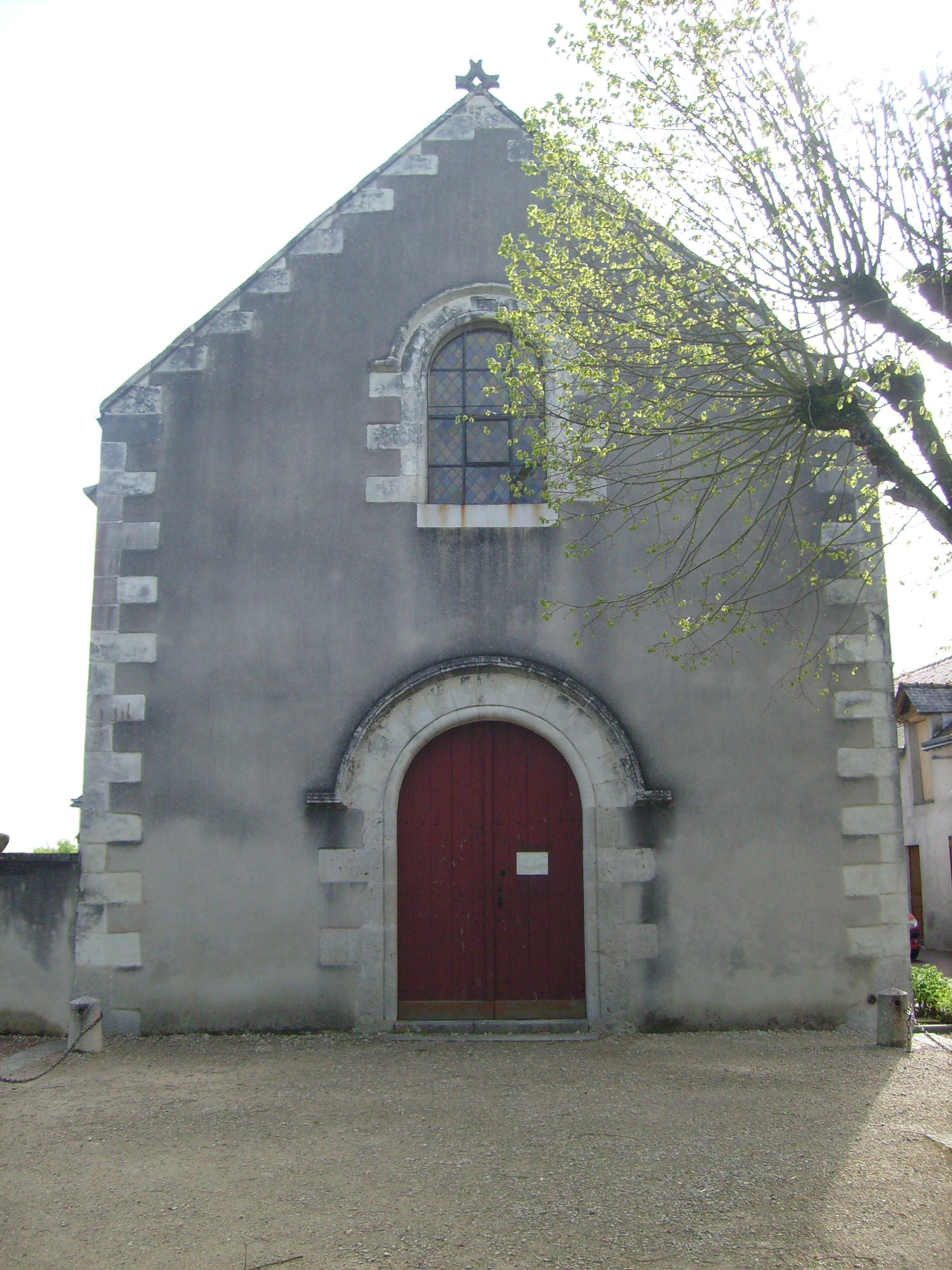
- The church in Dame-Marie-les-Bois
- Location of Dame-Marie-les-Bois
- Location within France Location within Centre-Val de Loire
- Coordinates: 47°32′28″N 1°01′59″E
- Country: France
- Region: Centre-Val de Loire
- Department: Indre-et-Loire
- Arrondissement: Loches
- Canton: Château-Renault

Government
  - Mayor (2020–2026): Jocelyne Petay
- Area^{1}: 8.91 km^{2} (3.44 sq mi)
- Highest elevation: 131 m (430 ft)
- Lowest elevation: 93 m (305 ft)
- Population (2023): 343
  - Density: 38.5/km^{2} (99.7/sq mi)
- Time zone: UTC+01:00 (CET)
  - Summer (DST): UTC+02:00 (CEST)
- INSEE/Postal code: 37095 /37110
- ^{1} French Land Register data, which excludes lakes, ponds, glaciers > 1 km^{2} (0.386 sq mi or 247 acres) and river estuaries.

Dame-Marie-les-Bois (French pronunciation: [dam maʁi le bwa]) is a commune in the Indre-et-Loire department in central France.

== Population ==
Historical population
Year	Pop.	±% p.a.
1968	274	—
1975	247	−1.47%
1982	225	−1.32%
1990	235	+0.55%
1999	275	+1.76%
2007	336	+2.54%
2012	322	−0.85%
2017	352	+1.80%
2023	343	−0.43%
Source: INSEE

== See also ==
- Communes of the Indre-et-Loire department
