= La Ferrière, Indre-et-Loire =

La Ferrière
- Commune
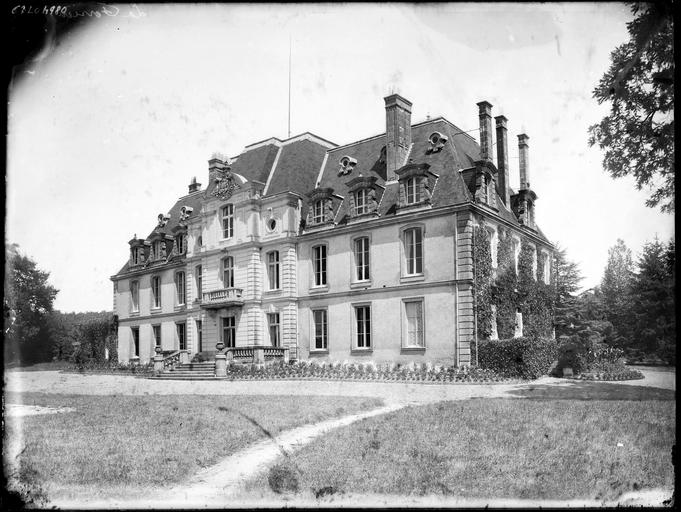
- The Château of La Ferrière
- Location of La Ferrière
- Location within France Location within Centre-Val de Loire
- Coordinates: 47°37′45″N 0°44′52″E
- Country: France
- Region: Centre-Val de Loire
- Department: Indre-et-Loire
- Arrondissement: Loches
- Canton: Château-Renault

Government
  - Mayor (2020–2026): Marc Leprince
- Area^{1}: 15.76 km^{2} (6.08 sq mi)
- Highest elevation: 170 m (560 ft)
- Lowest elevation: 118 m (387 ft)
- Population (2023): 306
  - Density: 19.4/km^{2} (50.3/sq mi)
- Time zone: UTC+01:00 (CET)
  - Summer (DST): UTC+02:00 (CEST)
- INSEE/Postal code: 37106 /37110
- ^{1} French Land Register data, which excludes lakes, ponds, glaciers > 1 km^{2} (0.386 sq mi or 247 acres) and river estuaries.

La Ferrière (French pronunciation: [la fɛʁjɛʁ]) is a commune in the Indre-et-Loire department in central France.

== Population ==
Historical population
Year	Pop.	±% p.a.
1968	222	—
1975	194	−1.91%
1982	206	+0.86%
1990	198	−0.49%
1999	214	+0.87%
2007	282	+3.51%
2012	296	+0.97%
2017	310	+0.93%
2023	306	−0.22%
Source: INSEE

== See also ==
- Communes of the Indre-et-Loire department
