= Saint-Laurent-en-Gâtines =

- Commune
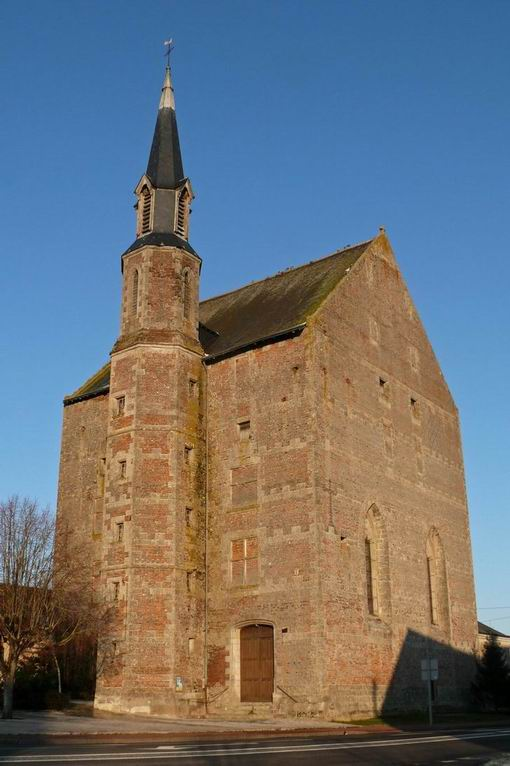
- The church of Saint-Laurent, in Saint-Laurent-en-Gâtines
- Location of Saint-Laurent-en-Gâtines
- Location within France Location within Centre-Val de Loire
- Coordinates: 47°35′17″N 0°46′41″E
- Country: France
- Region: Centre-Val de Loire
- Department: Indre-et-Loire
- Arrondissement: Loches
- Canton: Château-Renault
- Intercommunality: Castelrenaudais

Government
  - Mayor (2020–2026): Isabelle Senechal
- Area^{1}: 31.62 km^{2} (12.21 sq mi)
- Highest elevation: 171 m (561 ft)
- Lowest elevation: 110 m (360 ft)
- Population (2023): 873
  - Density: 27.6/km^{2} (71.5/sq mi)
- Time zone: UTC+01:00 (CET)
  - Summer (DST): UTC+02:00 (CEST)
- INSEE/Postal code: 37224 /37380
- ^{1} French Land Register data, which excludes lakes, ponds, glaciers > 1 km^{2} (0.386 sq mi or 247 acres) and river estuaries.

Saint-Laurent-en-Gâtines (French pronunciation: [sɛ̃ loʁɑ̃ ɑ̃ ɡatin]) is a commune in the Indre-et-Loire department in central France.

== Population ==
Historical population
Year	Pop.	±% p.a.
1968	533	—
1975	471	−1.75%
1982	546	+2.13%
1990	690	+2.97%
1999	728	+0.60%
2007	892	+2.57%
2012	949	+1.25%
2017	948	−0.02%
2023	873	−1.36%
Source: INSEE

== See also ==
- Communes of the Indre-et-Loire department
