= Crotelles =

- Commune
- Location of Crotelles
- Location within France Location within Centre-Val de Loire
- Coordinates: 47°32′37″N 0°50′14″E
- Country: France
- Region: Centre-Val de Loire
- Department: Indre-et-Loire
- Arrondissement: Loches
- Canton: Château-Renault

Government
  - Mayor (2020–2026): Véronique Berger
- Area^{1}: 15.89 km^{2} (6.14 sq mi)
- Highest elevation: 152 m (499 ft)
- Lowest elevation: 95 m (312 ft)
- Population (2023): 649
  - Density: 40.8/km^{2} (106/sq mi)
- Time zone: UTC+01:00 (CET)
  - Summer (DST): UTC+02:00 (CEST)
- INSEE/Postal code: 37092 /37380
- ^{1} French Land Register data, which excludes lakes, ponds, glaciers > 1 km^{2} (0.386 sq mi or 247 acres) and river estuaries.

Crotelles (French pronunciation: [kʁɔtɛl]) is a commune in the Indre-et-Loire department in central France.

== Population ==
Historical population
Year	Pop.	±% p.a.
1968	286	—
1975	380	+4.14%
1982	451	+2.48%
1990	460	+0.25%
1999	530	+1.59%
2007	619	+1.96%
2012	644	+0.80%
2017	691	+1.42%
2023	649	−1.04%
Source: INSEE

== See also ==
- Communes of the Indre-et-Loire department
