= Le Boulay =

- Commune
- Location of Le Boulay
- Location within France Location within Centre-Val de Loire
- Coordinates: 47°36′24″N 0°51′31″E
- Country: France
- Region: Centre-Val de Loire
- Department: Indre-et-Loire
- Arrondissement: Loches
- Canton: Château-Renault

Government
  - Mayor (2020–2026): Patrice Pottier
- Area^{1}: 20.1 km^{2} (7.8 sq mi)
- Highest elevation: 166 m (545 ft)
- Lowest elevation: 87 m (285 ft)
- Population (2023): 810
  - Density: 40/km^{2} (100/sq mi)
- Time zone: UTC+01:00 (CET)
  - Summer (DST): UTC+02:00 (CEST)
- INSEE/Postal code: 37030 /37110
- ^{1} French Land Register data, which excludes lakes, ponds, glaciers > 1 km^{2} (0.386 sq mi or 247 acres) and river estuaries.

Le Boulay (French pronunciation: [lə bulɛ]) is a commune in the Indre-et-Loire department in central France.

== Population ==
Historical population
| Year | Pop. | ±% p.a. |
|---|---|---|
| 1968 | 395 | — |
| 1975 | 398 | +0.11% |
| 1982 | 419 | +0.74% |
| 1990 | 440 | +0.61% |
| 1999 | 493 | +1.27% |
| 2007 | 598 | +2.44% |
| 2012 | 769 | +5.16% |
| 2017 | 793 | +0.62% |
| 2023 | 810 | +0.35% |
Source: INSEE

== See also ==
- Communes of the Indre-et-Loire department
