= Pernay =

- Commune
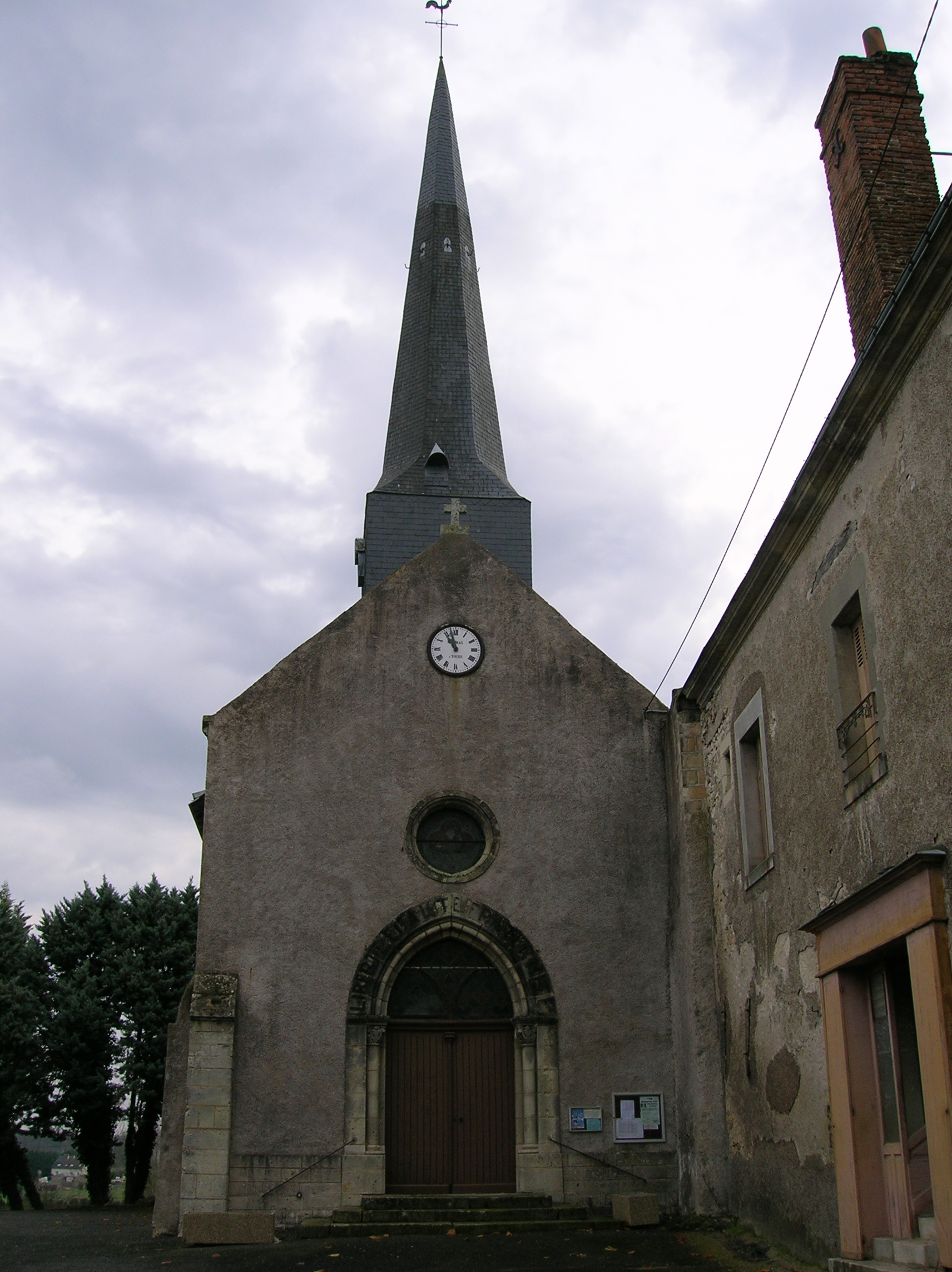
- The church in Pernay

- Coat of arms
- Location of Pernay
- Location within France Location within Centre-Val de Loire
- Coordinates: 47°26′40″N 0°30′01″E
- Country: France
- Region: Centre-Val de Loire
- Department: Indre-et-Loire
- Arrondissement: Chinon
- Canton: Château-Renault

Government
  - Mayor (2020–2026): Jean-Pierre Peninon
- Area^{1}: 17.61 km^{2} (6.80 sq mi)
- Highest elevation: 119 m (390 ft)
- Lowest elevation: 60 m (200 ft)
- Population (2023): 1,609
  - Density: 91.37/km^{2} (236.6/sq mi)
- Time zone: UTC+01:00 (CET)
  - Summer (DST): UTC+02:00 (CEST)
- INSEE/Postal code: 37182 /37230
- ^{1} French Land Register data, which excludes lakes, ponds, glaciers > 1 km^{2} (0.386 sq mi or 247 acres) and river estuaries.

Pernay (French pronunciation: [pɛʁnɛ]) is a commune in the Indre-et-Loire department in central France.

== Population ==
Historical population
Year	Pop.	±% p.a.
1968	518	—
1975	511	−0.19%
1982	565	+1.45%
1990	677	+2.29%
1999	866	+2.77%
2007	1,016	+2.02%
2012	1,132	+2.19%
2017	1,349	+3.57%
2023	1,609	+2.98%
Source: INSEE

== See also ==
- Communes of the Indre-et-Loire department
