= Rouziers-de-Touraine =

- Commune
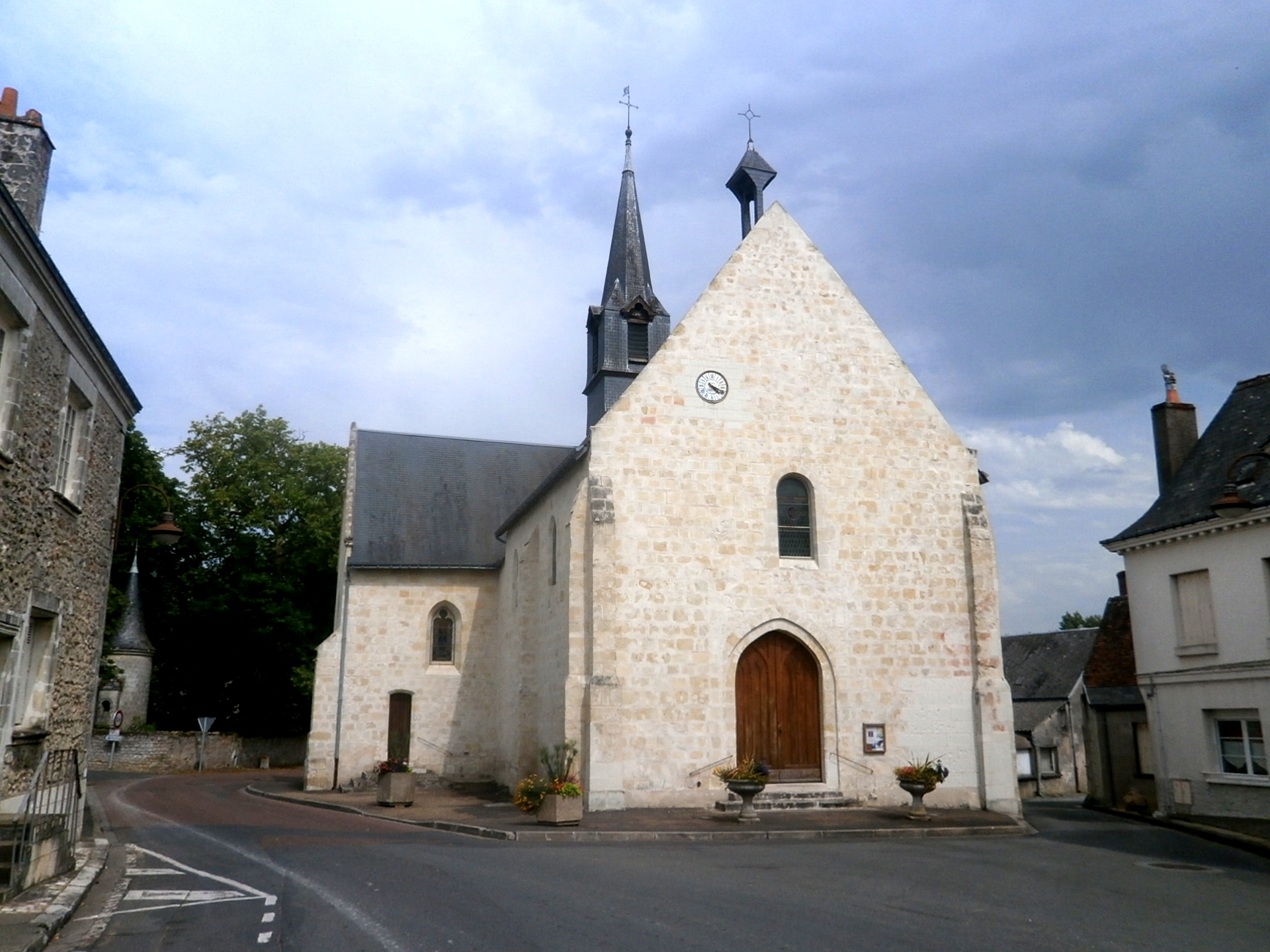
- Rouziers-de-Touraine Town hall

- Coat of arms
- Location of Rouziers-de-Touraine
- Location within France Location within Centre-Val de Loire
- Coordinates: 47°31′06″N 0°38′59″E
- Country: France
- Region: Centre-Val de Loire
- Department: Indre-et-Loire
- Arrondissement: Chinon
- Canton: Château-Renault

Government
  - Mayor (2020–2026): James Deligny
- Area^{1}: 18.19 km^{2} (7.02 sq mi)
- Highest elevation: 132 m (433 ft)
- Lowest elevation: 78 m (256 ft)
- Population (2023): 1,362
  - Density: 74.88/km^{2} (193.9/sq mi)
- Time zone: UTC+01:00 (CET)
  - Summer (DST): UTC+02:00 (CEST)
- INSEE/Postal code: 37204 /37360
- ^{1} French Land Register data, which excludes lakes, ponds, glaciers > 1 km^{2} (0.386 sq mi or 247 acres) and river estuaries.

Rouziers-de-Touraine (French pronunciation: [ʁuzje də tuʁɛn], literally Rouziers of Touraine) is a commune in the Indre-et-Loire department in central France.

== Population ==
Historical population
Year	Pop.	±% p.a.
1968	503	—
1975	541	+1.05%
1982	630	+2.20%
1990	756	+2.31%
1999	1,038	+3.59%
2007	1,216	+2.00%
2012	1,216	+0.00%
2017	1,317	+1.61%
2023	1,362	+0.56%
Source: INSEE

== See also ==
- Communes of the Indre-et-Loire department
