= Cerelles =

- Commune
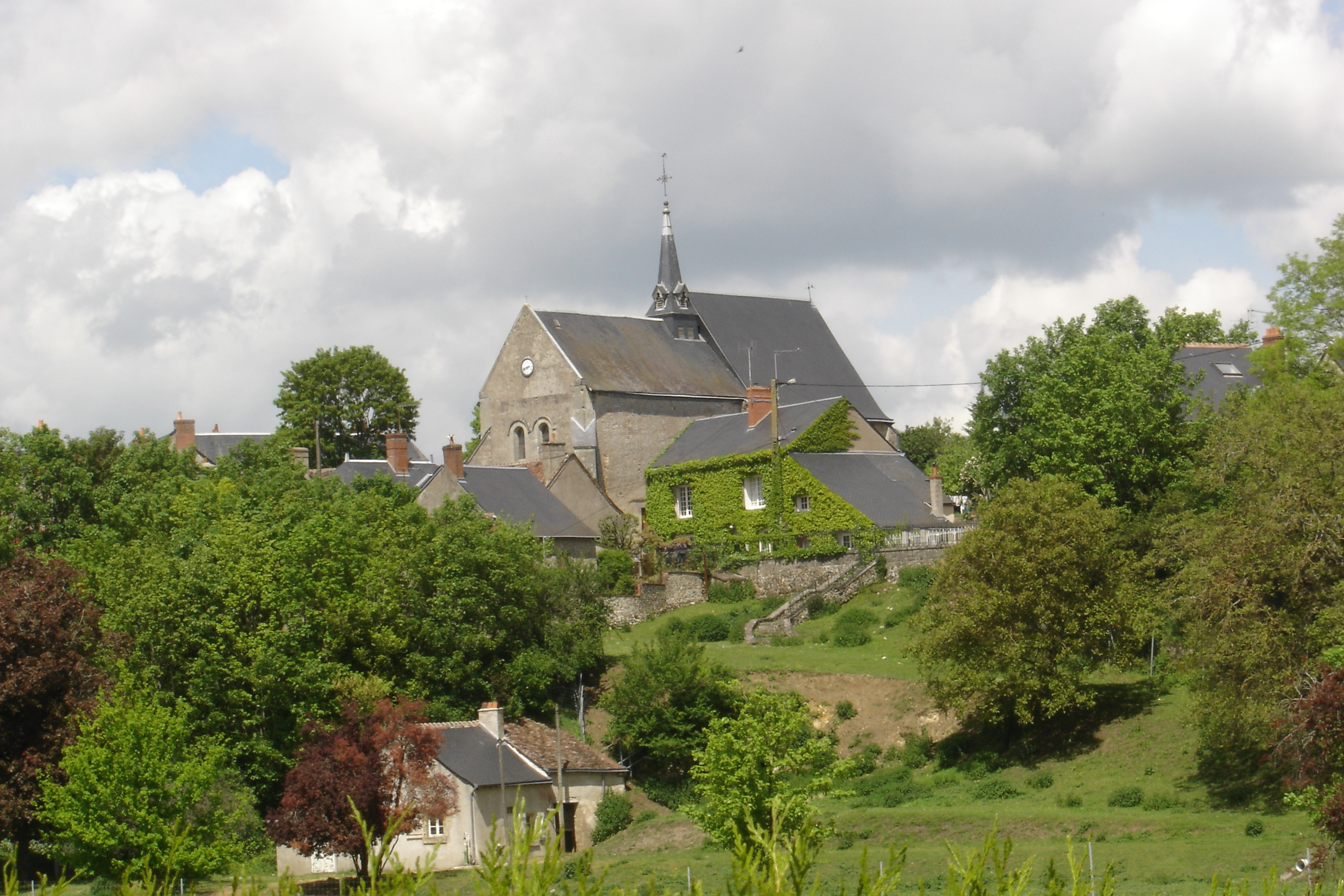
- The church of Saint-Pierre overlooking the Bedouere Valley
- Location of Cerelles
- Location within France Location within Centre-Val de Loire
- Coordinates: 47°30′01″N 0°40′59″E
- Country: France
- Region: Centre-Val de Loire
- Department: Indre-et-Loire
- Arrondissement: Chinon
- Canton: Château-Renault

Government
  - Mayor (2020–2026): Guy Poulle
- Area^{1}: 12.3 km^{2} (4.7 sq mi)
- Highest elevation: 122 m (400 ft)
- Lowest elevation: 62 m (203 ft)
- Population (2023): 1,252
  - Density: 102/km^{2} (264/sq mi)
- Time zone: UTC+01:00 (CET)
  - Summer (DST): UTC+02:00 (CEST)
- INSEE/Postal code: 37047 /37390
- ^{1} French Land Register data, which excludes lakes, ponds, glaciers > 1 km^{2} (0.386 sq mi or 247 acres) and river estuaries.

Cerelles (French pronunciation: [səʁɛl]) is a commune in the Indre-et-Loire department in central France.

== Population ==
Historical population
Year	Pop.	±% p.a.
1968	401	—
1975	437	+1.24%
1982	575	+4.00%
1990	793	+4.10%
1999	982	+2.40%
2007	1,217	+2.72%
2012	1,222	+0.08%
2017	1,198	−0.40%
2023	1,252	+0.74%
Source: INSEE

== See also ==
- Communes of the Indre-et-Loire department
