= Fontaines, Vendée =

Fontaines
- Part of Doix-lès-Fontaines
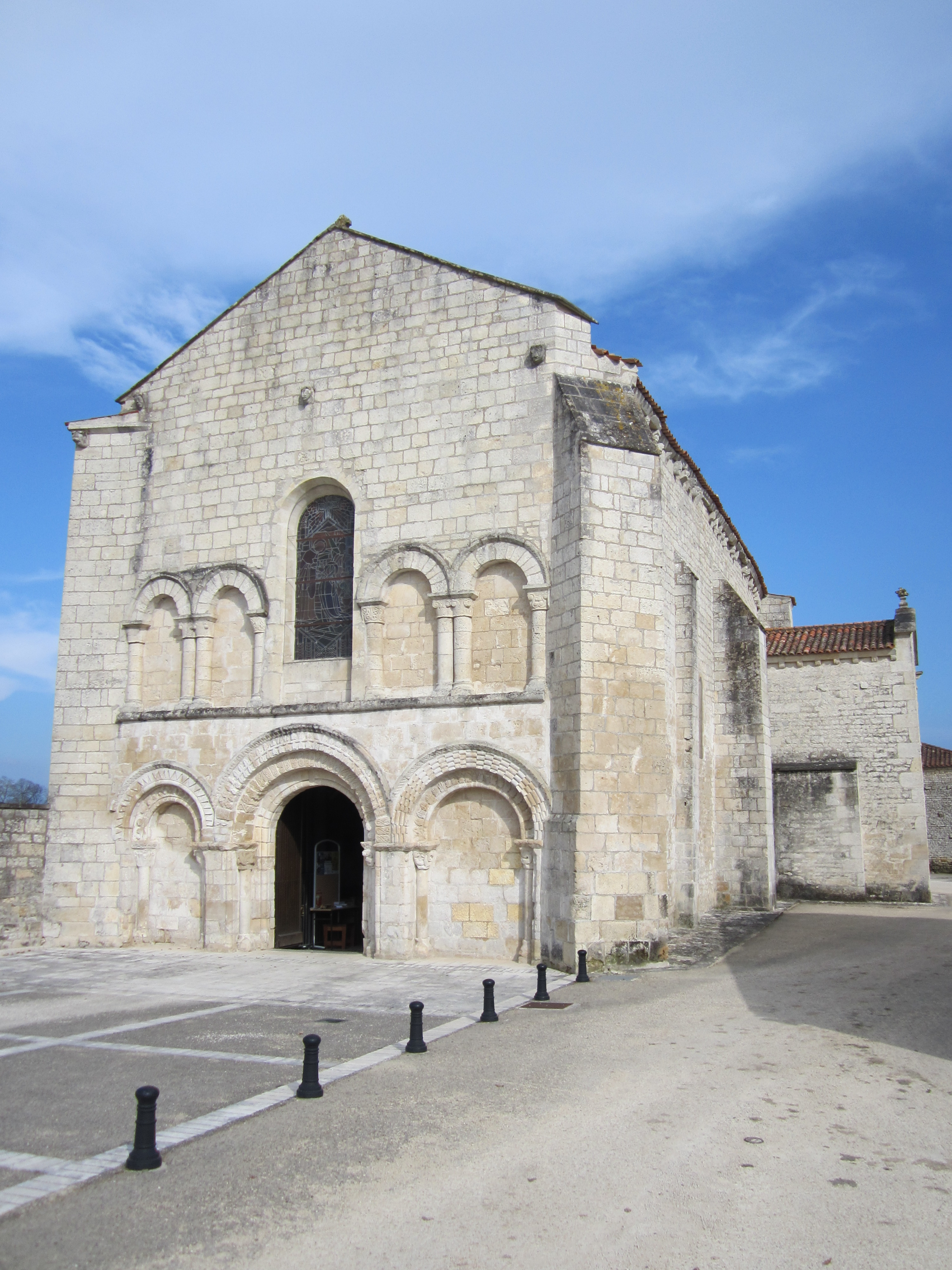
- The church of Our Lady of the Nativity, in Fontaines
- Location of Fontaines
- Location within France Location within Pays de la Loire
- Coordinates: 46°25′33″N 0°49′34″W
- Country: France
- Region: Pays de la Loire
- Department: Vendée
- Arrondissement: Fontenay-le-Comte
- Canton: Fontenay-le-Comte
- Commune: Doix-lès-Fontaines
- Area^{1}: 10.56 km^{2} (4.08 sq mi)
- Highest elevation: 28 m (92 ft)
- Lowest elevation: 0 m (0 ft)
- Population (2022): 772
  - Density: 73.1/km^{2} (189/sq mi)
- Time zone: UTC+01:00 (CET)
  - Summer (DST): UTC+02:00 (CEST)
- Postal code: 85200
- ^{1} French Land Register data, which excludes lakes, ponds, glaciers > 1 km^{2} (0.386 sq mi or 247 acres) and river estuaries.

Fontaines is a former commune in the Vendée department in the Pays de la Loire region in western France. On 1 January 2016, it was merged into the new commune of Doix-lès-Fontaines.

== See also ==
- Communes of the Vendée department
