= Épeigné-sur-Dême =

- Commune
- Location of Épeigné-sur-Dême
- Location within France Location within Centre-Val de Loire
- Coordinates: 47°40′11″N 0°36′52″E
- Country: France
- Region: Centre-Val de Loire
- Department: Indre-et-Loire
- Arrondissement: Chinon
- Canton: Château-Renault

Government
  - Mayor (2020–2026): Stéphane Goué
- Area^{1}: 21.08 km^{2} (8.14 sq mi)
- Highest elevation: 128 m (420 ft)
- Lowest elevation: 66 m (217 ft)
- Population (2023): 162
  - Density: 7.69/km^{2} (19.9/sq mi)
- Time zone: UTC+01:00 (CET)
  - Summer (DST): UTC+02:00 (CEST)
- INSEE/Postal code: 37101 /37370
- ^{1} French Land Register data, which excludes lakes, ponds, glaciers > 1 km^{2} (0.386 sq mi or 247 acres) and river estuaries.

Épeigné-sur-Dême (French pronunciation: [epɛɲe syʁ dɛm]) is a commune in the Indre-et-Loire department in central France.

== Population ==
Historical population
Year	Pop.	±% p.a.
1968	270	—
1975	216	−3.14%
1982	186	−2.11%
1990	172	−0.97%
1999	145	−1.88%
2007	159	+1.16%
2012	166	+0.87%
2017	159	−0.86%
2023	162	+0.31%
Source: INSEE

== See also ==
- Communes of the Indre-et-Loire department
