= Les Hermites =

- Commune
- Coat of arms
- Location of Les Hermites
- Location within France Location within Centre-Val de Loire
- Coordinates: 47°39′55″N 0°45′13″E
- Country: France
- Region: Centre-Val de Loire
- Department: Indre-et-Loire
- Arrondissement: Loches
- Canton: Château-Renault

Government
  - Mayor (2020–2026): Alain Drouet
- Area^{1}: 32.6 km^{2} (12.6 sq mi)
- Highest elevation: 167 m (548 ft)
- Lowest elevation: 96 m (315 ft)
- Population (2023): 583
  - Density: 17.9/km^{2} (46.3/sq mi)
- Time zone: UTC+01:00 (CET)
  - Summer (DST): UTC+02:00 (CEST)
- INSEE/Postal code: 37116 /37110
- ^{1} French Land Register data, which excludes lakes, ponds, glaciers > 1 km^{2} (0.386 sq mi or 247 acres) and river estuaries.

Les Hermites (French pronunciation: [le.z‿ɛʁmit]) is a commune in the Indre-et-Loire department in central France.

== Population ==
Historical population
Year	Pop.	±% p.a.
1968	654	—
1975	552	−2.39%
1982	511	−1.10%
1990	448	−1.63%
1999	536	+2.01%
2007	548	+0.28%
2012	590	+1.49%
2017	562	−0.97%
2023	583	+0.61%
Source: INSEE

== See also ==
- Communes of the Indre-et-Loire department
