= Sonzay =

- Commune
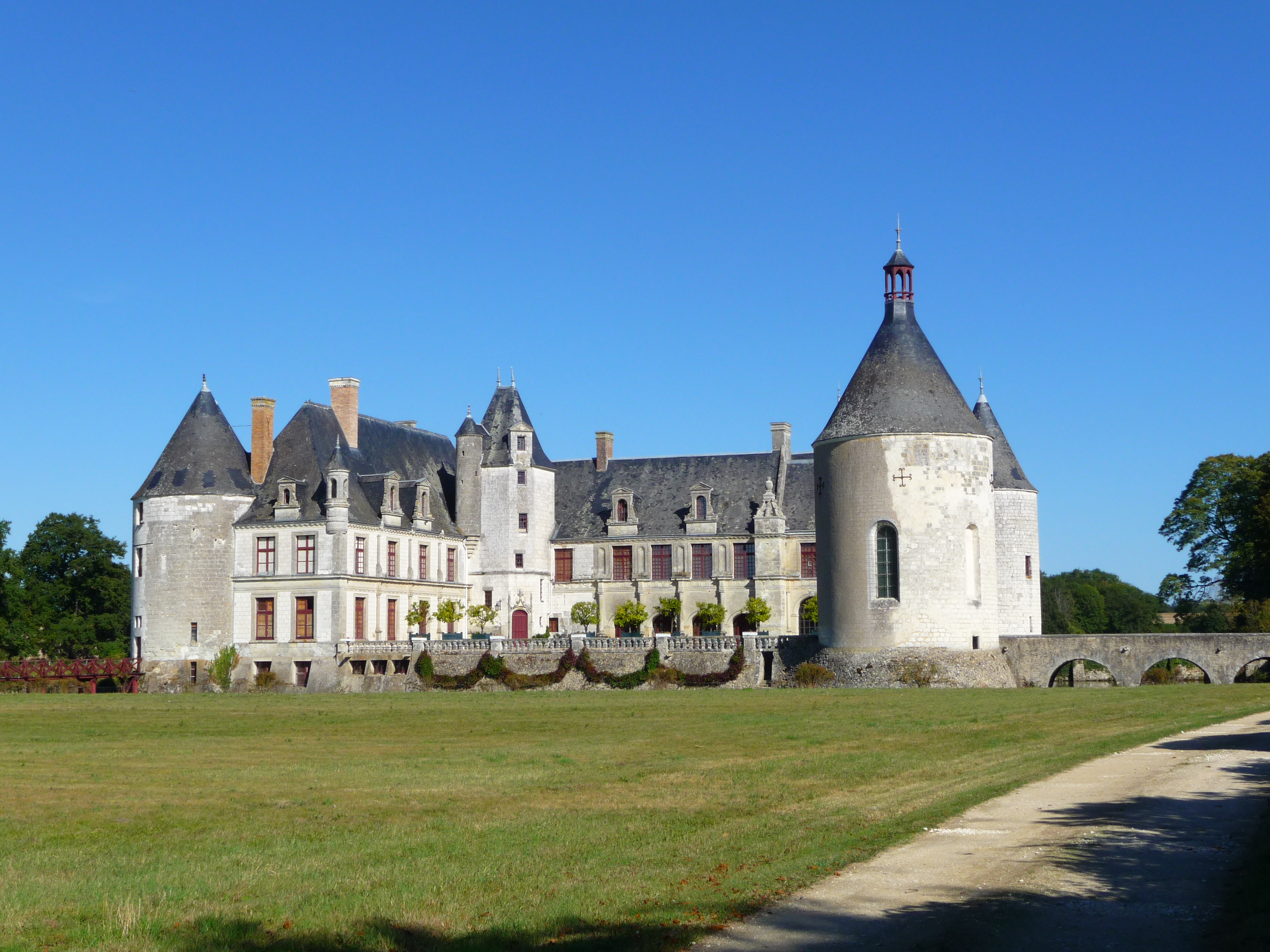
- Chateau of la Motte

- Coat of arms
- Location of Sonzay
- Location within France Location within Centre-Val de Loire
- Coordinates: 47°31′41″N 0°27′47″E
- Country: France
- Region: Centre-Val de Loire
- Department: Indre-et-Loire
- Arrondissement: Chinon
- Canton: Château-Renault

Government
  - Mayor (2020–2026): Jean-Pierre Verneau
- Area^{1}: 48.34 km^{2} (18.66 sq mi)
- Elevation: 106 m (348 ft)
- Highest elevation: 139 m (456 ft)
- Lowest elevation: 78 m (256 ft)
- Population (2023): 1,410
  - Density: 29.2/km^{2} (75.5/sq mi)
- Time zone: UTC+01:00 (CET)
  - Summer (DST): UTC+02:00 (CEST)
- INSEE/Postal code: 37249 /37360
- ^{1} French Land Register data, which excludes lakes, ponds, glaciers > 1 km^{2} (0.386 sq mi or 247 acres) and river estuaries.

Sonzay (French pronunciation: [sɔ̃zɛ]) is a commune in the Indre-et-Loire department in central France.

== Population ==
Historical population
Year	Pop.	±% p.a.
1968	1,005	—
1975	967	−0.55%
1982	935	−0.48%
1990	1,085	+1.88%
1999	1,120	+0.35%
2007	1,252	+1.40%
2012	1,352	+1.55%
2017	1,387	+0.51%
2023	1,410	+0.27%
Source: INSEE

== See also ==
- Communes of the Indre-et-Loire department
