= Nouzilly =

- Commune
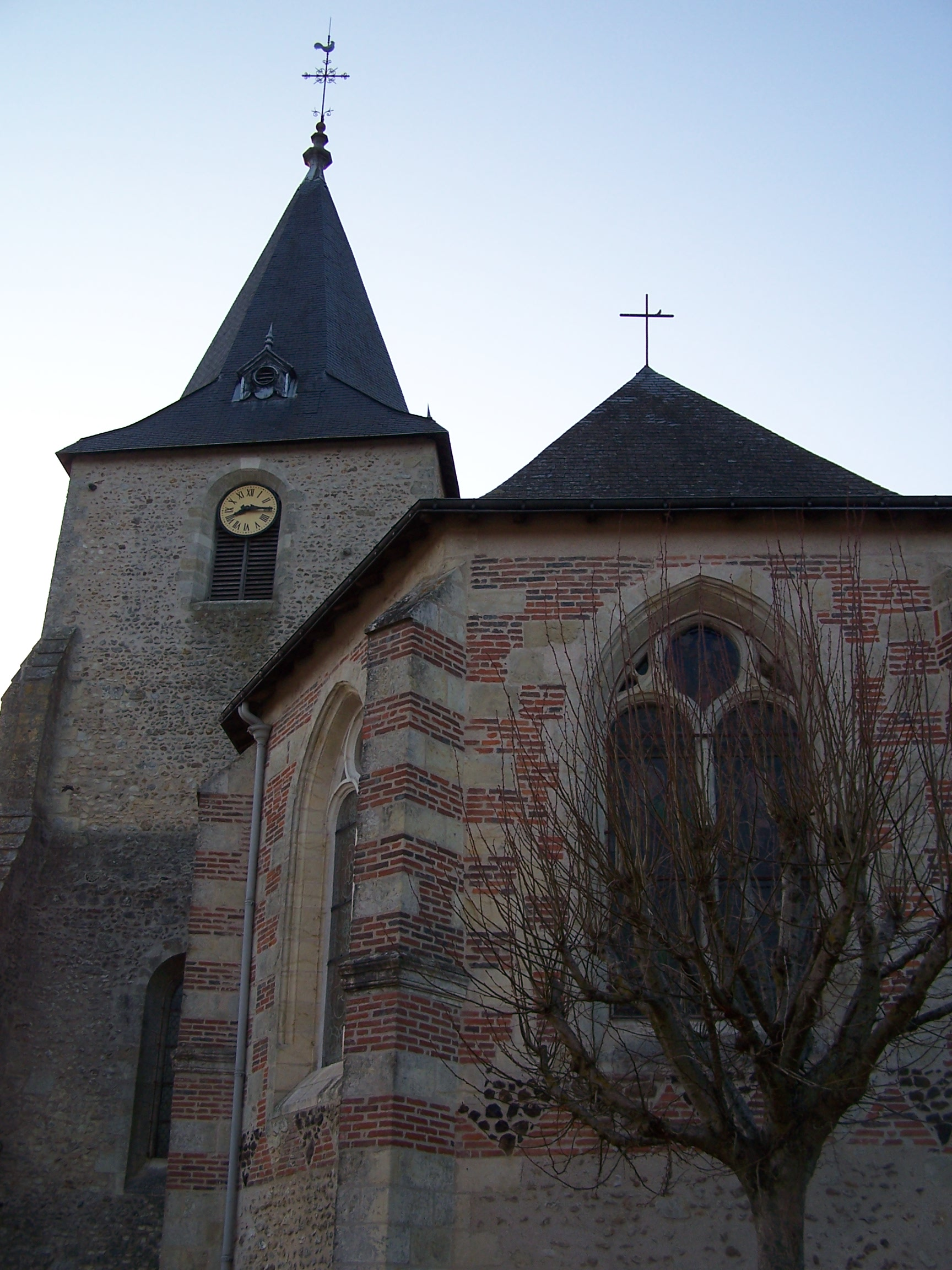
- The church of Saint-André, in Nouzilly

- Coat of arms
- Location of Nouzilly
- Location within France Location within Centre-Val de Loire
- Coordinates: 47°32′38″N 0°44′41″E
- Country: France
- Region: Centre-Val de Loire
- Department: Indre-et-Loire
- Arrondissement: Loches
- Canton: Château-Renault

Government
  - Mayor (2020–2026): Joël Besnard
- Area^{1}: 40.24 km^{2} (15.54 sq mi)
- Highest elevation: 164 m (538 ft)
- Lowest elevation: 75 m (246 ft)
- Population (2023): 1,234
  - Density: 30.67/km^{2} (79.42/sq mi)
- Time zone: UTC+01:00 (CET)
  - Summer (DST): UTC+02:00 (CEST)
- INSEE/Postal code: 37175 /37380
- ^{1} French Land Register data, which excludes lakes, ponds, glaciers > 1 km^{2} (0.386 sq mi or 247 acres) and river estuaries.

Nouzilly (French pronunciation: [nuziji]) is a commune in the Indre-et-Loire department in central France.

== Population ==
Historical population
Year	Pop.	±% p.a.
1968	669	—
1975	666	−0.06%
1982	739	+1.50%
1990	1,086	+4.93%
1999	1,104	+0.18%
2007	1,211	+1.16%
2012	1,257	+0.75%
2017	1,250	−0.11%
2023	1,234	−0.21%
Source: INSEE

== See also ==
- Communes of the Indre-et-Loire department
