= Morand, Indre-et-Loire =

Morand
- Commune
- Coat of arms
- Location of Morand
- Location within France Location within Centre-Val de Loire
- Coordinates: 47°33′48″N 1°00′38″E
- Country: France
- Region: Centre-Val de Loire
- Department: Indre-et-Loire
- Arrondissement: Loches
- Canton: Château-Renault

Government
  - Mayor (2020–2026): Joël Deniau
- Area^{1}: 14.62 km^{2} (5.64 sq mi)
- Highest elevation: 147 m (482 ft)
- Lowest elevation: 104 m (341 ft)
- Population (2023): 351
  - Density: 24.0/km^{2} (62.2/sq mi)
- Time zone: UTC+01:00 (CET)
  - Summer (DST): UTC+02:00 (CEST)
- INSEE/Postal code: 37160 /37110
- ^{1} French Land Register data, which excludes lakes, ponds, glaciers > 1 km^{2} (0.386 sq mi or 247 acres) and river estuaries.

Morand (French pronunciation: [mɔʁɑ̃]) is a commune in the Indre-et-Loire department in central France.

== Population ==
Historical population
Year	Pop.	±% p.a.
1968	237	—
1975	217	−1.25%
1982	218	+0.07%
1990	242	+1.31%
1999	235	−0.33%
2007	287	+2.53%
2012	345	+3.75%
2017	347	+0.12%
2023	351	+0.19%
Source: INSEE

== See also ==
- Communes of the Indre-et-Loire department
