= Château-Renault =

- Commune
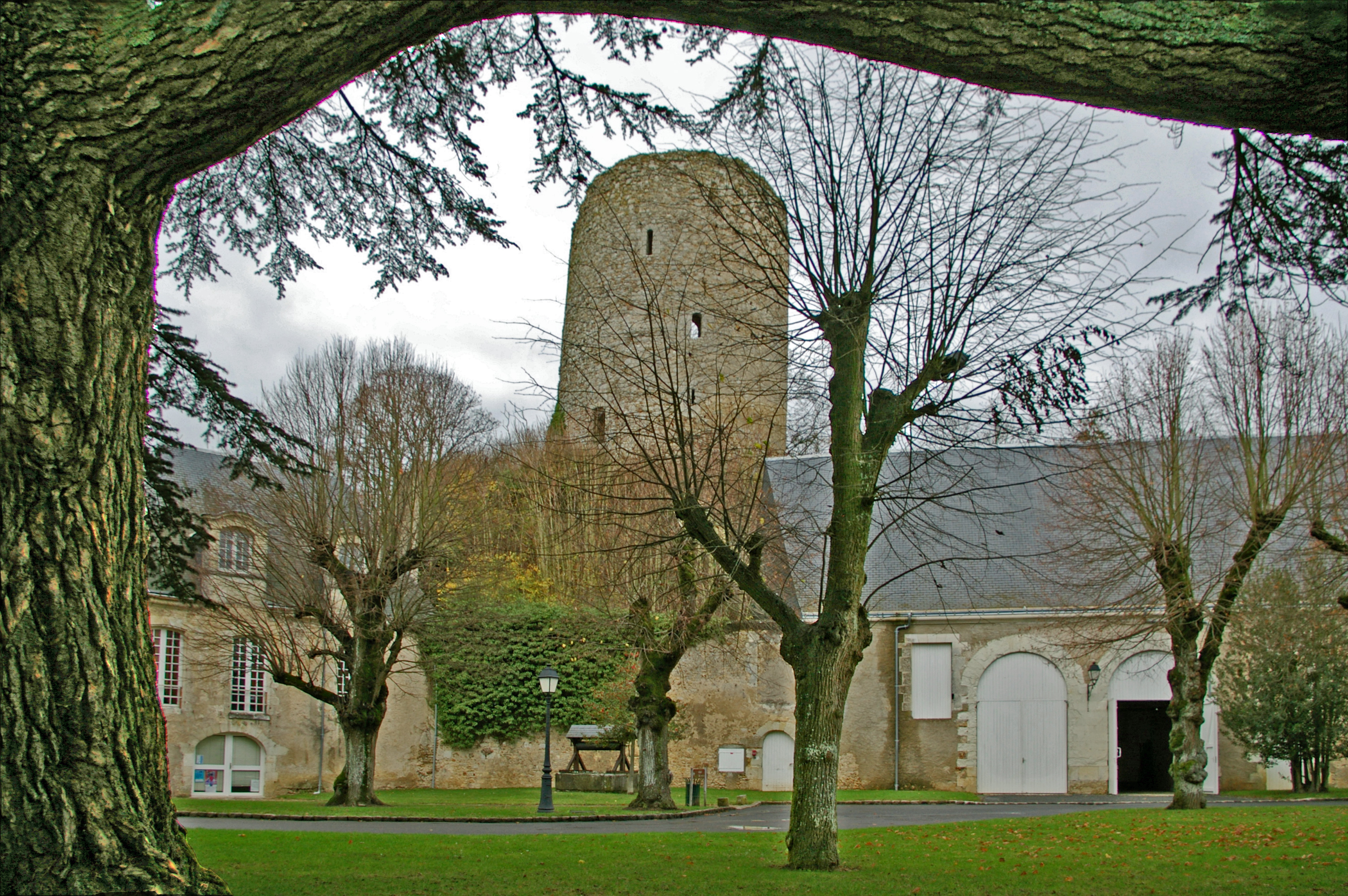
- Chateau

- Coat of arms
- Location of Château-Renault
- Location within France Location within Centre-Val de Loire
- Coordinates: 47°35′32″N 0°54′37″E
- Country: France
- Region: Centre-Val de Loire
- Department: Indre-et-Loire
- Arrondissement: Loches
- Canton: Château-Renault

Government
  - Mayor (2020–2026): Brigitte Dupuis
- Area^{1}: 3.51 km^{2} (1.36 sq mi)
- Highest elevation: 129 m (423 ft)
- Lowest elevation: 83 m (272 ft)
- Population (2023): 4,392
  - Density: 1,250/km^{2} (3,240/sq mi)
- Time zone: UTC+01:00 (CET)
  - Summer (DST): UTC+02:00 (CEST)
- INSEE/Postal code: 37063 /37110
- ^{1} French Land Register data, which excludes lakes, ponds, glaciers > 1 km^{2} (0.386 sq mi or 247 acres) and river estuaries.

Château-Renault (French pronunciation: [ʃɑto ʁəno]) is a commune in the Indre-et-Loire department in central France.

== Geography ==
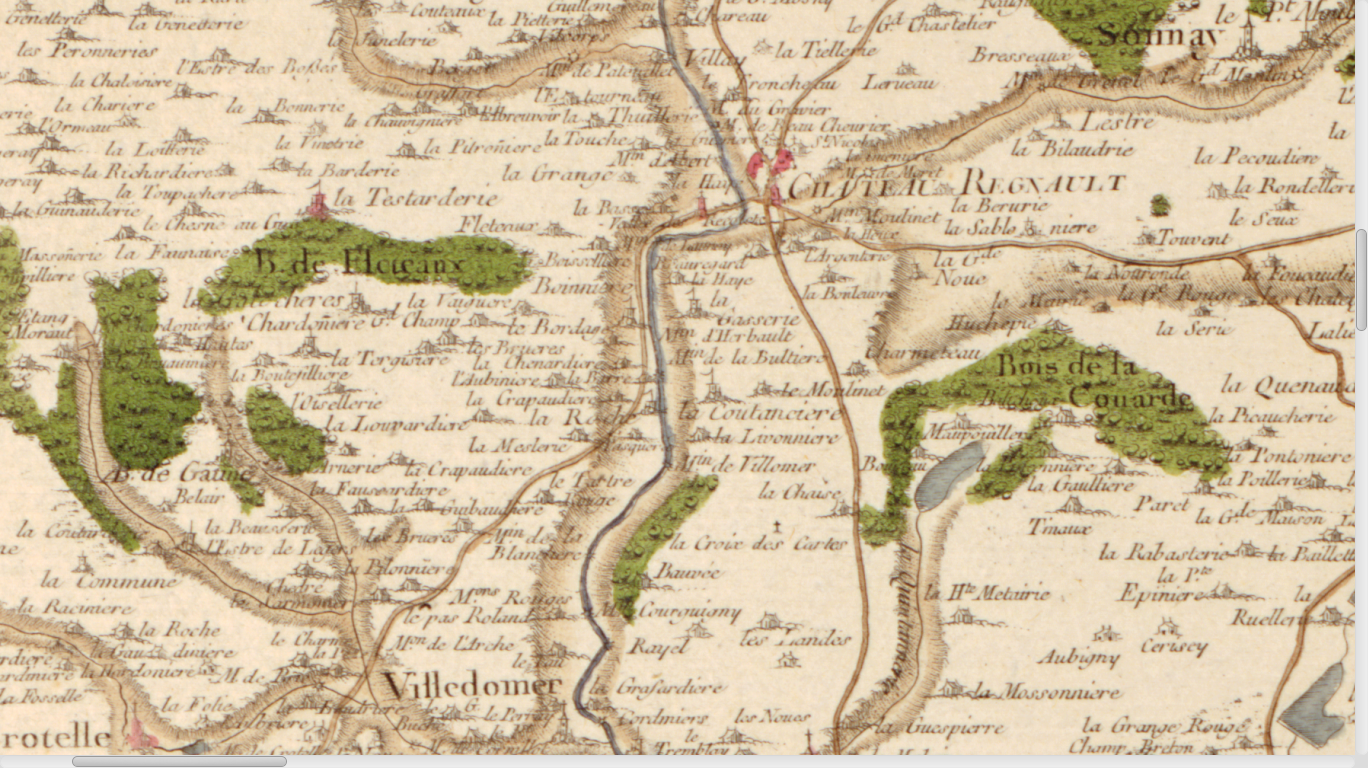
Topography and toponymy, Cassini, 1756.

Château-Renault is located on the Far-West of the Gâtine Tourangelle plateau, next to the Loir-et-Cher department and at the confluence of two rivers : The Gault and the Brenne. Its Elevation vary between 90 meters and 140 meters on the plateau. The area of the commune is 3.51 square kilometre.

Located in the North of A10 highway, the town of Chateau-Renault is equidistant to the cities of Tours and Vendôme and can be reached on train services on the Tours-Paris or Tours-Vendôme lines.

== History ==
=== The town at the Middle Age ===
Evidence of early human occupation or the Loire Valley has been found such as the standing stones of Pierrefite and several hand tools, but the settlement of Chateau-Renault dates from the feudal wars that occurred in the 11th century between the Counts of Blois and the Counts of Anjou. In the early part of the century a loyal member of the court of the Count of Blois was charged by the construction of a defensive structure (most likely a simple wooden tower) on the site of the present chateau. He named this defensive structure after his son, Renaud. This was the origin of the towns name. However, the defensive structure was not enough and the area was soon lost to the Counts of Anjou. It was under the new management that land was donated for the construction of a chapel and a small settlement at the foot of the castle site.

=== The development of tanneries ===
From the early 19th century to the mid 20th century, Château-Renault became famous for its activity of tanning leather. It was ultimately a strong industry that had a big influence on how the town developed. The leather produced was used in shoe production.

High levels of calcium carbonate in the water gave the leather produced there a thick, resistant nature and the arrival of the railway in 1867 ensured that the product had access to a market.

== Demography ==
Historical population

Year	Pop.	±% p.a.
1793	2,030	—
1800	2,518	+3.13%
1806	2,052	−3.35%
1821	2,208	+0.49%
1831	2,468	+1.12%
1836	2,434	−0.28%
1841	2,877	+3.40%
1846	3,108	+1.56%
1851	3,270	+1.02%
1856	3,258	−0.07%
1861	3,562	+1.80%
1866	3,978	+2.23%
1872	3,870	−0.46%
1876	3,831	−0.25%
1881	4,256	+2.13%
1886	4,203	−0.25%
1891	4,397	+0.91%
1896	4,492	+0.43%
1901	4,261	−1.05%

Year	Pop.	±% p.a.
1906	4,299	+0.18%
1911	4,135	−0.77%
1921	4,063	−0.18%
1926	4,097	+0.17%
1931	4,106	+0.04%
1936	3,877	−1.14%
1946	4,180	+0.76%
1954	4,035	−0.44%
1962	4,238	+0.62%
1968	5,125	+3.22%
1975	6,043	+2.38%
1982	6,121	+0.18%
1990	5,787	−0.70%
1999	5,538	−0.49%
2007	5,209	−0.76%
2012	5,060	−0.58%
2017	5,001	−0.23%
2023	4,392	−2.14%

Source: EHESS and INSEE (1968-2023)

== Notable people ==
- André Bauchant, naïve painter, born in Château-Renault in 1873. He died in 1958.
- fr:Jean-François Martin Gardien (1755-1793), member of the Convention parliament.
- fr:Paul Séguin-Bertault (1869-1964), painter born in Château-Renault.
- André Verrier (1919-2013), awarded by the Order of Liberation.

== International relations ==
It is twinned with the towns Ripley (United Kingdom), Mülheim-Kärlich (Germany) and Covăsânț (Romania).

== See also ==
- Communes of the Indre-et-Loire department
