= Neuvy-le-Roi =

- Commune
- Coat of arms
- Location of Neuvy-le-Roi
- Location within France Location within Centre-Val de Loire
- Coordinates: 47°36′12″N 0°35′38″E
- Country: France
- Region: Centre-Val de Loire
- Department: Indre-et-Loire
- Arrondissement: Chinon
- Canton: Château-Renault

Government
  - Mayor (2020–2026): Flavien Thelisson
- Area^{1}: 47.5 km^{2} (18.3 sq mi)
- Highest elevation: 128 m (420 ft)
- Lowest elevation: 75 m (246 ft)
- Population (2023): 1,048
  - Density: 22.1/km^{2} (57.1/sq mi)
- Time zone: UTC+01:00 (CET)
  - Summer (DST): UTC+02:00 (CEST)
- INSEE/Postal code: 37170 /37370
- ^{1} French Land Register data, which excludes lakes, ponds, glaciers > 1 km^{2} (0.386 sq mi or 247 acres) and river estuaries.

Neuvy-le-Roi (French pronunciation: [nøvi lə ʁwa]) is a commune in the Indre-et-Loire department in central France.

== Population ==
Historical population
Year	Pop.	±% p.a.
1968	1,096	—
1975	1,060	−0.48%
1982	992	−0.94%
1990	1,001	+0.11%
1999	1,107	+1.12%
2007	1,184	+0.84%
2012	1,130	−0.93%
2017	1,078	−0.94%
2023	1,048	−0.47%
Source: INSEE

== See also ==
- Communes of the Indre-et-Loire department
