= Marray, Indre-et-Loire =

Marray
- Commune
- Location of Marray
- Location within France Location within Centre-Val de Loire
- Coordinates: 47°37′16″N 0°41′59″E
- Country: France
- Region: Centre-Val de Loire
- Department: Indre-et-Loire
- Arrondissement: Chinon
- Canton: Château-Renault

Government
  - Mayor (2022–2026): Philippe Capon
- Area^{1}: 23.81 km^{2} (9.19 sq mi)
- Highest elevation: 182 m (597 ft)
- Lowest elevation: 89 m (292 ft)
- Population (2023): 496
  - Density: 20.8/km^{2} (54.0/sq mi)
- Time zone: UTC+01:00 (CET)
  - Summer (DST): UTC+02:00 (CEST)
- INSEE/Postal code: 37149 /37370
- ^{1} French Land Register data, which excludes lakes, ponds, glaciers > 1 km^{2} (0.386 sq mi or 247 acres) and river estuaries.

Marray (French pronunciation: [maʁɛ]) is a commune in the Indre-et-Loire department in central France.

== Population ==
Historical population
Year	Pop.	±% p.a.
1968	348	—
1975	301	−2.05%
1982	272	−1.44%
1990	262	−0.47%
1999	337	+2.84%
2007	399	+2.13%
2012	426	+1.32%
2017	471	+2.03%
2023	496	+0.87%
Source: INSEE

== See also ==
- Communes of the Indre-et-Loire department
