= List of former bridges in Blois =

Satellite view of the former bridges of Blois.

During its history, the city of Blois included various bridges, mainly over the Loire river, but also over the Cosson river, one of its tributaries.

== Bridges over the Loire river ==
=== The Dike bridge ===
As early as the Roman Empire, between BCE 20 and 300, a permanent river crossing system was built downstream of the medieval bridge and the current Jacques-Gabriel Bridge. This rather rudimentary system consisted of various submersible artificial islands aligned diagonally and alternating with flooded passages, known as dike (duits in French). Such a dike bridge seems to have been built and used to make it possible to link the two banks on which two independent villages developed: Castrum Blesense on the right bank and Vienna on a river island at the other side.

=== The Ancient bridge ===
Between the 1st and 2nd centuries the first proper bridge was also built to join the two banks. Also known as Gallo-Roman bridge, it was further downstream from the present-day Jacques-Gabriel Bridge, between the former Hall of Louis XII (now Maison de la BD, on the right bank) and Rue Munier (in Vienne). It was a mainly wooden bridge, whose the foundations are visible when the river experiences drought flow. The piles, all squared, come from oak trees and form 9 "clouds", testifying to a bridge with nine pillars.

The dating of the remains was estimated by carbon-14 analysis and dendrochronology techniques.

=== The Medieval bridge ===
A second bridge in wood and stone is first mentioned from 1089 onwards in a document in which the newly Count Stephen attests to the ownership of two mills built on the bridge and owned by the abbot of Pontlevoy. In 2003, French National Institute for Preventive Archaeological Research (INRAP) confirmed by radiocarbon dating that the oaks used for the foundations of this structure dated from somewhen between 998 and 1159. It would thus seem that its construction was ordered and financed by Count Stephen's grandfather, Count Odo II, who was on the initiative of the Medieval Bridge of Tours construction between 1034 and 1037.

The medieval bridge of Blois was located 70m downstream from the modern Jacques-Gabriel Bridge. The foundations of most of its 19 stone pillars are also visible when the river's water lever is low. These are responsible for the water backwash downstream of the modern bridge.

In the Middle Ages the river was more heavily developed: on the bridge, there were also houses, towers (including a gate-tower on the fortified right bank), a chapel as well as stairs to a submersible dike, on which there were 5 water mills, fisheries and a small port. This dike, also visible when the water level is low, originally crossed the river from the bridge to St Nicolas Church, and was then reinforced and extended in the 13th century to the level of La Creusille Harbor to divert the river's flow to the right bank.

Very early on Counts of Blois understood the geostrategic importance of this bridge, hence the presence of a gate-tower at the entrance to the town, thus introducing a toll tax on all new entrants. At the time, it was the only bridge over the Loire river for many miles, which explains why so many activities were concentrated on it.

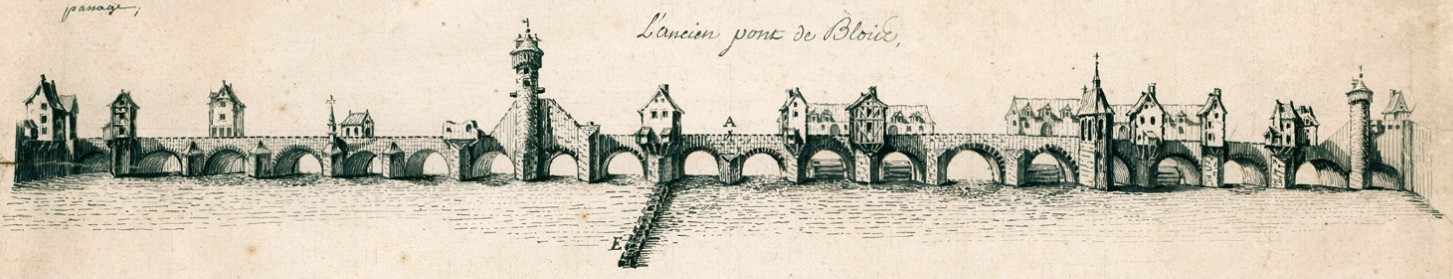
Engraving of the medieval bridge between Blois (on the right) and Vienne (on the left).

On the night during 6 and 7 February 1716, the bridge collapsed under the pressure of a violent ice jam break-up on the river. One year later, the construction of the Jacques-Gabriel Bridge began, and lasted until 1724.

== Bridges over the Cosson river ==
=== Chartrain bridges ===
Map of Vienne island, with the Medieval bridge, the Chartrain bridges and the St Michel bridges.

So-called Chartrain bridges provided a means of crossing a wet, flood-prone area between the steam bed of the Loire river and the Cosson river, between Vienne island and Vineuil (on the East of Vienne), on the left bank. From their construction in 1201 until the 18th century, the fastest road from Chartres to Bourges passed over these bridges, but they are probably incorrectly called "Chartrain", as they were originally described as "chastré bridges" (ponts chastrés in French), to indicate a sort of overpass.

Indeed, until the construction in 1717 of a levee in the extension of La Creusille Harbor, La Bouillie area was a wetland subject to flooding in the event of flooding, but sometimes considered to be a secondary constant steam bed of the Loire river. After that year, the area was drained, roads were built to connect the former river island to the villages on the left bank, and the bridges fell into disuse. The Chartrain bridges remain as a small tarmac road.

Since 2006 the infrastructure has been classified as a historical monument.

=== St Michel bridges ===
Just like the precedent ones, the St Michel bridges enabled it to be reached Vienne but from Saint-Gervais-la-Forêt, on the West. Built and used over the same period, and starting from the present rue des Métairies, this elevated road gave access to the lower part of St-Gervais.

But unlike the Chartrain bridges, there are very few remains of the St Michel bridges. After the successive 100-year floods of the 19th century, the bridges were badly damaged and required extensive work. Almost the entire structure was razed in 1867 and then destroyed in 1885 to allow for the construction of the current extension of the rue des Métairies. The present mill bridge over the Cosson was built in 1868 on the remains of the old bridges. Today, all that remains of the St Michel bridges are 6 stone pillars in the middle of a pond, located between the levee and the auberge espagnole (local hotel).
