= Saint Saturnin's Churchyard (Blois) =

- Aître Saint-Saturnin in French
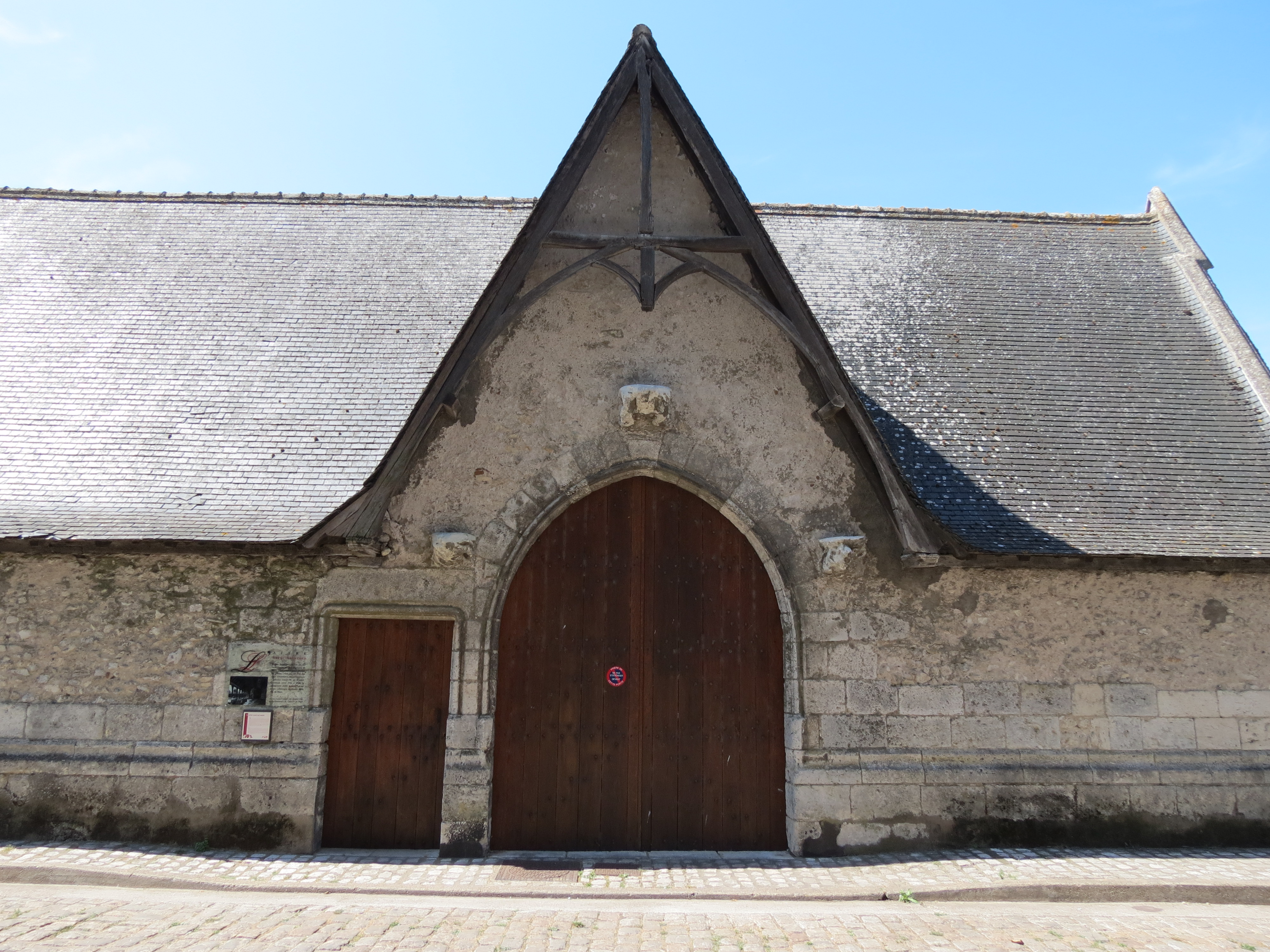
- Main entrance of the St. Saturnin's Churchyard
- Interactive map of the Saint Saturnin's Churchyard area

General information
- Type: Churchyard
- Architectural style: Flamboyant gothic
- Location: Rue Munier (Munier Street), Blois, France
- Coordinates: 47°34′54″N 1°20′15″E
- Construction started: 1516–1520
- Renovated: 2024–2026

Saint Saturnin's Churchyard (in French: aître Saint-Saturnin) is a unique monument located in the Vienne district of Blois, in central France. Formerly a cemetery, it is now a lapidary museum belonging to the municipality. The building is currently being renovated.

This is one of the last 4 churchyards remaining in France nowadays.

== History ==
=== The parish burial site ===
The land was acquired in two stages between August 1515 and 1516 by the parish of Saint-Saturnin's churchwardens who established a cemetery there to supplement an existing but overcrowded one. The latter were supported by newly king Francis I, whose salamander emblem can still be seen on the walls.

The choice of building such a churchyard reflects the architectural trend of the early Renaissance: the cemetery became a sober garden surrounded by galleries, in the middle of which the bodies are buried to decompose before the bones are brought back under the arcades. The galleries were therefore charnel houses and ossuaries. Like many of its predecessors, the one at Saint Saturnin is decorated with sculptures evoking the theme of death, but also that of the danse macabre^{,}.

At the end of the 18th century, hygienism led to the relocation of many burial sites further away from homes and towns. In Blois-Vienne, the churchyard was abandoned after the French Revolution. The deceased were buried in a space accessible from Rue Clérancerie, but as this plot was too close to the aître and the rest of the faubourg, the municipality of Mayor Jean-Marie Pardessus decided in 1807 to open the current Blois-Vienne cemetery, at the beginning of Rue de la Croix-Rouge.

=== The hospital's laundry room ===
As soon as it was announced that the aître was to be abandoned for its funeral functions, the Vienne General Hospital, then established within the Gaston d'Orléans residence, offered to acquire the building to use as its laundry-drying room.

The building was classified as a historical monument in 1886.

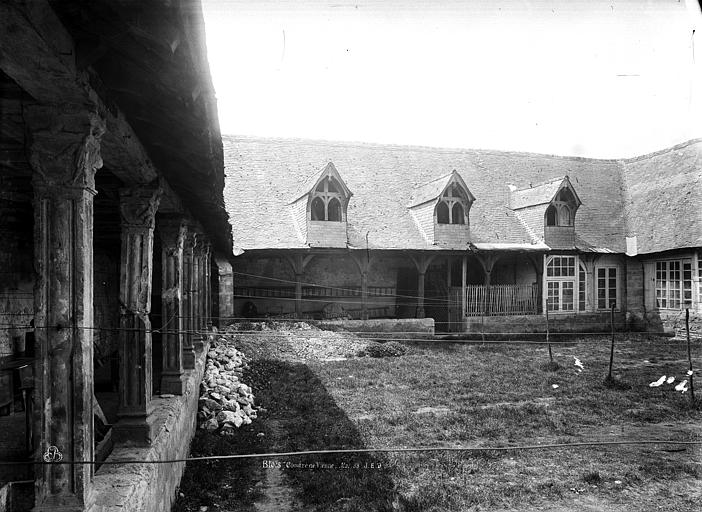
The churchyard garden used for drying the hospital's laundry.

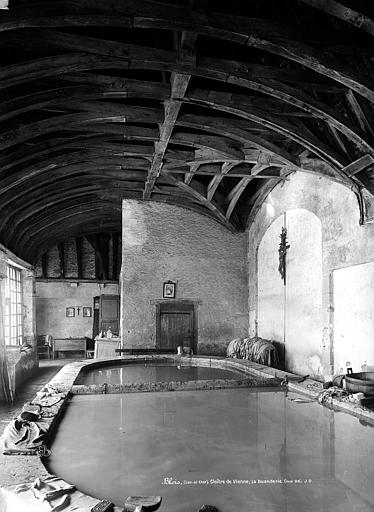
The basin for washing clothes under one of the churchyard galleries.

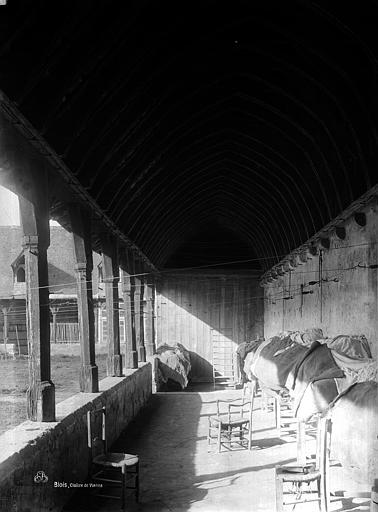
Another gallery in the churchyard used for storage.

=== The museum of the city's remains ===
In 1923, Dr Frédéric Lesueur, then curator of the municipal museum, published Le Cimetière de Saint-Saturnin à Blois, a book that explained the architectural and cultural value of the building. According to him, it was a relatively well-preserved building because it had not been restored, despite significant modifications made when the activity changed.

His work encouraged the city of Blois to acquire the monument in 1923. Until 1934, Doctor Lesueur struggled to make it a place to store parts of restored buildings.

After the bombings of 15 to 18 June 1940, Dr Lesueur endeavoured to bring together numerous architectural pieces that had been more or less intact among the rubble in the "Saint-Saturnin lapidary depot". His work thus made it possible to preserve an important collection of precious elements of these buildings lost during World War II.

For many decades, the Saint-Saturnin's Churchyard was neglected and the municipality offered only brief activities or tours of its walls. Nevertheless, the complete restoration of the monument has been announced for 2023, and should be completed by 2026.

== Open to the public ==
Visits to the Saint-Saturnin's Churchyard are organised from time to time by the town of Blois and the Amis du Vieux Blois association.
