= Blois-Vienne Church =

Catholic church in Loir-et-Cher, in France

Blois-Vienne Church St. Saturnin Church of Blois
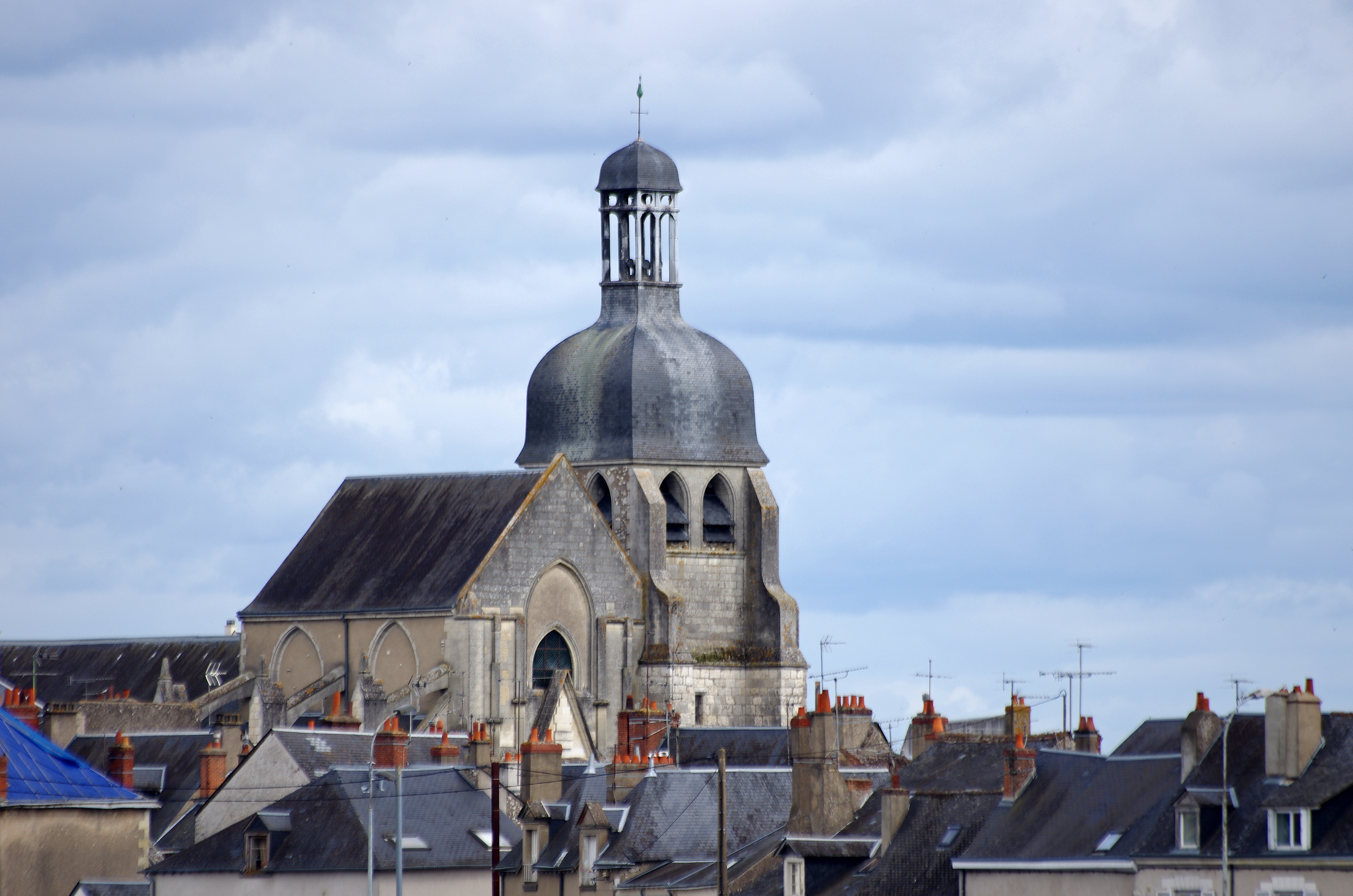
- Blois-Vienne Church

Religion
- Affiliation: Roman Catholic Church
- Province: Diocese of Blois
- Rite: Roman
- Ecclesiastical or organisational status: Church
- Status: Active

Location
- Location: Blois, France
- Interactive map of Blois-Vienne Church; St. Saturnin Church of Blois
- Coordinates: 47°34′55″N 1°20′16″E

Architecture
- Type: Church
- Style: Flamboyant Gothic
- Groundbreaking: c. 1500
- Completed: 1528

Blois-Vienne Church (Église Saint-Saturnin de Blois in French) is a Roman Catholic church located on the left bank of the Loire river in the city of Blois, France.

It was originally built between circa 1500 and 1528. The edifice is in the late Flamboyant Gothic style.

Its west side is oriented to one of the 4 last churchyards in France: Saint Saturnin's Churchyard.

== History ==
=== Origins ===
Between the 10th and 11th centuries, a Catholic church was established in Vienne-lez-Blois, on the left bank of the Loire, right in front of the town center of Blois, located at the present-day 13 rue Munier. Firstly known as St. Saturnin church, since the parish was dedicated to St. Saturnin of Toulouse, its name changed several times afterwards: St. Germain of Vienne church in 1326, then St. Cernin church in 1391, and finally St. Cerny church in 1449.

=== Site of pilgrimage ===
Since its establishment, the successive Blois-Vienne churches have always been modest buildings. It was also located on one of the pilgrimage routes of the Way of St James. During the Middle Ages, Vienne was one the favored transit points for those pilgrims walking on the Tours Route (on the Via Turonensis starting in Paris and passing next to the Loire river).

However, during the 15th and 16th centuries, it became an important place of worship. It is said that Viennese boatmen discovered a statue of Mary in the Loire river, next to La Creusille Harbor, and that they were the first in the church to implore her help. During this period, a custom was established in Bloisian of going to pray to Vienne-lez-Blois Church to the "Our Lady of Assistance" (Notre-Dame des Aydes in French).

=== Construction ===
Over the centuries, the church has been destroyed and rebuilt several times. This was due to fires and storms that ravaged the church on several occasions. However, after each destruction, there has had a reconstruction and new developments.

The construction of the current church was ordered by Queen Anne of Brittany a few years after 1499, when she married newly King Louis XII who was established in Blois. However, this was interrupted when she died in 1514. A reconstruction project was set up in the early 16th century but remained unfinished. However, this project led to new developments in the church: a gallery cemetery was created between 1515 and 1520, as well as a chapel in 1528.

During the French Wars of Religion, Protestants set fire to the building's framework in 1568. A new reconstruction project changed the entire style of the church with the creation of ribbed vaults between 1570 and 1578.

A violent storm broke out on 8 June 1678, and destroyed the bell tower.

After the French Revolution, at the end of the 18th century, works were resumed but interrupted by the Terror. During this period, the revolutionaries ransacked many religious premises in Blois, including St. Saturnin in Vienne, to stop "superstition and fanaticism". In the process, the parish lost a large part of its paintings, wooden statues and doors, which were burnt.

=== Modern era ===
Since 1807, the cemetery is not used anymore, and has been converted into a lapidary museum since 1934.

During the Loire river floods of 1856, the church was inundated, but not in 1846, neither in 1866.

The overall edifice was listed as a historical monument by order of 11 July 1942.

== Gallery ==
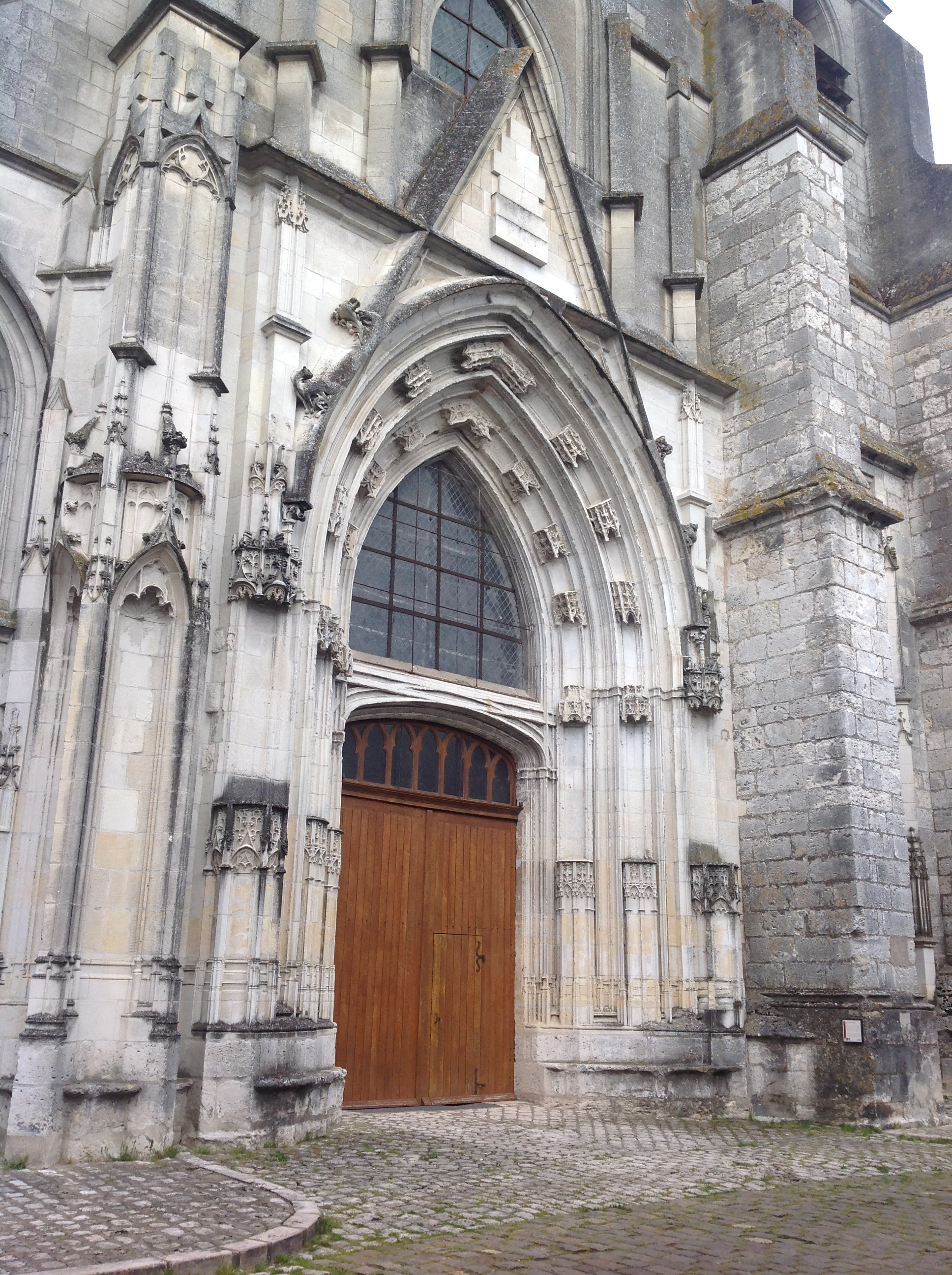
West front of the church

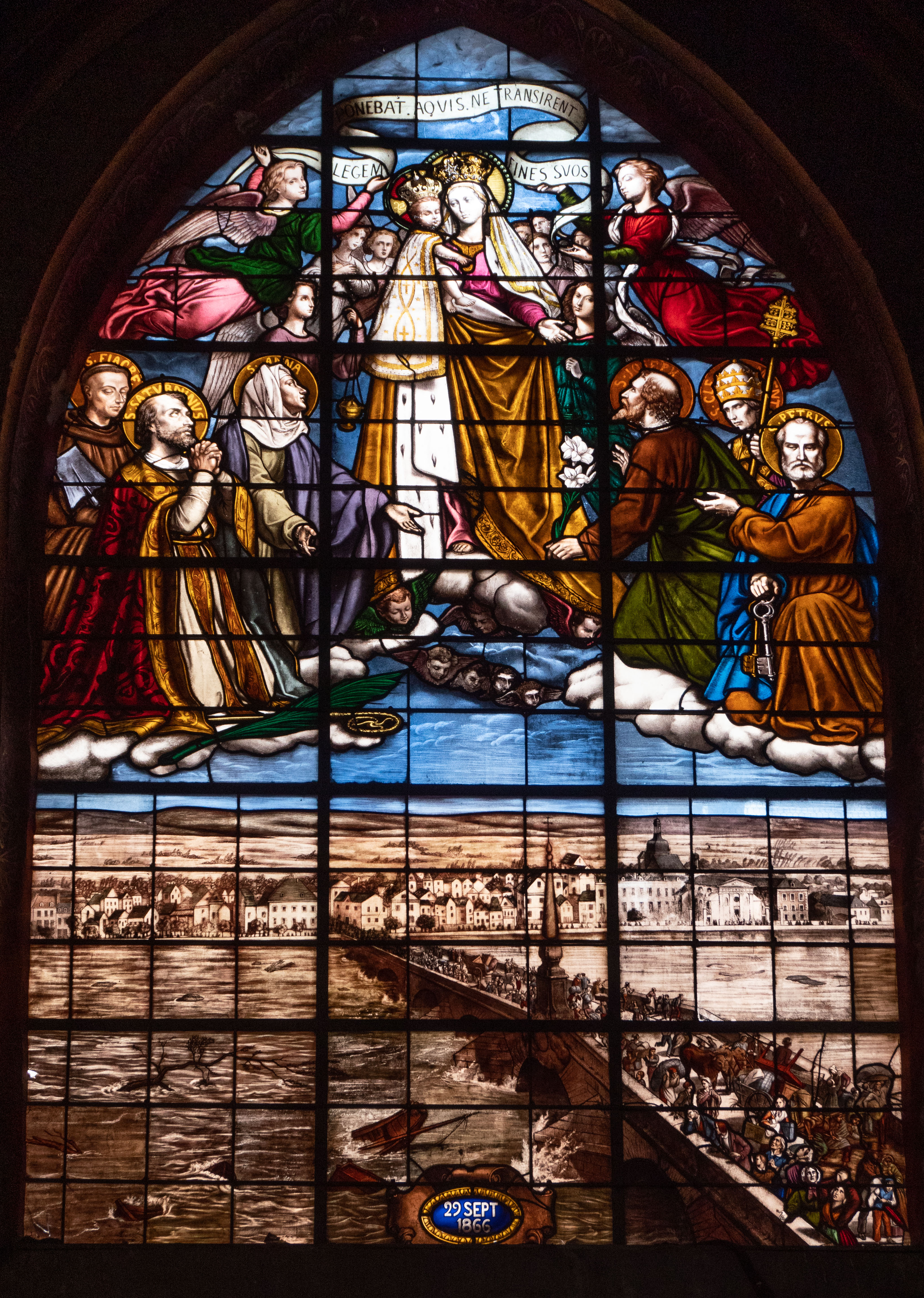
Stained glass window of the invocation to "Our Lady of Assistance" to save the suburb of Vienne from flooding in 1866

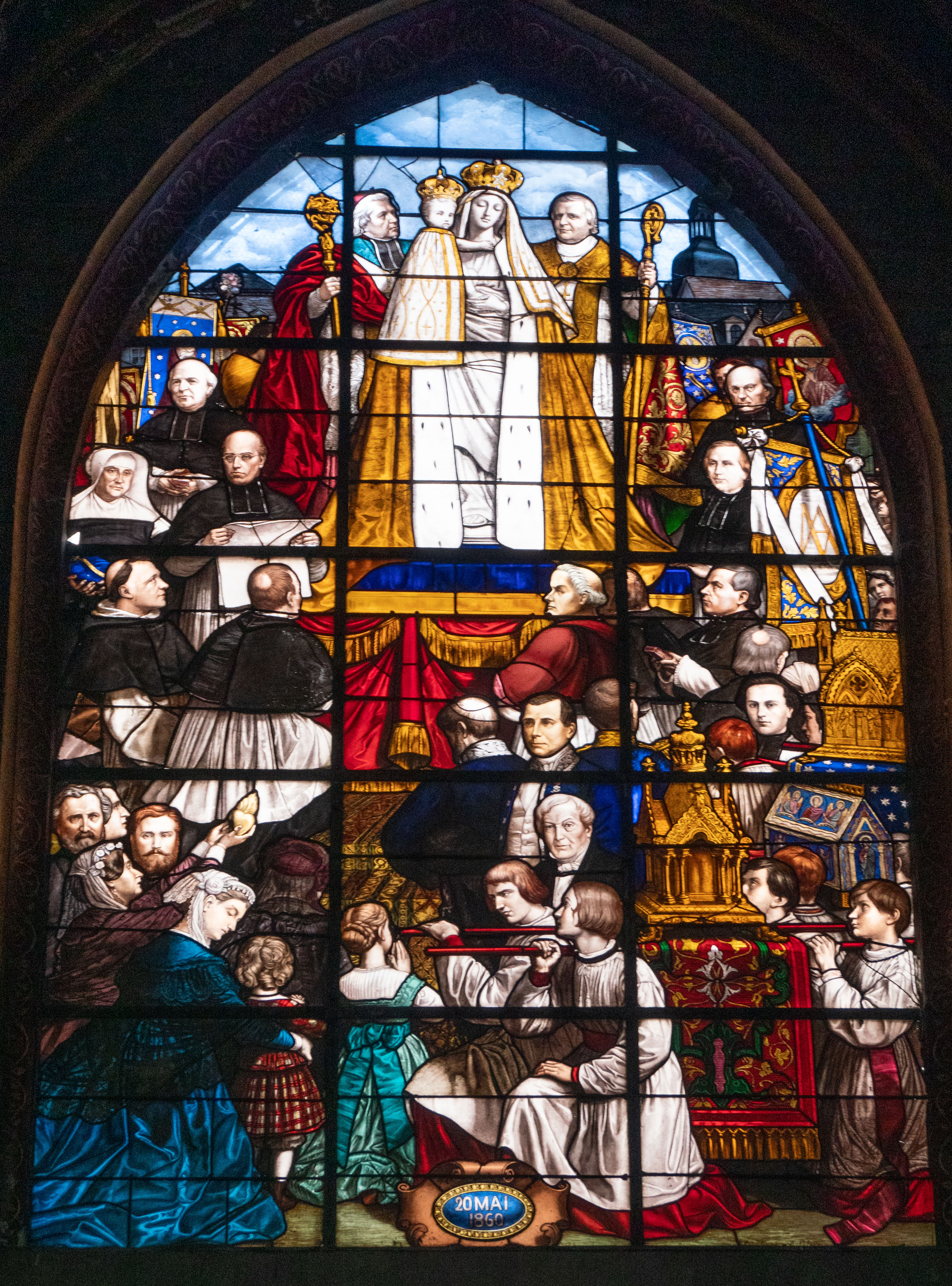
Stained glass window of the coronation of "Our Lady of Assistance”

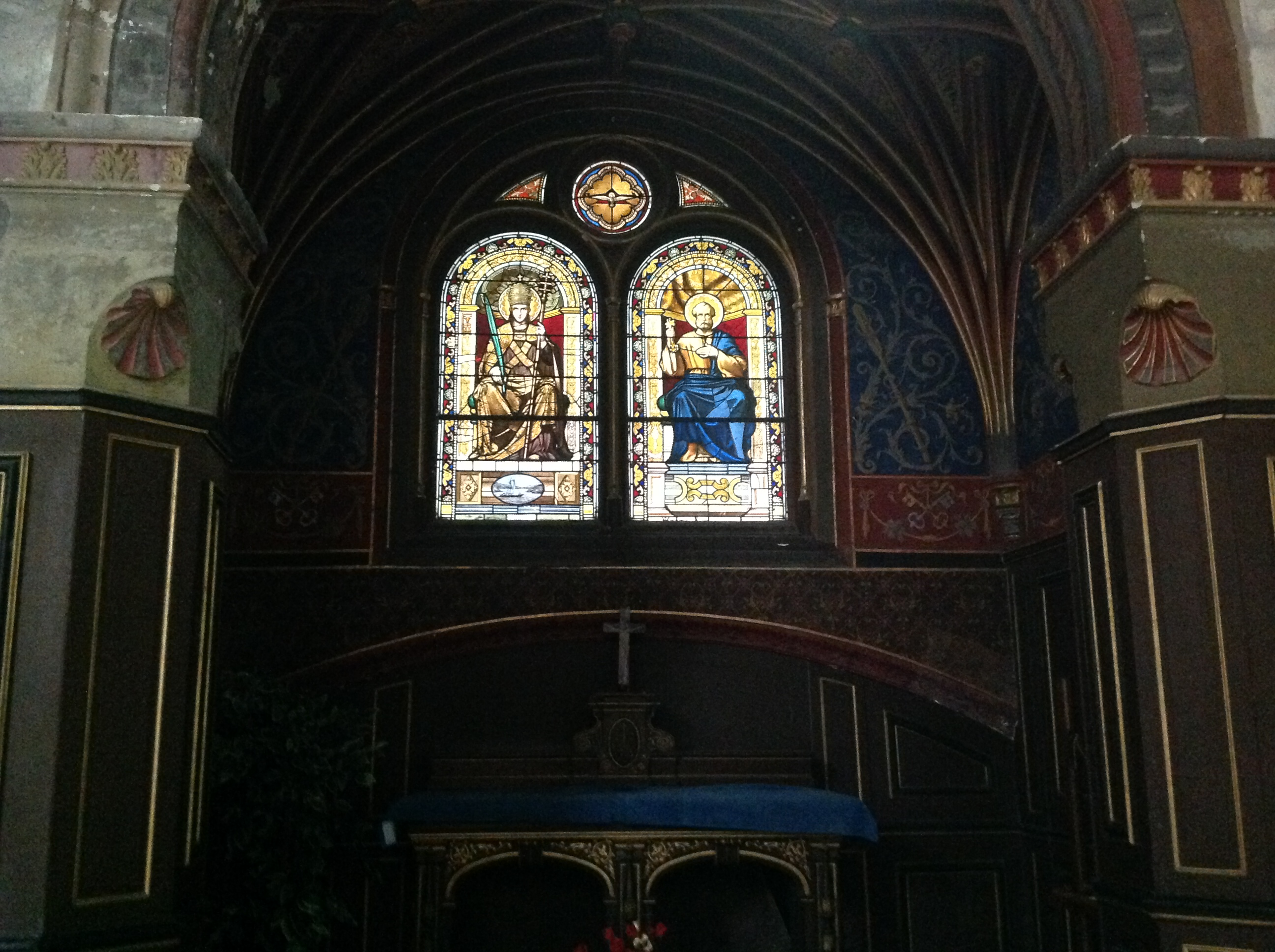
Diptych of St Peter and St Clement

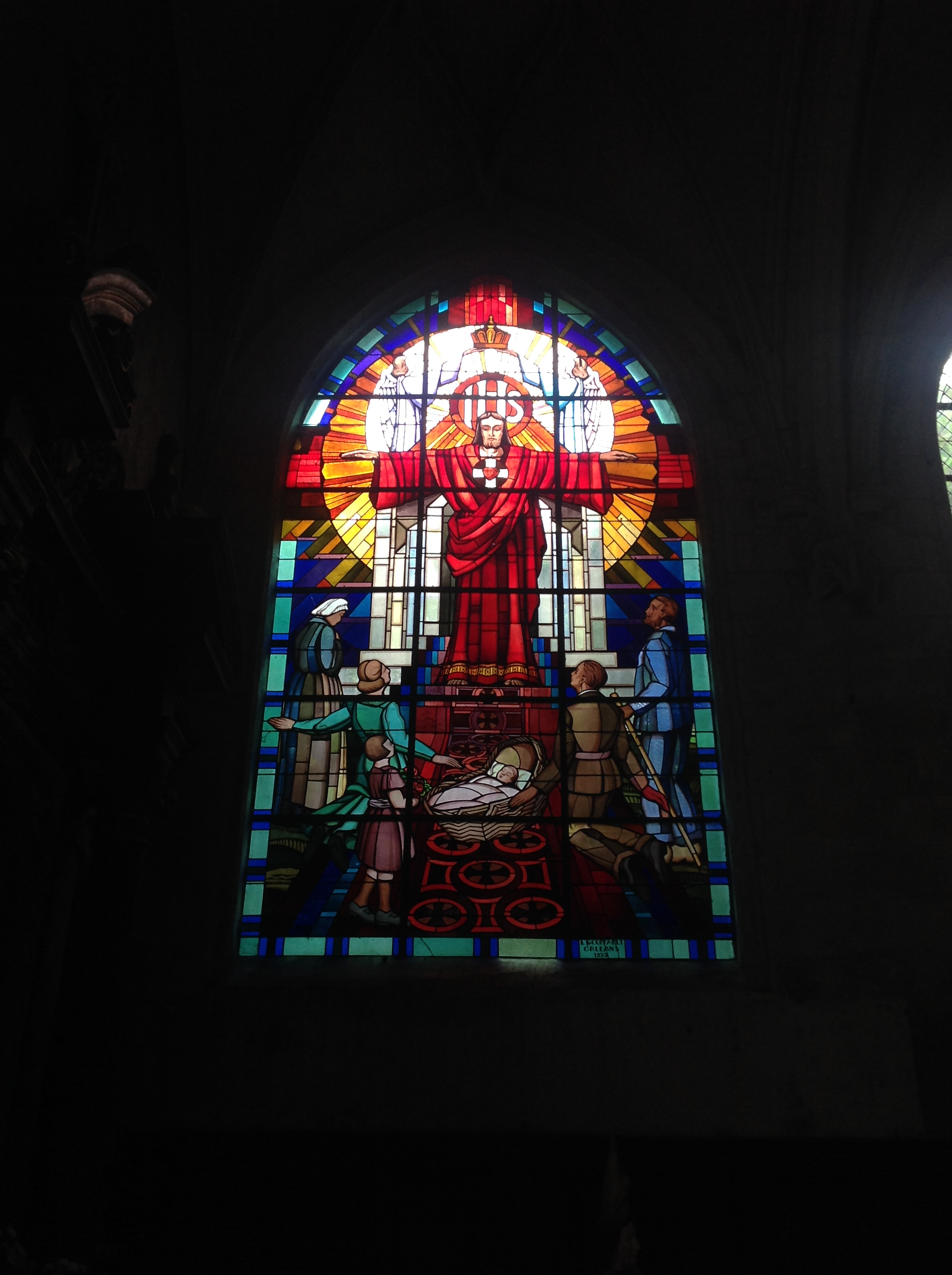
Stained glass window of Sacred Heart in Art Deco style
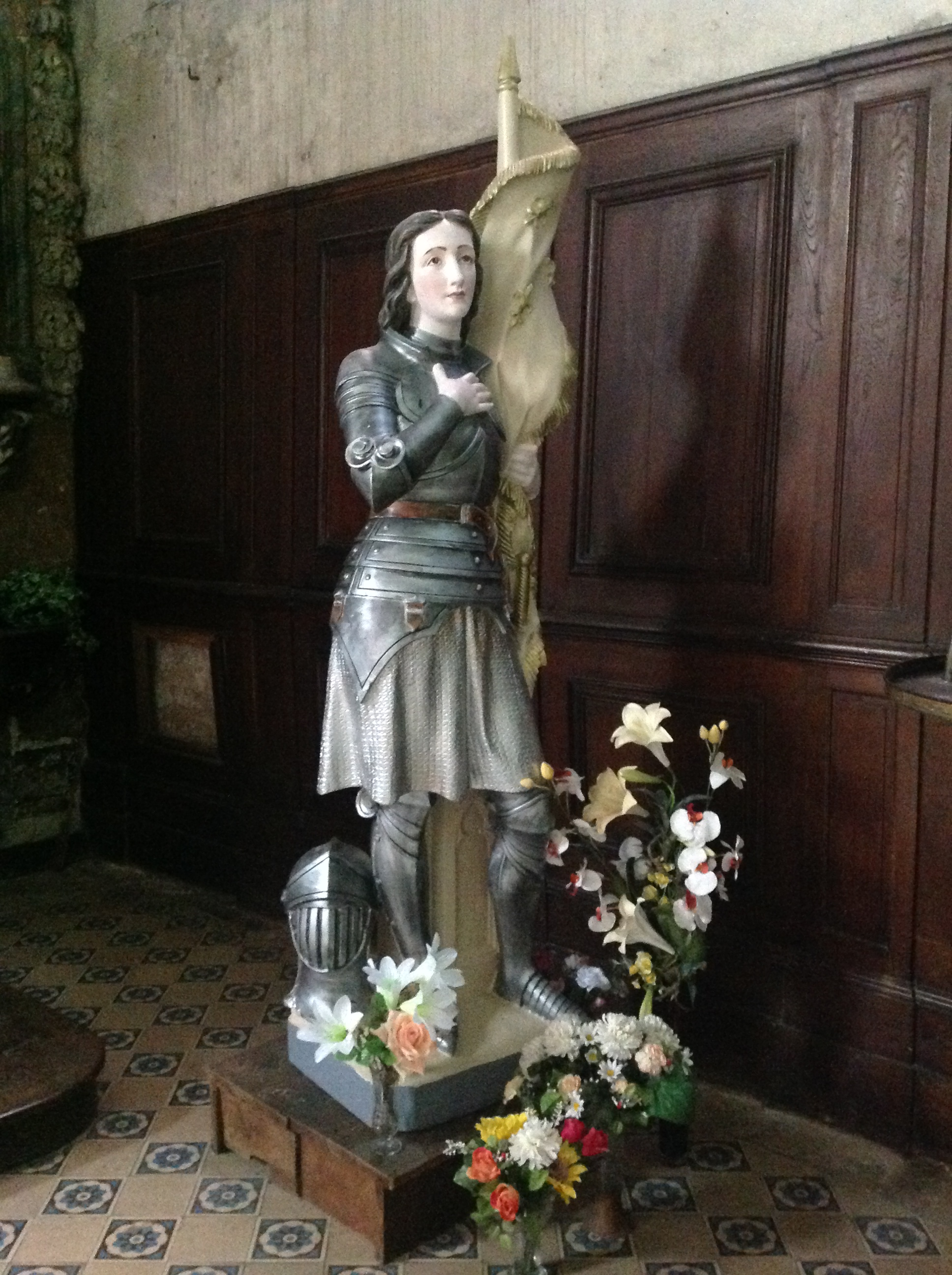
Statue of Joan of Arc

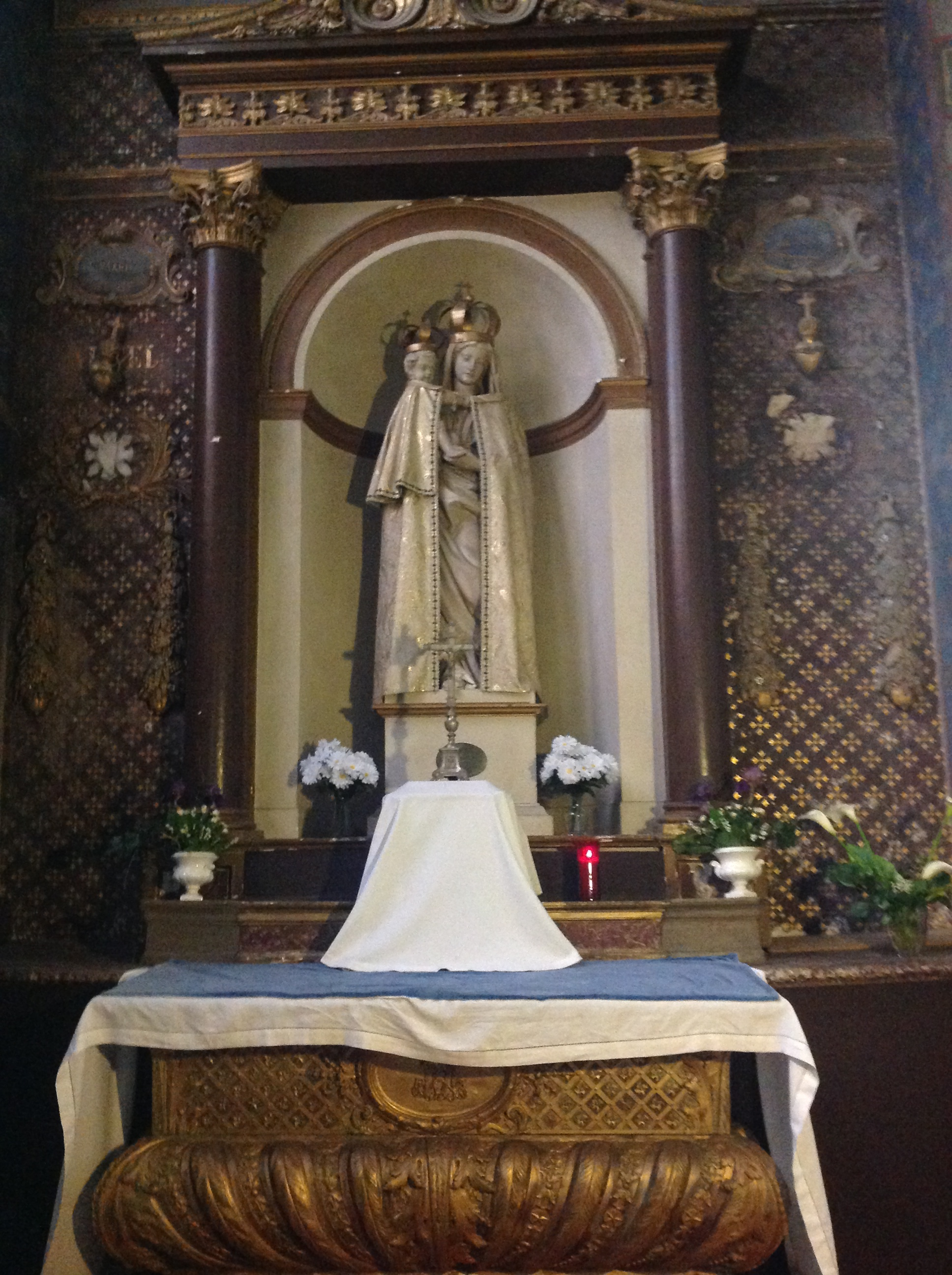
Statue of "Our Lady of Assistance”

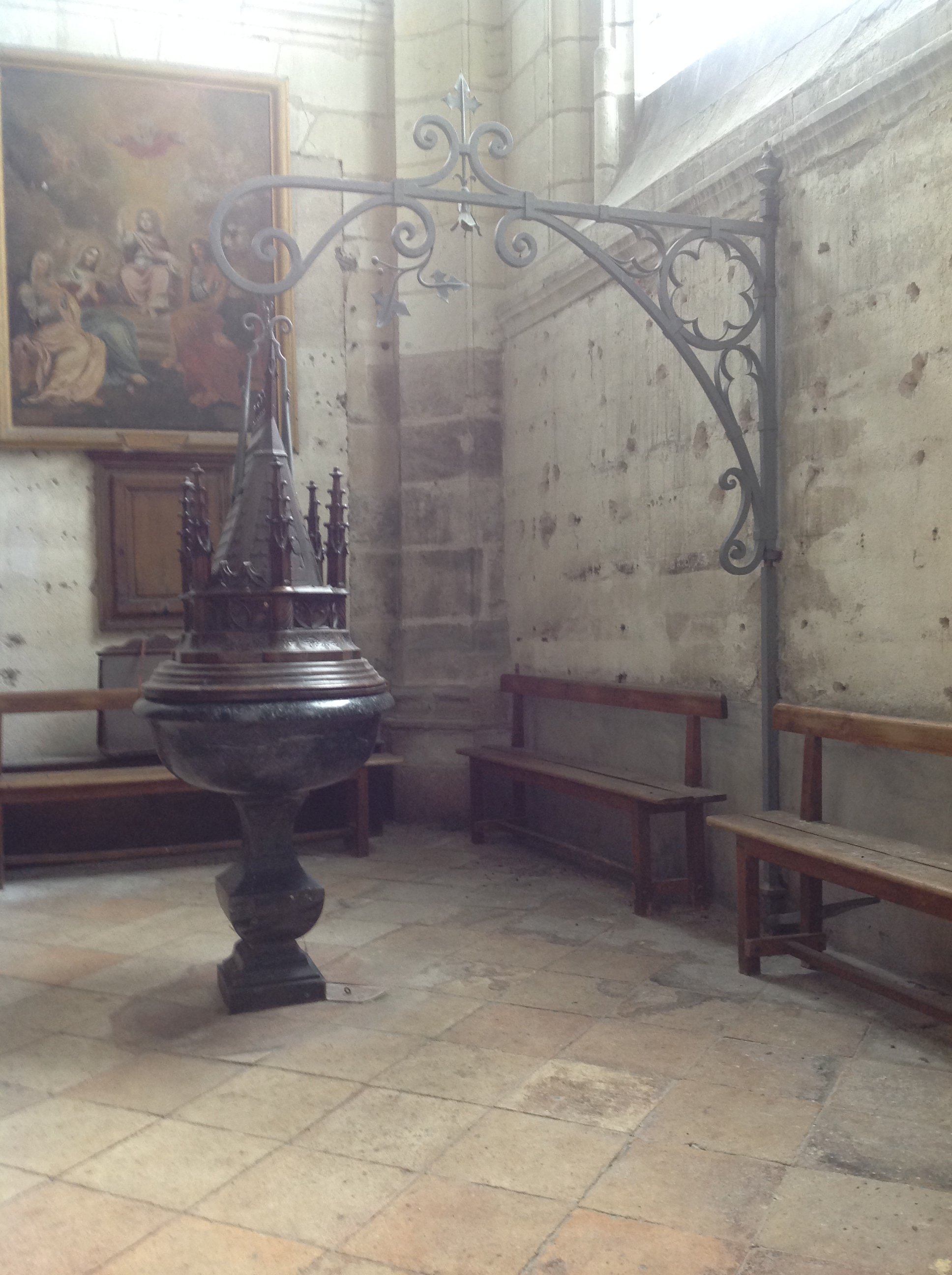
Baptismal font with gallows baptistery

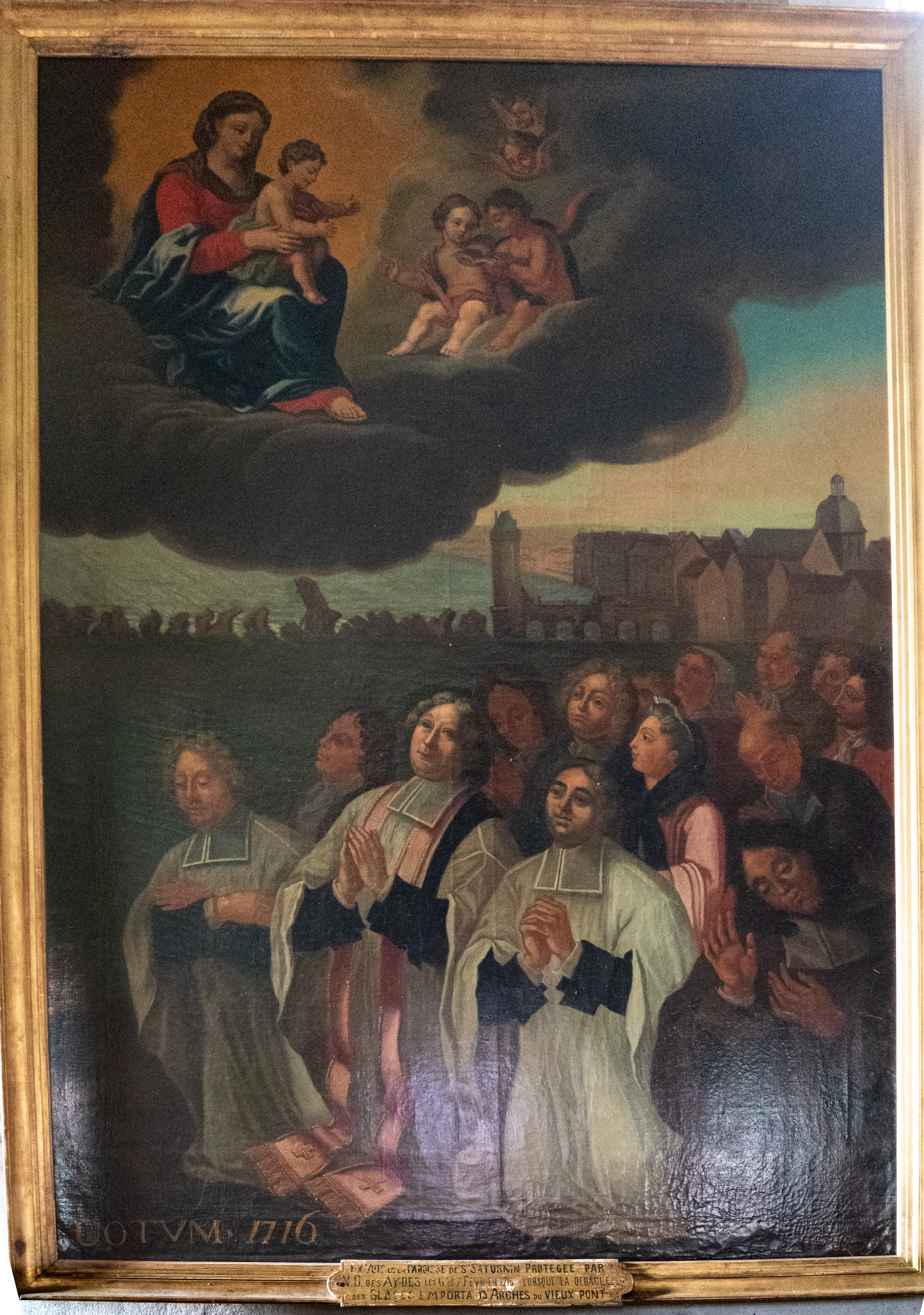
Ex-voto of the bridge destruction

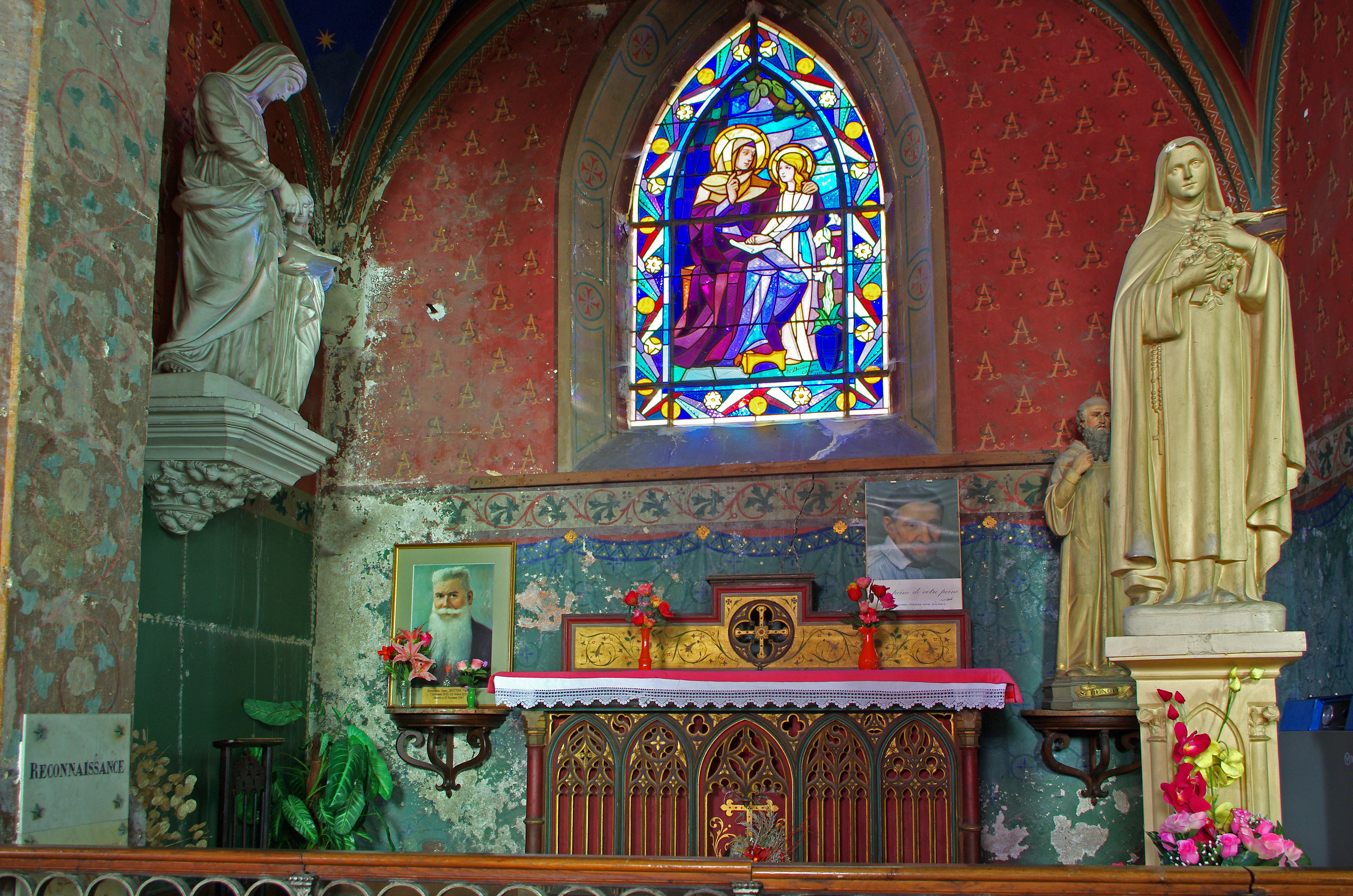
St Anne chapel
