= La Creusille Harbor =

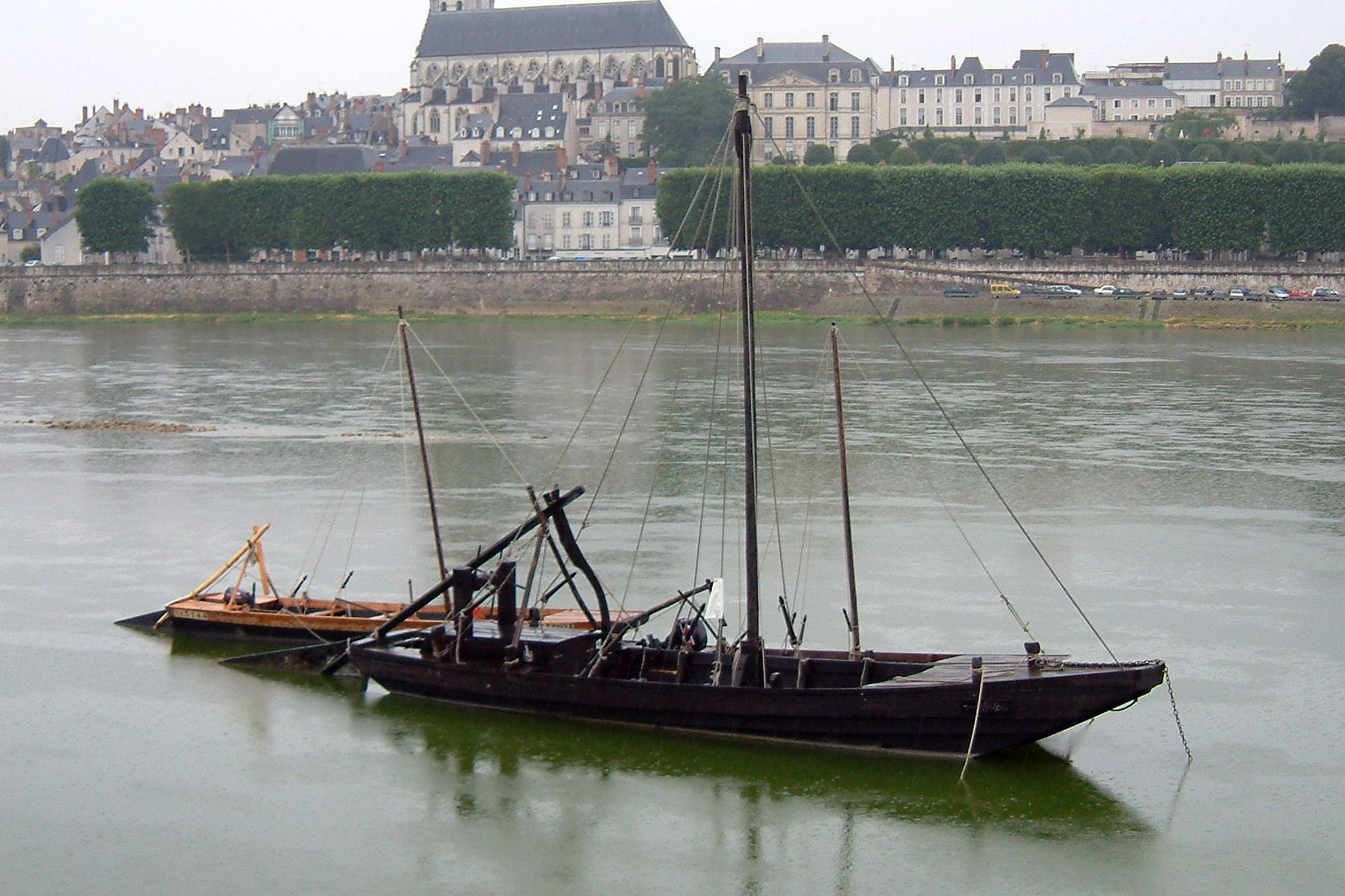
- Traditional boat of Blois
- Interactive map of La Creusille Harbor

Location
- Country: France
- Location: Centre-Val de Loire, Loir-et-Cher, Blois
- Coordinates: 47°35′13″N 1°20′42″E

Details
- Opened: 17st century

La Creusille is a harbor on the left bank of the Loire river, in the southern part of Blois, France.

== Meaning ==
The word Creusille (French pronunciation: [kʁøzij]) is an old local dialect term to designate the "hollow pilgrim's scallop" (« creuse coquille du pèlerin » in French). This refers to the shell of Saint James Christian pilgrims used to wear when going to Santiago de Compostela, Spain.

== History ==
Since the ancient times the Loire river has had the major axis in the region for transportation, and its stream bed made the Val de Loire agricultural. Due to its strategical situation, Blois is an obligatory passage for all pilgrims who follow the Way of St James through the Tours Route (on the Via Turonensis starting in Paris and passing through Tours). The flows of people and goods are thus constant, and justify the development of rudimentary strikes at several points of the banks of the river.

During the Middle Ages the river was rather different from today. Indeed, the medieval bridge was covered with houses, towers, and even a chapel. To feed five water mills, a 650m-long submersible dike was built in the middle of the river around the 9th century (at the latest).

Until 1606 both banks of the river were not parts of the same city, Blois. Indeed, the city was originally set up on the right bank. On the other side, this was actually a river island with a different manor that was under the Catholic Church's administration through St Saturnin parish. The island was named Insula Evenna, and the village standing there Vienne. As such, La Creusille has always been part of Vienne. Until this moment, Blois had its own harbor but it was abandoned after the addition of Vienne.

From the 17th century on, market gardening, river transport, fishing, tanning, and the hotel business flourished, and their growth exceeded the capacity of the shoreline. Thus, a lean port with two access ramps to the shore was developed.

After the fall of the medieval bridge in 1716, the port was reinforced as part of the reconstructions of the Loire levees and the construction of the new Jacques-Gabriel Bridge. All the remaining water mills were destroyed, but the submersible dike was readjusted to divert the river's flow to the right bank and thus away from La Creusille, making it easier to moor boats. In 1717, a dike was built in the extension of the harbor and towards the East: the operation dried up the La Bouillie river channel and thus linked the former Evenna island to the left bank.

The arrival of the railroad in Blois in 1846 led the port to reinvent itself. Now that goods and people could reach Paris in a few hours (as opposed to several days by boat, the duration of which could vary according to direction, season, weather), La Creusille gradually became a shipyard.

At the same time, a new activity appeared in the 19th century: sand mining. Miners extracted sand and gravel directly from the steam bed of the Loire river, but the practice was sufficiently important to lower the water line, lower the alluvial water table, dry out wetlands and cause pike spawning grounds to disappear. Mining in Blois was therefore naturally abolished in 1995.

== Traditional boats ==
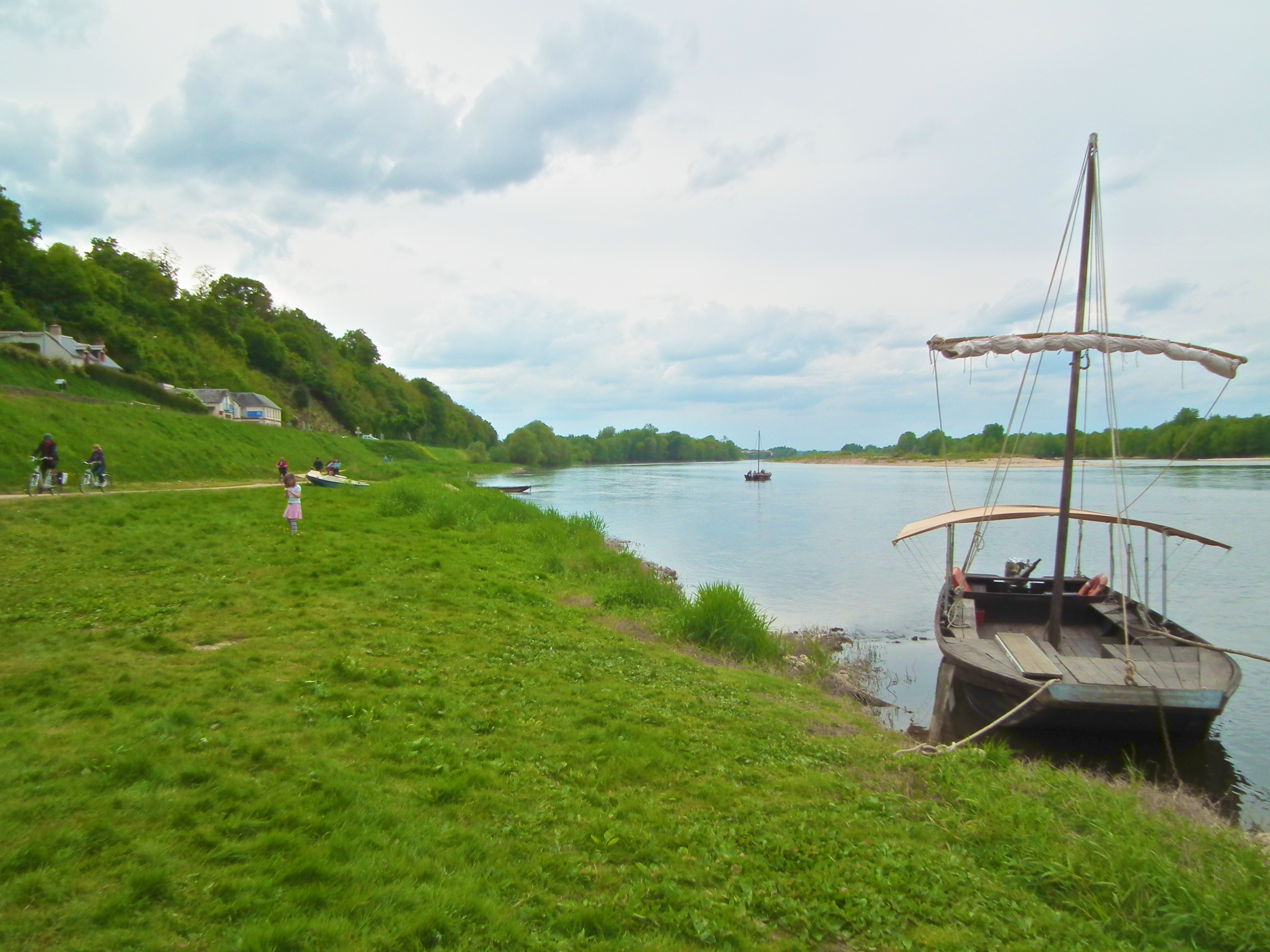
Scow in Chaumont-sur-Loire

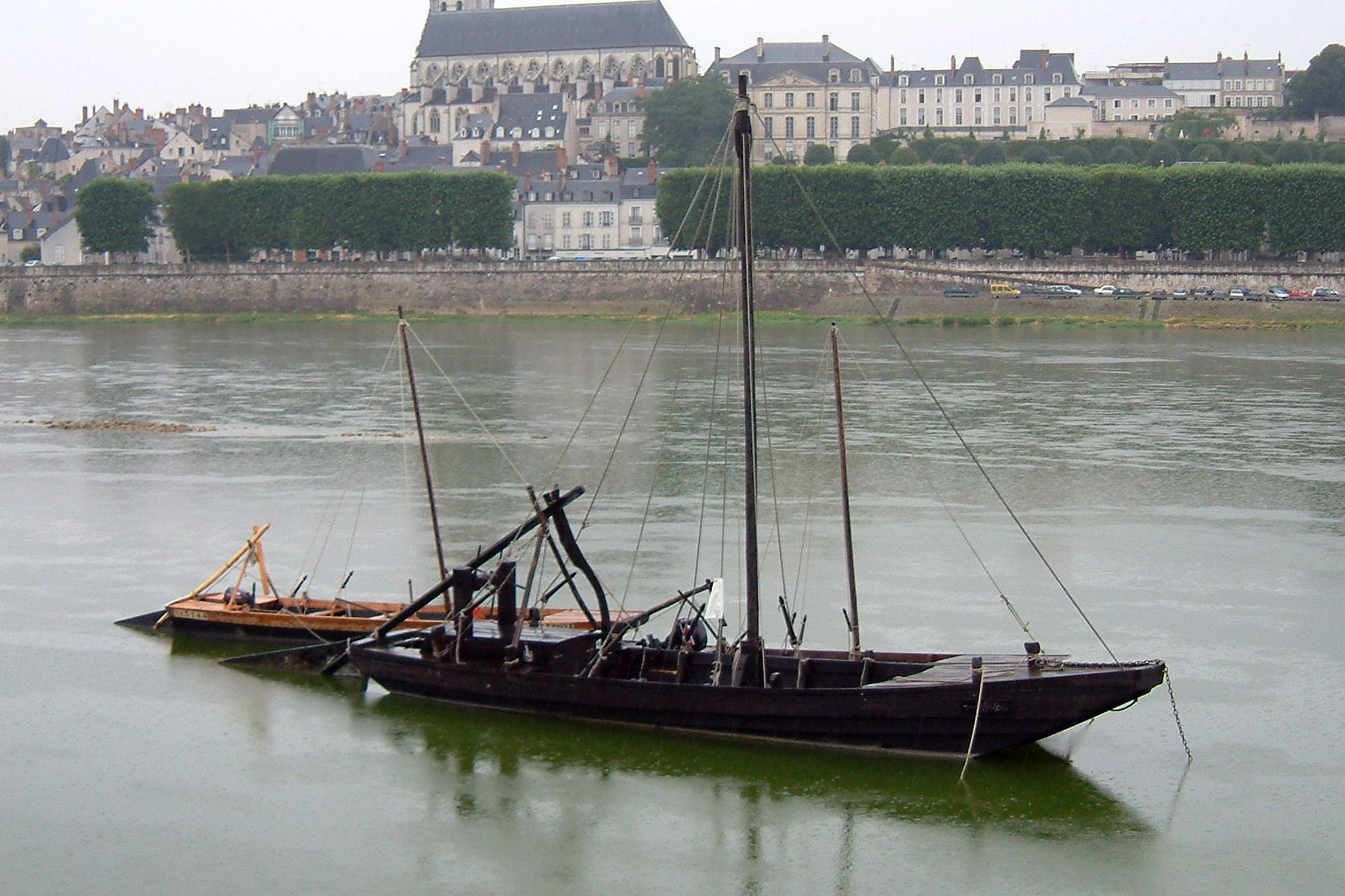
Fustereau in La Creusille Harbor

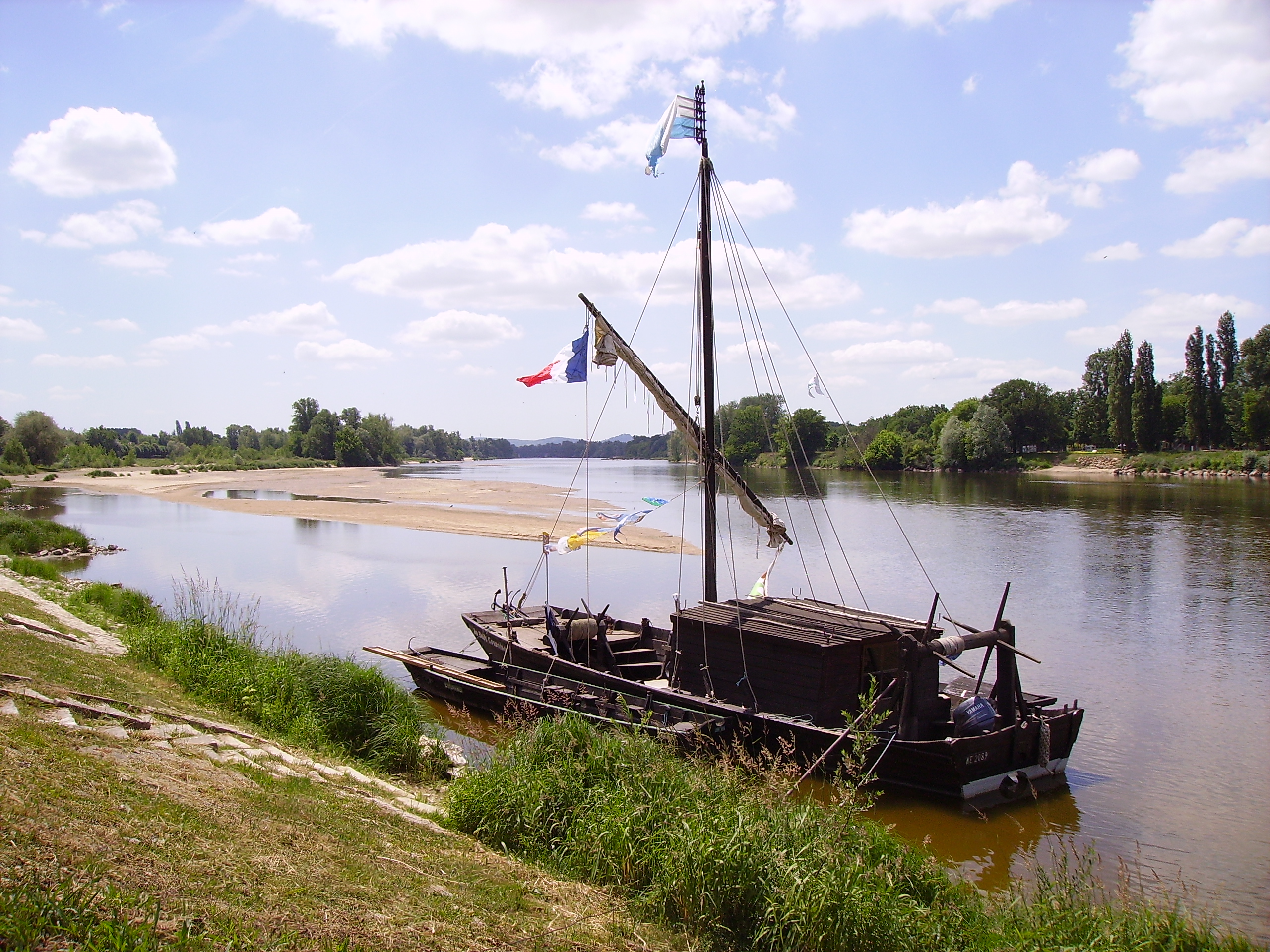
Cabanee toue in Cosne-Cours-sur-Loire

== Today's La Creusille ==
Since 2000 La Creusille is part of UNESCO's World Heritage sites in France.

Today the port has given way to an urban park on the left bank of the Loire river, complete with a leisure area. Accessible by car, the park has a parking area, a playground, picnic areas, a ping-pong table, a self-service library and a boulodrome, and provides free access to drinking water and electricity.

The park is on the route of La Loire à vélo and the European Rivers Route (EV6).

Since 2010 a guinguette animates the park in summer.

La Creusille also hosts the Loire Observatory, which offers traditional boat trips on the river.
