= Canton of Vineuil =

Coordinates: 47.58°N 1.38°E

The Canton of Vineuil (French: canton de Vineuil) is a canton in the French department of Loir-et-Cher, central France. Its borders were modified at the French canton reorganisation which came into effect in March 2015. Its seat is in Vineuil.

It consists of the following communes:

1. Blois (partly)
2. Cellettes
3. Cheverny
4. Chitenay
5. Cormeray
6. Cour-Cheverny
7. Saint-Gervais-la-Forêt
8. Vineuil
