= Fustereau =

A traditional small French boat

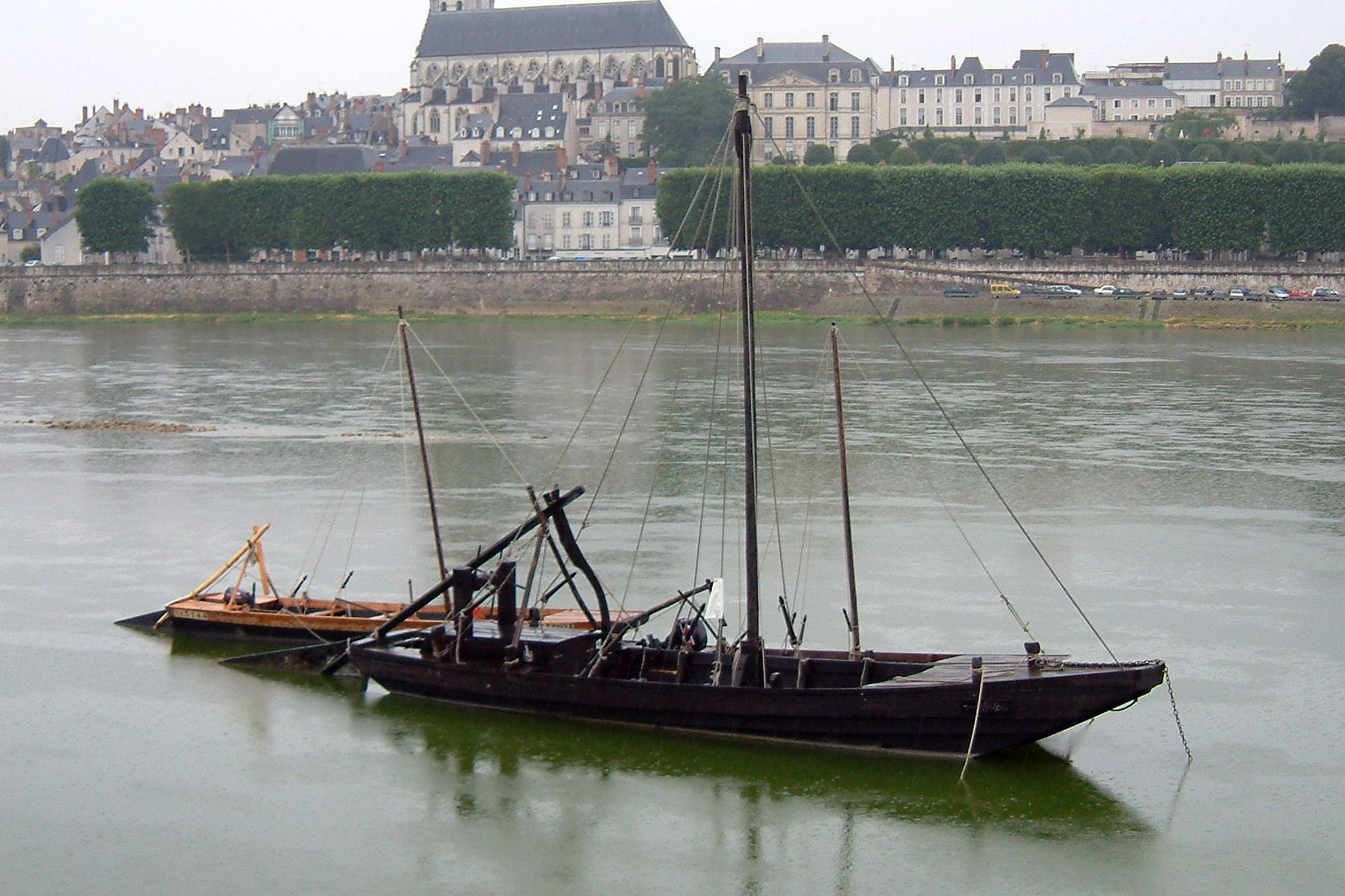
A fustereau in La Creusille Harbor, Blois.

A fustereau (or fûtreau as in current French) is a small light flat-bottomed boat traditional of the Loire Valley, in France.

This kind of boat can be equipped with a square sail or not (if so, just like weidlings on the Rhine river), depending on the wanted usage. Typically, fustereaus are around 10m-long.

Historically, such riverboats have been used by fishermen, travelers, and local inhabitants for a long time. Nowadays, they are still used for crossing from one bank to the other, or for tourism.
