= Chailles =

- Commune
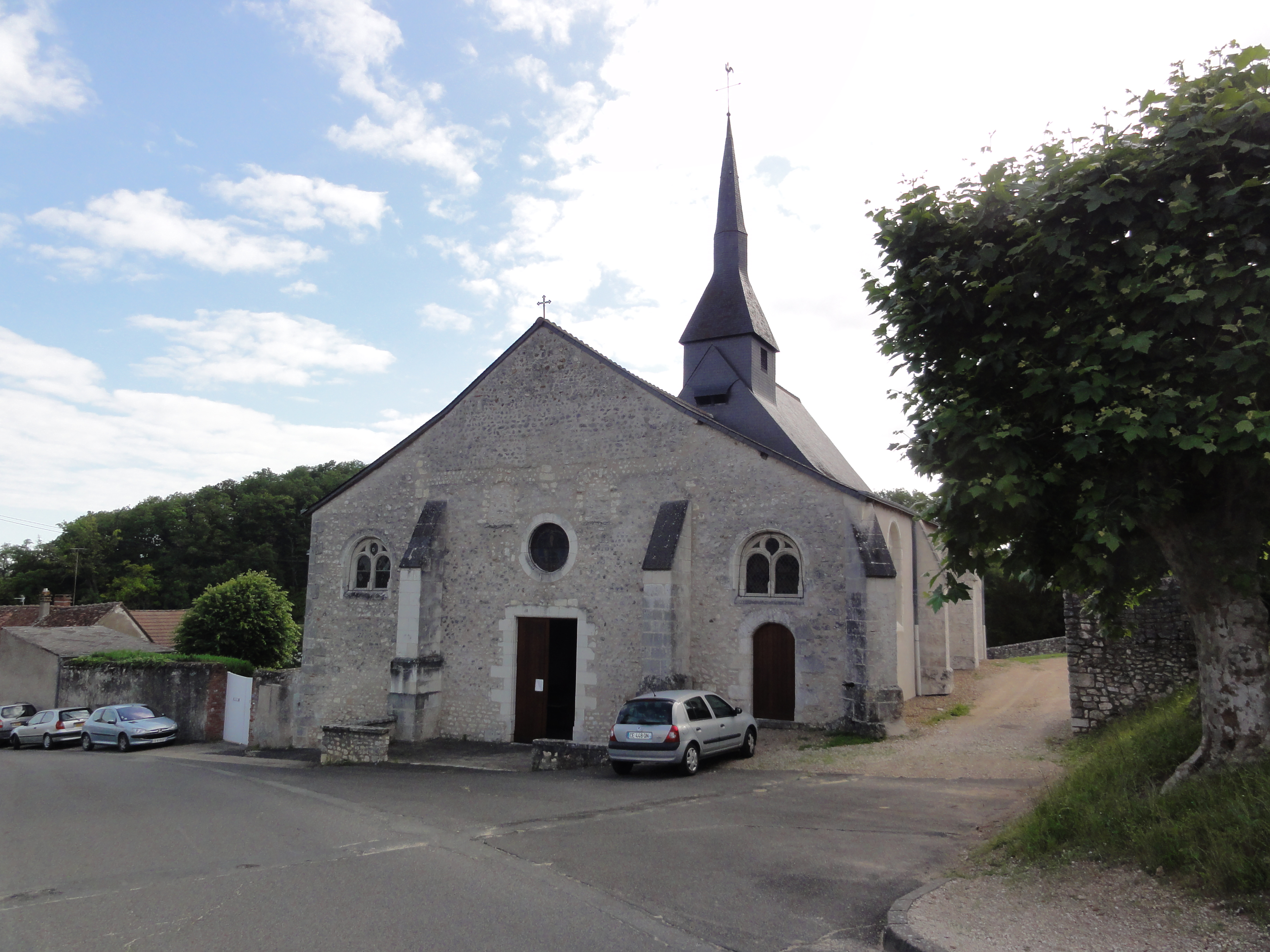
- Church of Saint-Martin

- Coat of arms
- Location of Chailles
- Location within France Location within Centre-Val de Loire
- Coordinates: 47°32′33″N 1°18′41″E
- Country: France
- Region: Centre-Val de Loire
- Department: Loir-et-Cher
- Arrondissement: Blois
- Canton: Blois-3
- Intercommunality: CA Blois Agglopolys

Government
  - Mayor (2022–2026): Florent Marmagne
- Area^{1}: 18.54 km^{2} (7.16 sq mi)
- Elevation: 91 m (299 ft)
- Highest elevation: 110 m (360 ft)
- Lowest elevation: 63 m (207 ft)
- Population (2023): 2,726
  - Density: 147.0/km^{2} (380.8/sq mi)
- Demonym: Chaillois.e
- Time zone: UTC+01:00 (CET)
  - Summer (DST): UTC+02:00 (CEST)
- INSEE/Postal code: 41032 /41120
- ^{1} French Land Register data, which excludes lakes, ponds, glaciers > 1 km^{2} (0.386 sq mi or 247 acres) and river estuaries.

Chailles (French pronunciation: [ʃɑj], [ʃaj]) is a commune in the Loir-et-Cher department, in the region of Centre-Val de Loire, France.

== Population ==
Historical population

Year	Pop.	±% p.a.
1793	609	—
1821	770	+0.84%
1846	924	+0.73%
1872	959	+0.14%
1901	829	−0.50%
1926	703	−0.66%
1946	671	−0.23%
1962	769	+0.86%
1968	1,014	+4.72%

Year	Pop.	±% p.a.
1975	1,249	+3.02%
1982	1,556	+3.19%
1990	1,602	+0.36%
1999	2,019	+2.60%
2007	2,427	+2.33%
2012	2,562	+1.09%
2017	2,680	+0.90%
2023	2,726	+0.28%

Source: EHESS and INSEE (1968-2023)

== See also ==
- Communes of the Loir-et-Cher department
