= Cheverny =

- Commune
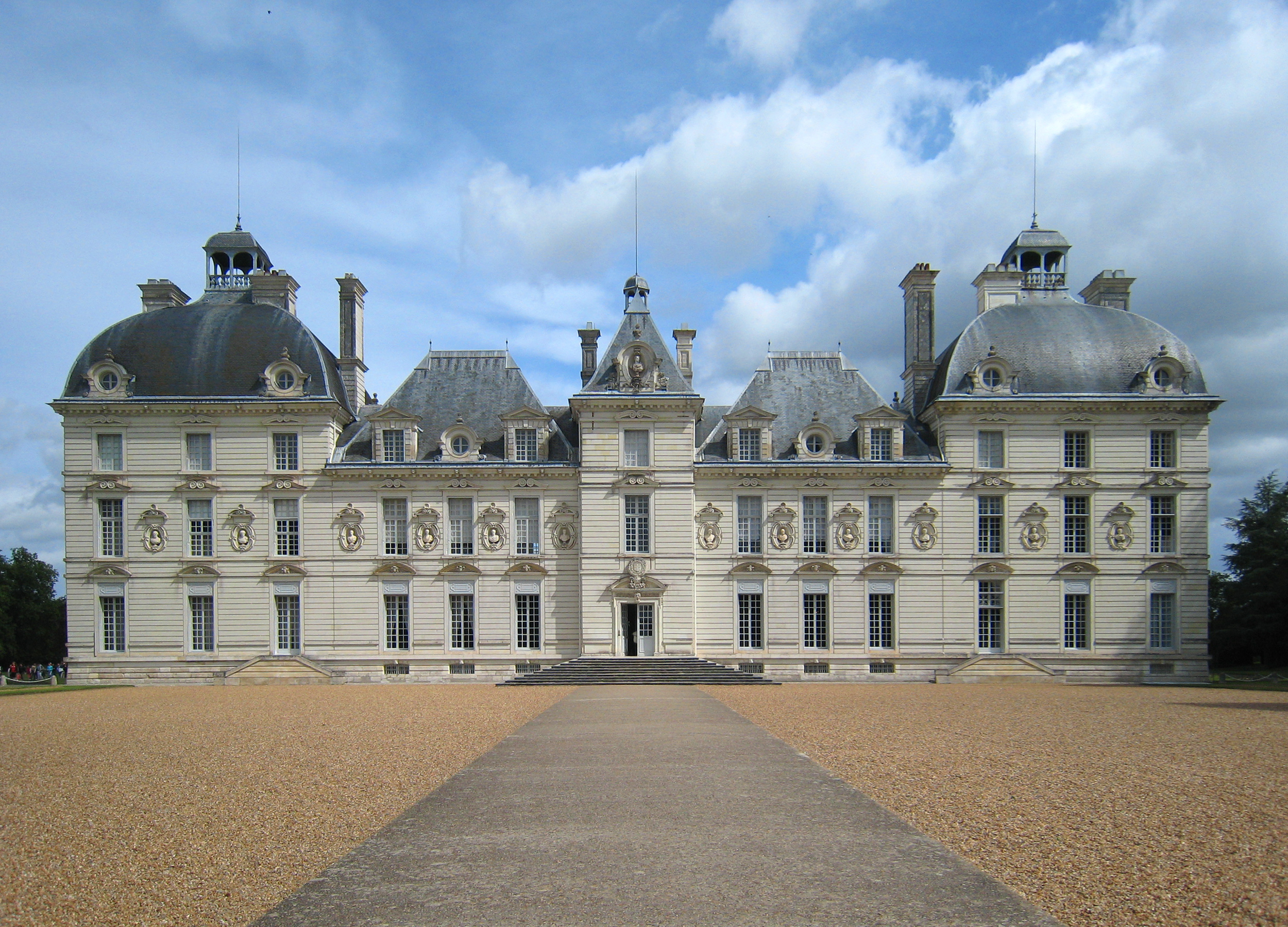
- Château de Cheverny

- Coat of arms
- Location of Cheverny
- Location within France Location within Centre-Val de Loire
- Coordinates: 47°30′00″N 1°27′40″E
- Country: France
- Region: Centre-Val de Loire
- Department: Loir-et-Cher
- Arrondissement: Blois
- Canton: Vineuil
- Intercommunality: CA Blois Agglopolys

Government
  - Mayor (2020–2026): Lionella Gallard
- Area^{1}: 33 km^{2} (13 sq mi)
- Elevation: 85 m (279 ft)
- Highest elevation: 116 m (381 ft)
- Lowest elevation: 78 m (256 ft)
- Population (2023): 910
  - Density: 28/km^{2} (71/sq mi)
- Time zone: UTC+01:00 (CET)
  - Summer (DST): UTC+02:00 (CEST)
- INSEE/Postal code: 41050 /41700
- ^{1} French Land Register data, which excludes lakes, ponds, glaciers > 1 km^{2} (0.386 sq mi or 247 acres) and river estuaries.

Cheverny (French pronunciation: [ʃəvɛʁni]) is a commune in the French department of Loir-et-Cher, administrative region of Centre-Val de Loire.

It lies in the Loire Valley, about 10 km (6.2 mi) southeast of Blois.

== Population ==
Historical population
Year	Pop.	±% p.a.
1968	743	—
1975	715	−0.55%
1982	842	+2.36%
1990	900	+0.84%
1999	986	+1.02%
2007	942	−0.57%
2012	975	+0.69%
2017	956	−0.39%
2023	910	−0.82%
Source: INSEE

== Sights ==
The commune is the site of the Château de Cheverny, used by the Belgian comic book creator Hergé as a model for his fictional "Château de Moulinsart" (Marlinspike Hall in English) in the Adventures of Tintin books.

== See also ==
- Communes of the Loir-et-Cher department
