= Vineuil, Loir-et-Cher =

Vineuil
- Commune
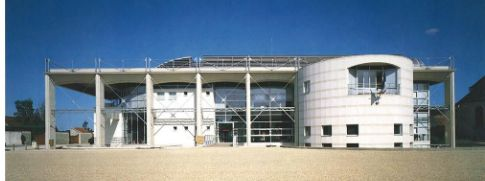
- Town hall

- Coat of arms
- Location of Vineuil
- Location within France Location within Centre-Val de Loire
- Coordinates: 47°34′53″N 1°22′24″E
- Country: France
- Region: Centre-Val de Loire
- Department: Loir-et-Cher
- Arrondissement: Blois
- Canton: Vineuil
- Intercommunality: CA Blois Agglopolys

Government
  - Mayor (2020–2026): François Fromet
- Area^{1}: 22.34 km^{2} (8.63 sq mi)
- Elevation: 84 m (276 ft)
- Highest elevation: 100 m (330 ft)
- Lowest elevation: 68 m (223 ft)
- Population (2023): 8,064
  - Density: 361.0/km^{2} (934.9/sq mi)
- Demonym: Vinolien.ne
- Time zone: UTC+01:00 (CET)
  - Summer (DST): UTC+02:00 (CEST)
- INSEE/Postal code: 41295 /41350
- ^{1} French Land Register data, which excludes lakes, ponds, glaciers > 1 km^{2} (0.386 sq mi or 247 acres) and river estuaries.

Vineuil (French pronunciation: [vinœj]) is a commune neighboring the city of Blois, in the French department of Loir-et-Cher, Centre-Val de Loire.

== Economy ==
Vineuil is an economical and industrial center of the vicinity of Blois. Specialized mainly in tertiary industries, it is home to five industrial zones and shopping centers such as Auchan.

== Places ==
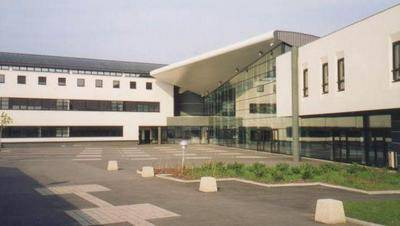
Marcel Carné Secondary School in 2008

- Marcel Carné Secondary School (collège Marcel Carné)
- Notre Dame de Vineuil Elementary and Secondary School (école et collège Notre-Dame de Vineuil)
- Les Noëls
- Les Girards
- Blois Valley

== Geography ==
The commune is traversed by the river Cosson.

== Population ==
Historical population

Year	Pop.	±% p.a.
1793	1,853	—
1800	2,000	+1.10%
1806	1,991	−0.08%
1821	2,083	+0.30%
1831	2,055	−0.14%
1836	2,039	−0.16%
1841	2,138	+0.95%
1846	2,215	+0.71%
1851	2,188	−0.24%
1856	2,138	−0.46%
1861	2,067	−0.67%
1866	2,060	−0.07%
1872	1,911	−1.24%
1876	1,841	−0.93%
1881	1,930	+0.95%
1886	1,845	−0.90%
1891	1,830	−0.16%
1896	1,866	+0.39%
1901	1,852	−0.15%

Year	Pop.	±% p.a.
1906	1,944	+0.97%
1911	1,896	−0.50%
1921	1,821	−0.40%
1926	1,769	−0.58%
1931	1,758	−0.12%
1936	1,810	+0.58%
1946	1,958	+0.79%
1954	2,097	+0.86%
1962	2,659	+3.01%
1968	3,466	+4.52%
1975	4,393	+3.44%
1982	5,263	+2.61%
1990	6,253	+2.18%
1999	6,651	+0.69%
2007	7,013	+0.66%
2012	7,443	+1.20%
2017	7,815	+0.98%
2023	8,064	+0.52%

Source: EHESS and INSEE (1968-2023)

== See also ==
- Communes of the Loir-et-Cher department
