= Saint-Gervais-la-Forêt =

- Commune
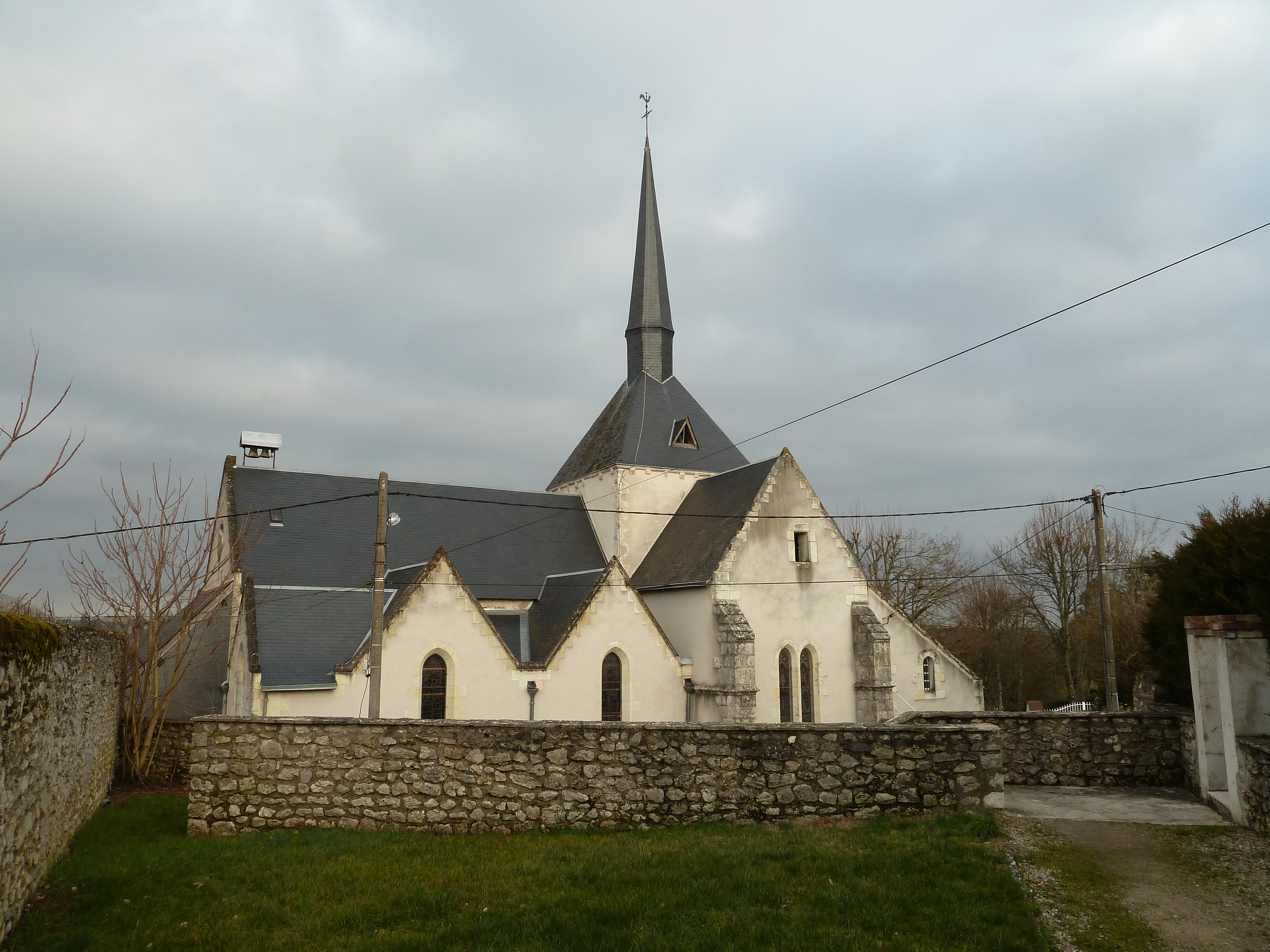

- Coat of arms
- Location of Saint-Gervais-la-Forêt
- Location within France Location within Centre-Val de Loire
- Coordinates: 47°34′11″N 1°21′39″E
- Country: France
- Region: Centre-Val de Loire
- Department: Loir-et-Cher
- Arrondissement: Blois
- Canton: Vineuil
- Intercommunality: CA Blois Agglopolys

Government
  - Mayor (2020–2026): Jean-Noël Chappuis
- Area^{1}: 8.97 km^{2} (3.46 sq mi)
- Elevation: 90 m (300 ft)
- Highest elevation: 110 m (360 ft)
- Lowest elevation: 67 m (220 ft)
- Population (2023): 3,180
  - Density: 355/km^{2} (918/sq mi)
- Demonym(s): Gervaisien, Gervaisienne
- Time zone: UTC+01:00 (CET)
  - Summer (DST): UTC+02:00 (CEST)
- INSEE/Postal code: 41212 /41350
- ^{1} French Land Register data, which excludes lakes, ponds, glaciers > 1 km^{2} (0.386 sq mi or 247 acres) and river estuaries.

Saint-Gervais-la-Forêt (pronounced [sɛ̃ ʒɛʁve la fɔʁɛ], [sɛ̃ ʒɛʁvɛ]), commonly known as Saint-Gervais, is a commune in the French department of Loir-et-Cher, administrative region of Centre-Val de Loire.

== Population ==
Historical population

Year	Pop.	±% p.a.
1793	333	—
1831	362	+0.22%
1846	480	+1.90%
1872	525	+0.35%
1901	606	+0.50%
1926	568	−0.26%
1946	760	+1.47%
1962	1,426	+4.01%
1968	1,775	+3.72%

Year	Pop.	±% p.a.
1975	2,042	+2.02%
1982	2,702	+4.08%
1990	2,784	+0.37%
1999	3,308	+1.93%
2007	3,433	+0.46%
2012	3,303	−0.77%
2017	3,201	−0.63%
2023	3,180	−0.11%

Source: EHESS and INSEE (1968–2023)

== See also ==
- Communes of the Loir-et-Cher department
