= Jacques-Gabriel Bridge =

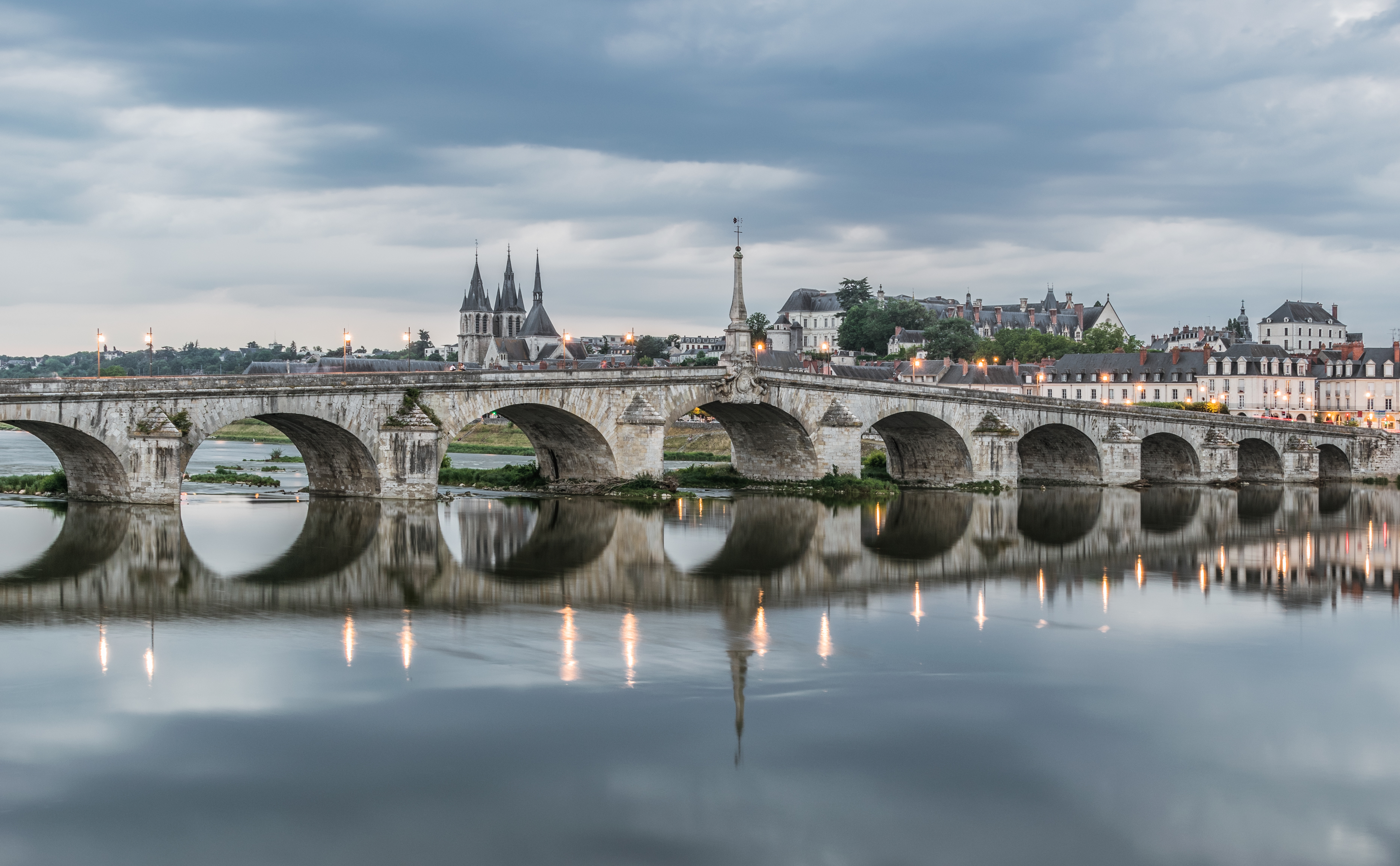
- Coordinates: 47°35′07″N 01°20′15″E
- Crosses: Loire river
- Locale: Blois, France

Characteristics
- Design: Pointed arch bridge
- Total length: 928 ft (283 m)
- Width: 49 ft (15 m)

History
- Construction start: 1717
- Construction end: 1724

Location
- Interactive map of Jacques-Gabriel Bridge

The Jacques-Gabriel Bridge (named pont Jacques-Gabriel in French) spans the Loire river in Blois, France, since the beginning of the 18th century. With a total length of 283m, it is made up of 11 arches, and is now the last humpback bridge on the river that is pointed. Since its construction, the bridge retains the name of the architect who designed it, Jacques Gabriel. The bridge was partially destroyed three times: in 1870 (Franco-Prussian War), 1940 and 1944 (World War II). It is now crossed by National Route 156.

The bridge was listed as a historical monument by order of 22 April 1937.

== Location ==
The bridge spans the Loire river in the middle of Blois, between the downtown (from the same axis of the Denis-Papin staircase) and Vienne on the left bank (aligned to Wilson Avenue).

== History ==
=== Construction of a new Bloisian bridge ===
Since the 11th century, a stone bridge was used to link both banks. In the night between 6 and 7 February 1716, this medieval bridge collapsed.

The construction of a new bridge is decided by August 1716. The project management is given by Duke Philippe of Orléans to Jacques Gabriel, yet King Louis XVI's official architect. As early as the end of that year, a regiment from Piedmont was called to build the bridge. The infrastructure was inaugurated on 4 May 1724, with a 14.6m-high obelisk standing in its middle.

== Pictures ==
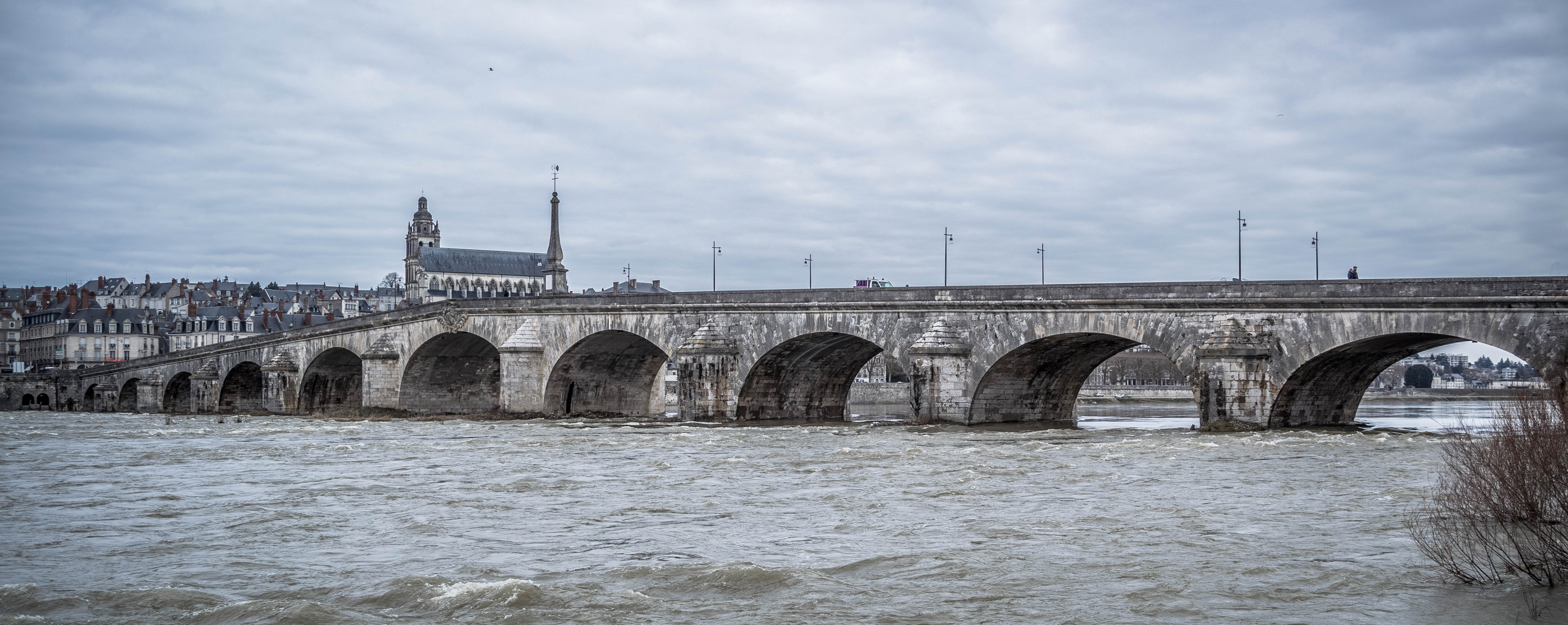
Jacques-Gabriel Bridge during the 2016 floodings

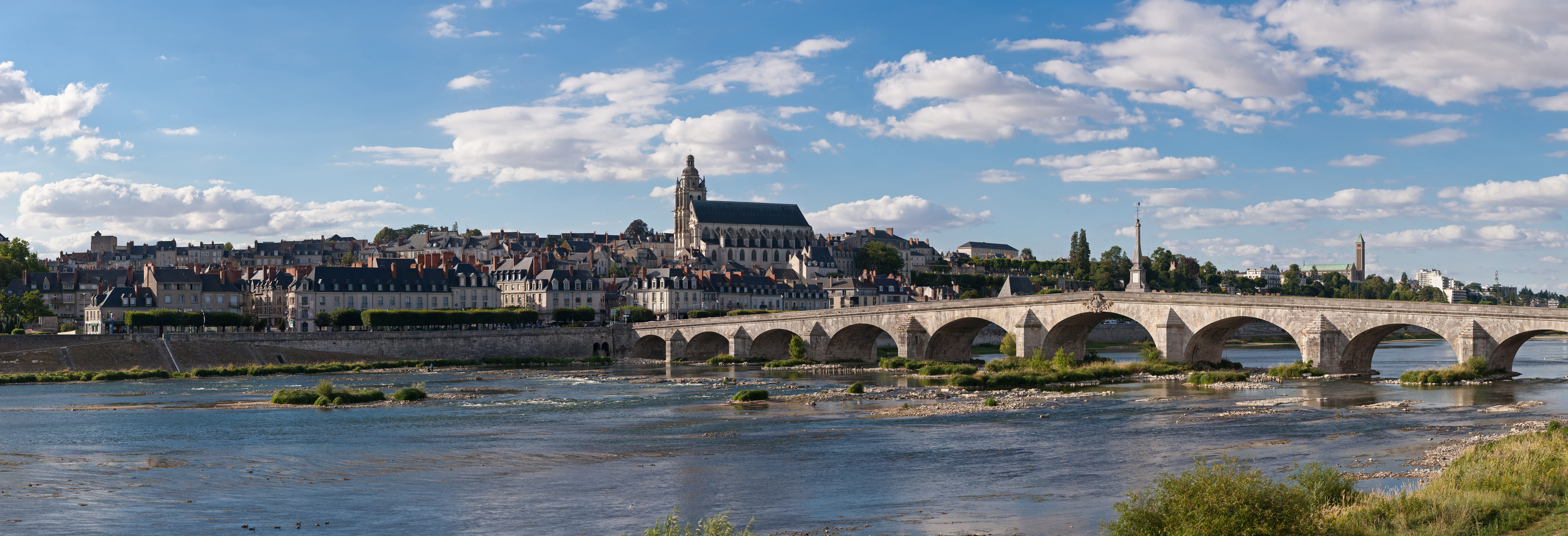
Panorama on the downtown of Blois with the bridge
