= List of châteaux in Centre-Val de Loire =

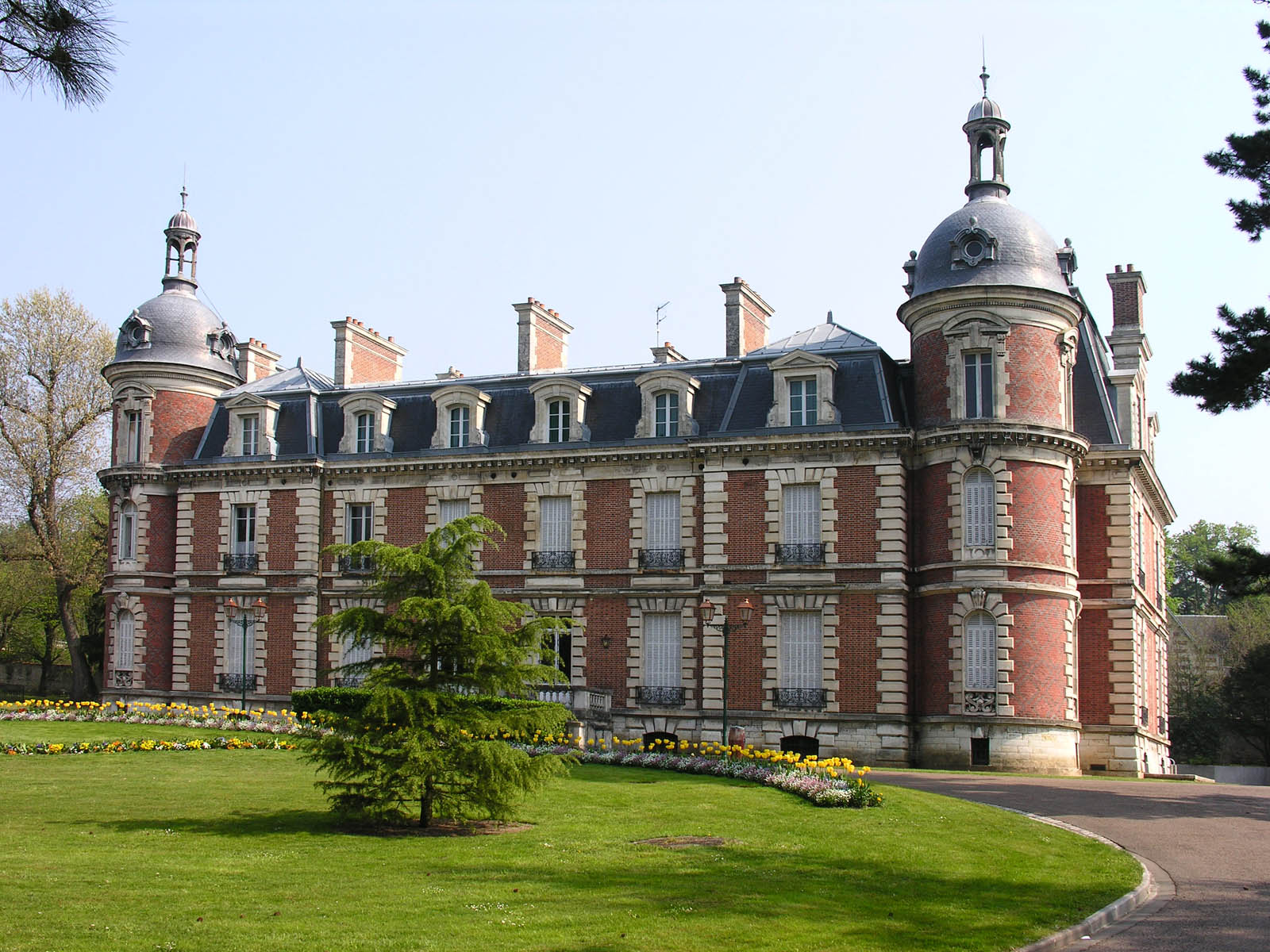
Château de Trousse-Barrière

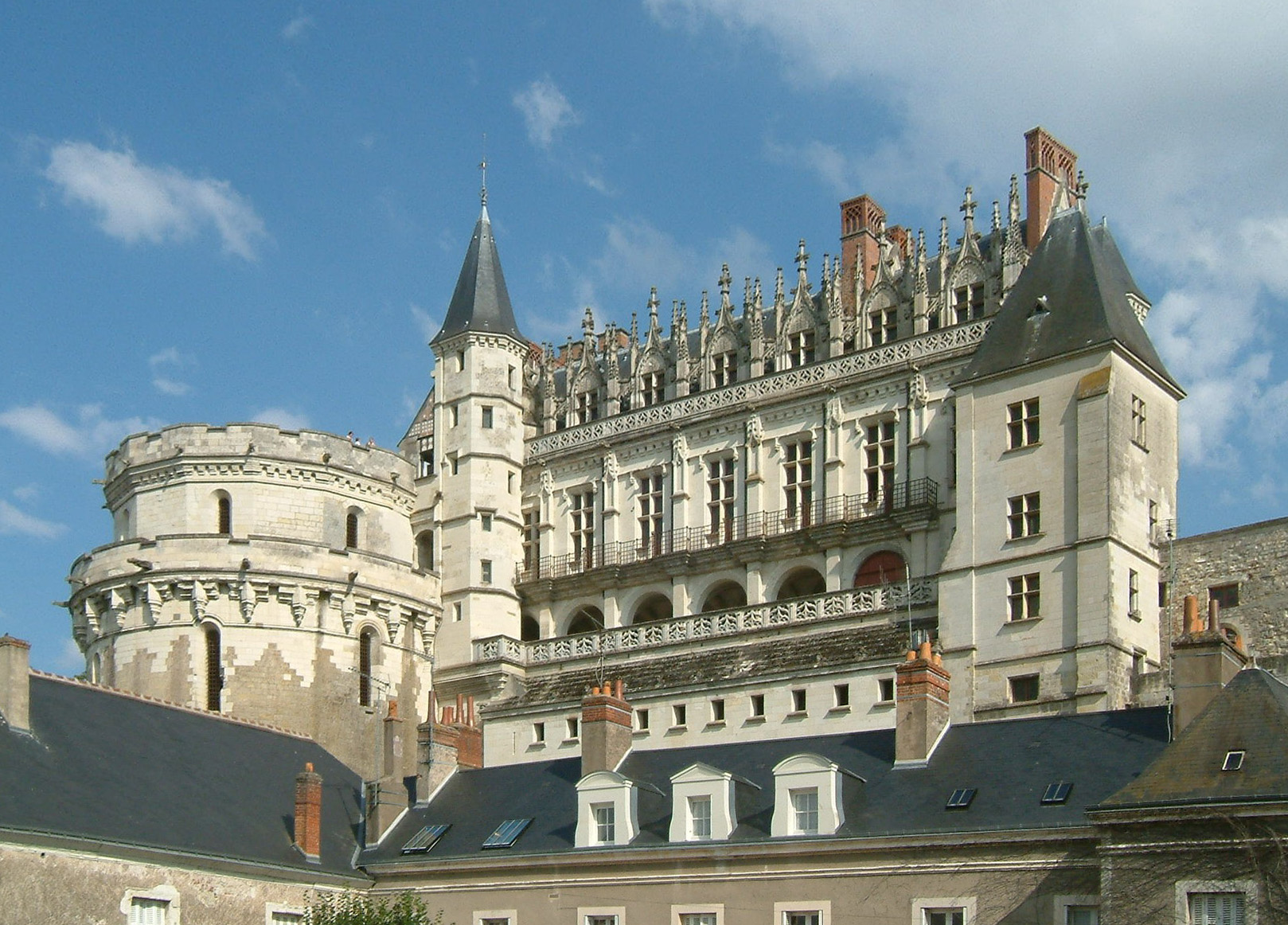
Château d'Amboise

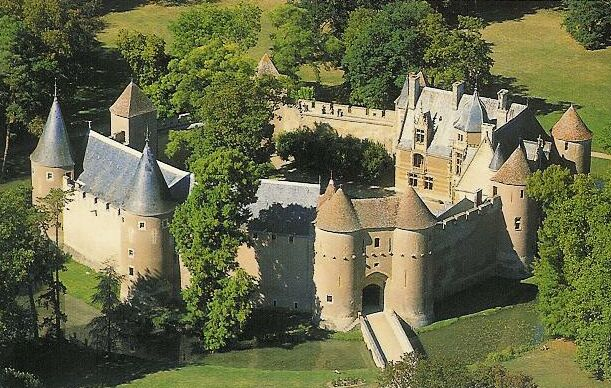
Château d'Ainay-le-Vieil

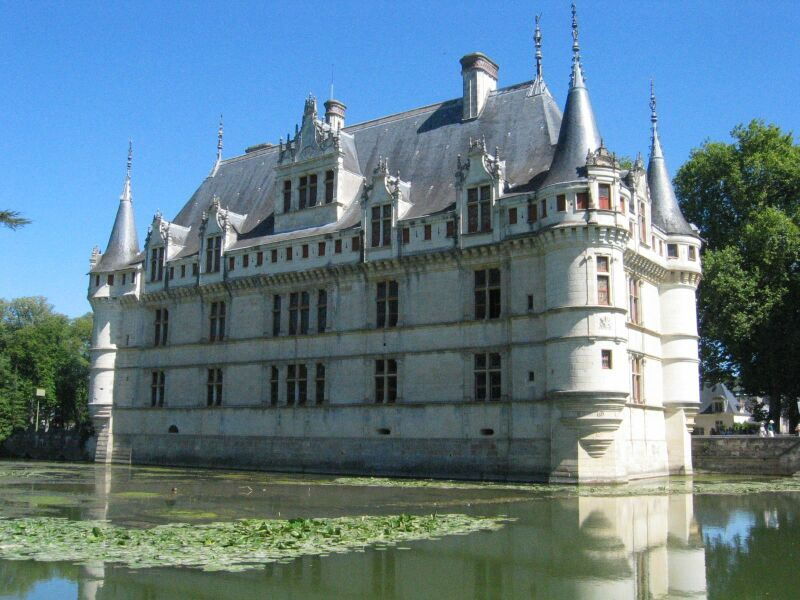
Château d'Azay-le-Rideau

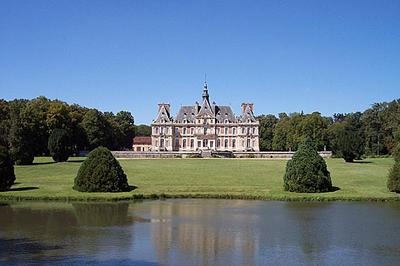
Château de Baronville

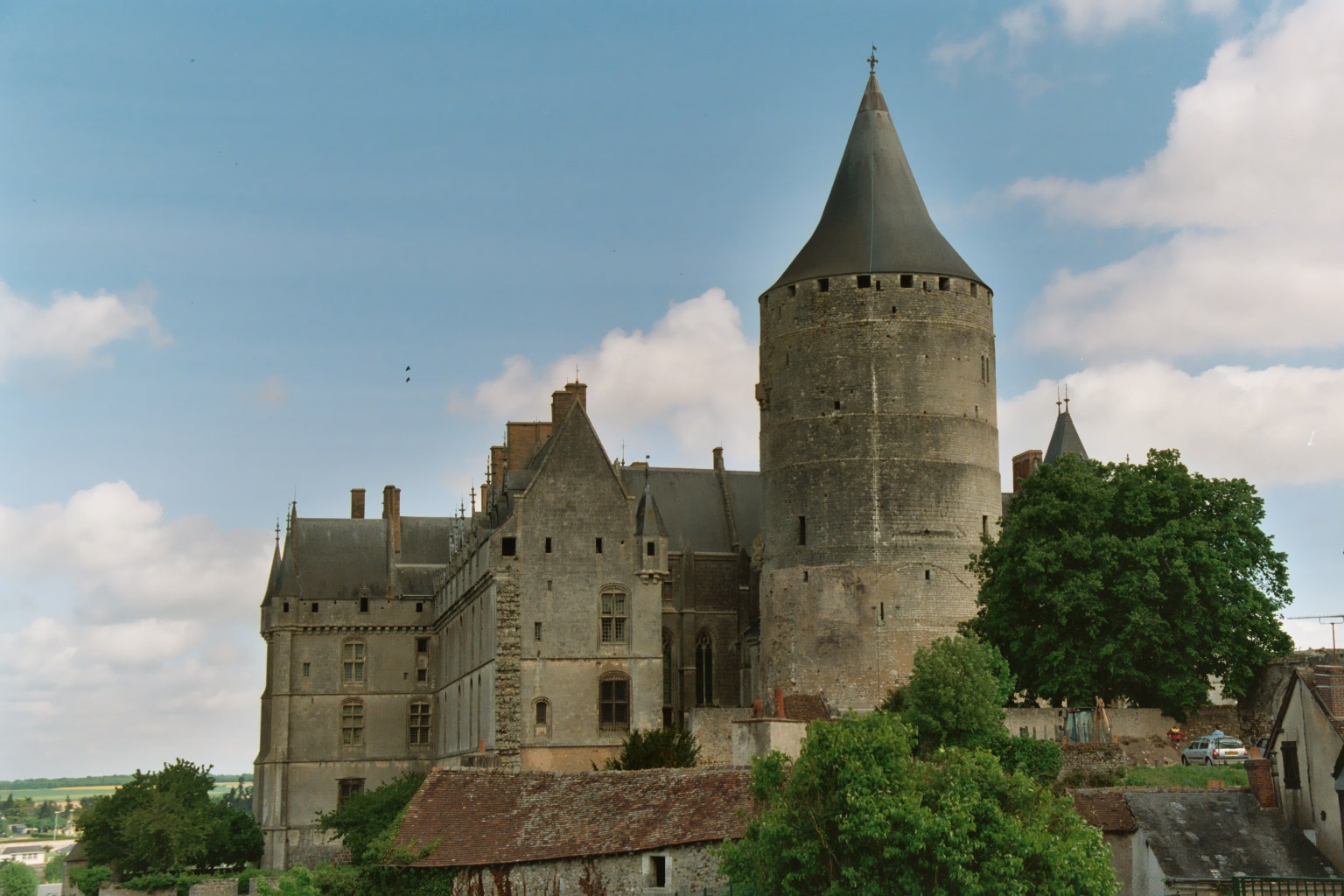
Château de Châteaudun

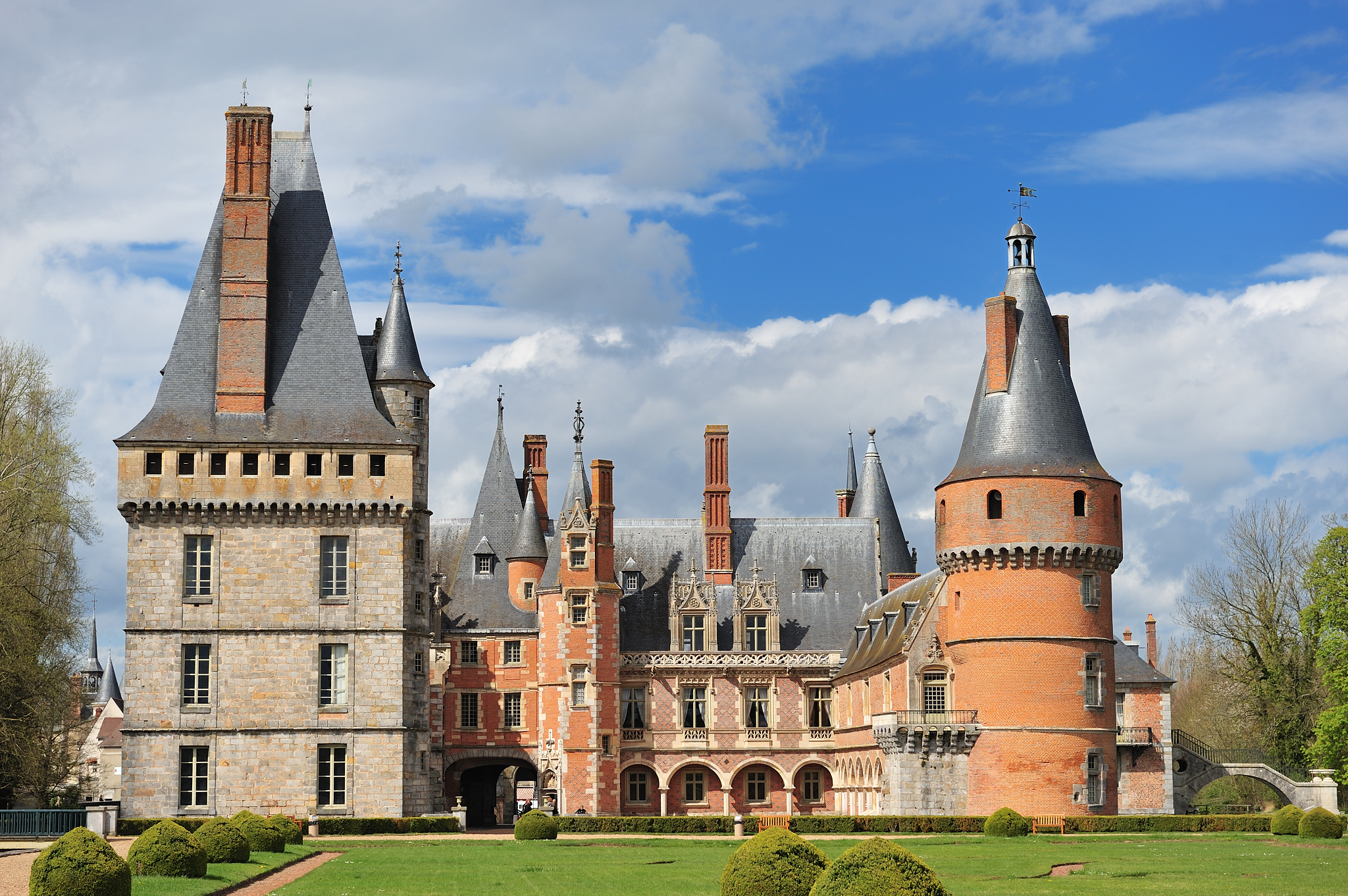
Château de Maintenon

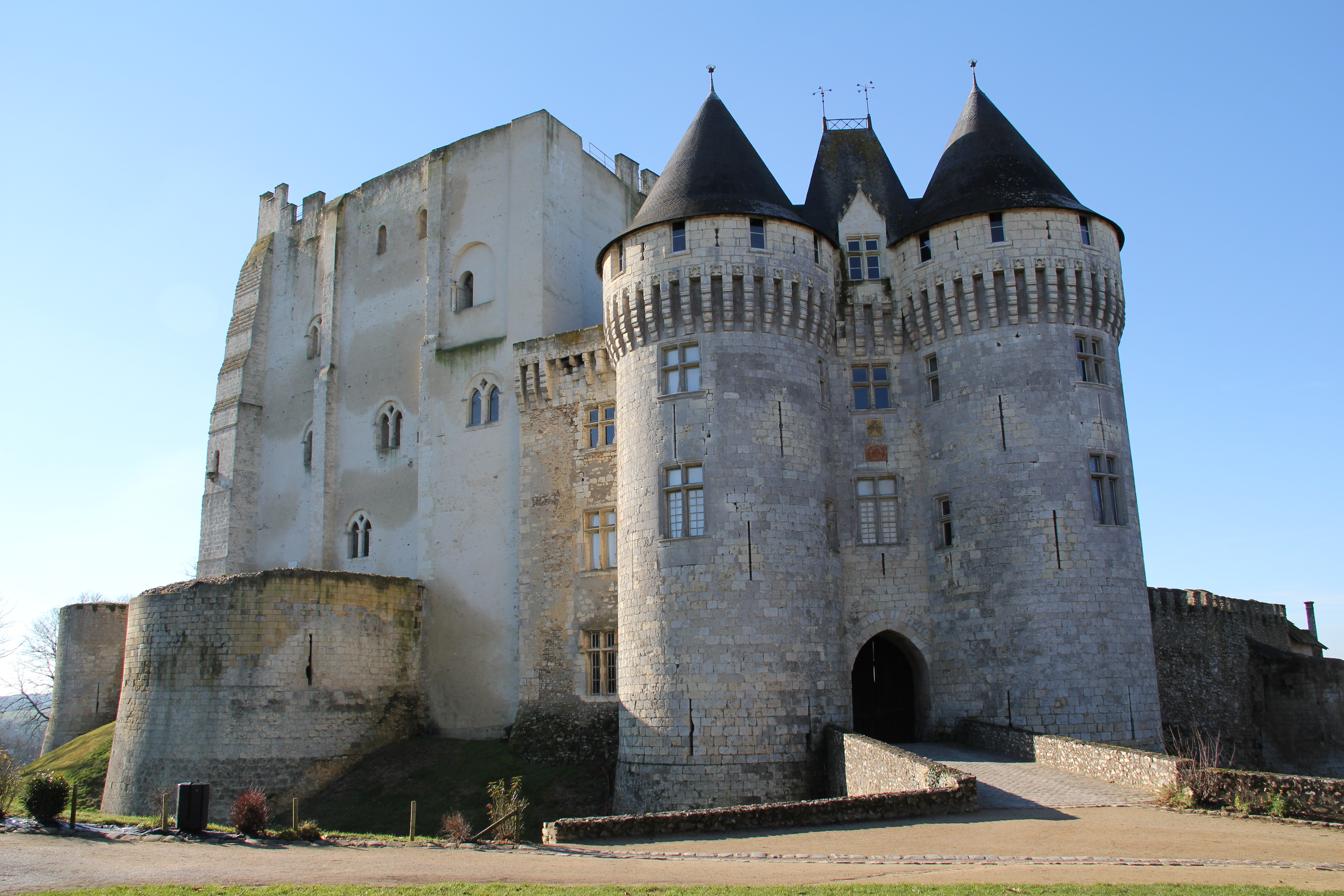
Château Saint-Jean in Nogent-le-Rotrou

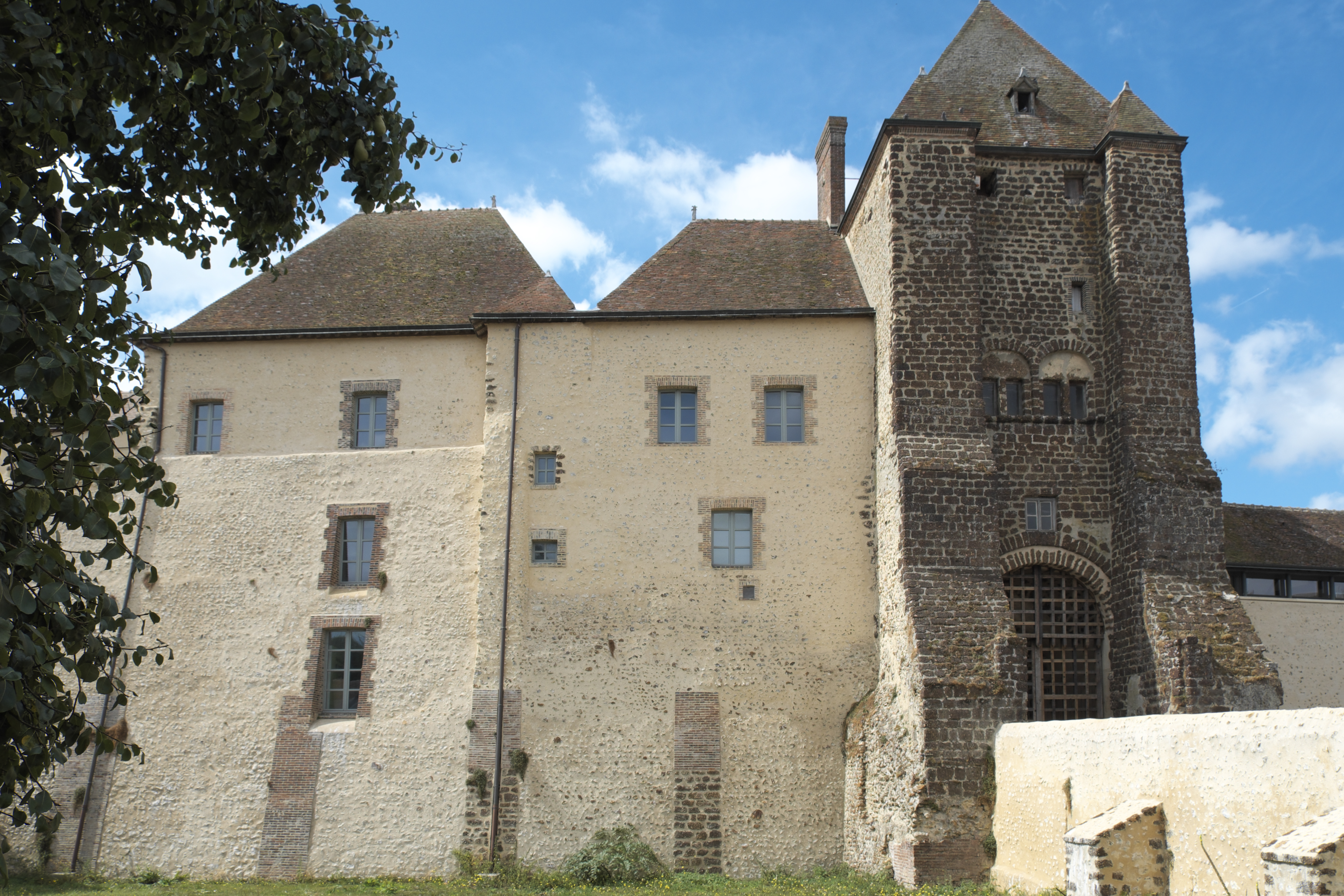
Château de Senonches

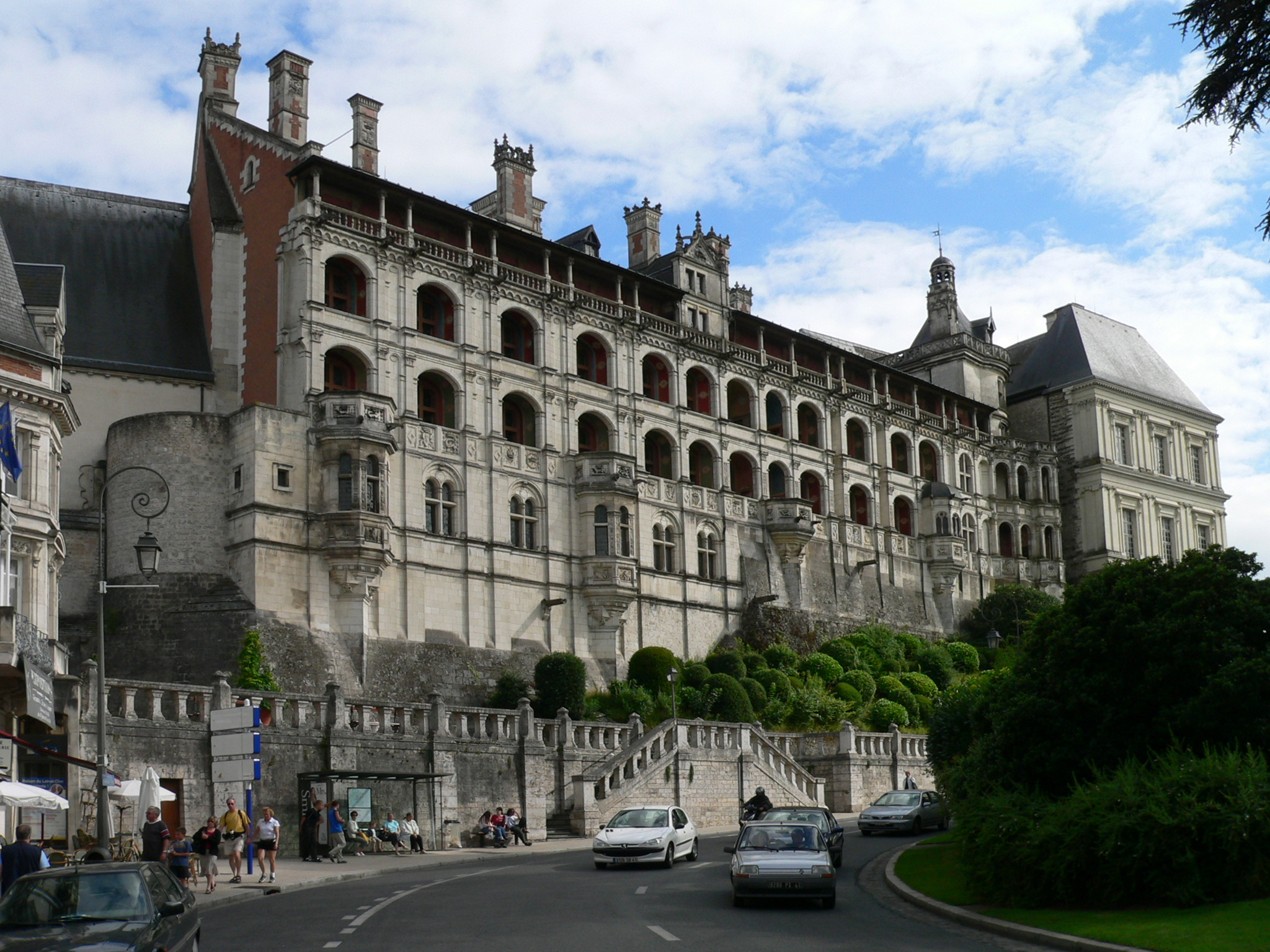
Château de Blois

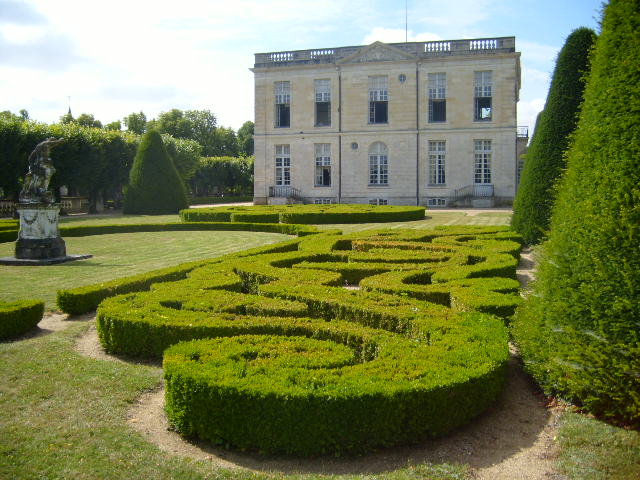
Château de Bouges

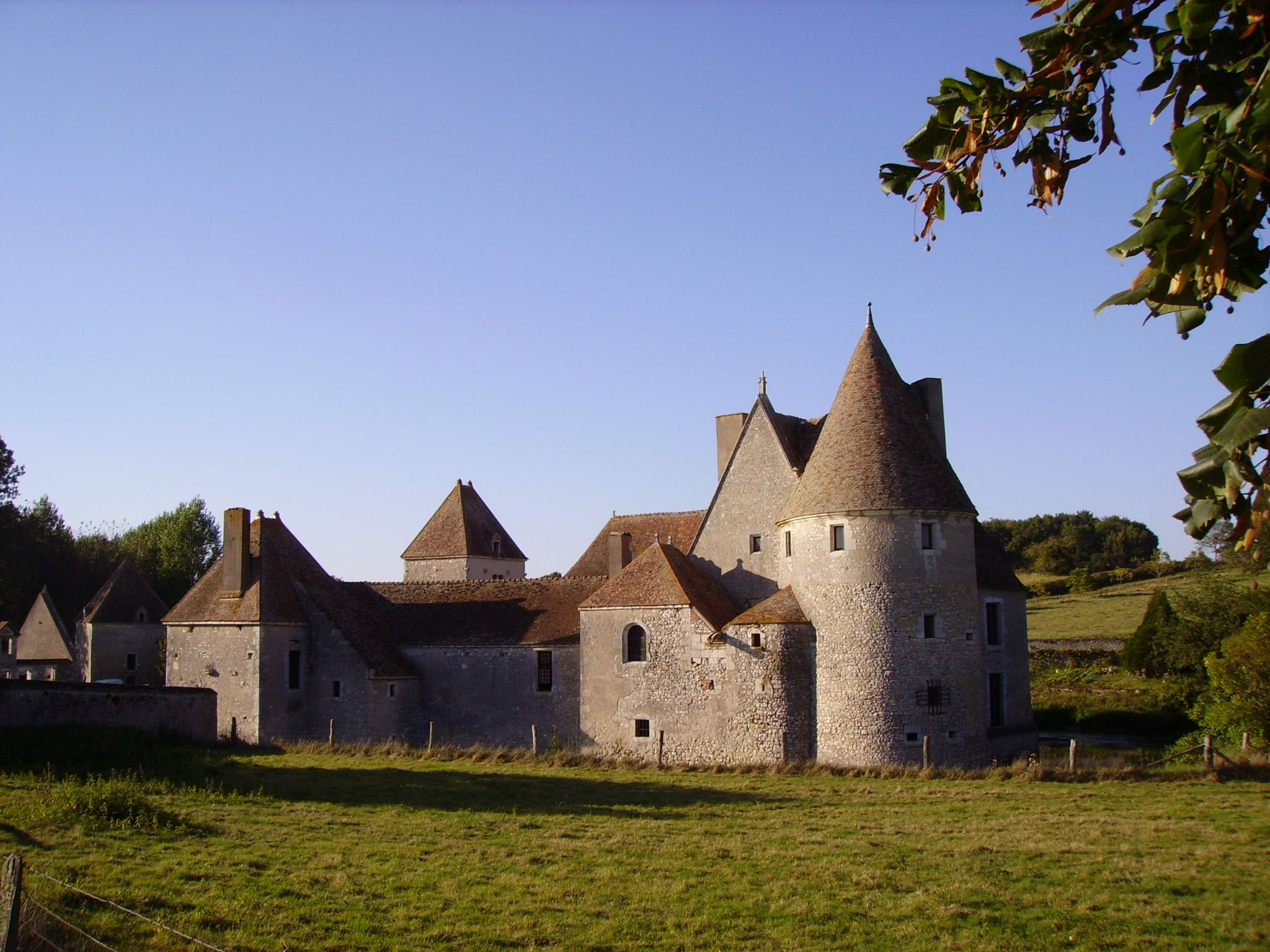
Château de Buranlure

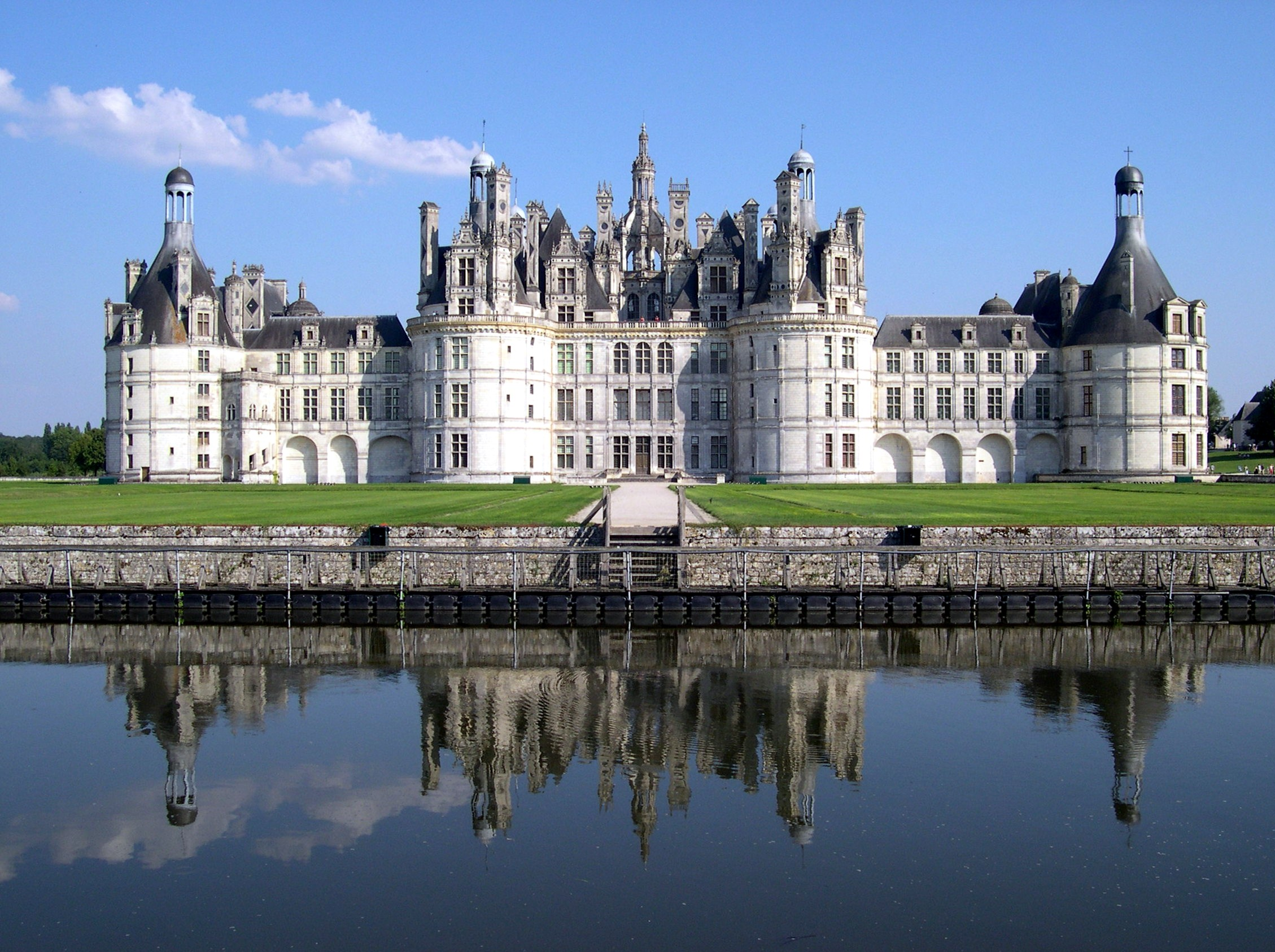
Château de Chambord

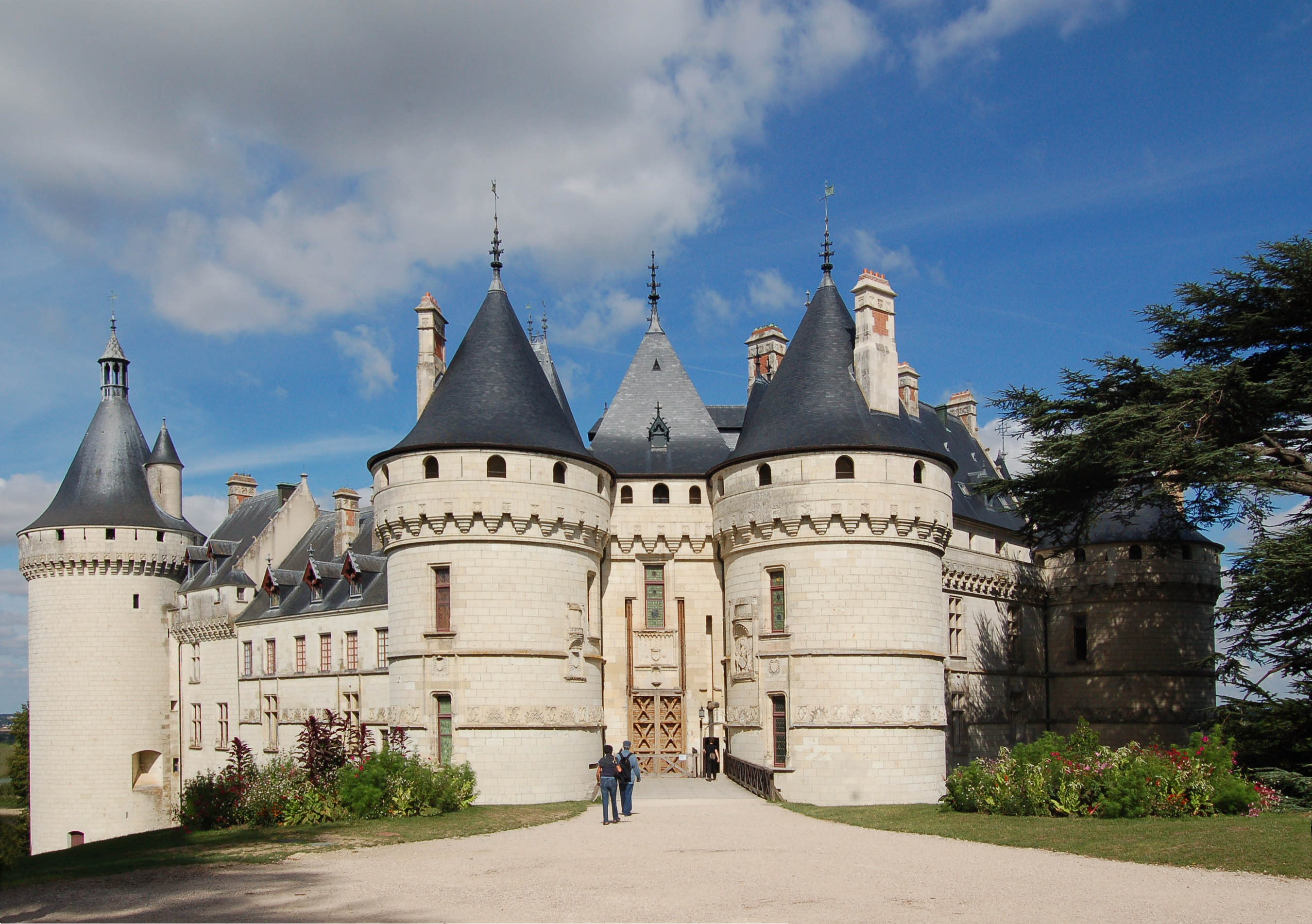
Château de Chaumont-sur-Loire

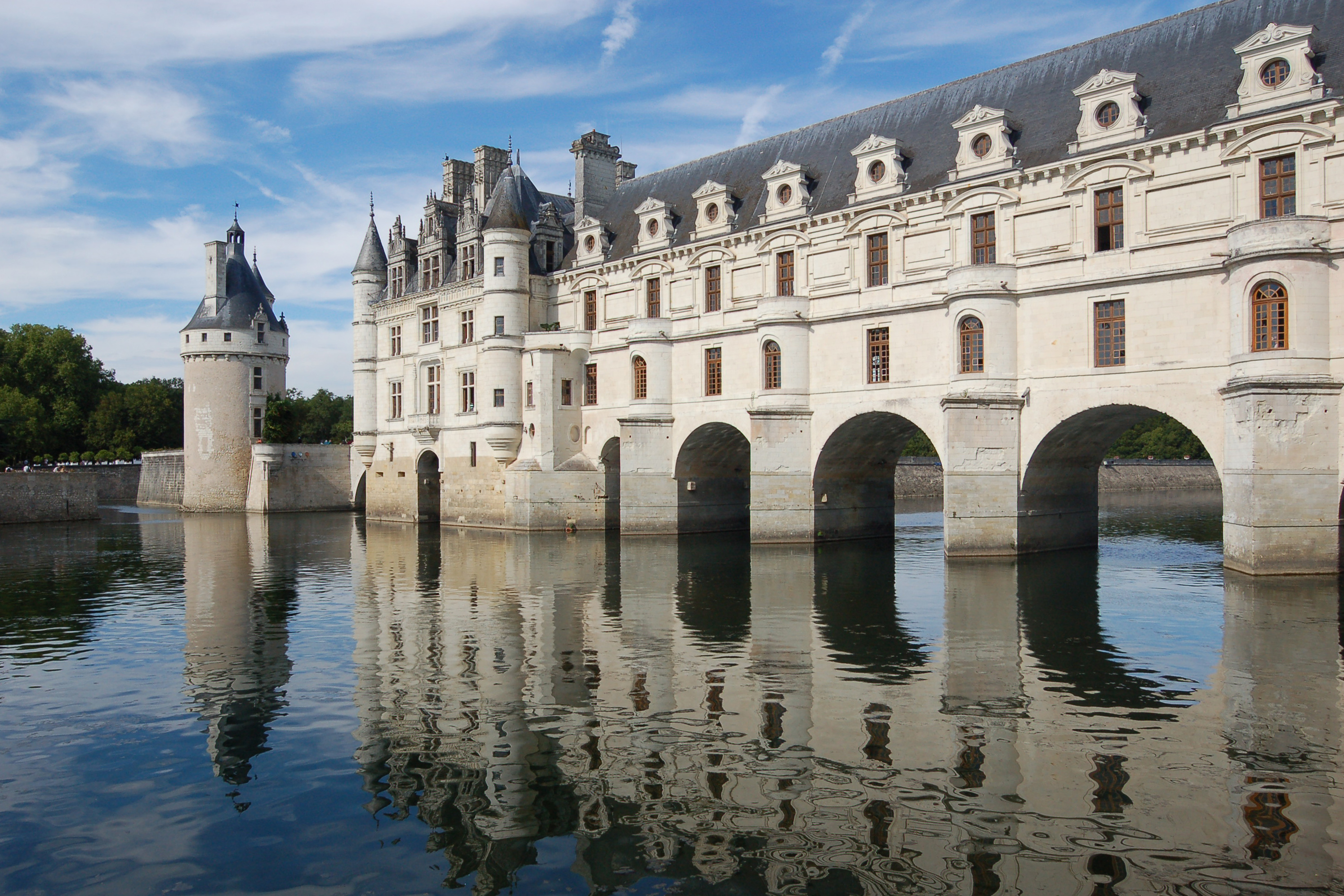
Château de Chenonceau

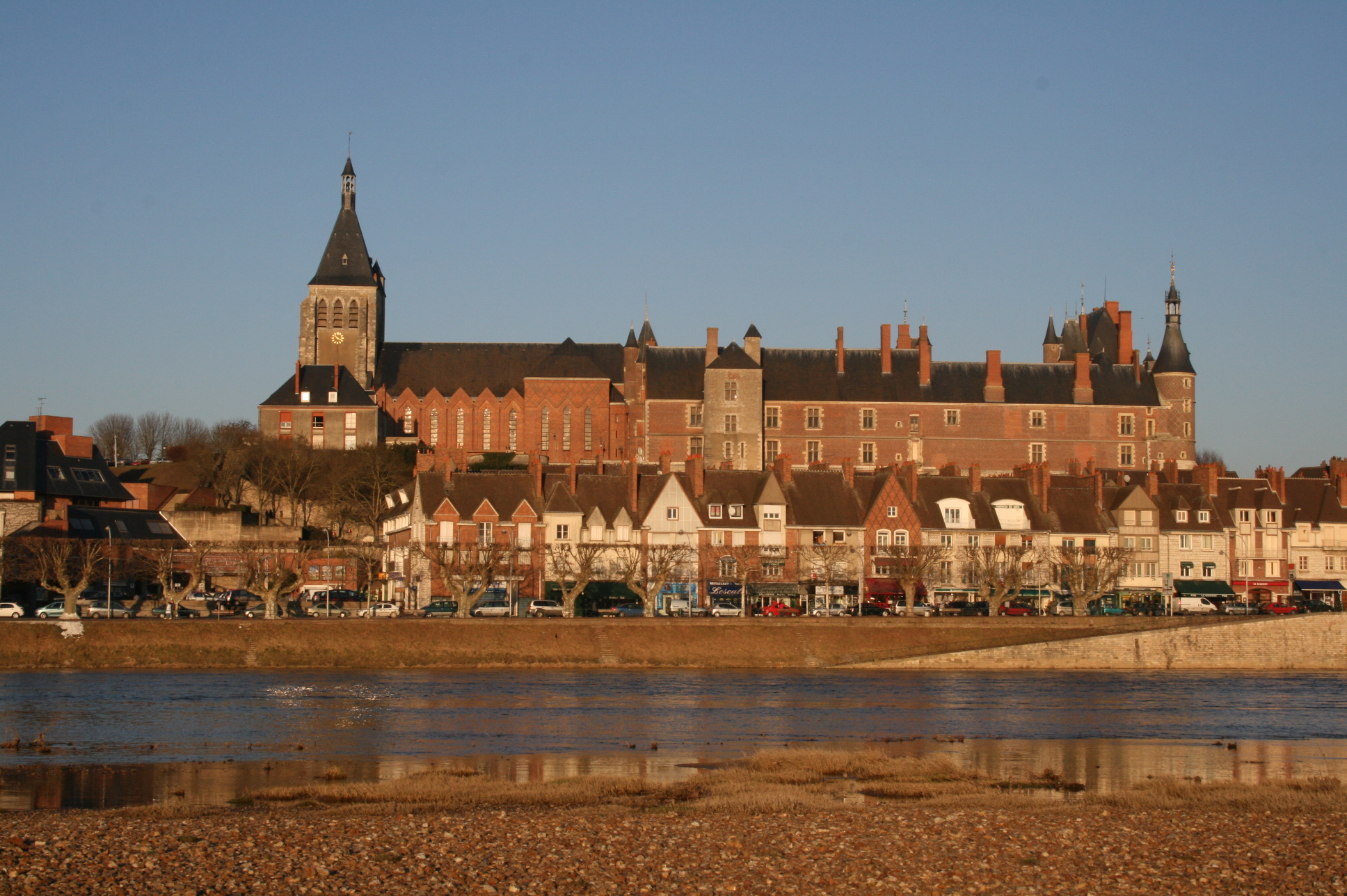
Château de Gien

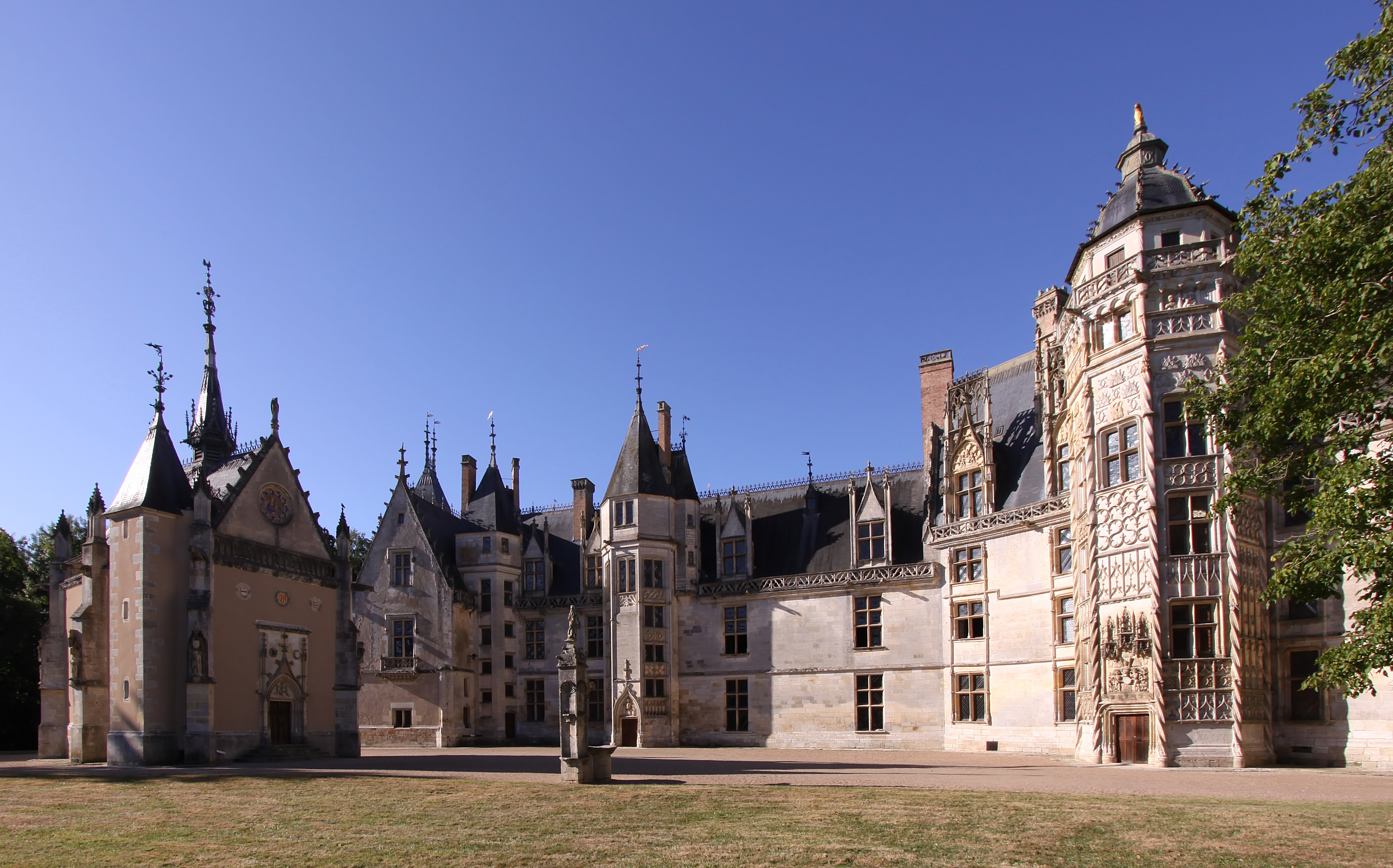
Château de Meillant

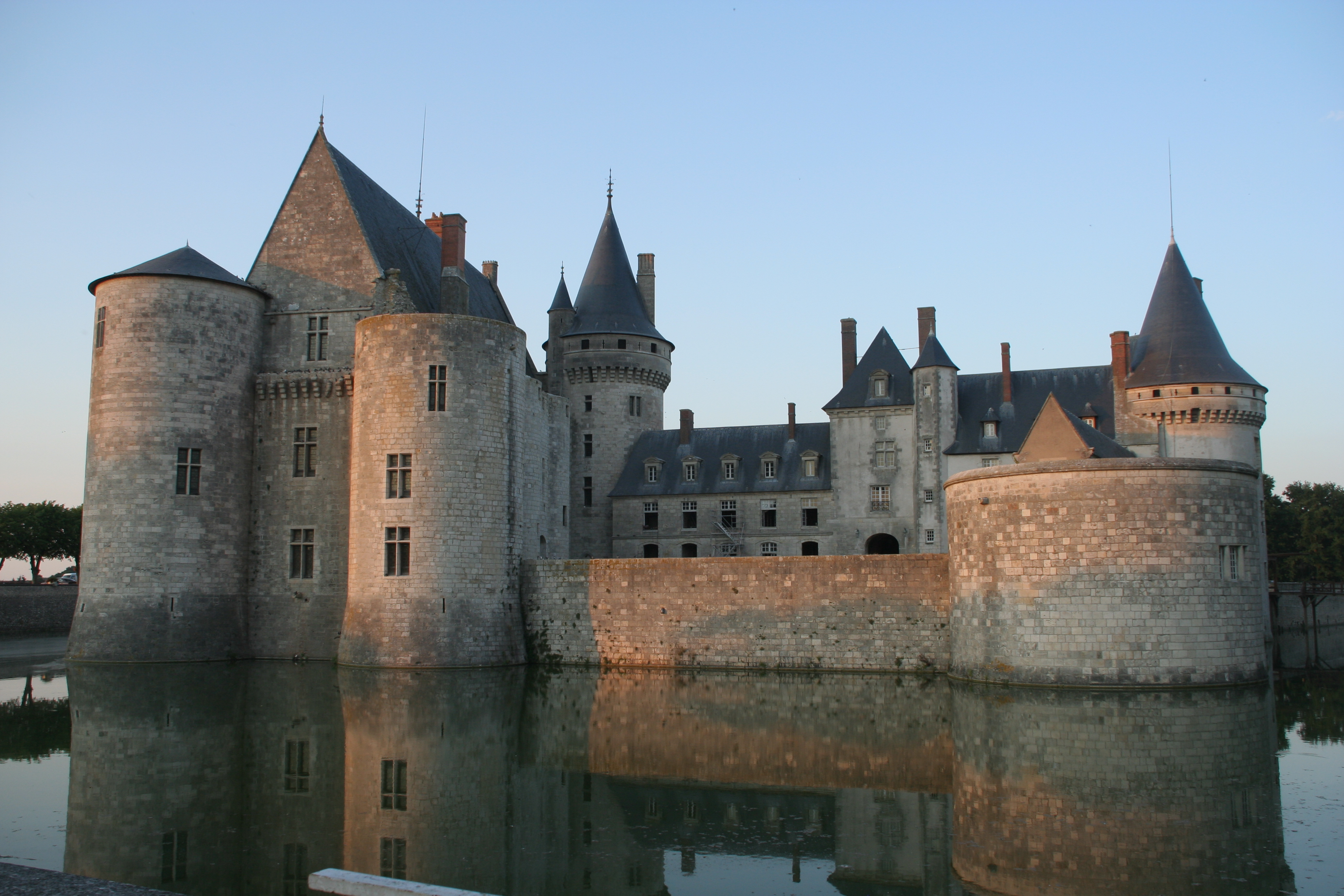
Château de Sully-sur-Loire

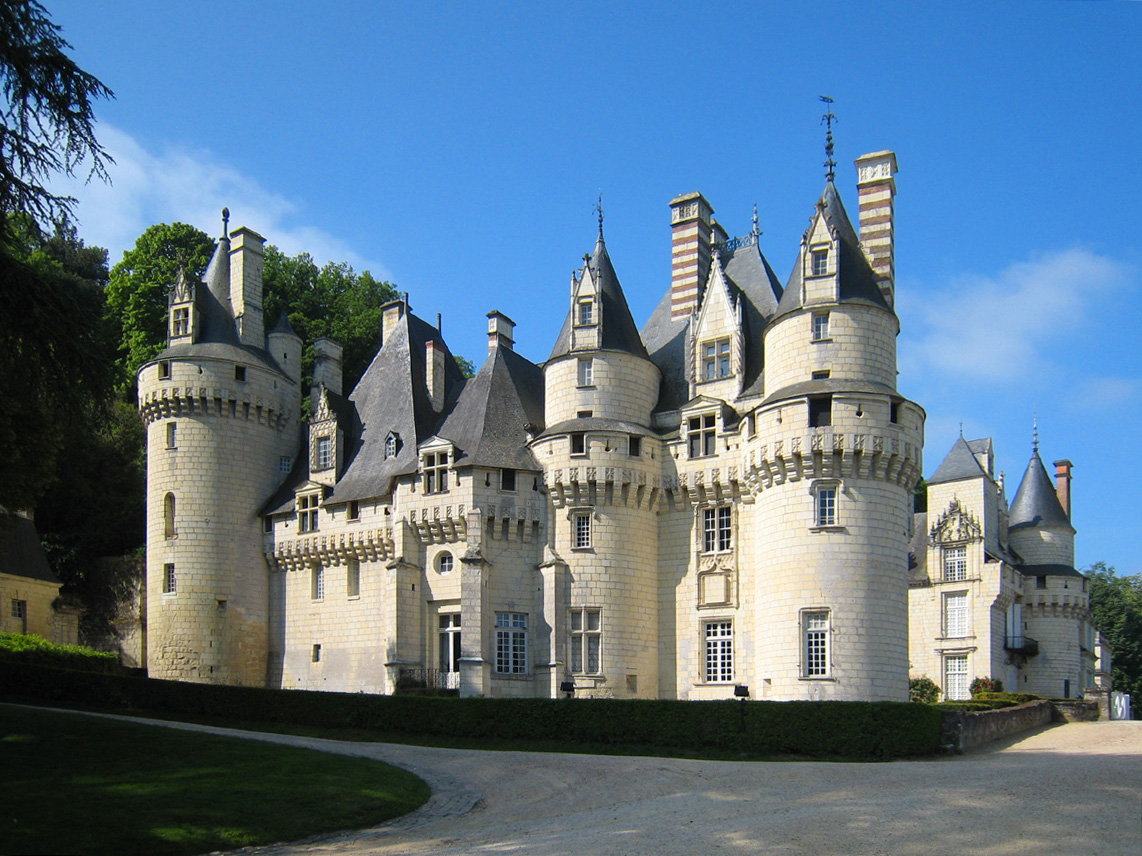
Château d'Ussé

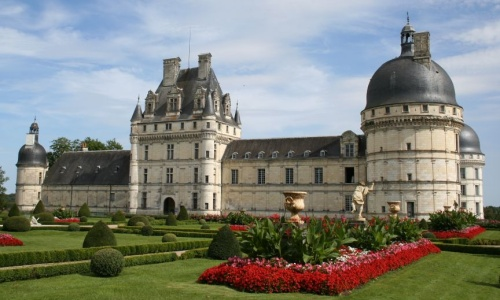
Château de Valençay

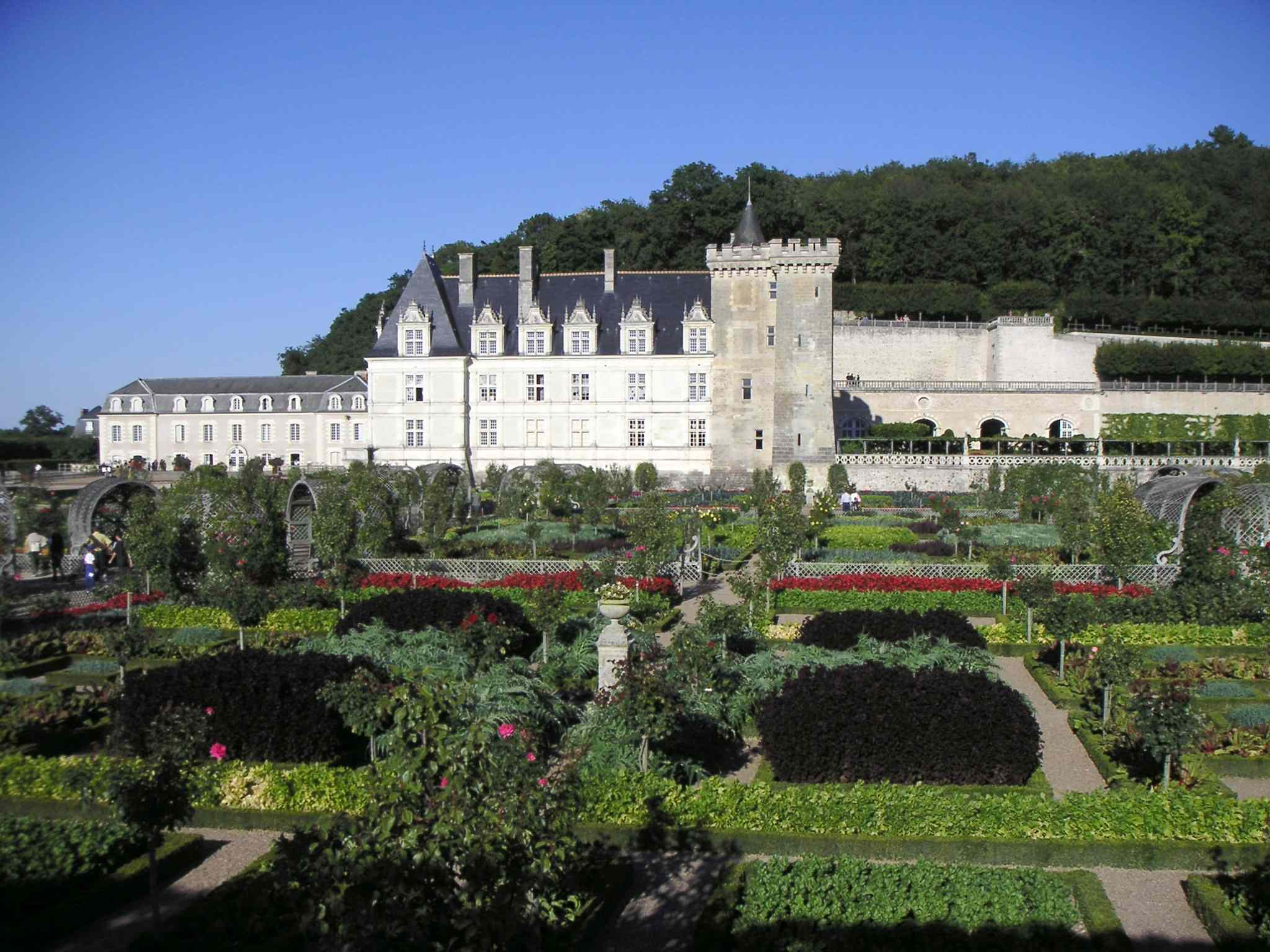
Château de Villandry

This page lists the châteaux of the French Centre-Val de Loire region. The buildings are arranged by Department.

== Cher ==
- Château d'Apremont in Apremont-sur-Allier
- Château d'Ainay-le-Vieil in Ainay-le-Vieil
- Château de Bannegon in Bannegon
- Château de Béthune in La Chapelle-d'Angillon
- Château de Beaujeu in Sens-Beaujeu
- Château de La Beuvrière in Saint-Hilaire-de-Court
- Château de Blet in Blet
- Château de Blosset in Vignoux-sur-Barangeon
- Château de Blancafort in Blancafort
- Château de Bonnais in Coust
- Château de Boucard in Le Noyer
- Château de Buranlure in Boulleret
- Château de Bruère-Allichamps in Bruère-Allichamps
- Château de Châteauneuf-sur-Cher in Châteauneuf-sur-Cher
- Château de la Commanderie in Farges-Allichamps
- Château de Coulon in Graçay
- Château de Culan in Culan
- Château du Creuzet in Coust
- Château du Grand-Besse in Saint-Maur
- Château de la Grand'Cour in Mornay-Berry
- Château de l'Hospital-du-Fresne in Blancafort
- Palais Jacques Coeur in Bourges
- Donjon de Jouy in Sancoins
- Château de Lignières in Lignières
- Château de Maupas in Morogues
- Château de Menetou-Salon in Menetou-Salon
- Château de Meillant in Meillant
- Château de Montalivet-Lagrange in Saint-Bouize
- Château de Mehun-sur-Yèvre in Mehun-sur-Yèvre
- Château de Montrond in Saint-Amand-Montrond
- Château de Neuvy-Deux-Clochers in Neuvy-Deux-Clochers
- Château de Pesselières in Jalognes
- Château du Pézéau in Boulleret
- Château du Plaix in Saint-Hilaire-en-Lignières
- Château du Préau in Nohant-en-Goût
- Château de Sagonne in Sagonne
- Château de la Salle in Colombiers
- Château de Saint-Florent-sur-Cher in Saint-Florent-sur-Cher
- Château féodal de Sancerre in Sancerre
- Château des Stuarts in Aubigny-sur-Nère
- Château de Terlan in Dun-sur-Auron
- Château de la Verrerie in Oizon
- Château de Villiers in Chassy
- Château de Vouzeron in Vouzeron
- Château d'Yssertieux in Chalivoy-Milon

== Eure-et-Loir ==
- Château d'Abondant in Abondant
- Château d'Anet in Anet
- Château d'Arnouville in Gommerville
- Château de Baronville in Auneau
- Château de Brou in Brou
- Château de Charbonnières in Charbonnières
- Château de Châteaudun in Châteaudun
- Château de Châteauneuf
- Château de Courtalain in Courtalain
- Château de Dreux in Dreux
- Château d'Esclimont in Saint-Symphorien-le-Château
- Château de La Ferté-Vidame in La Ferté-Vidame
- Château de Frazé in Frazé
- Château du Hallier in La Ferté-Vidame
- Château de Herces in Berchères-sur-Vesgre
- Château du Jonchet in Romilly-sur-Aigre
- Château de Levesville in Bailleau-l'Évêque
- Château de Maintenon in Maintenon
- Château de Memillon in Saint-Maur-sur-le-Loir
- Château de Montboissier in Montboissier (ruined)
- Château de Montigny le Gannelon in Montigny-le-Gannelon
- Château de Moresville in Flacey
- Château du Puiset in Puiset
- Château de Roussainville in Illiers-Combray
- Château Saint-Jean in Nogent-le-Rotrou
- Château de Senonches in Senonches
- Château de Sorel in Sorel-Moussel
- Château de Spoir in Mignières
- Château des Vaux in Pontgouin
- Château de Villebon in Villebon
- Château de Villemesle in Boisgasson

== Indre ==
- Château d'Argy in Argy
- Château d'Azay-le-Ferron in Azay-le-Ferron
- Château du Boisrenault in Buzançais
- Château de Bouchet-en-Brenne in Rosnay
- Château de Bouges in Bouges-le-Château
- Château de Brosse in Chaillac
- Château de Clavières in Ardentes
- Château de Cluis-Dessous in Cluis
- Château de Cluis-Dessus, manor house and town hall of Cluis
- Château de Frapesle in Issoudun
- Château d'Ingrandes in Ingrandes
- Château d'Issoudun in Issoudun
- Château de Levroux in Levroux
- Château-Guillaume in Lignac
- Château du Magnet in Mers-sur-Indre
- Château du Mée in Pellevoisin
- Château du Mont in Sazeray
- Château de Palluau in Palluau-sur-Indre
- Château de la Prune-au-Pot in Ceaulmont
- Château de Puybardeau in Lignerolles
- Castel Raoul in Châteauroux
- Château de Romefort in Ciron
- Château de Sarzay in Sarzay
- Château de la Tour-Rivarennes in Rivarennes
- Château de Valençay in Valençay

== Indre-et-Loire ==
- Château d'Amboise in Amboise
- Château d'Artigny in Montbazon
- Château d'Azay-le-Rideau in Azay-le-Rideau
- Château de la Bourdaisière in Montlouis-sur-Loire
- Château de Candé in Monts
- Château de La Celle-Guenand in La Celle-Guenand
- Château de Champchevrier in Cléré-les-Pins
- Château de Chanteloup in Amboise
- Château du Châtelier in Paulmy
- Château de Chenonceau in Chenonceaux
- Château de Chinon in Chinon
- Château de Cinq-Mars la Pile in Cinq-Mars-la-Pile
- Manoir du Clos-Lucé in Amboise
- Manoir de La Côte in Reugny
- Château de Gizeux in Gizeux
- Château du Grand-Pressigny in Grand-Pressigny
- Château de la Guerche in La Guerche
- Château de Jallanges in Vouvray
- Château de Langeais in Langeais
- Château de Loches in Loches
- Château de Luynes in Luynes
- Manoir de Monfort in Chançay
- Château de Montpoupon in Céré-la-Ronde
- Château de Montrésor in Montrésor
- Château de Nitray in Athée-sur-Cher
- Château de Paulmy in Paulmy
- Château de Plessis-lez-Tours in La Riche
- Château des Réaux in Chouzé-sur-Loire
- Château de Reignac in Reignac-sur-Indre
- Château de Richelieu in Richelieu
- Château d'Ussé in Rigny-Ussé
- Château du Rivau in Lémeré
- Château de Rochecotte in Saint-Patrice
- Château de Saché in Saché
- Château des Sept Tours in Courcelles-de-Touraine
- Château des Thômeaux in Mosnes
- Château de Tours in Tours
- Château des Vallées in Tournon-Saint-Pierre
- Château de Valmer in Chançay
- Château de Vaujours in Château-la-Vallière
- Château de Villandry in Villandry

== Loir-et-Cher ==
- Château de Beauregard in Cellettes
- Château de Blois in Blois
- Château du Breuil in Cheverny
- Château de Chambord in Chambord
- Château de Chaslay in Montoire-sur-le-Loir
- Château de Chaumont-sur-Loire in Chaumont-sur-Loire
- Château de Cheverny in Cheverny
- Château de Chissay in Chissay-en-Touraine
- Château de Droué in Droué
- Château de Fougères-sur-Bièvre in Fougères-sur-Bièvre
- Château du Fresnes in Authon
- Château du Gué-Péan in Monthou-sur-Cher
- Château d'Herbilly in Mer
- Château de Lavardin in Lavardin
- Château de Matval in Bonneveau
- Château de Menars in Menars
- Château de Montoire in Montoire-sur-le-Loir
- Château de Montrichard in Montrichard
- Château du Moulin in Lassay-sur-Croisne
- Château du Plessis-Fortia in Huisseau-en-Beauce
- Château de la Possonnière in Couture-sur-Loir, (dit château de Ronsard)
- Château de Saint-Denis-sur-Loire in Saint-Denis-sur-Loire
- Château de Selles-sur-Cher in Selles-sur-Cher
- Château de Talcy in Talcy
- Château de Troussay in Cheverny
- Château de Vendôme in Vendôme
- Château de Villesavin in Tour-en-Sologne

== Loiret ==
- Château d'Ardoise in Pithiviers
- Château d'Audeville in Audeville
- Château d'Augerville in Augerville-la-Rivière
- Château de Beaugency in Beaugency
- Château de Bellecour in Pithiviers
- Château de Bellegarde in Bellegarde
- Château de Boisgibault in Ardon
- Château de Bondaroy in Bondaroy
- Château de Bon-Hôtel in Ligny-le-Ribault
- Château de La Bussière in La Bussière
- Château de Chamerolles in Chilleurs-aux-Bois
- Château de Champvallin in Sandillon
- Château de Châteauneuf-sur-Loire in Châteauneuf-sur-Loire
- Château de Châteaurenard in Château-Renard
- Château de Châtillon-Coligny in Châtillon-Coligny
- Château de Chenailles in Saint-Denis-de-l'Hôtel
- Château de la Cherelle in Jargeau
- Château de Chevilly in Chevilly
- Château de Claireau in Sully-la-Chapelle
- Château de Combreux in Combreux
- Château de Cormes in Saint-Cyr-en-Val
- Château de Cuissy in Lion-en-Sullias
- Château de la Ferté in La Ferté-Saint-Aubin
- Château de la Forêt in Montcresson
- Château du Gamereau, in Sandillon
- Château de Gautray in Saint-Cyr-en-Val
- Château de Gien in Gien
- Château du Gué-Gaillard in Férolles
- Château du Hallier in Nibelle
- Château de l'Isle in Saint-Denis-en-Val
- Château de la Jonchère in Saint-Cyr-en-Val
- Château de La Fontaine in Olivet
- Château de Lorris in Montargis
- Château de Malesherbes in Malesherbes
- Château des Marais in Sandillon
- Château de Meung-sur-Loire in Meung-sur-Loire
- Château de Montargis in Montargis
- Château de Morchêne in Saint-Cyr-en-Val
- Château de la Motte in Château-Renard
- Château de la Motte in Saint-Cyr-en-Val
- Château du Muguet in Breteau
- Château de Nainvilliers in Dadonville
- Château de Nogent-sur-Vernisson in Nogent-sur-Vernisson
- Château de Pont-Chevron in Ouzouer-sur-Trézée
- Château de la Porte in Sandillon
- Château du Poutyl in Olivet
- Château de Puchesse in Sandillon
- Château de La Queuvre in Férolles
- Château de Reyville in Saint-Cyr-en-Val
- Château de Rochefort in Barville-en-Gâtinais
- Château de Rocheplatte in Aulnay-la-Rivière
- Château de Saint-Brisson in Saint-Brisson-sur-Loire
- Château de Solaire in Bonnée
- Château de Sully-sur-Loire in Sully-sur-Loire
- Château de Trousse-Barrière in Briare
- Château de Viéville in Saint-Cyr-en-Val
- Château de Yèvre in Yèvre-la-Ville

== See also ==
- Châteaux of the Loire Valley
- List of châteaux in France
- List of castles in France
