= Château de Bon-Hôtel (Ligny-le-Ribault) =

Château in Centre-Val de Loire, France

- Ligny-le-Ribault in France
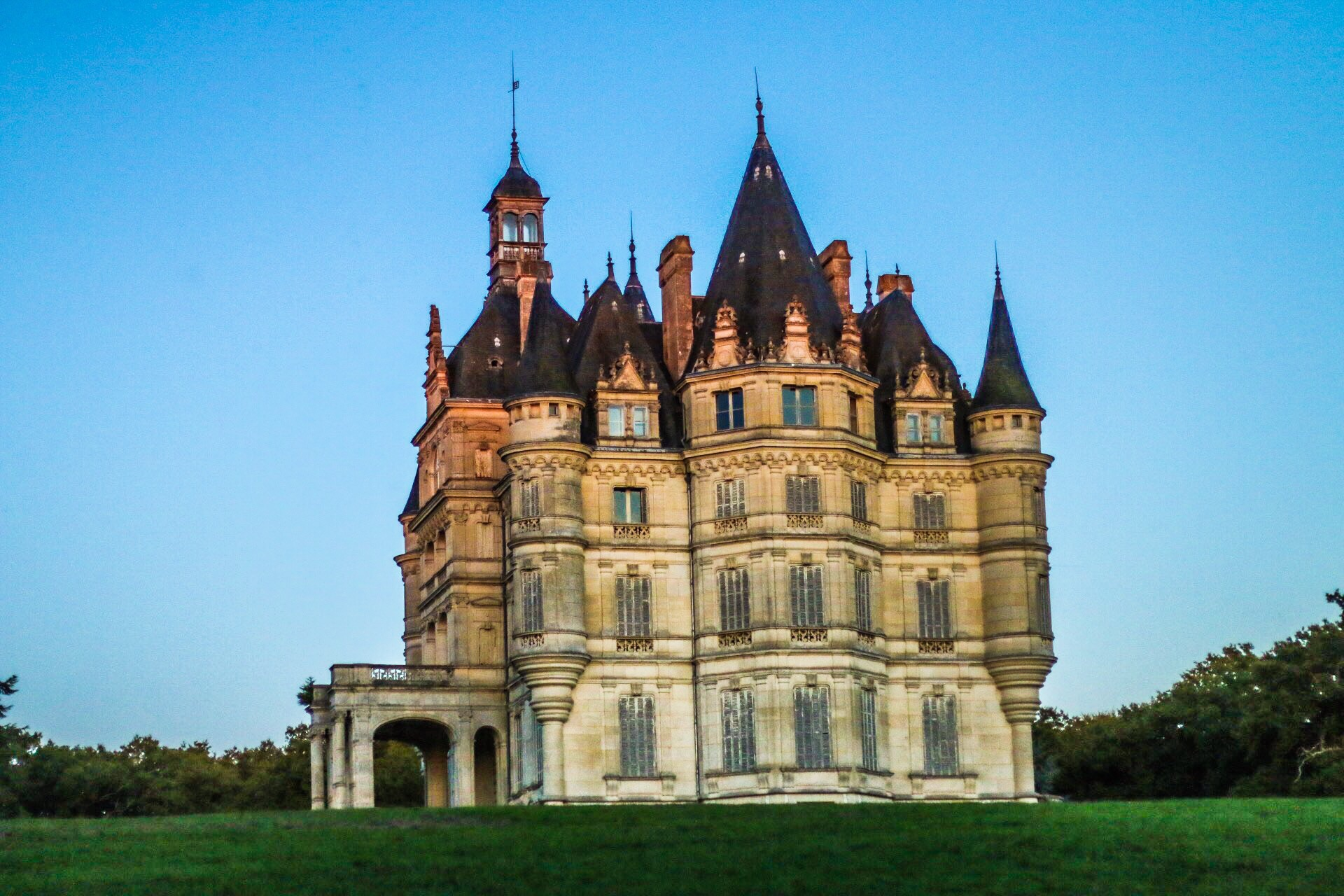

Location
- Coordinates: 47°41′03″N 1°45′12″E

Site history
- Built: 1875
- Built by: Clément Parent; Louis Parent

Garrison information
- Occupants: Georges Dupré de Saint Maur

The Château de Bon-Hôtel is a château of the 19th century, located in Ligny-le-Ribault, in Loiret in the region of Centre-Val de Loire.

== Geography ==
The building is located in the territory of the commune of Ligny-le-Ribault (Loiret), to the west of the town, in the region of Sologne, at the southern tip of the Creux pond.

From Ligny-le-Ribault, the castle is accessible via the Chemin de Saint-Laurent located near road 19.

== History ==
Georges Dupré de Saint Maur, general councilor of the canton of La Ferté-Saint-Aubin (1877-1889) and mayor of Ligny-le-Ribault (1878-1902), had the château built between 1875 and 1882.

In 1923, the château, which at that time belonged to the Poniatowski family, was acquired by the Swiss industrialist Henry Burrus to indulge his passion for horse riding.

The château has been listed in the inventory of historic monuments since September 3, 1991.

== Description ==
The building was initially designed to be a place for social receptions and more particularly a hunting meeting place.
