= Manoir de La Côte =

- Location within France

General information
- Coordinates: 47°28′14″N 0°52′46″E

The Manoir de La Côte is a historic manor in Reugny, Indre-et-Loire, Centre-Val de Loire, France.

== History ==
It was built in the second half of the 15th century and the 16th century. It was designed in the Renaissance architectural style. The chapel was built in the 16th century and the dovecote in the 18th century.

== Architectural significance ==
It has been listed as an official historical monument by the French Ministry of Culture since 1989.
