= Château de Trousse-Barrière =

Historic manor in Centre-Val de Loire, France

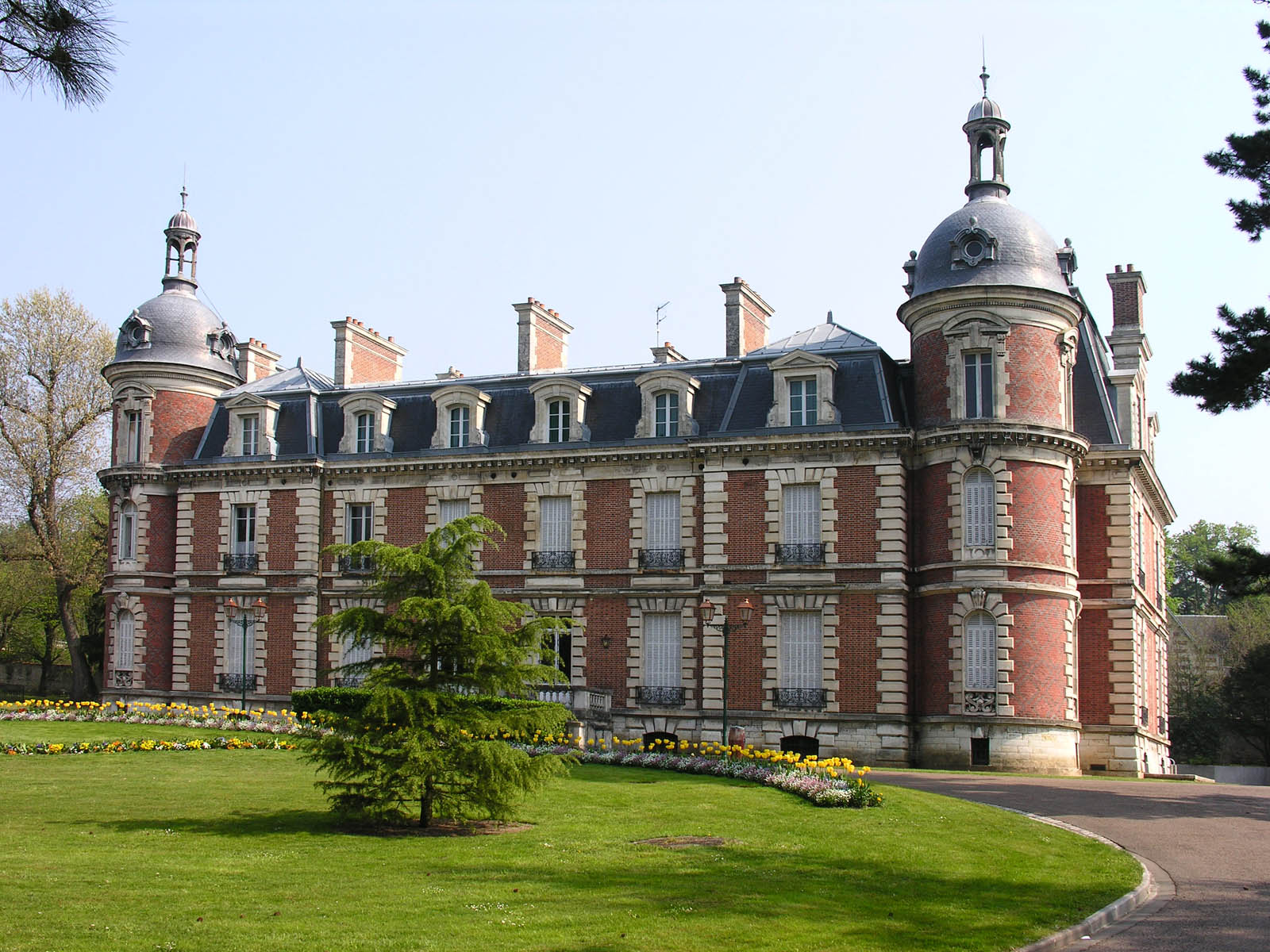

- Location within France

General information
- Coordinates: 47°38′38″N 2°44′11″E

The Château de Trousse-Barrière is a historic manor in Briare, Loiret, Indre-et-Loire, Centre-Val de Loire, France.

== History ==
It was built from 1885 to 1890 for Paul Yver, the brother-in-law of business tycoon Jean-Félix Bapterosses, the owner of the Emaux de Briare. The ceiling in the lounge was painted by Henri Harpignies. After invitation the Austrian artist Adam Jankowski worked there for one year.
