= Château de Senonches =

- Senonches, Eure-et-Loir, France
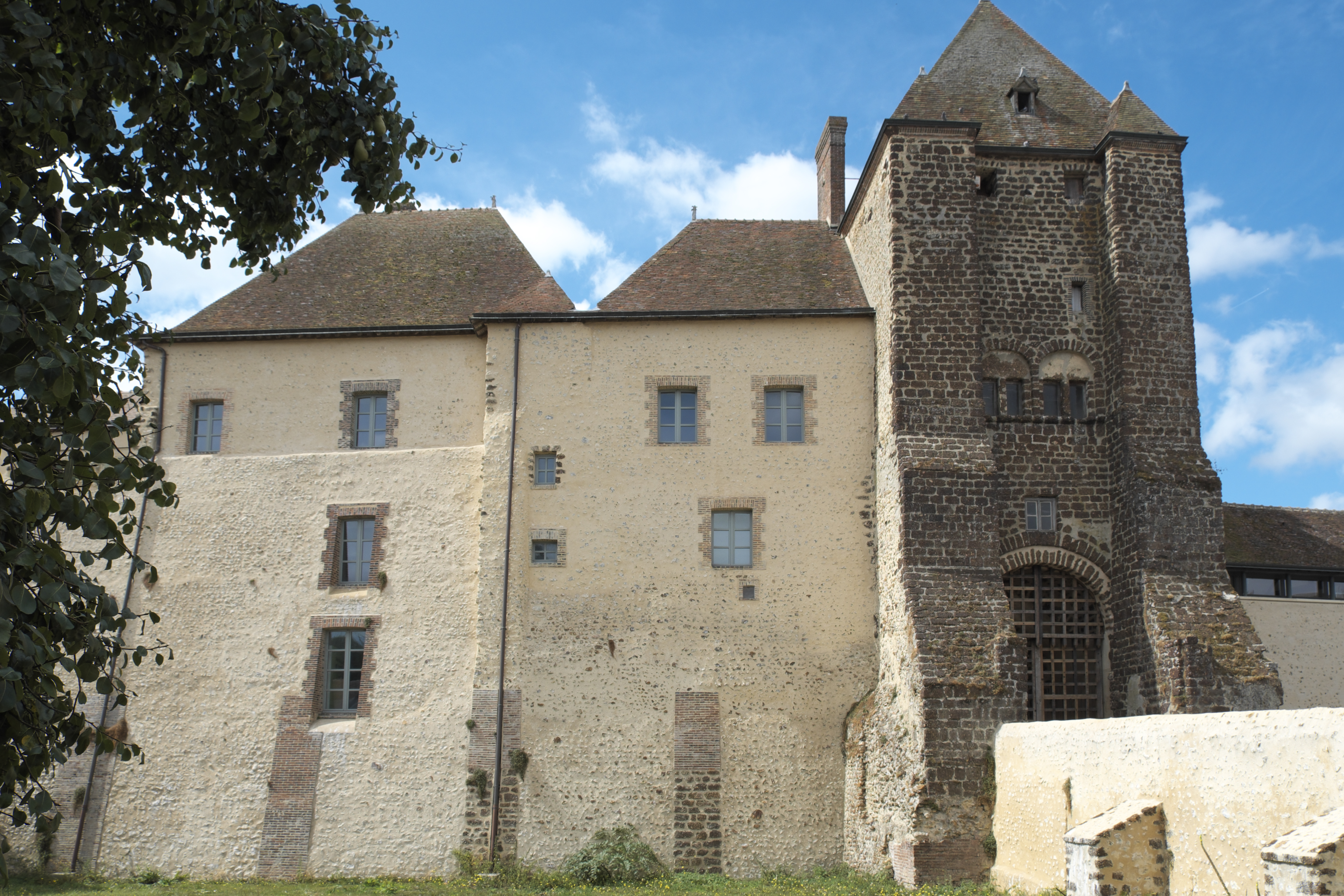

Site information
- Type: castle

Location
- Coordinates: 48°33′34″N 1°02′16″E

Château de Senonches was a castle in Senonches, in the French department of Eure-et-Loir.

== History ==
A castle existed since the 11th century. A new castle was built by Hugues II, lord of Châteauneuf-en-Thymerais on the site of the ruins of the castle.

== Protection ==
The castle is partially classified as Monument Historique (keep of the old castle) and partially registered (the two buildings to the east side of the keep).

Senonches castle

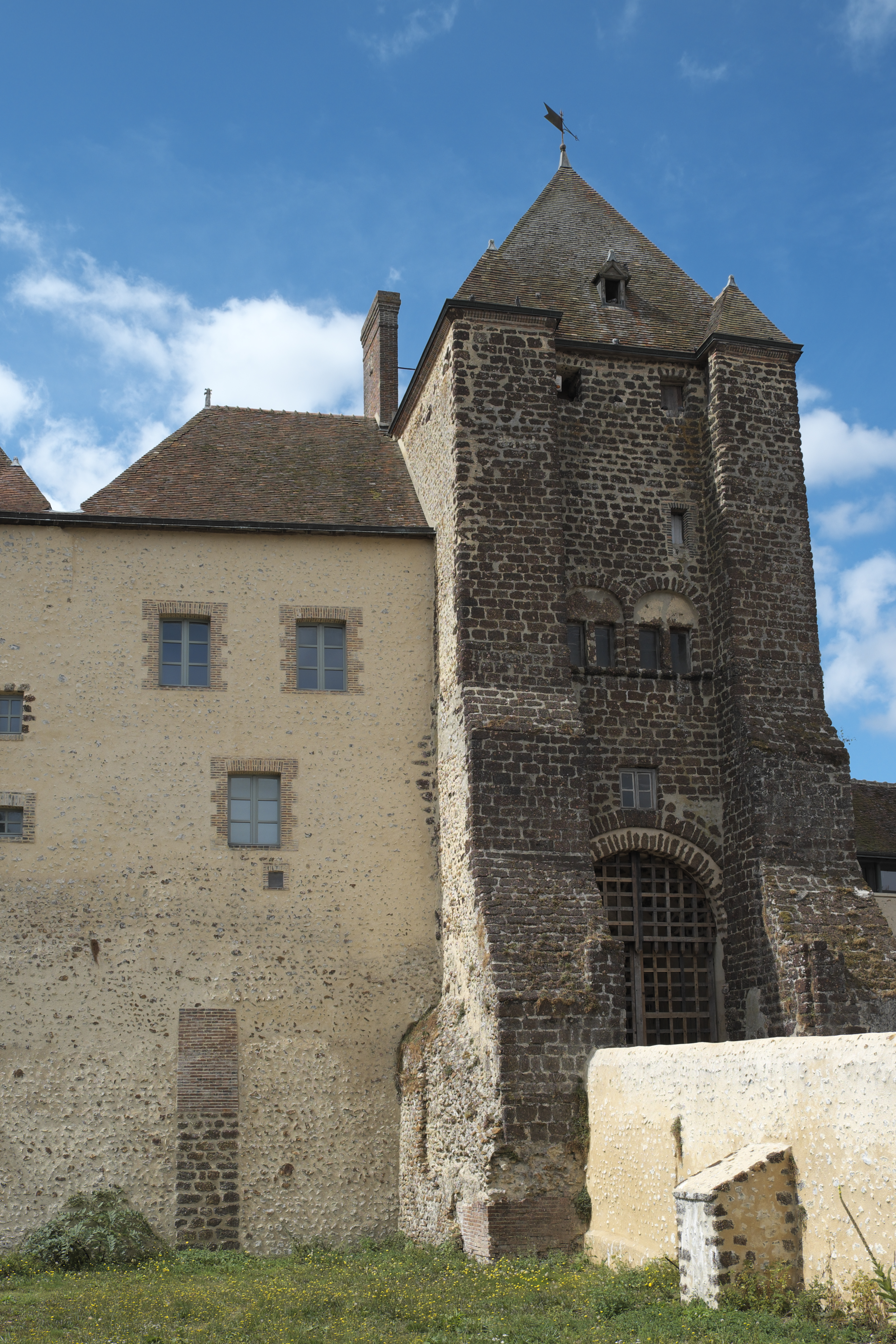

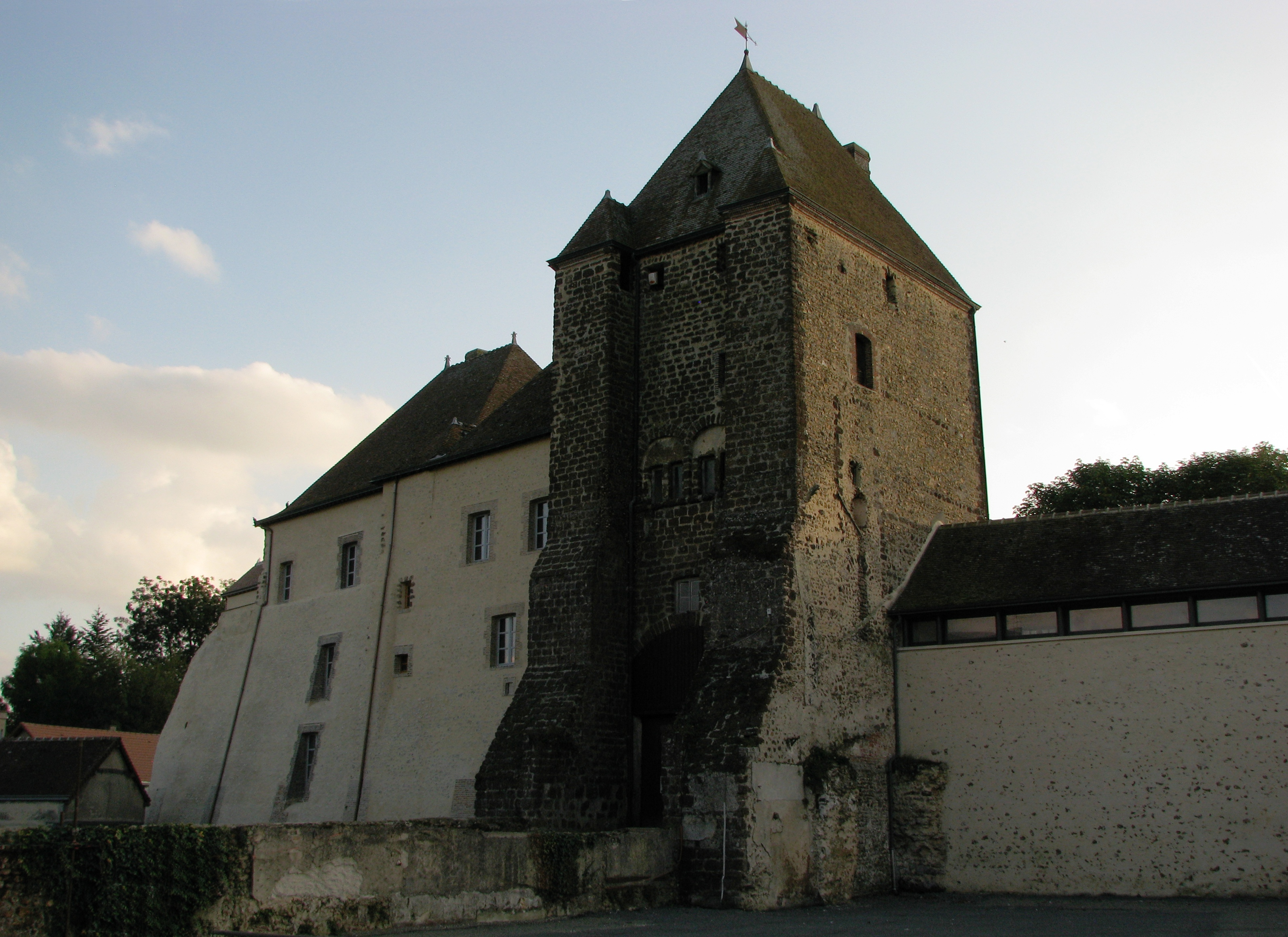

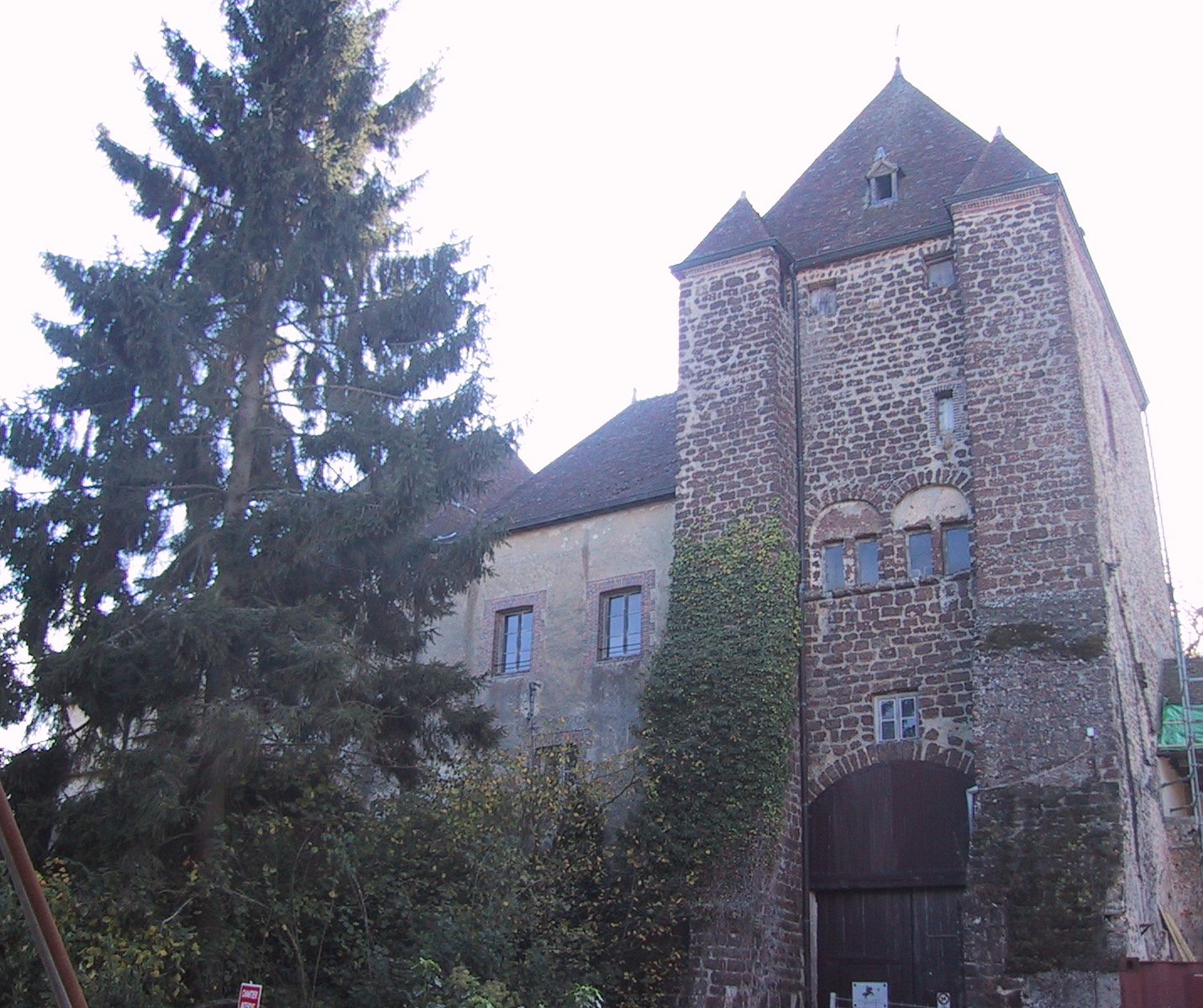

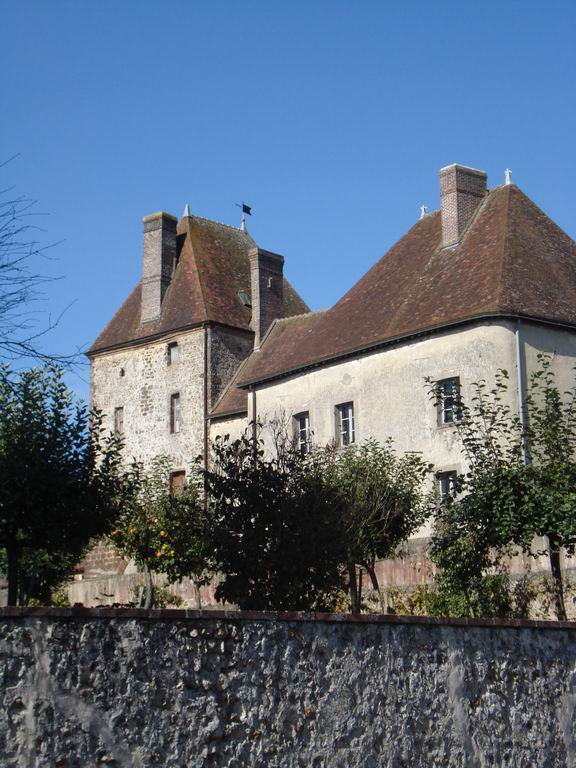

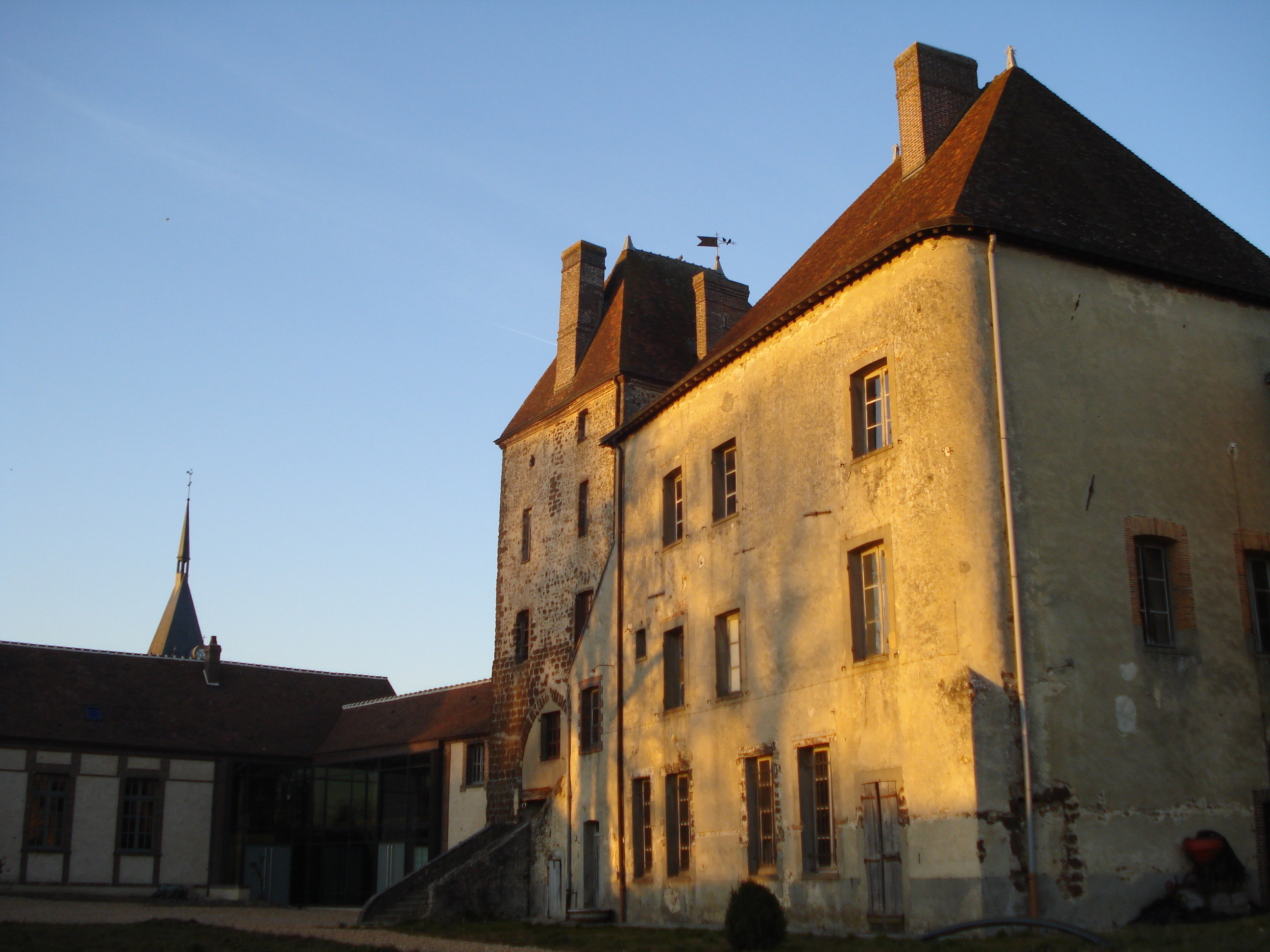

== See also ==
- List of châteaux in Eure-et-Loir
