= Paulmy =

- Commune
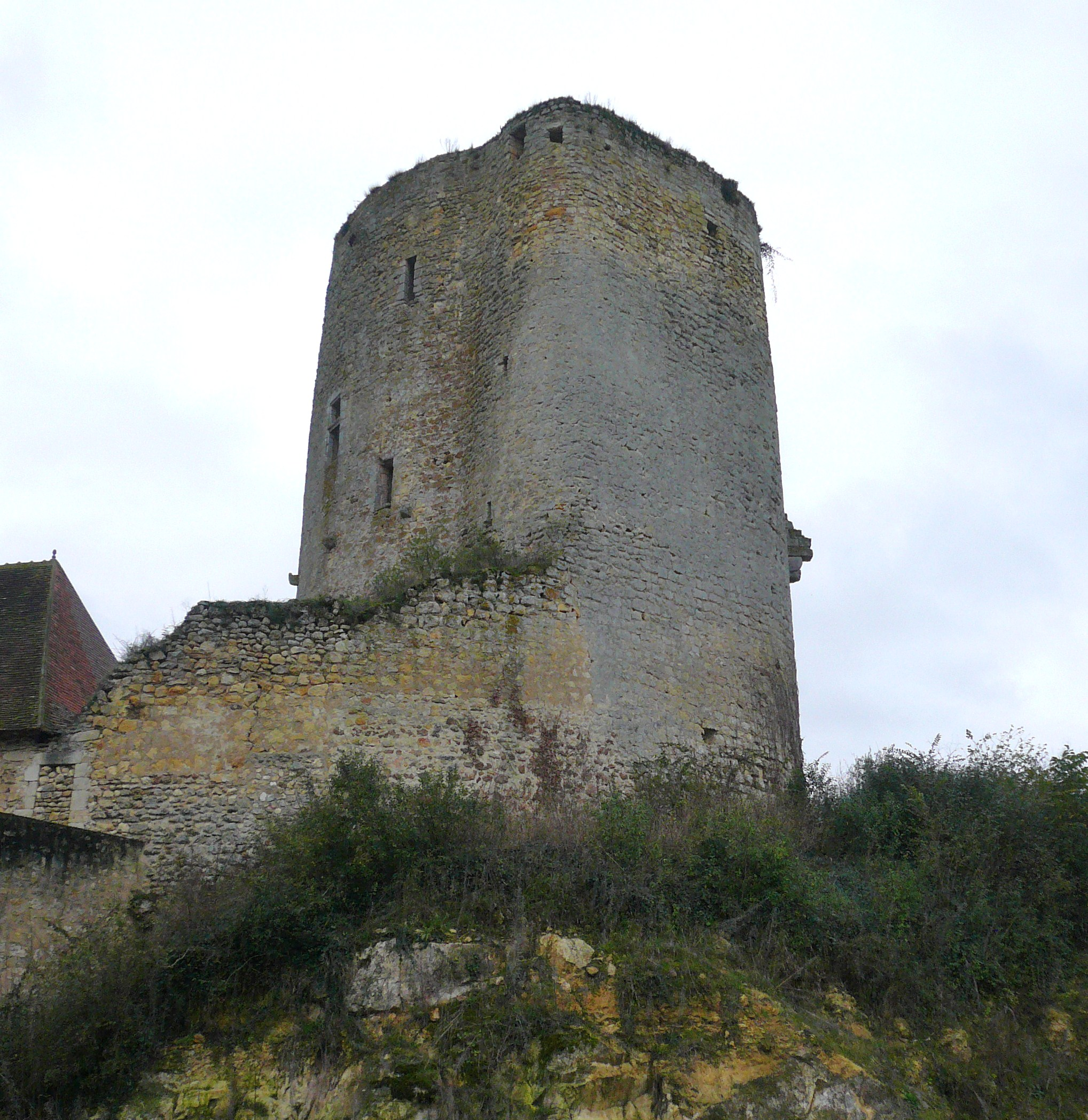
- The ruins of the Château du Châtelier, in Paulmy
- Location of Paulmy
- Location within France Location within Centre-Val de Loire
- Coordinates: 46°58′54″N 0°50′19″E
- Country: France
- Region: Centre-Val de Loire
- Department: Indre-et-Loire
- Arrondissement: Loches
- Canton: Descartes
- Intercommunality: CC Loches Sud Touraine

Government
  - Mayor (2020–2026): Dominique Frelon
- Area^{1}: 25.97 km^{2} (10.03 sq mi)
- Highest elevation: 127 m (417 ft)
- Lowest elevation: 72 m (236 ft)
- Population (2023): 238
  - Density: 9.16/km^{2} (23.7/sq mi)
- Time zone: UTC+01:00 (CET)
  - Summer (DST): UTC+02:00 (CEST)
- INSEE/Postal code: 37181 /37350
- ^{1} French Land Register data, which excludes lakes, ponds, glaciers > 1 km^{2} (0.386 sq mi or 247 acres) and river estuaries.

Paulmy (French pronunciation: [polmi]) is a commune in the Indre-et-Loire department in central France.

== Population ==
Historical population
| Year | Pop. | ±% p.a. |
|---|---|---|
| 1968 | 523 | — |
| 1975 | 437 | −2.53% |
| 1982 | 318 | −4.44% |
| 1990 | 269 | −2.07% |
| 1999 | 261 | −0.33% |
| 2007 | 258 | −0.14% |
| 2012 | 233 | −2.02% |
| 2017 | 233 | +0.00% |
| 2023 | 238 | +0.35% |
Source: INSEE

== See also ==
- Communes of the Indre-et-Loire department
