= Château de Nogent-le-Rotrou =

Castle and museum in Eure-et-Loir, France

- Nogent-le-Rotrou, Eure-et-Loir, Centre-Val de Loire, France
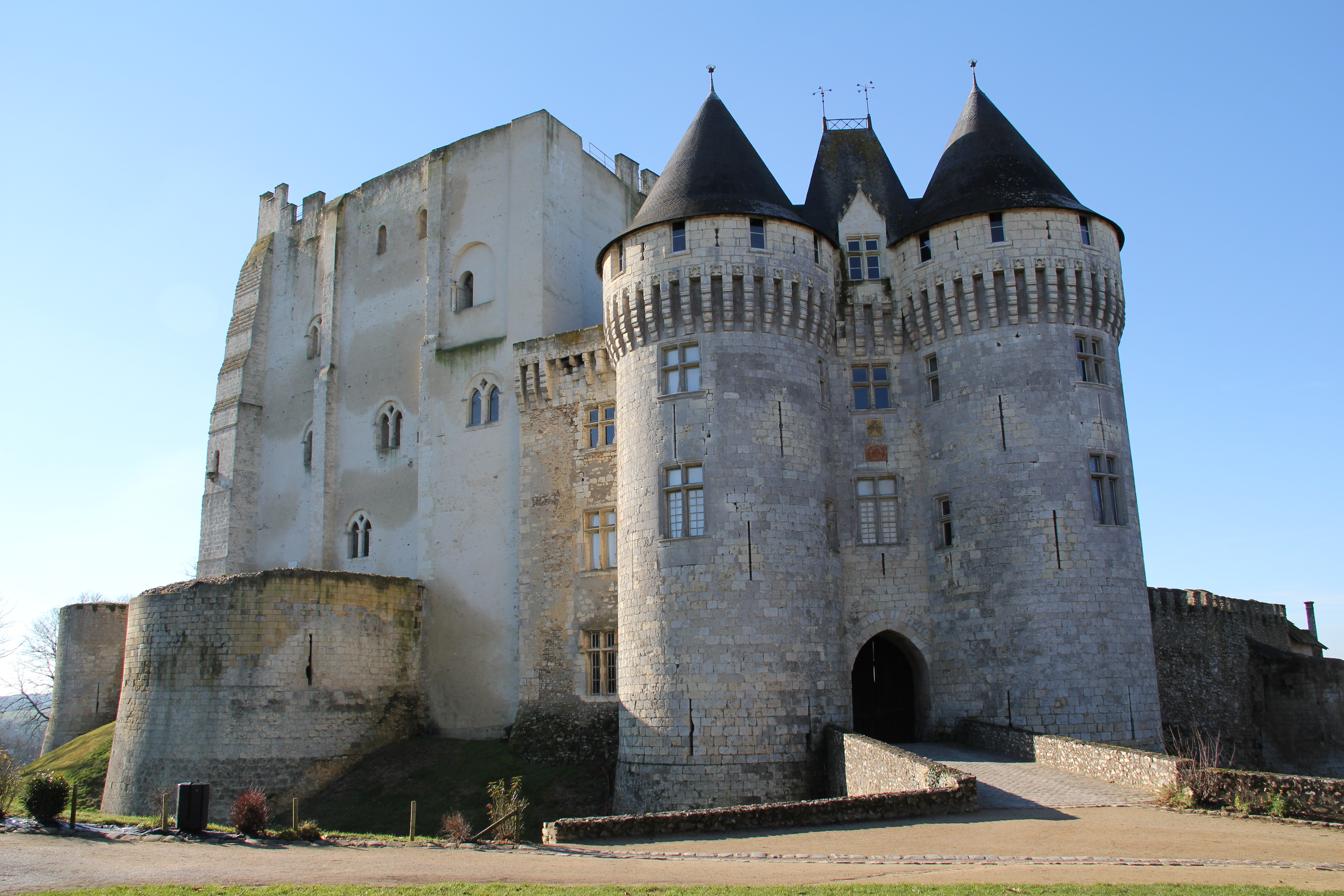

Site information
- Type: castle

Location
- Coordinates: 48.3142°N 0.8206°E

Site history
- Built: 1040s
- Designations: monument historique

The Château Saint-Jean is a castle in the commune of Nogent-le-Rotrou in the Eure-et-Loir département of France.

== History ==
Château Saint-Jean, which overlooks the roads from Chartres to Le Mans and from Châteaudun to Bellême from the plateau on which its stands, was built in several stages. The rectangular keep, 17 by 24 metres (56 ft × 79 ft) in area, made of stone, remains 35 metres (115 ft) high. It was built in the 1040s, making it one of the oldest keeps of this type still standing in France. Its thick walls (3.5 metres (11 ft) at the base and 1.50 metres (4 ft 11 in) at the top) and the scarcity of its openings reflect its military purpose. The circular enclosure and the towers date from the end of the 12th century and the beginning of the 13th century. A dry moat crossed by a drawbridge and the slope of the terrain to the west completed the defensive system. Between the 15th and the 16th centuries, several constructions gave the castle a more residential function, while the keep was abandoned.

Without a garrison from the 17th century, the castle served as a prison during the French Revolution, before being sold to individuals. Purchased by the town in 1950 and partially restored between 2000 and 2004, the castle has housed the municipal museum since 1959. The 155 "Saint-Jean steps" (marches Saint-Jean) connect the castle to the Paty district, where several Renaissance mansions remain.

== Protection ==
It was registered as a monument historique by the French Ministry of Culture in 1948 and 1950 and protected in 1952.

Château Saint-Jean

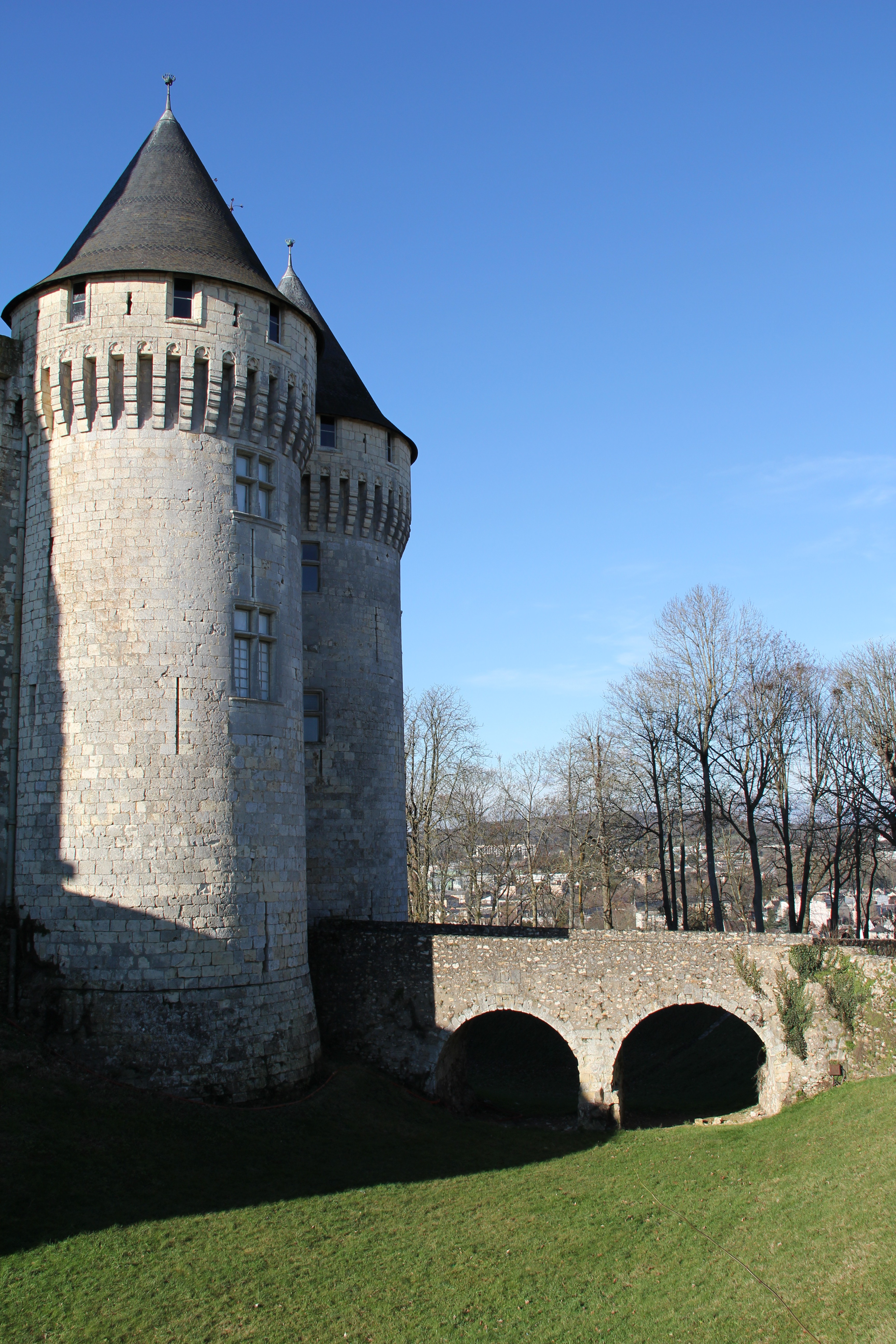

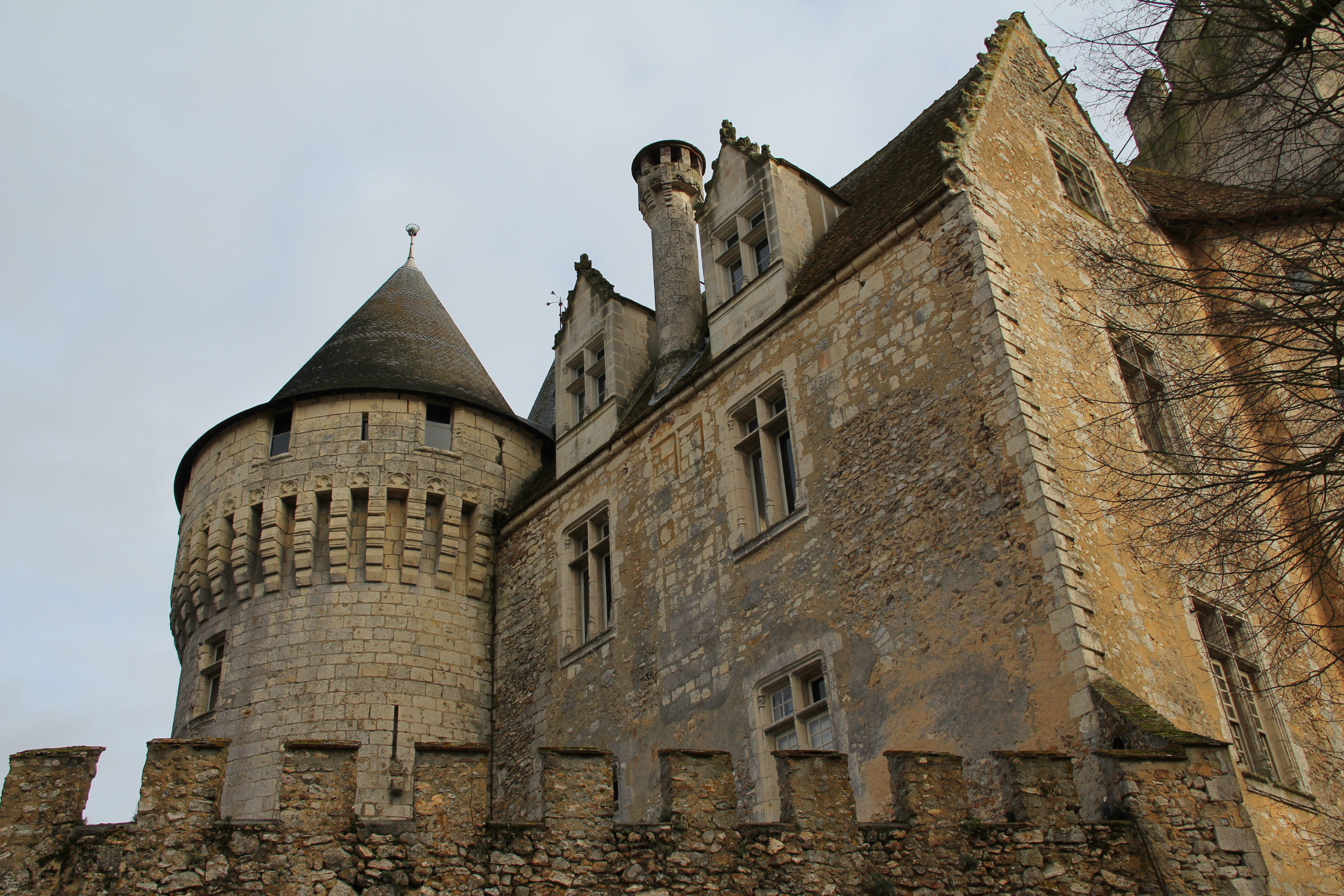

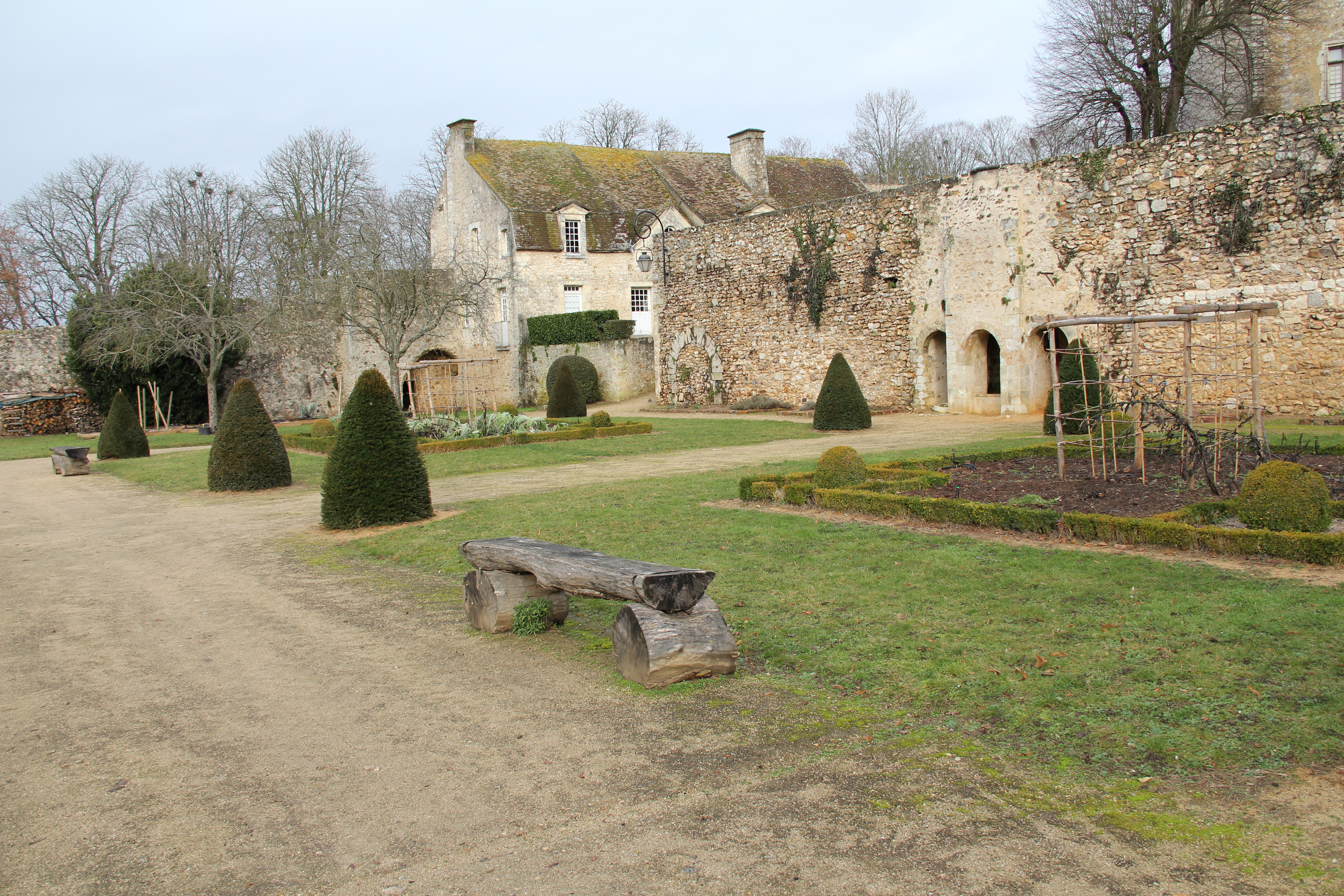
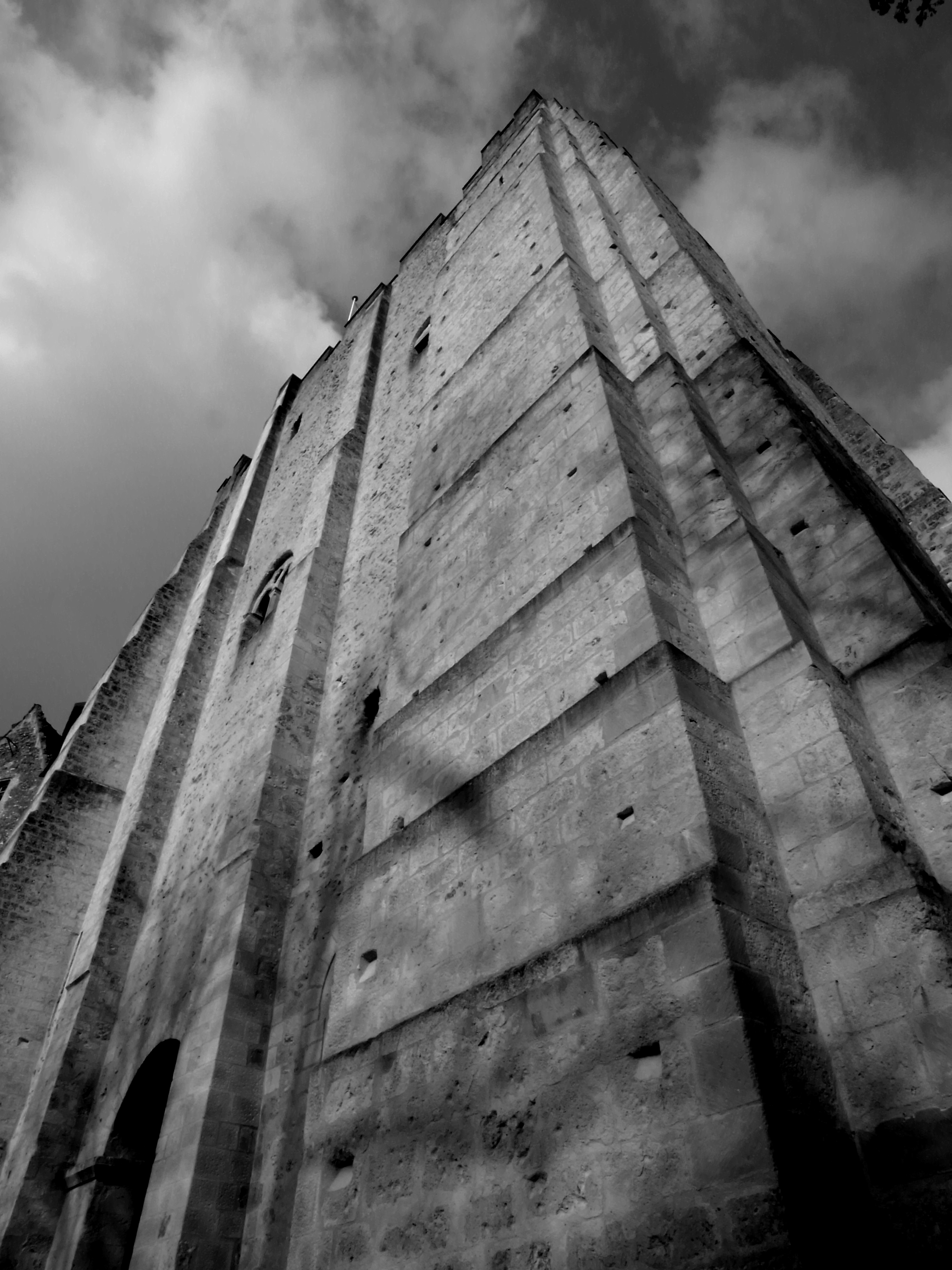
Keep

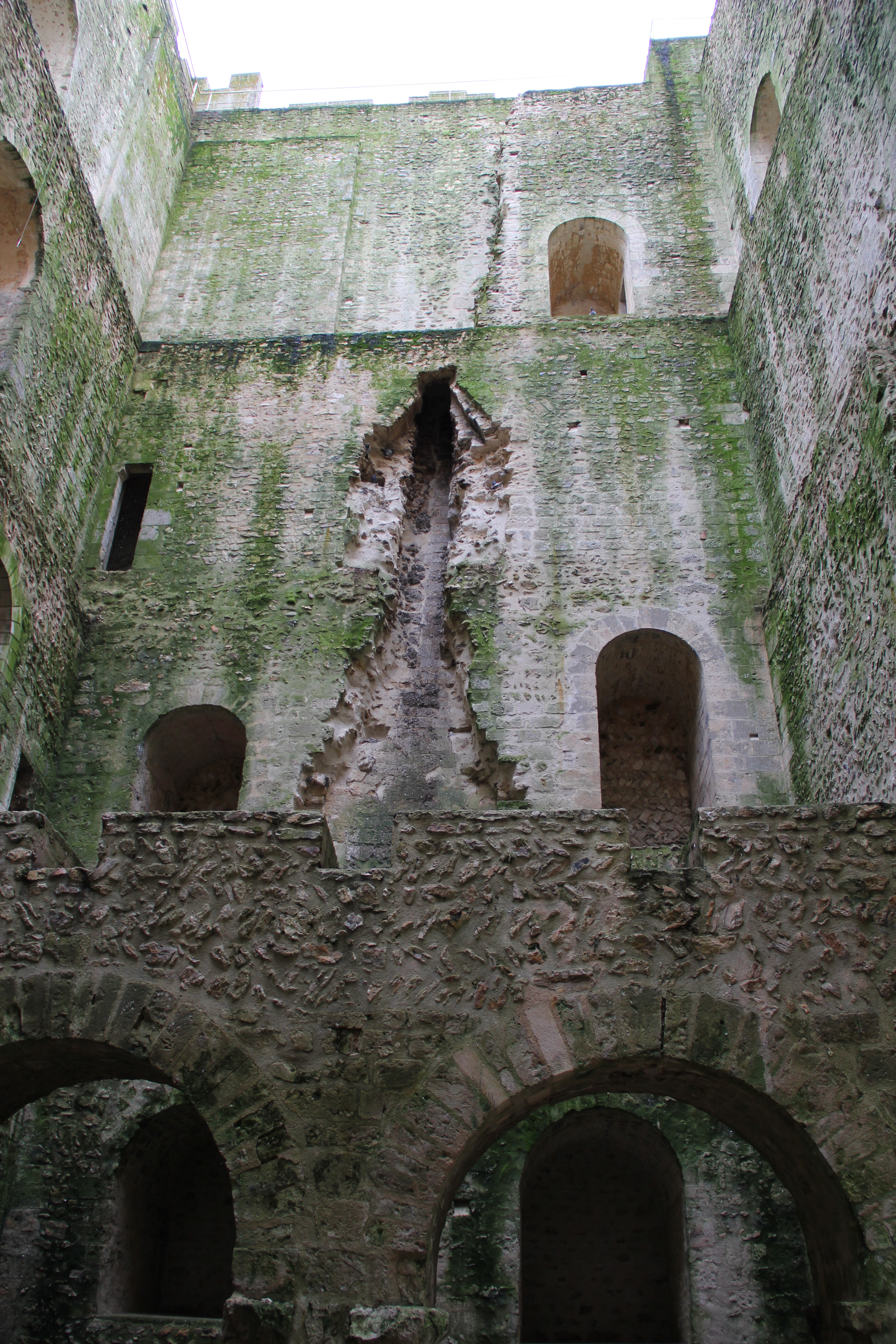
Keep

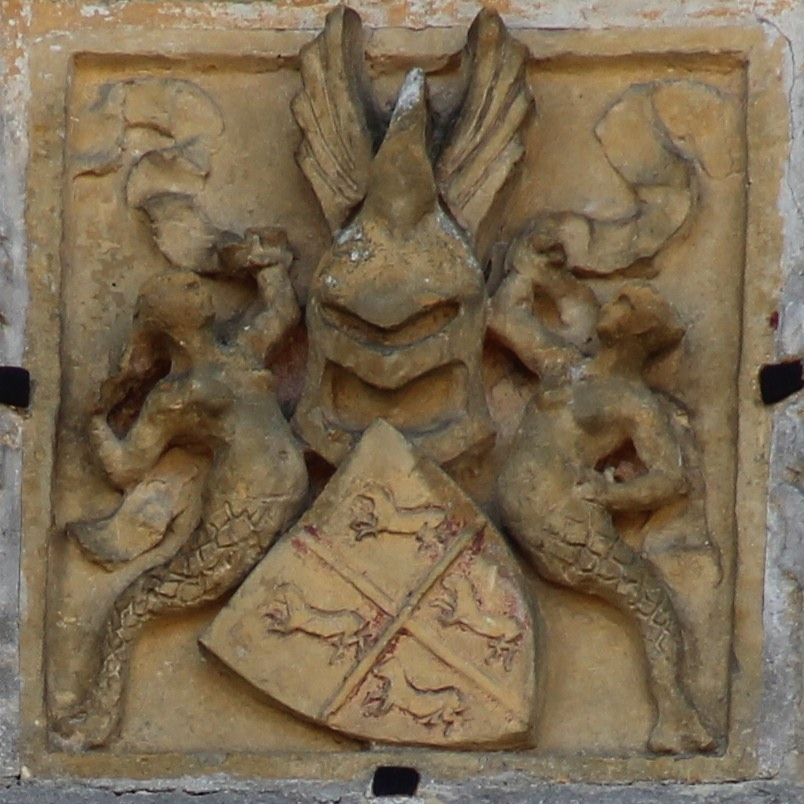
Shield

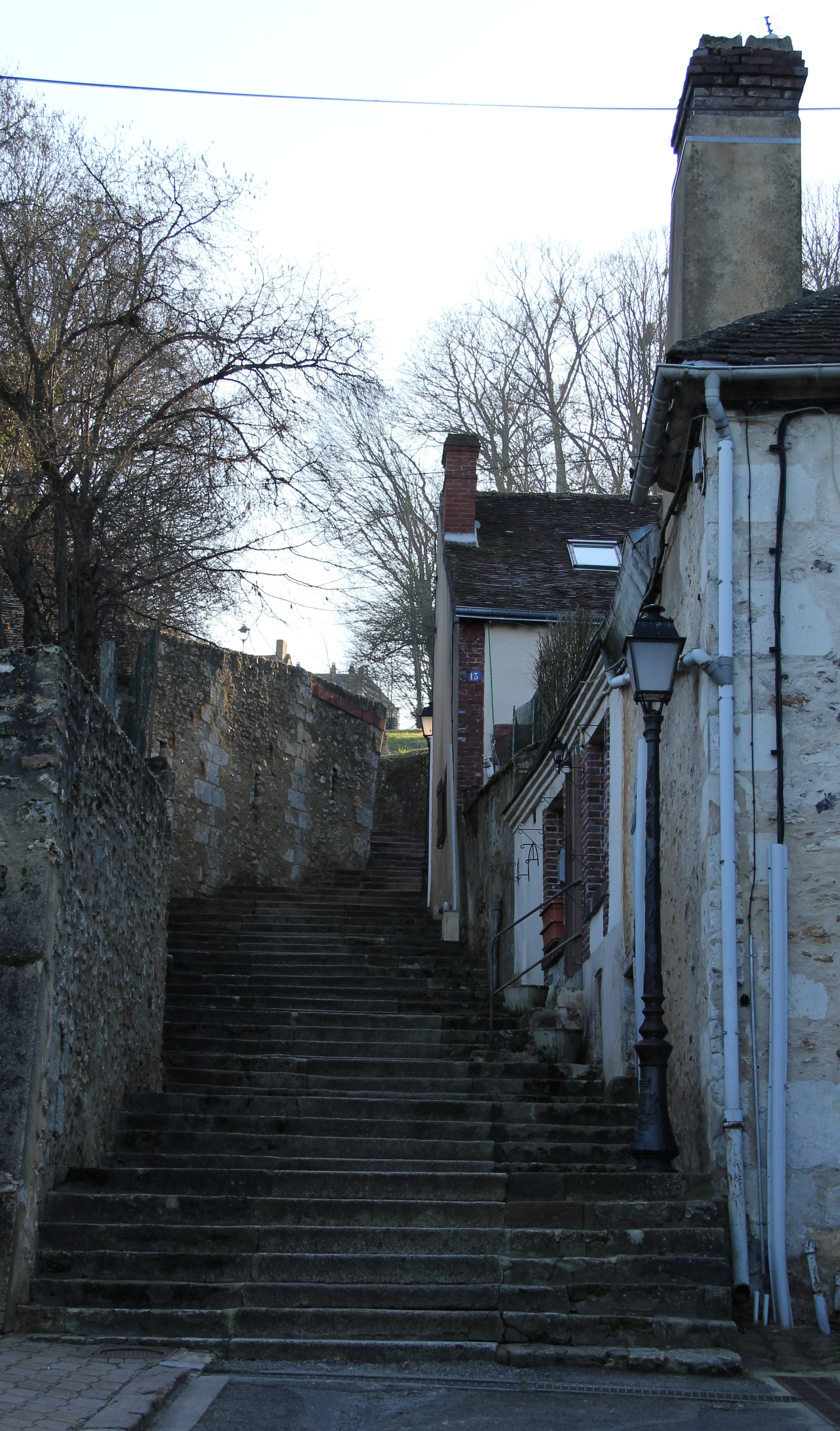
Marches Saint-Jean

== See also ==
- List of châteaux in Eure-et-Loir
- List of castles in France
