= Lignerolles, Indre =

Lignerolles
- Commune
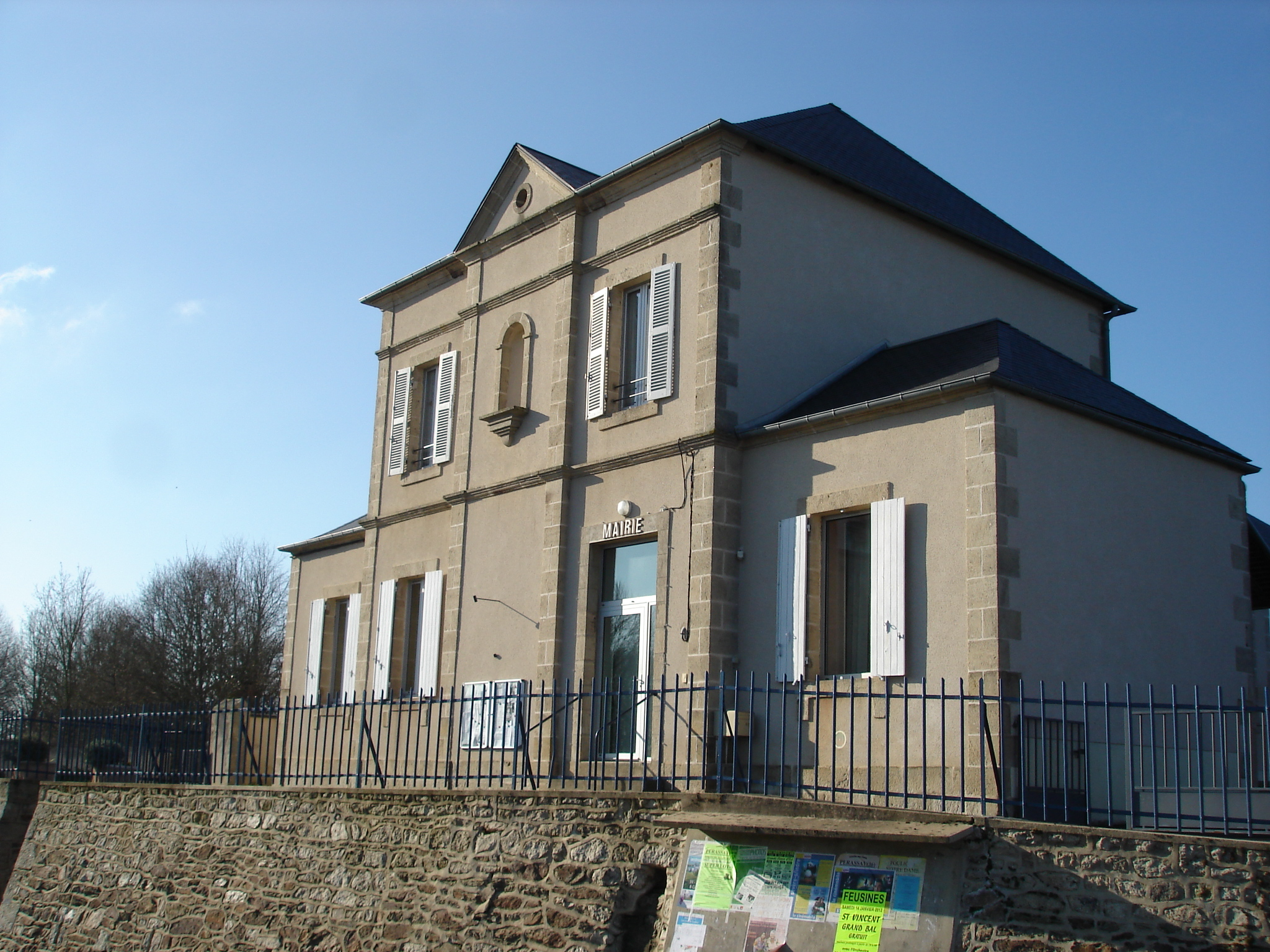
- The town hall in Lignerolles
- Location of Lignerolles
- Location within France Location within Centre-Val de Loire
- Coordinates: 46°29′48″N 2°08′41″E
- Country: France
- Region: Centre-Val de Loire
- Department: Indre
- Arrondissement: La Châtre
- Canton: La Châtre
- Intercommunality: La Châtre et Sainte-Sévère

Government
  - Mayor (2020–2026): Michel Rousseau
- Area^{1}: 13 km^{2} (5.0 sq mi)
- Elevation: 300 m (980 ft)
- Highest elevation: 410 m (1,350 ft)
- Lowest elevation: 291 m (955 ft)
- Population (2023): 117
  - Density: 9.0/km^{2} (23/sq mi)
- Time zone: UTC+01:00 (CET)
  - Summer (DST): UTC+02:00 (CEST)
- INSEE/Postal code: 36095 /36160
- ^{1} French Land Register data, which excludes lakes, ponds, glaciers > 1 km^{2} (0.386 sq mi or 247 acres) and river estuaries.

Lignerolles (French pronunciation: [liɲʁɔl]) is a commune in the Indre department in central France.

== Population ==
Historical population
Year	Pop.	±% p.a.
1968	234	—
1975	189	−3.00%
1982	166	−1.84%
1990	136	−2.46%
1999	136	+0.00%
2007	111	−2.51%
2012	113	+0.36%
2017	101	−2.22%
2023	117	+2.48%
Source: INSEE

== Sights ==
- Château de Puybardeau, a château or country house built in the 19th century by the de Maussabré family. It was used by the French Resistance during World War II.

== Personalities ==
- The Maussabré family, with famous French military chiefs along the centuries.

== See also ==
- Heugnes
- Communes of the Indre department
