= Reugny, Indre-et-Loire =

Reugny
- Commune
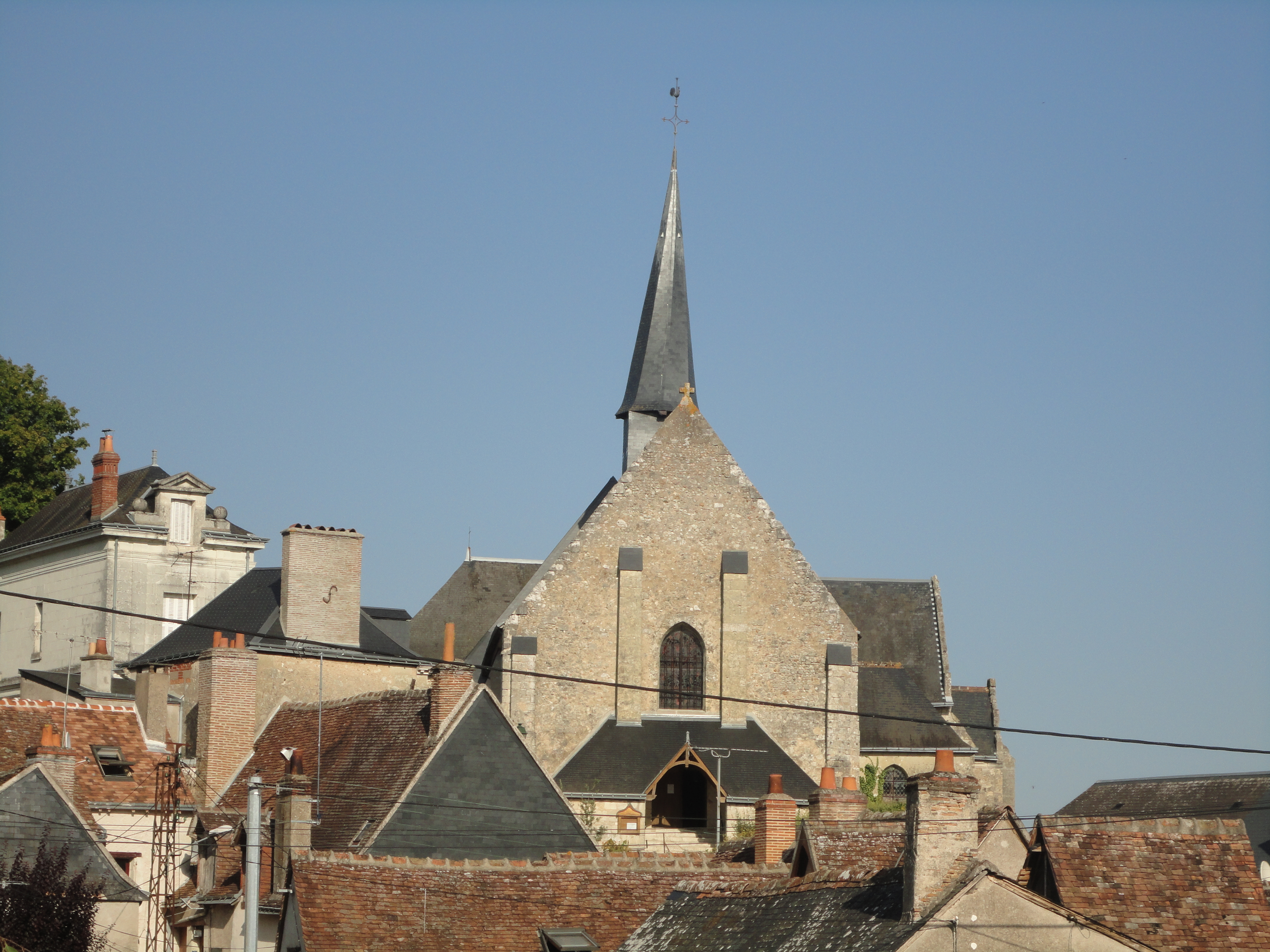
- The church in Reugny

- Coat of arms
- Location of Reugny
- Location within France Location within Centre-Val de Loire
- Coordinates: 47°28′59″N 0°53′06″E
- Country: France
- Region: Centre-Val de Loire
- Department: Indre-et-Loire
- Arrondissement: Tours
- Canton: Vouvray
- Intercommunality: Touraine-Est Vallées

Government
  - Mayor (2020–2026): Nicolas Toker
- Area^{1}: 29.72 km^{2} (11.47 sq mi)
- Highest elevation: 133 m (436 ft)
- Lowest elevation: 60 m (200 ft)
- Population (2023): 1,759
  - Density: 59.19/km^{2} (153.3/sq mi)
- Time zone: UTC+01:00 (CET)
  - Summer (DST): UTC+02:00 (CEST)
- INSEE/Postal code: 37194 /37380
- ^{1} French Land Register data, which excludes lakes, ponds, glaciers > 1 km^{2} (0.386 sq mi or 247 acres) and river estuaries.

Reugny (French pronunciation: [ʁøɲi]) is a commune in the Indre-et-Loire department in central France.

== Population ==
Historical population
Year	Pop.	±% p.a.
1968	947	—
1975	878	−1.07%
1982	1,181	+4.33%
1990	1,289	+1.10%
1999	1,416	+1.05%
2007	1,564	+1.25%
2012	1,602	+0.48%
2017	1,690	+1.08%
2023	1,759	+0.67%
Source: INSEE

== See also ==
- Communes of the Indre-et-Loire department
