= Ligny-le-Ribault =

- Commune
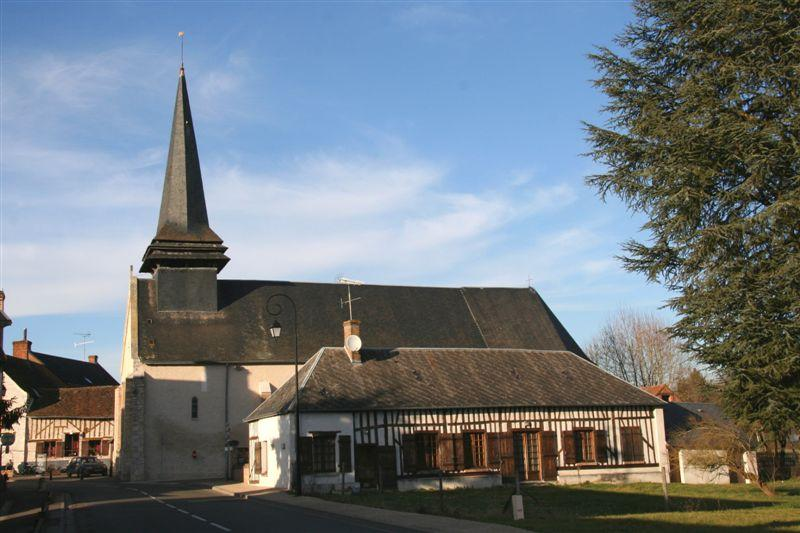
- The church in Ligny-le-Ribault

- Coat of arms
- Location of Ligny-le-Ribault
- Location within France Location within Centre-Val de Loire
- Coordinates: 47°41′09″N 1°46′58″E
- Country: France
- Region: Centre-Val de Loire
- Department: Loiret
- Arrondissement: Orléans
- Canton: La Ferté-Saint-Aubin
- Intercommunality: Portes de Sologne

Government
  - Mayor (2020–2026): Anne Durand-Gaborit
- Area^{1}: 59.21 km^{2} (22.86 sq mi)
- Highest elevation: 117 m (384 ft)
- Lowest elevation: 84 m (276 ft)
- Population (2023): 1,252
  - Density: 21.15/km^{2} (54.77/sq mi)
- Demonym: Lignois
- Time zone: UTC+01:00 (CET)
  - Summer (DST): UTC+02:00 (CEST)
- INSEE/Postal code: 45182 /45240
- Website: www.ligny-le-ribault.info
- ^{1} French Land Register data, which excludes lakes, ponds, glaciers > 1 km^{2} (0.386 sq mi or 247 acres) and river estuaries.

Ligny-le-Ribault (French pronunciation: [liɲi lə ʁibo]) is a commune in the Loiret department in north-central France.

== Population ==
Historical population
| Year | Pop. | ±% p.a. |
|---|---|---|
| 1968 | 939 | — |
| 1975 | 895 | −0.68% |
| 1982 | 960 | +1.01% |
| 1990 | 1,033 | +0.92% |
| 1999 | 1,121 | +0.91% |
| 2007 | 1,316 | +2.02% |
| 2012 | 1,295 | −0.32% |
| 2017 | 1,236 | −0.93% |
| 2023 | 1,252 | +0.21% |
Source: INSEE

== See also ==
- Communes of the Loiret department
