= Chapelle Sainte-Radegonde =

Chapel in Centre-Val de Loire, France

Coordinates: 47.1685°N 0.2537°E

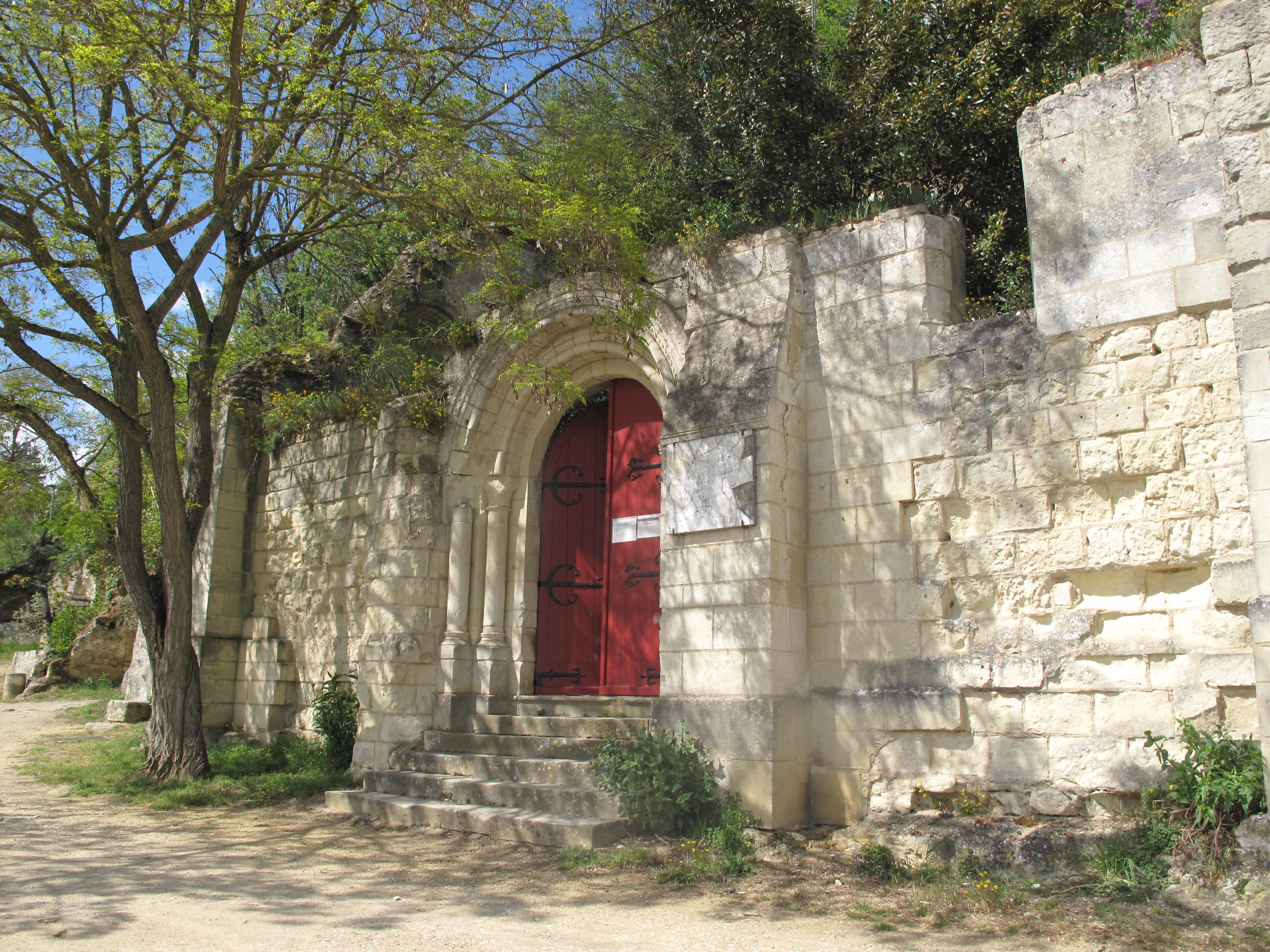
- Entrance to the chapel.

Religion
- District: Chinon
- Region: Indre-et-Loire

Location
- Country: France
- Interactive map of Chapelle Sainte-Radegonde

Architecture
- Completed: 12th century.

The Chapelle Sainte-Radegonde or Sainte-Radegonde Chapel is an underground structure, a former oratory converted into a chapel, on the slope of the Sainte-Radegonde hill, east of the historic town center of Chinon, in the French department of Indre-et-Loire in the Centre-Val de Loire region.

The site has probably been known since antiquity as a well whose waters were reputed to be miraculous; tradition has it that the hermit Jean le Reclus was buried there; the main developments leading to the creation of a proper chapel, however, date back to the 11th or 12th century. The chapel owes its name to Radegonde de Poitiers, who is said to have met Jean on several occasions. The walls are decorated with several murals from different periods and in varying states of preservation; one of them, probably depicting a hunting scene, dates from the end of the 11th century. The precise identity of the figures in this painting is still debated, but it seems likely that they are several members of the House of Plantagenet.

The abandoned chapel was sold as bien national during the French Revolution. After being used as a home, along with the adjoining caves, and having had several successive owners, it has belonged to the town of Chinon since 1957. The Musée des Arts et Traditions Populaires du Chinonais has been housed here since 1966. The "Royal Hunt" mural was discovered by chance in 1964, leading to its classification as a monument historique in 1967, along with the rest of the chapel.

== Location ==
The underground site is located on the hillside overlooking the Vienne valley on its right bank, to the east of the town of Chinon, at an altitude of around 77 metres (253 ft); the top of the hillside and the bed of the Vienne are at altitudes of 94 metres (308 ft) and 30 metres (98 ft) respectively. The various cavities are dug into the Upper Turonian yellow tuffeau, a sedimentary rock that has been widely exploited in the middle Loire Valley and its tributaries for construction since Antiquity.

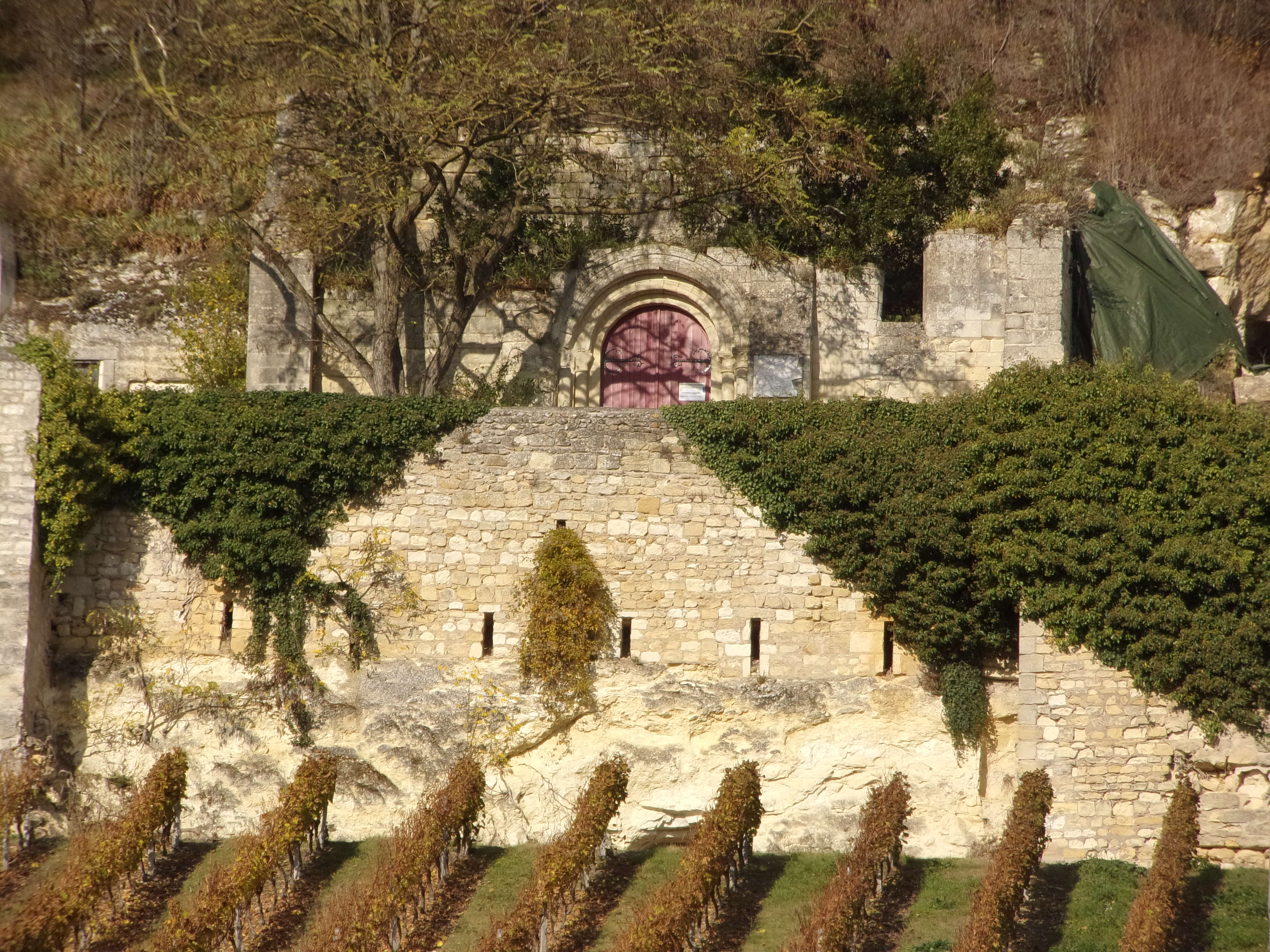
View from the lower town.

The chapel is served by Rue du Pitoche and Rue du Coteau de Sainte-Radegonde, which rise gradually eastward on the hillside from Chinon's Collegiate Church of Saint-Mexme, just over 600 metres (2,000 ft) as the crow flies from the chapel. This succession of streets, perhaps an ancient medieval or even ancient road leading to the Chinon forest, runs alongside the eaves wall of the monument; it also provides access to the many underground dwellings on its edge.

== History ==
=== Ancient occupation site ===
The Sainte-Radegonde site in Chinon appears to have been occupied as early as the Hallstatt period, as evidenced by the remains of "surface" settlements and pottery shards found on the hillside above the chapel.

During Antiquity and the Paleo-Christian period, tradition has it that the site was a place of pagan worship around a well dug into the rock behind the present-day chapel; this well and its fittings, which still exist, may indeed have been built in Antiquity or in Merovingian times. Curative virtues were attributed to the water drawn from the well on the night of St. John's Day (summer solstice), but this reference probably came later, in connection with the occupation of the site by a hermit named Jean.

=== Christian hermitage ===
According to the tradition reported by Grégoire de Tours (Liber in Gloria Confessorum, chap. XXIII), the site was Christianized in the 5th century, perhaps around 530, when Jean le Reclus, a hermit from the British Isles also known as the priest Jean, settled in a cave after having spent some time with the monks of Saint-Mexme. The exact location of his hermitage, on the site of the future chapel or in another place, probably nearby, is not known with certainty - there are many caves in this part of the hillside, whose morphology has changed considerably over the centuries, as a result of development and landslides; historians in favor of the first hypothesis base themselves on the topography of the site, in line with the eremitical lifestyle of the time, while those in favor of the second solution rely on the writings of Gregory of Tours, whose account suggests a distinction between the two sites, the hermit's cell being located to the west of the chapel housing his burial site.

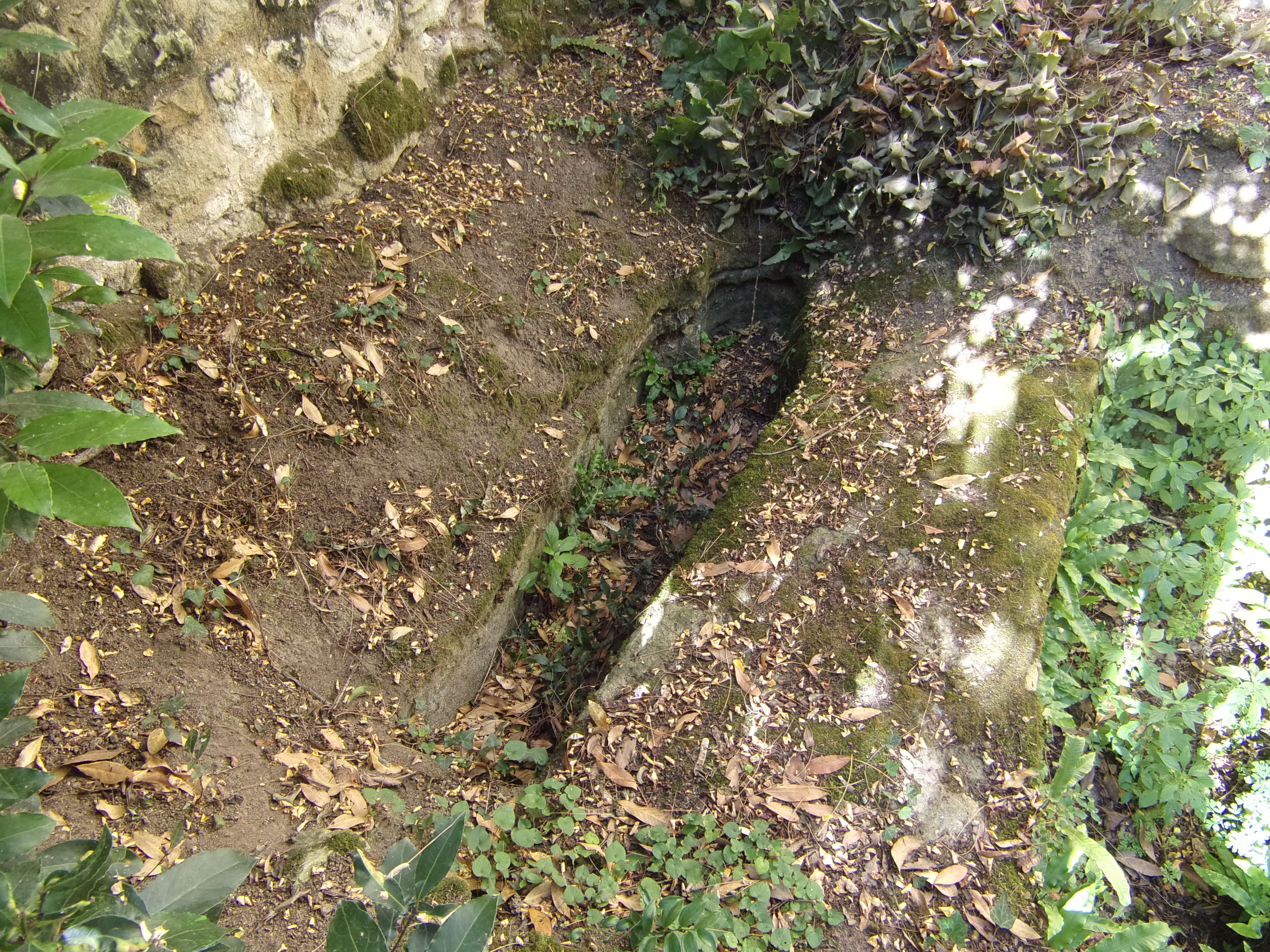
Medieval burial site in the ground.

According to chronicles, the hermit Jean acquired a great reputation for wisdom; he was even consulted by Saint Radegonde, who stopped off in Chinon to visit him on several occasions, notably on her way to Poitiers to found the Sainte-Croix de Poitiers abbey, which explains the chapel's dedication. Tradition has it that, from the time of Jean's death, the oratory became a burial place for other hermits who followed her example and retreated to the same spot. Among the burials found in the floor of the southern nave, those that can be dated with certainty date back to the late Middle Ages, and are characterized by the presence of cephalic alveoli designed to hold the head of the deceased, an arrangement that developed during this period.

During the Late Roman Empire and the High Middle Ages, many pagan cult sites, including those associated with springs, were Christianized within or near churches or chapels, if they were not destroyed. The Sainte-Radegonde chapel, which incorporates a pagan cult site into a Christian building, could be yet another example of these "appropriations".

=== Furnished chapel ===
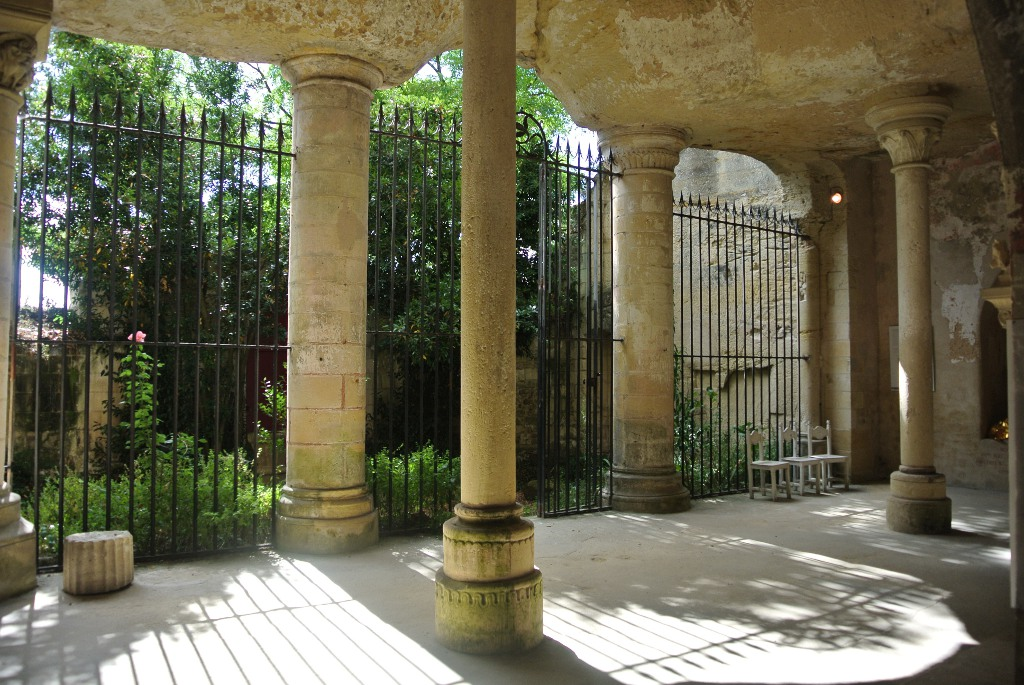
Underground nave looking south.

Plan of the chapel.

It's not clear when the building changed from a simple oratory to a chapel welcoming pilgrims: Gregory of Tours mentions miracles, but makes no mention of pilgrimages. Sainte-Radegonde took on its "modern" configuration in the 11th or early 12th century. A nave was dug directly into the rock, and reinforced by two monolithic columns when the vault was raised.

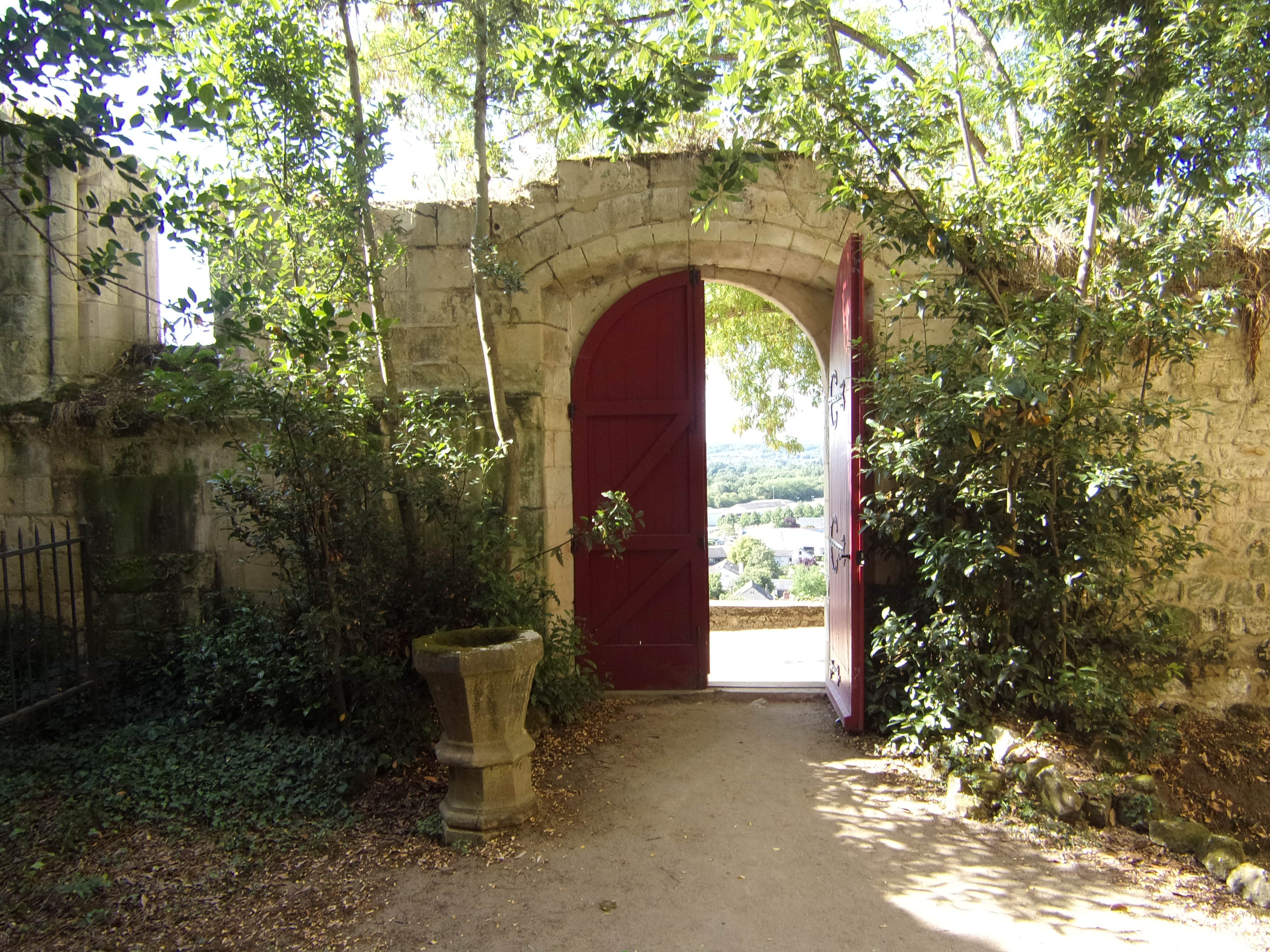
Open-air nave looking south.

Perhaps at the end of the 11th or beginning of the 13th century, the vault partially collapsed on the south side, leaving the building unable to accommodate the large number of worshippers and pilgrims. A second nave was then built, bricked up on the south side and partially on the west and east, covered by a frame and a single-pitch roof, which disappeared during the Revolution: this space has since been transformed into a garden; a medieval colonnade and a modern gate separate it from the troglodytic nave. The paintings discovered in the 20th century on the northern wall of the troglodytic nave probably date from this major renovation campaign.

The Sainte-Radegonde chapel is first mentioned in written sources in 1269 as an ecclesia, but it was Rabelais who, in Le Tiers Livre (1546), first linked the existence of the chapel to the tradition of Jean le Reclus.

In 1388–1402, chronicles record the burial of local personalities in the chapel, including two nuns and a notable Chinonite who became a hermit after a pilgrimage to Jerusalem.

=== Despoiling, restoring, protecting ===
In 1563, during the Wars of Religion, the chapel was plundered, the graves desecrated and the relics of Saint John destroyed. Twenty years later, it was used as lodgings for carers and the families of patients suffering from an epidemic of plague or typhoid fever then raging in Touraine. The chapel was restored in the seventeenth century: around 1643, during the time of Canon Louis Breton, who lived in the underground presbytery near the chapel, a new altar was inaugurated in the southern apse and a new cycle of paintings, recounting the story of Saint Radegonde and whose scenes are accompanied by a legend, was created on the walls and vault of the eastern chapel.

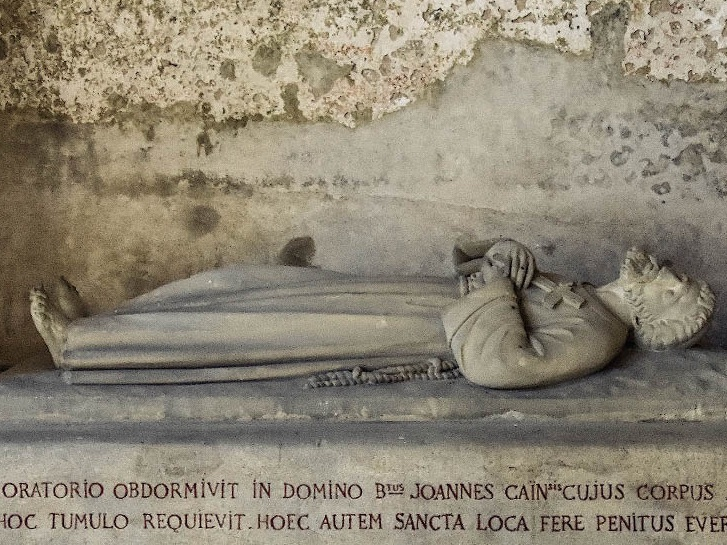
Recumbent statue of hermit Jean

Disused during the French Revolution, the chapel was sold as bien national in 1793 and transformed, along with adjoining cavities to the west, into four different dwellings. The chapel itself retains traces of chimney flues dug into the corners of its vault. This situation, punctuated by various changes of ownership, lasted for almost a century; during this period, and on the initiative of the owners, excavations took place in an attempt to recover bones and furniture from the various tombs.

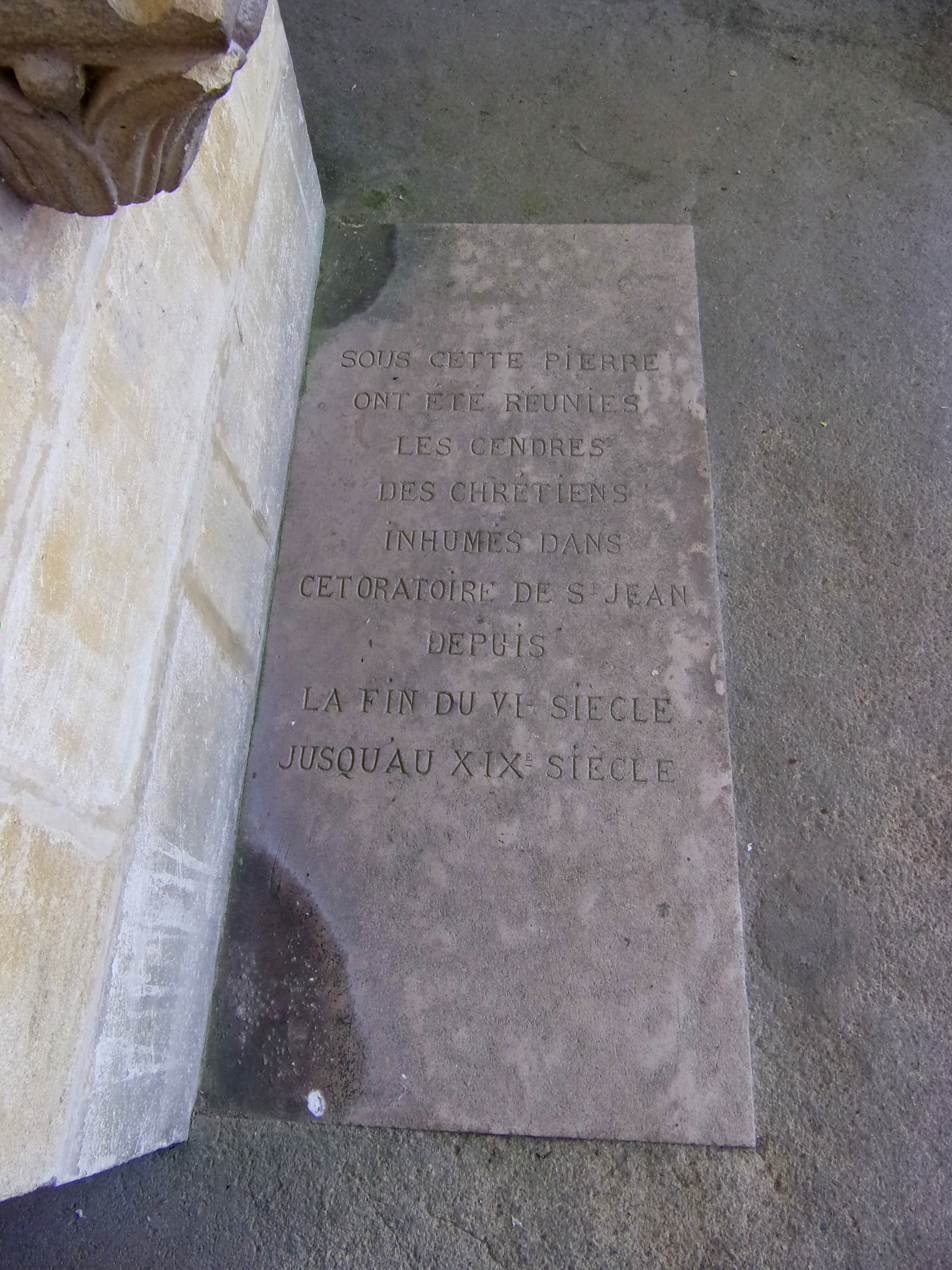
Ossuary.

In the winter of 1878, the site was bought by Élisabeth Charre, a wealthy woman from Chinon, who set herself the goal of restoring the site and returning it to religious use, which she did the following year. The following year saw the completion of the recumbent statue of hermit Jean (completed on August 6, 1879), the furnishings (altars and statues) and the paintings in the apse depicting Christ in glory surrounded by the tetramorph, as well as the restoration of other paintings, including those dating from the 17th century. In the nineteenth century, as part of the various restructuring and restoration work carried out on the building, an ossuary was built in the troglodytic nave to house the ashes of previous burials.

At the beginning of the 20th century, two masses were celebrated annually in the chapel, on the feast of Saint-Jean (June 24) and Sainte-Radegonde (August 13). In 1956, the last private owner of the site put it up for sale. The following year, the site was bought by the town of Chinon, which entrusted its management to the local learned society, Les Amis du Vieux Chinon. In the course of the clearing, cleaning and restoration work carried out by this society from 1960 onwards, in 1964 they discovered the painting of the "Royal Hunt" hidden under several layers of whitewash, and the well filled in with 19th-century garbage. In 1966, the Musée des Arts et Traditions Populaires du Chinonais was set up on the site. The chapel and all its murals were listed as a monument historique in 1967. The painting of the "Royal Hunt" was restored for the first time in 1969. Following surveys of all the paintings in 2006, the "Royal Hunt" was cleaned and consolidated in 2008, while the paintings in the two chapels were restored in 2011. In 2019, studies will be carried out to determine when the "chasse royale" was painted and the technique used, including carbon 14. In the 21st century, the chapel is open to the public during the summer months and on European Heritage Days.

== Architecture ==
=== Chapel proper ===
The chapel itself has two naves. It is linked by an ambulatory to the staircase leading to the well, as well as to other cavities to the north and west.

The northernmost of the aisles, entirely troglodytic, is supported by two monolithic pillars surmounted by Corinthian capitals. In its western section, at the presumed site of his tomb, is a recumbent statue of Saint Jean-le-Reclus with the inscription "Il s'est endormi dans le Seigneur" ("He has fallen asleep in the Lord"); the painting of the "Royal Hunt" can be found on the part of the north wall adjacent to this monument. To the east, an apse with a semi-dome vault painted in the 19th century houses an altar. Two chapels open onto the north wall, one to the west near the tomb and the other to the east near the apse. Both feature a small altar against the eastern wall.

The southern nave, now open to the sky, is separated from the previous one by a colonnade and a grid. Like the troglodytic nave, it has a semicircular apse at its eastern end - temporarily walled up in the 17th century - but does not appear to be decorated with paintings. In its south-western corner, two burials dug side-by-side into the rock are visible, in which the bodies were placed head to the west and feet to the east. The chapel's eastern and western walls are almost exclusively carved in rock; only the south wall and the half-gables supporting the single-pitch roof are built in large tufa stone units.

Access to the chapel from the outside is via a Romanesque centring portal in the middle of the south gutter wall, acting as a façade. This portal is framed by two massive buttresses that reinforce the wall structure. On the western gable, a door and a walled Romanesque bay are still discernible.

Access to the well and adjoining cavities from inside the chapel is via a vaulted ambulatory in the northeast corner of the troglodytic nave at the back of the east chapel. Merovingian sarcophagi and statues from the collections of the Société d'histoire de Chinon Vienne et Loire are on display in the underground nave.

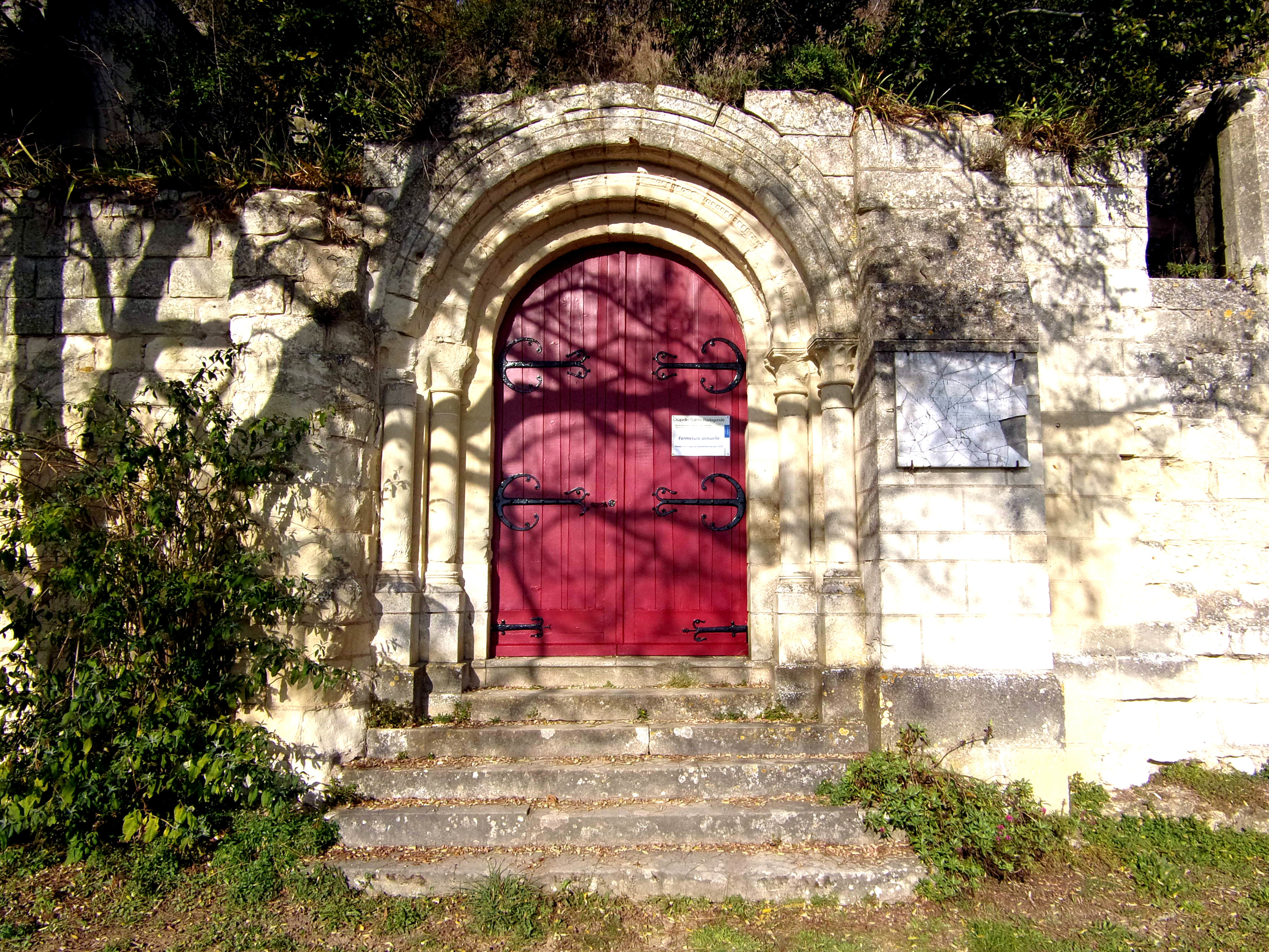
Entrance gate.

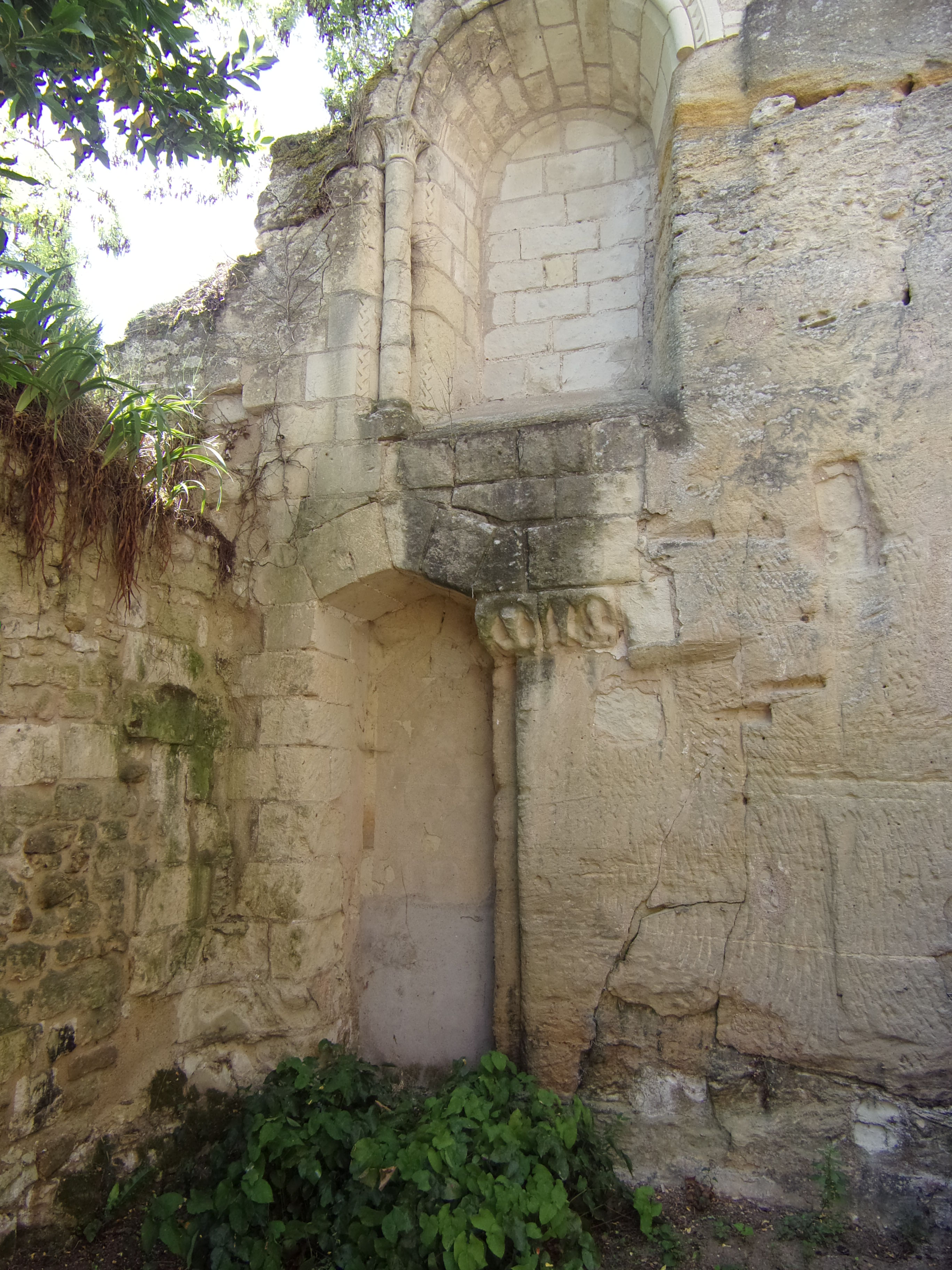
Walled bays in the open-air nave

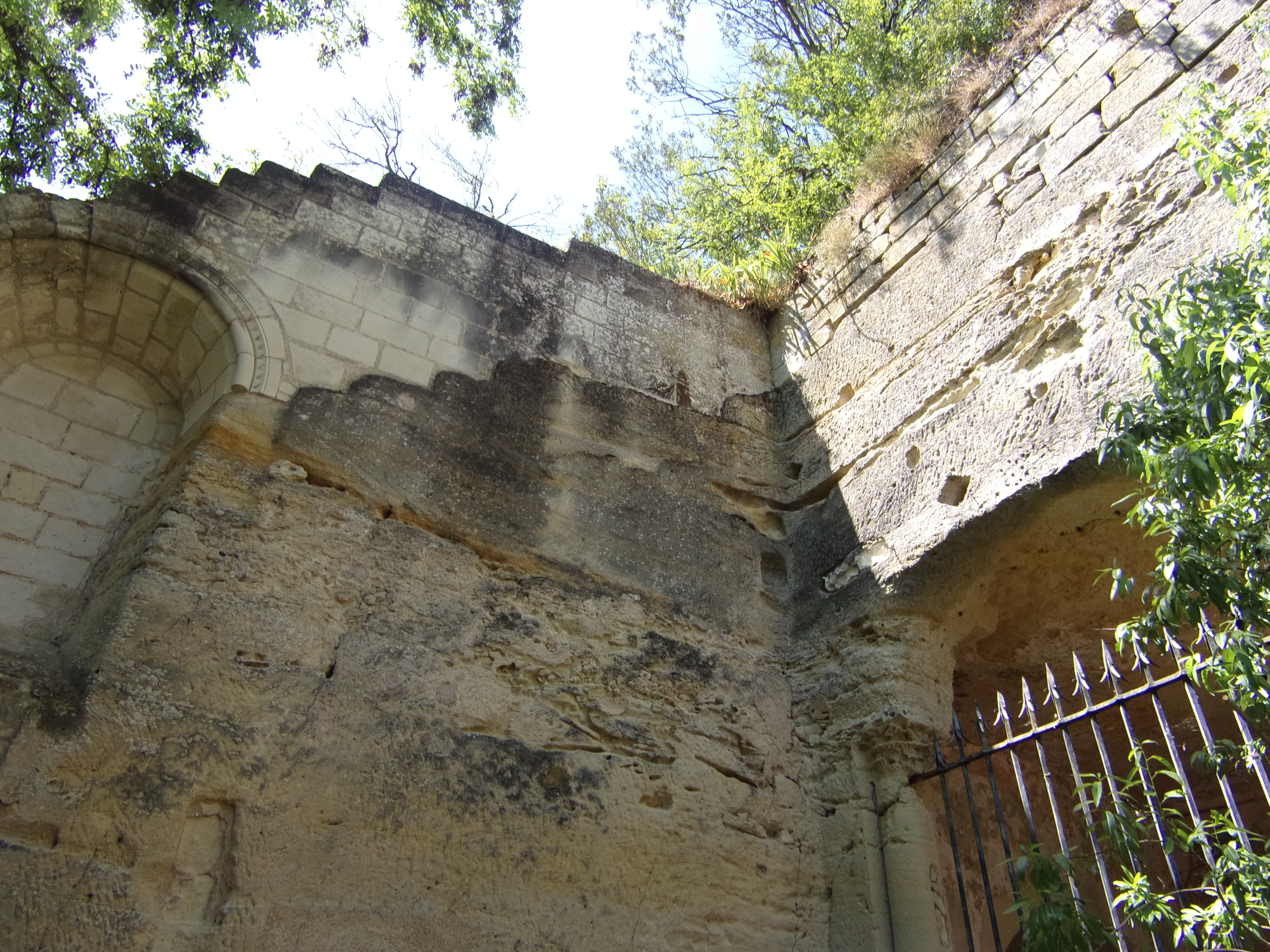
Northwest corner of the open nave.

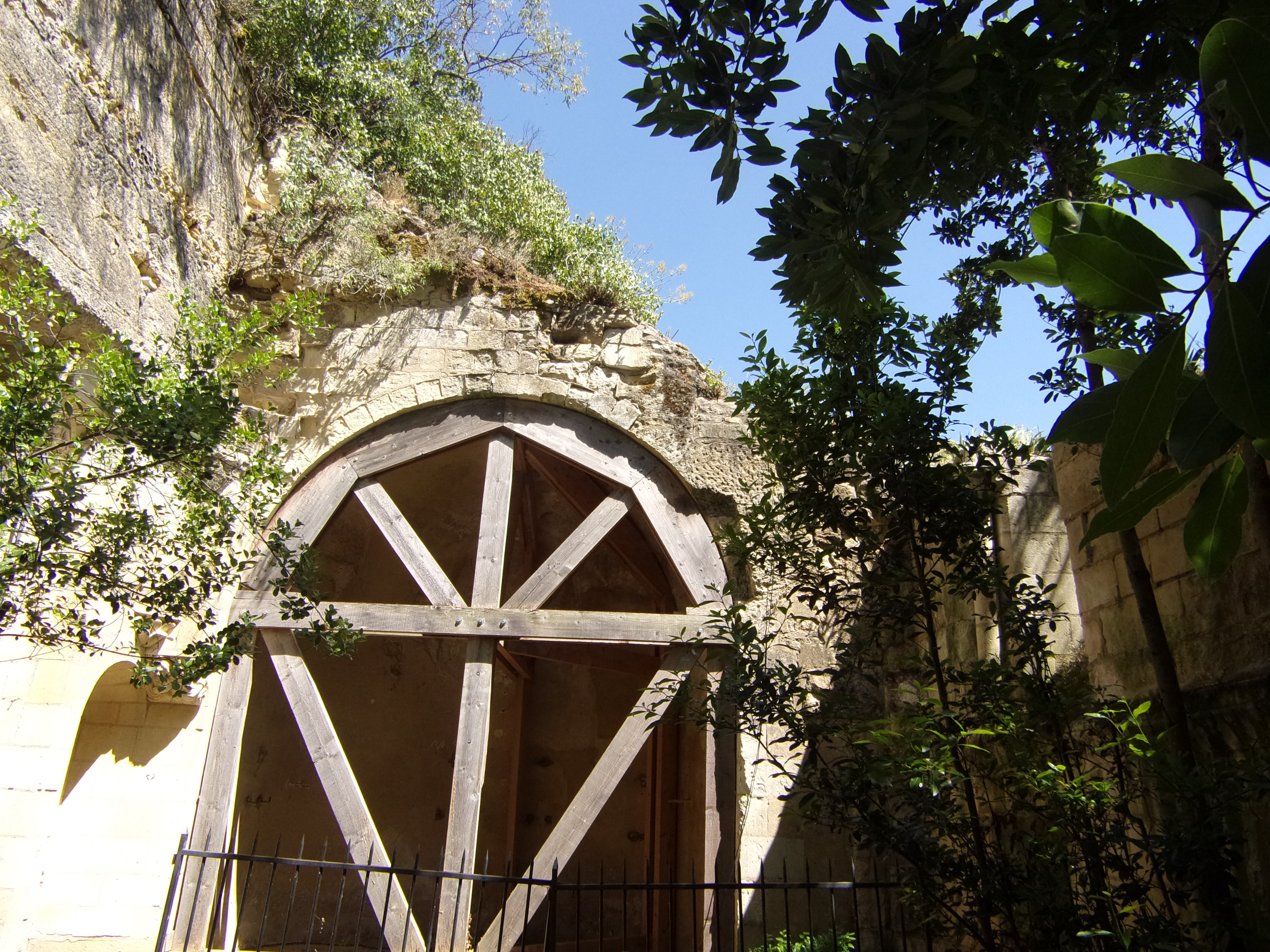
Open-air nave apse.

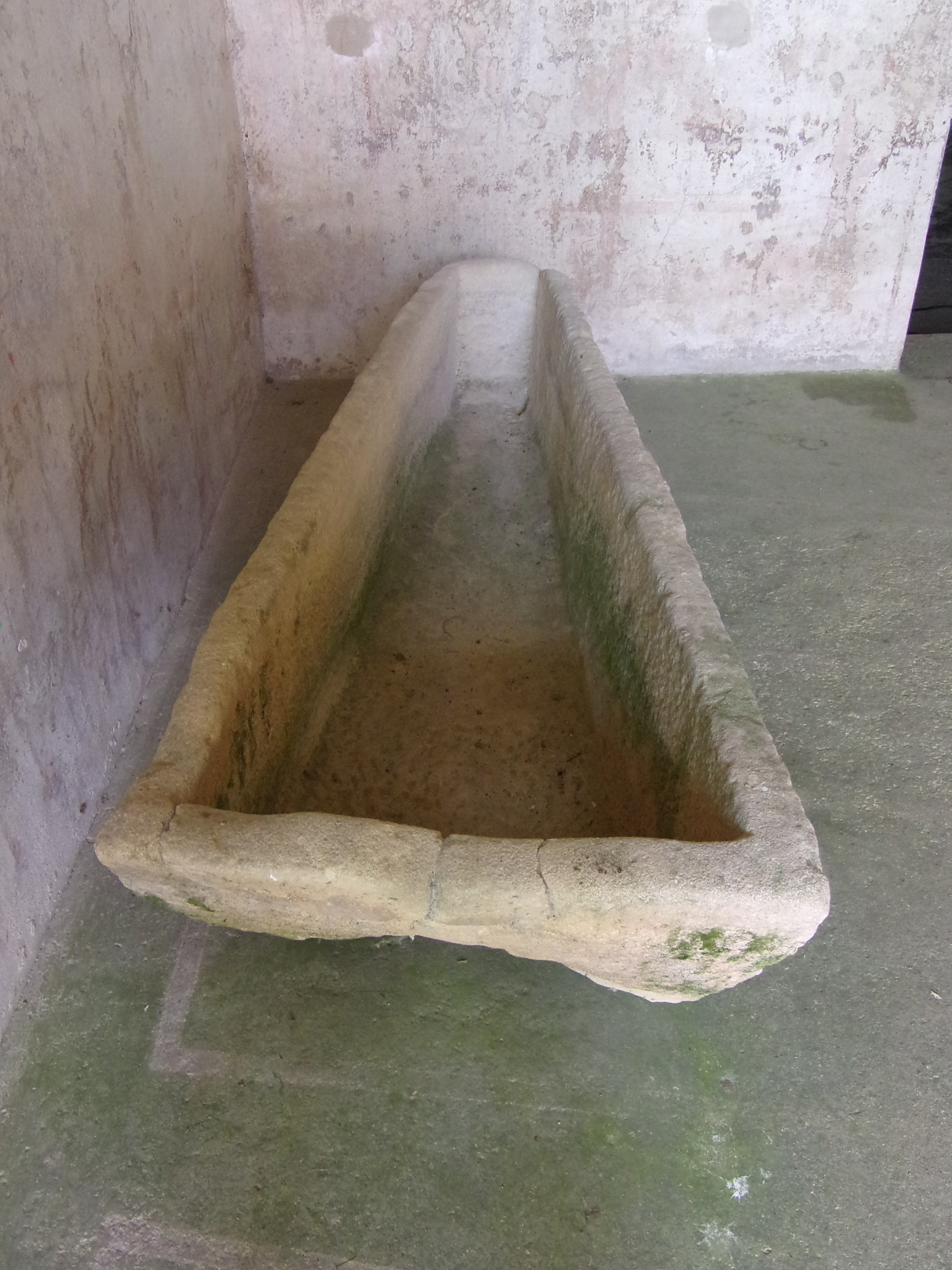
Sarcophagus exposed in the chapel.

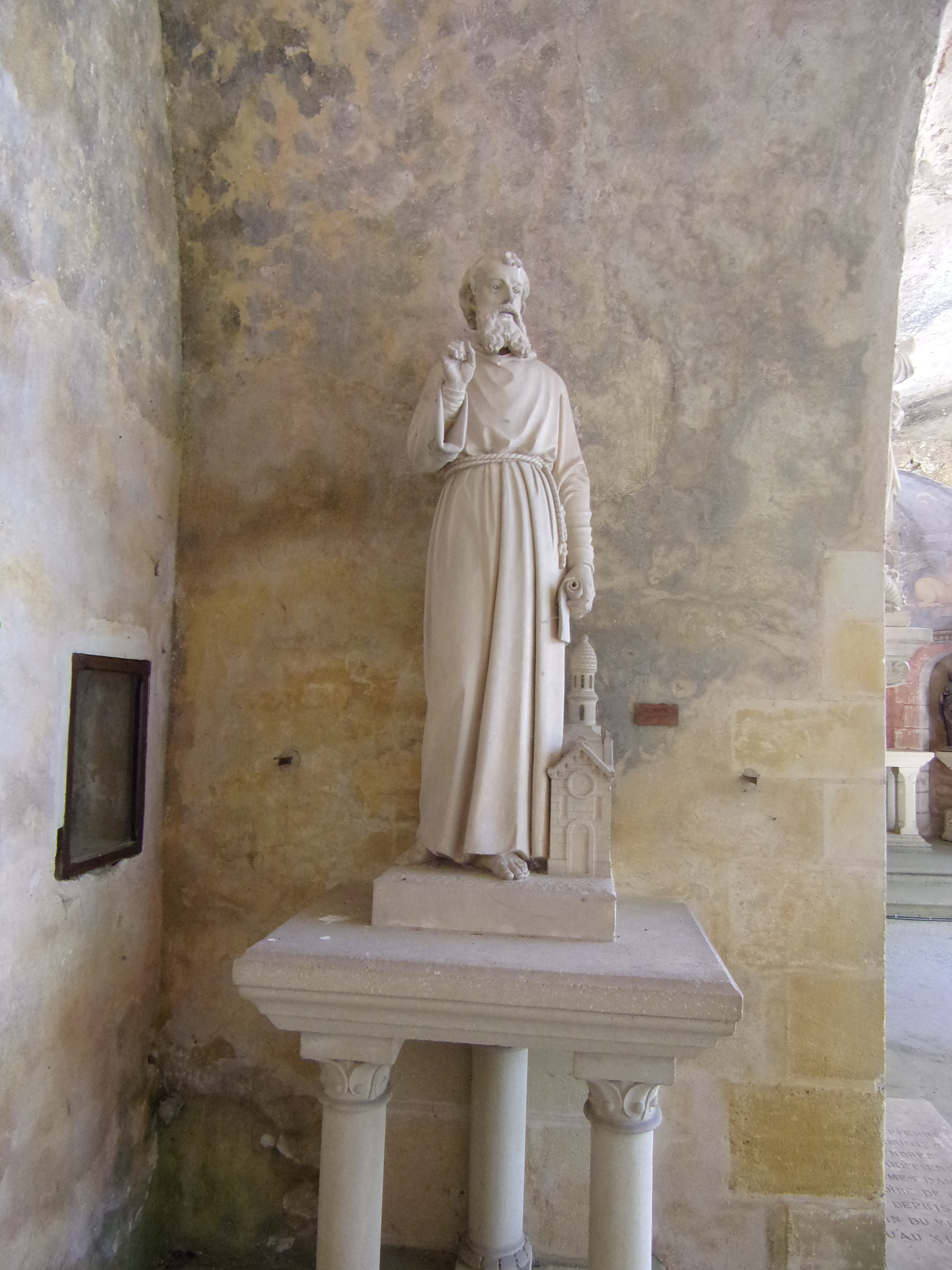
Statue of Saint Mexme in chapel.

=== Shafts and ancillary cavities ===
To the north-west of the chapel, a steep staircase with three flights of steps descends to the north, with a drop of some fifteen metres. It leads to a short vaulted corridor at the end of which is the well and the basin that collects its water. The water table that feeds this basin and the Chinon area (Seno-Turonian) seems to be subject to sudden variations in level, which may have contributed to the miraculous reputation of the well, whose water would only grant its favors to those it deemed worthy.

To the north and west of the chapel, two sets of galleries linked by passages cut into the rock and partially partitioned by masonry walls formed two separate, entirely troglodytic dwellings in the 19th century, each with its own entrance and front windows.

As part of the Musée des Arts et Traditions Populaires du Chinonais, walnut oil presses from the 18th century and a variety of everyday objects are on display in the part of the complex formerly used as dwellings, which also includes a former bread oven.

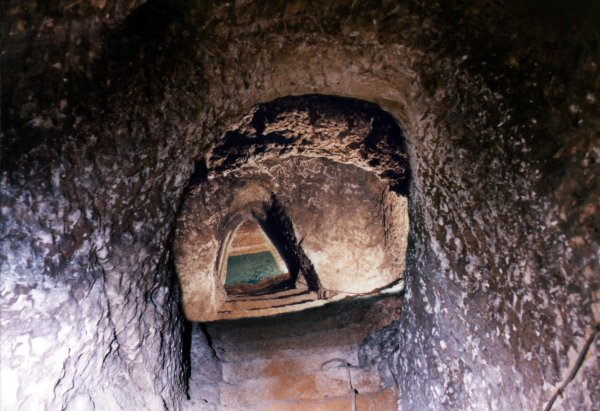
Sacred well.

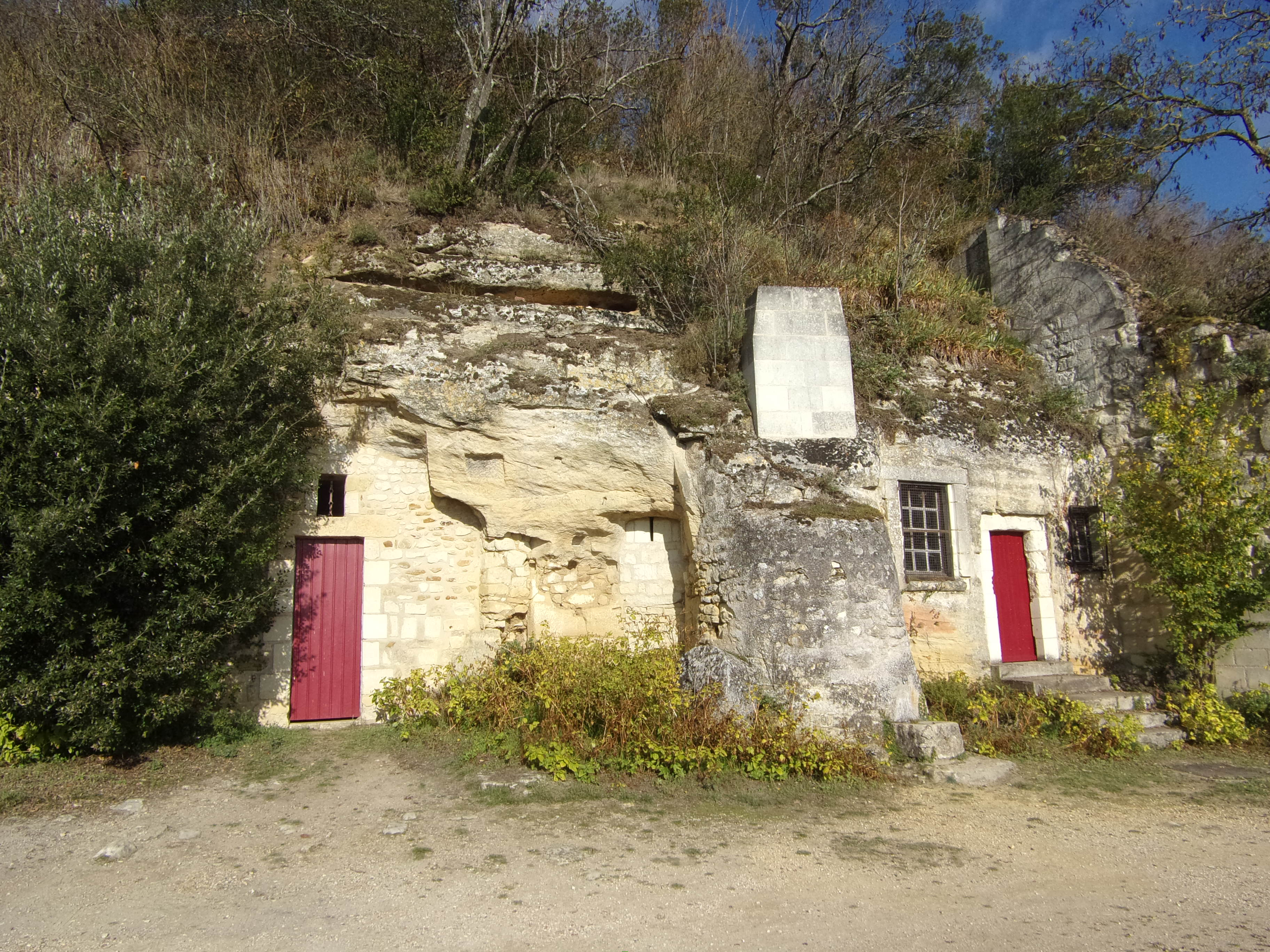
Entrance to underground dwellings

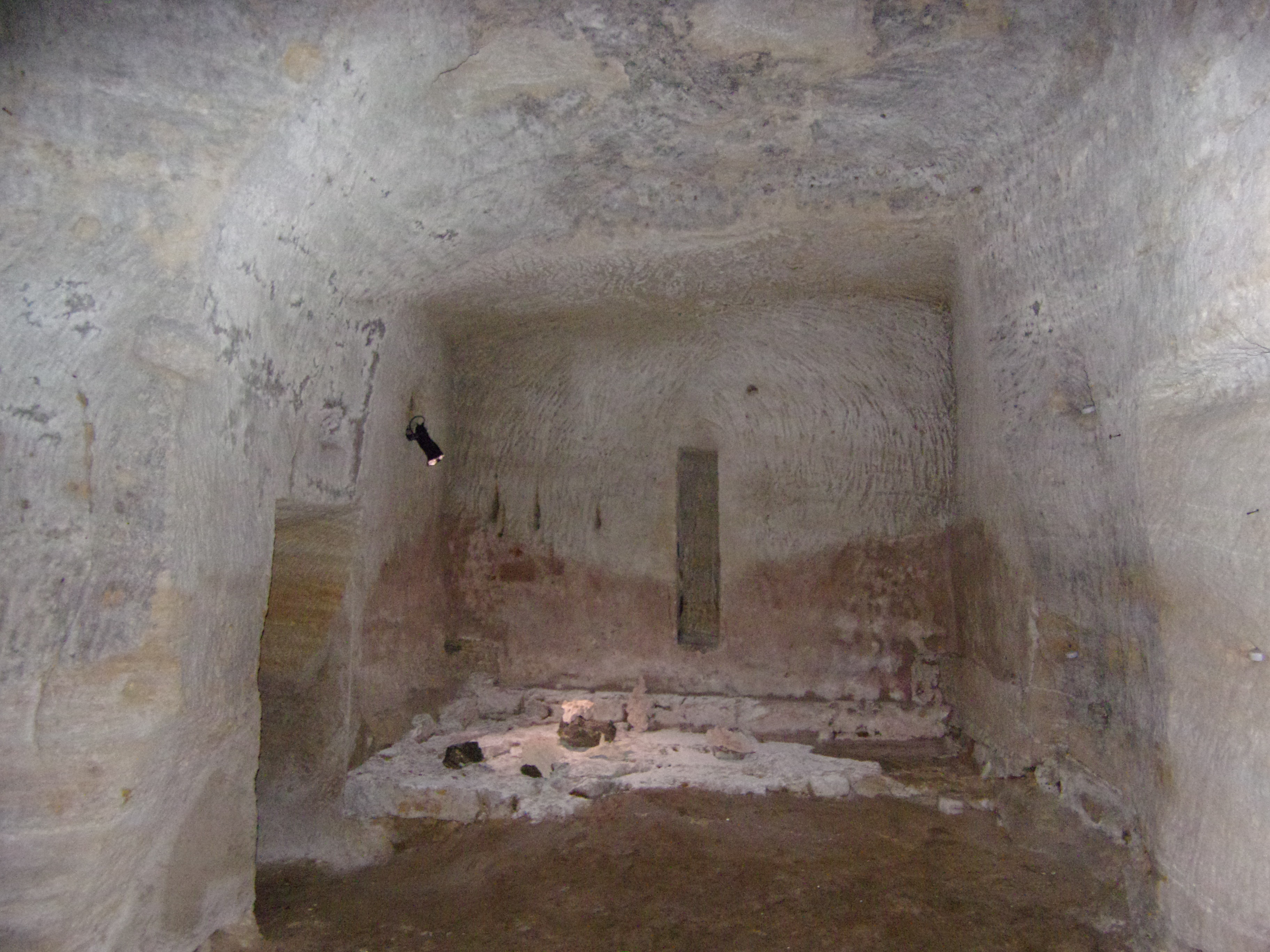
Interior of an underground dwelling.

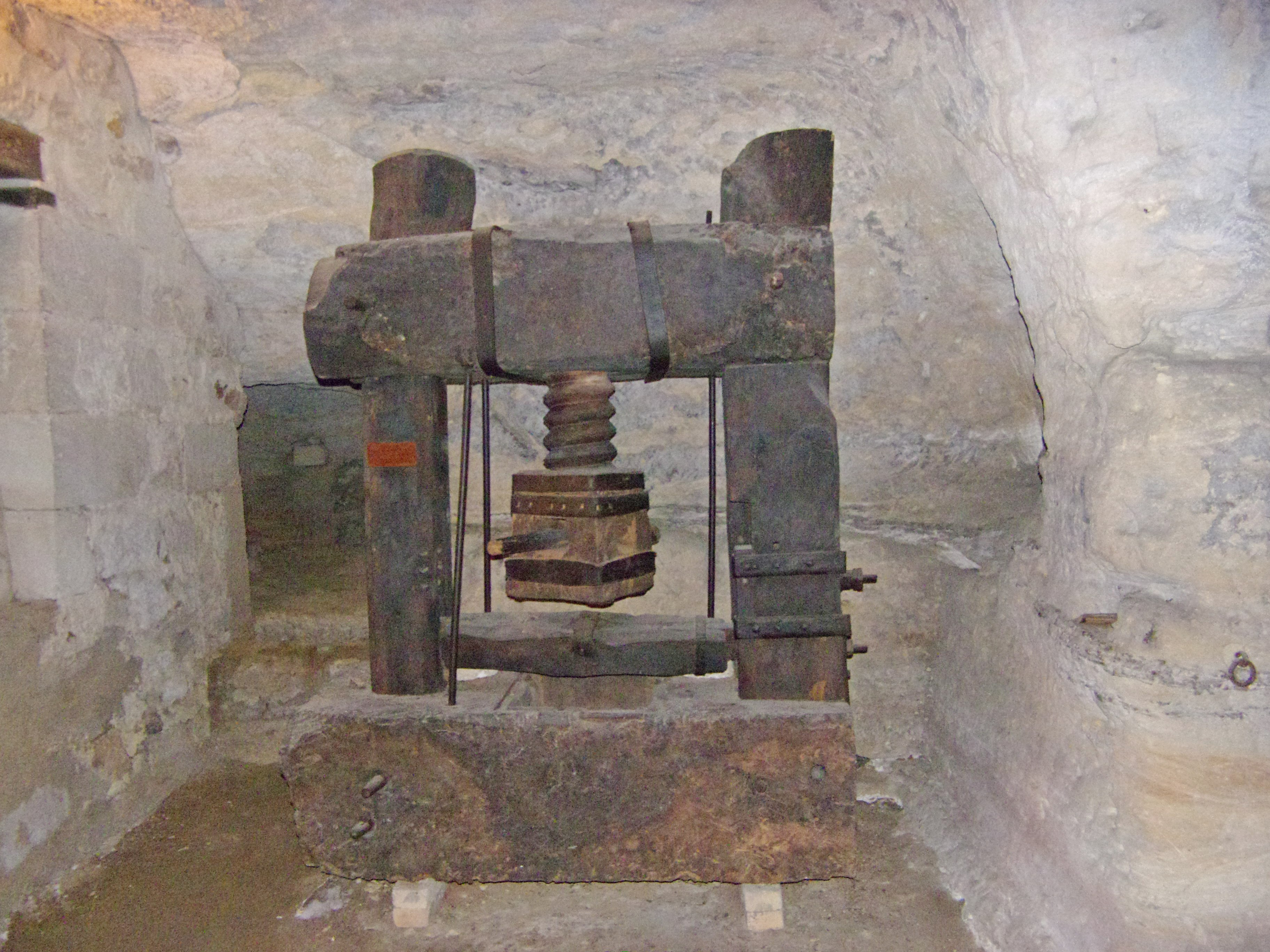
Walnut oil press.

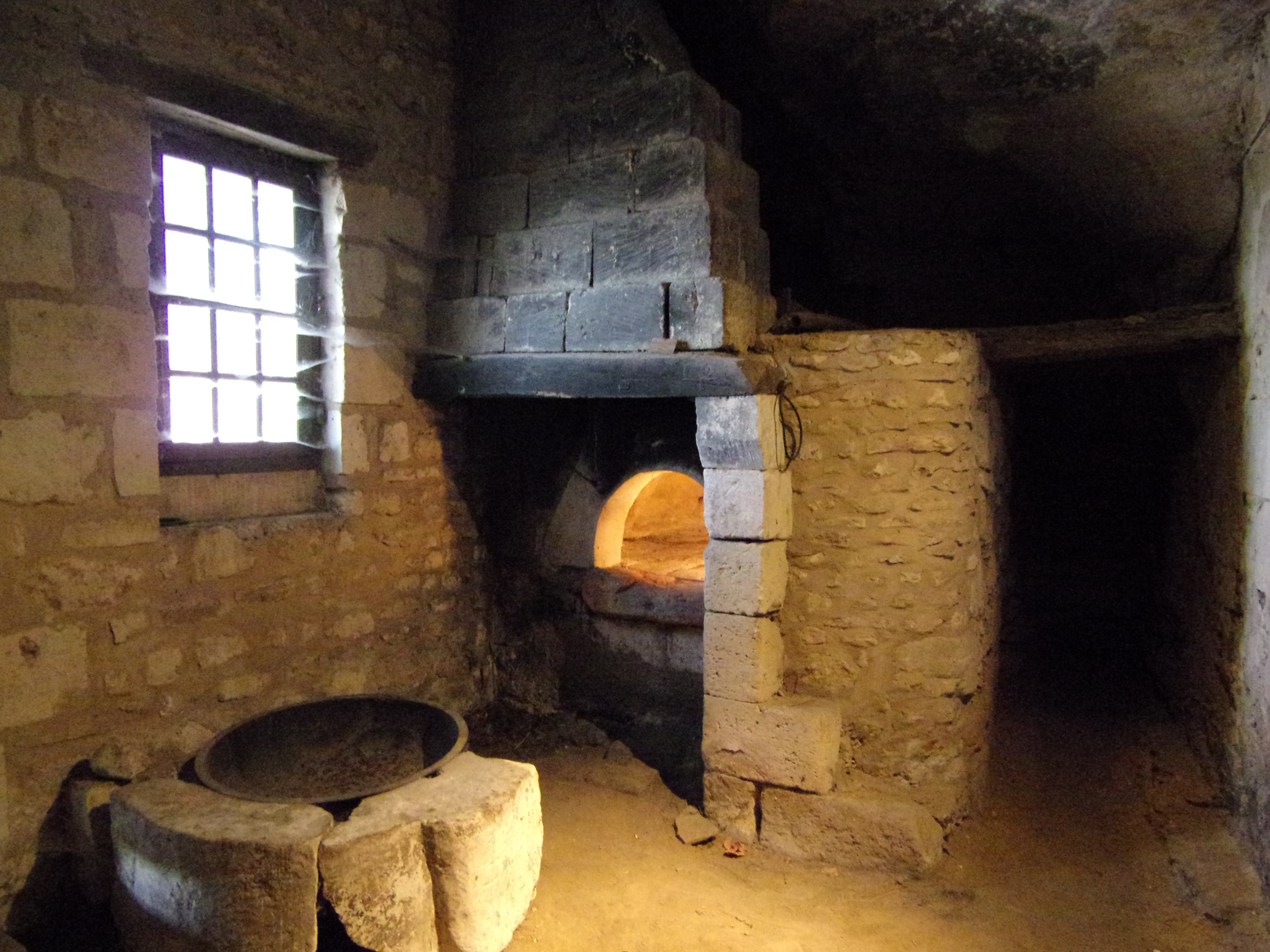
Underground dwelling and bread oven.

== Mural paintings ==
The underground nave was painted at various times, in several places in the northern aisle. Eight campaigns - some of which may have been contemporary, but without any certainty - have been identified, ranging from the 11th to the 19th century, with decorations sometimes overlapping. In the 21st century, their state of preservation is highly variable, although some of them have been restored. It is also very likely that the decorations were originally much more extensive, covering walls and vaults on which they have now disappeared.

=== "The Royal Hunt" ===
==== Description ====
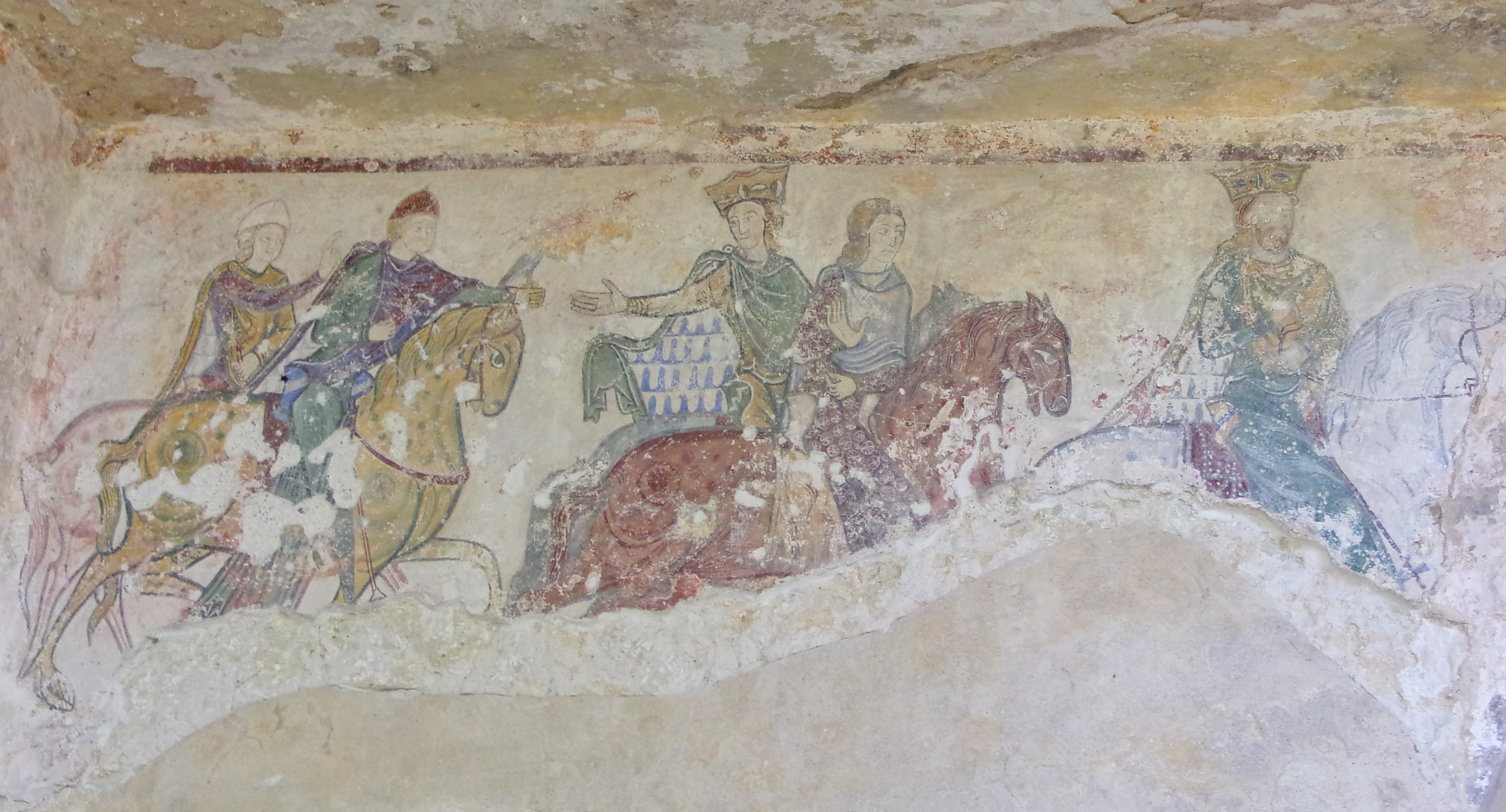
Painting of the "royal hunt".

The most extensively studied and discussed element of the chapel's decoration, a painting located at the top of the north wall of the troglodytic nave, discovered in August 1964, measures 2.15 m long by 1.15 m high. It depicts five horsemen in procession, heading east towards the chapel's choir. The first and third (in order of procession) are crowned, while the fourth carries on his gloved fist a bird of prey, probably a falcon. The presence of this bird suggests that the scene is that of a royal hunt, although some lords and royal personages are accustomed to travelling with a bird of prey at all times. Each rider holds the reins of his mount in one hand, while the other makes a gesture. They seem to be holding two separate conversations, the three riders on the left and the two on the right.

It is likely that this painting is only part of a larger decor, the other elements of which have disappeared, making it impossible to interpret the scene correctly. In particular, the entire lower part of this scene, eaten away by saltpetre, could not be saved during the 1879 restoration. It is impossible to know, for example, whether dogs were standing at the horses' feet, which would support the hypothesis of a hunting scene.

==== Symbolism ====
When the painting was first discovered in 1964 and again in the late 1990s, many authors considered the identification of the figures in the painting, assuming that the horsemen were representations of members of the Plantagenet family. Only Marc Thibout, in 1965, suggested, with many reservations, the possibility of a representation of the legend of Charlemagne, Saint Giles and the hind.

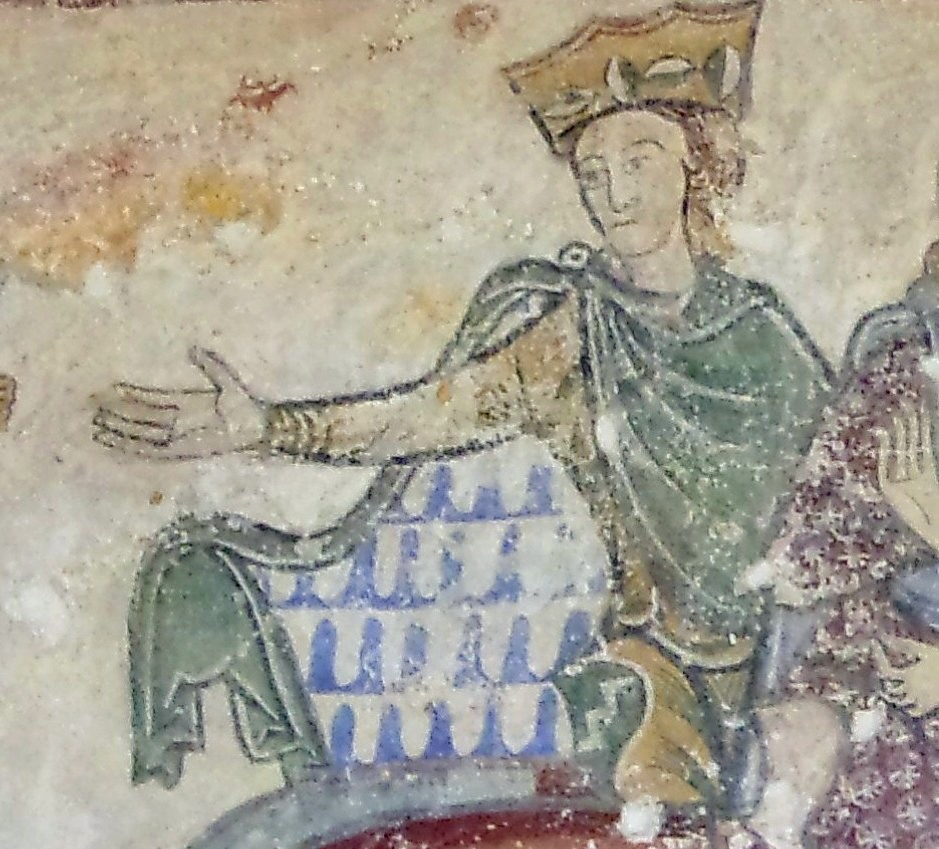
Third rider in the "royal hunt".

Assuming that the Plantagenet family is represented, the crowned figures could be Henry II Plantagenet at the head of the procession, a name on which most art historians agree. The second figure wearing a crown would be Eleanor of Aquitaine or their eldest son Henry the Young King, crowned during his father's lifetime in 1170. The other figures, occupying different positions in the painting according to different interpretations, would be John Lackland, Richard the Lionhearted and Geoffrey II of Brittany, other children of Henry II and Eleanor.

Nurith Kenaan-Kedar interprets the painting as a depiction of Eleanor's departure (the figure at the center of the painting) into captivity in 1174; other historians refer to the queen's release fifteen years later.

One interpretation of the scene, featuring different characters, sees it as a representation of the visit made by Jean Lackland and Isabella of Angoulême to Chinon shortly after their marriage on August 24, 1200; Jean sans Terre is said to be riding at the head of the procession, followed by Isabelle (not yet crowned) and Berengaria of Navarre.

Whether it's a hunting scene, a departure into captivity or a newlyweds' journey, none of these proposals displays a strong sacred symbolism, due to the absence of religious figures; the fact that the painting was executed in a chapel and that the procession heads towards the choir like a pilgrimage is no doubt not insignificant

==== Dating and painting technique ====
At the time of its discovery and in the late 1990s, art historians suggested that the painting's pictorial style and potential subject matter point to its completion in the last decades of the XIth century or at the beginning of the XIII century. A carbon-14 dating carried out in 2019 on samples of the charcoal in the painted plaster enables us to estimate that the painting was executed in the middle or second half of the xi century, thus ruling out certain previous hypotheses suggesting an early xii century painting. This dating, which still needs to be confirmed, could pave the way for new discussions on the symbolism of the painting and the figures featured in it.

A relatively coarse-grained mortar, called arricio, is first applied to compensate for the unevenness of the wall surface. This is then covered with intonaco, a plaster of the same composition but very fine-grained, to receive the layers of paint, which are applied here in successive horizontal bands, starting at the top of the painting. The technique used to create this work combines painting on fresh plaster (fresco) and supplements on dry plaster (tempera). The preparatory drawing, underpainting of the figures, their complexion and the flat tints are done using the fresco technique on fresh plaster. The highlights, contours, lighting, framing and, finally, the background of the scene are painted on the dry plaster.

The style shows a gradual abandonment of facial modeling, which, combined with the technique used, indicates a late-Romanesque achievement already incorporating pictorial techniques developing more widely in the early thirteenth century. Slight variations in style and technique between the different parts of the painting suggest, however, that several artists may have been involved in its production, one painting the three riders on the right, including the two crowned ones, a second painting the two riders on the left and a third taking care of the horses, very finely depicted.

=== Other paints ===
The walls and vault of the niche occupied by Jean's recumbent bed were decorated with red paint in the 15th century, but only remnants remain.

The western chapel, known as the "Chapelle Saint-Mexme", closest to Jean's recumbent recumbent, still retains some traces of badly altered 11th-century paintings. Two campaigns can be distinguished. First, a garland of flowers is painted. It is then covered with a plaster supporting decorations. These may be a continuation of the "royal hunt" scene; in any case, they are part of the same campaign, using the same painting techniques. This second painting depicts part of a boat sailing on the water at the beginning of the chapel vault.

The walls of the eastern chapel, known as the "Chapelle Sainte-Radegonde", which provides access to the well and complex cavity system, are decorated with scenes from the lives of Radegonde and Jean; these 17th-century paintings were extensively restored in the 19th century, with the sky repainted blue with gold stars. It turns out that these paintings cover an earlier decoration; on the vault, an angel, probably painted in the 13th century or later, appears - it was uncovered during the 2006 surveys - while on the west wall, a bearded man appears.

The apse vault of the troglodytic nave is decorated with a 19th-century painting of Christ in glory in a mandorla, surrounded by the tetramorph (Matthew and John above, Mark and Luke below), while below, separated from the previous motif by a frieze of flowers, the walls are painted red, dotted with the golden Christogram monogram. The flaking of the 19th-century paint reveals, beneath the Christ motif, an earlier decoration that may represent a similar scene.

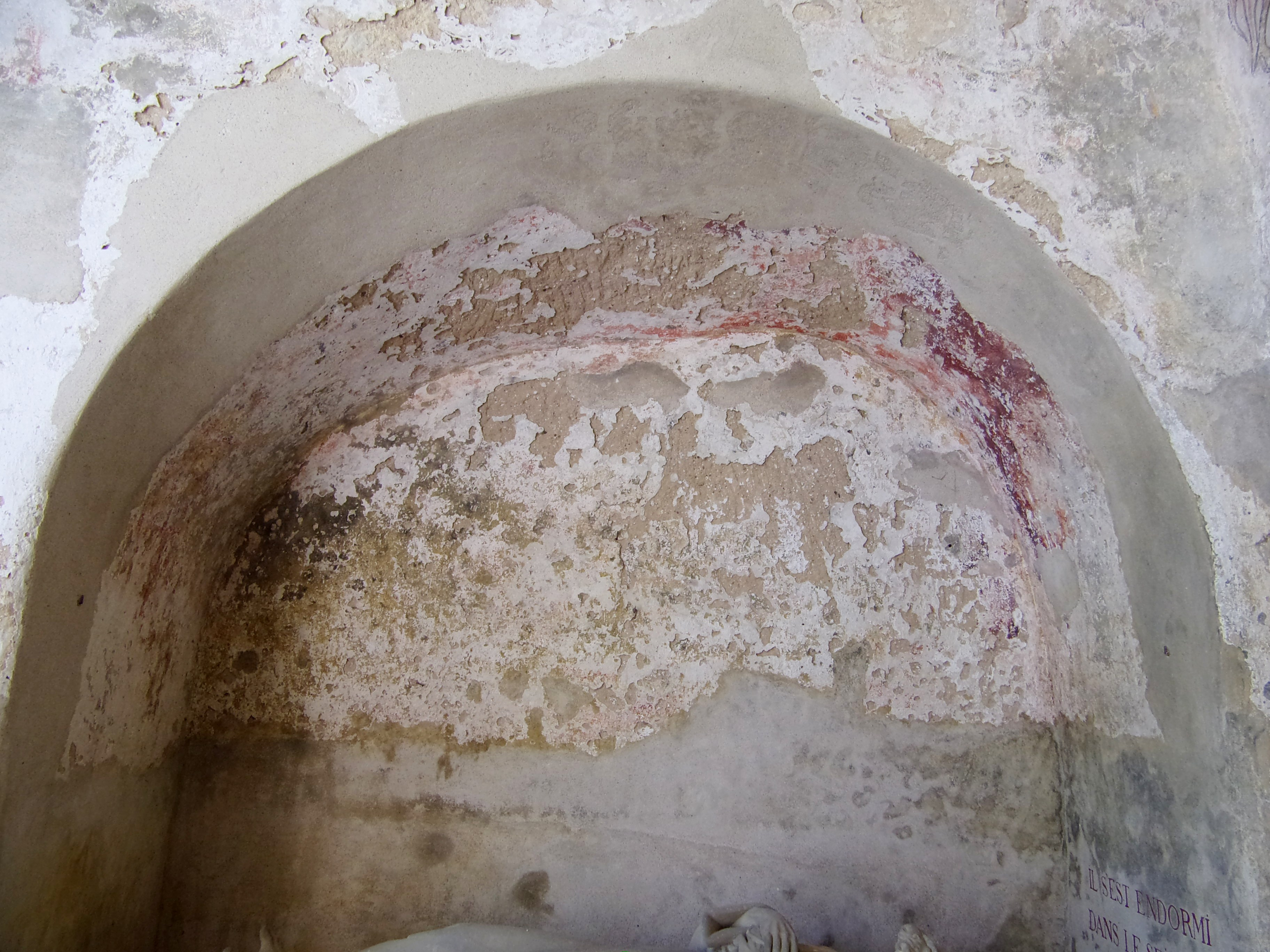
Vault (Jean's recumbent niche).

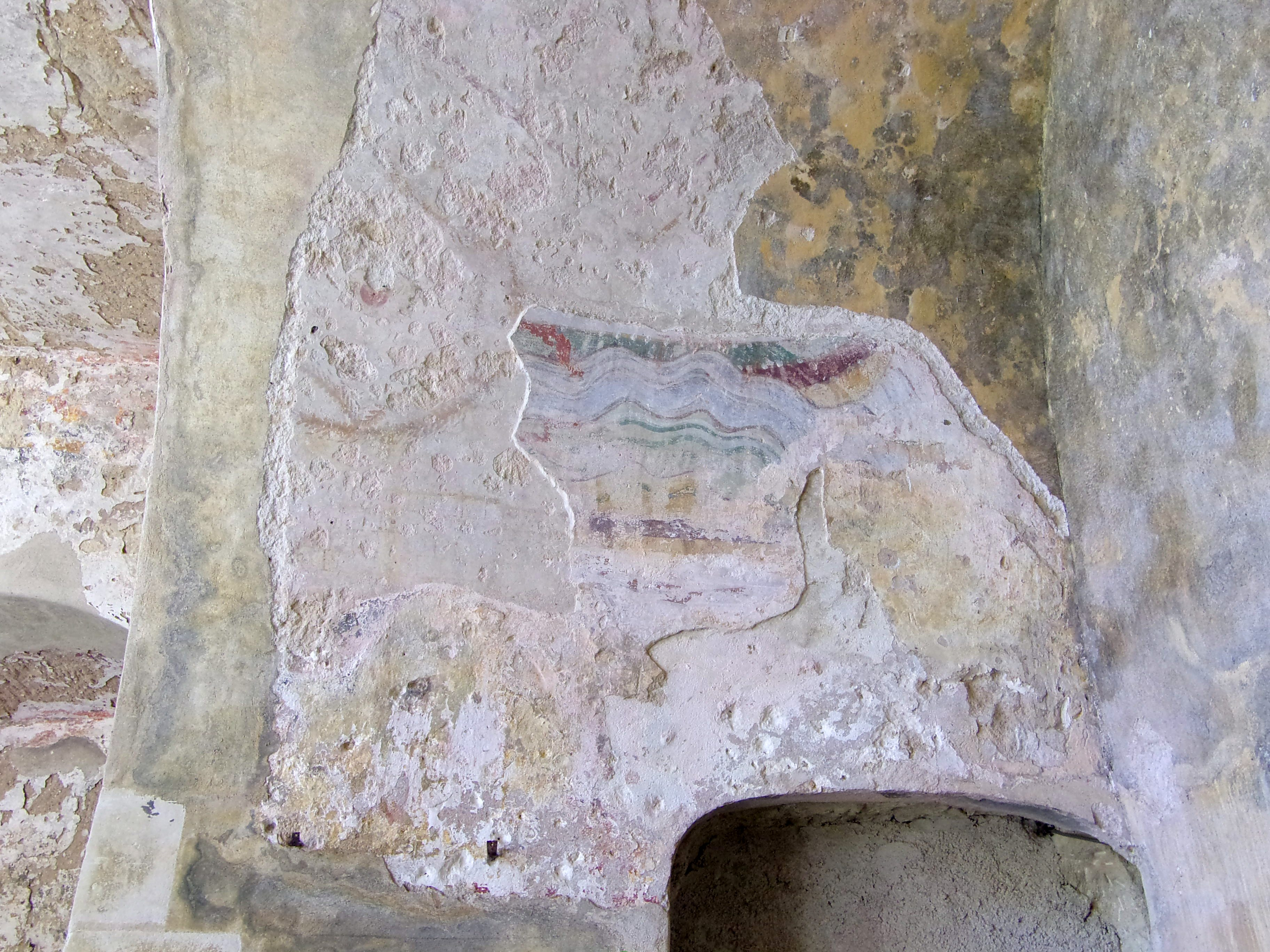
Garland and boat (west chapel).

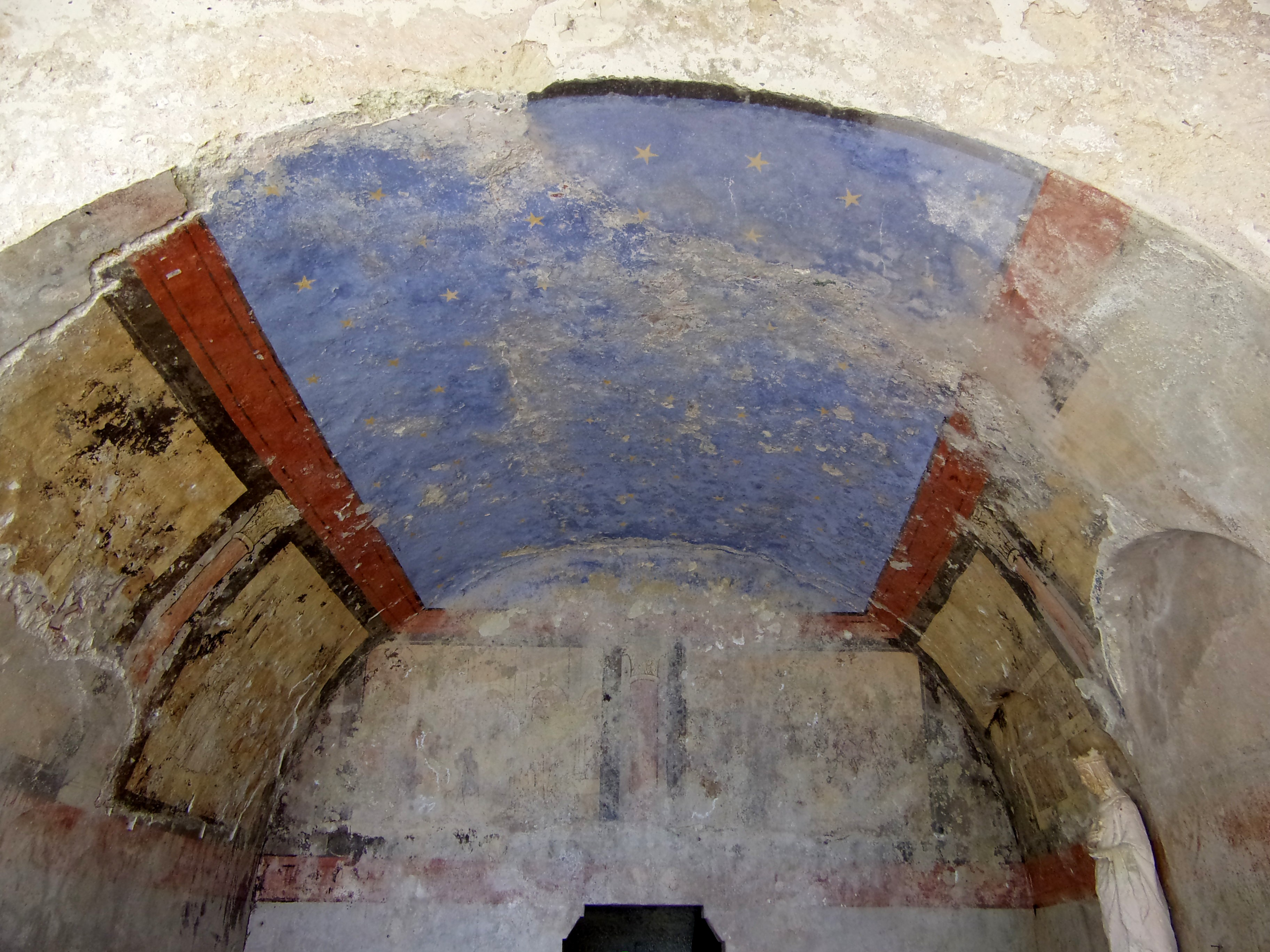
Decor (eastern chapel).

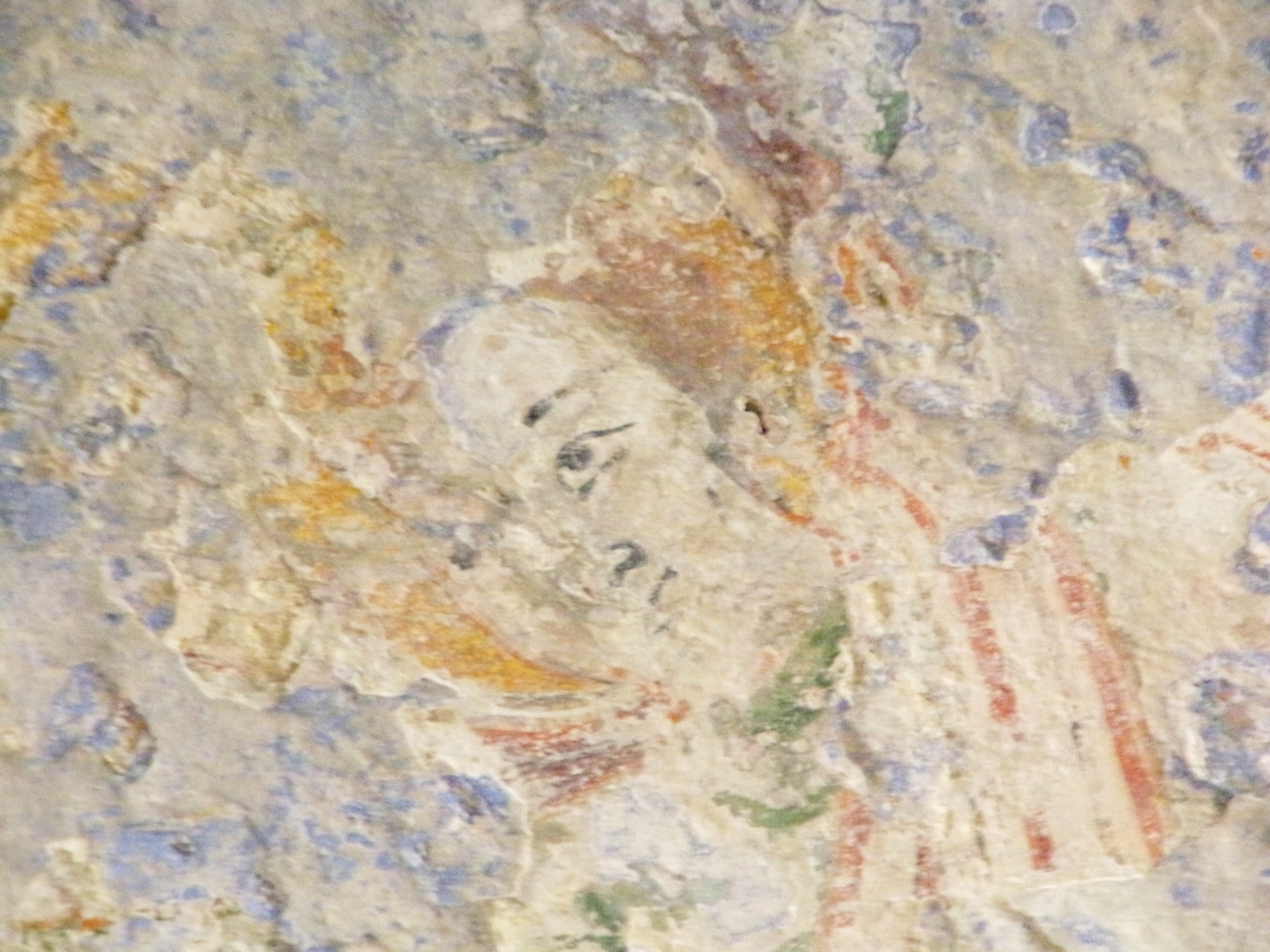
The Angel (eastern chapel vault).

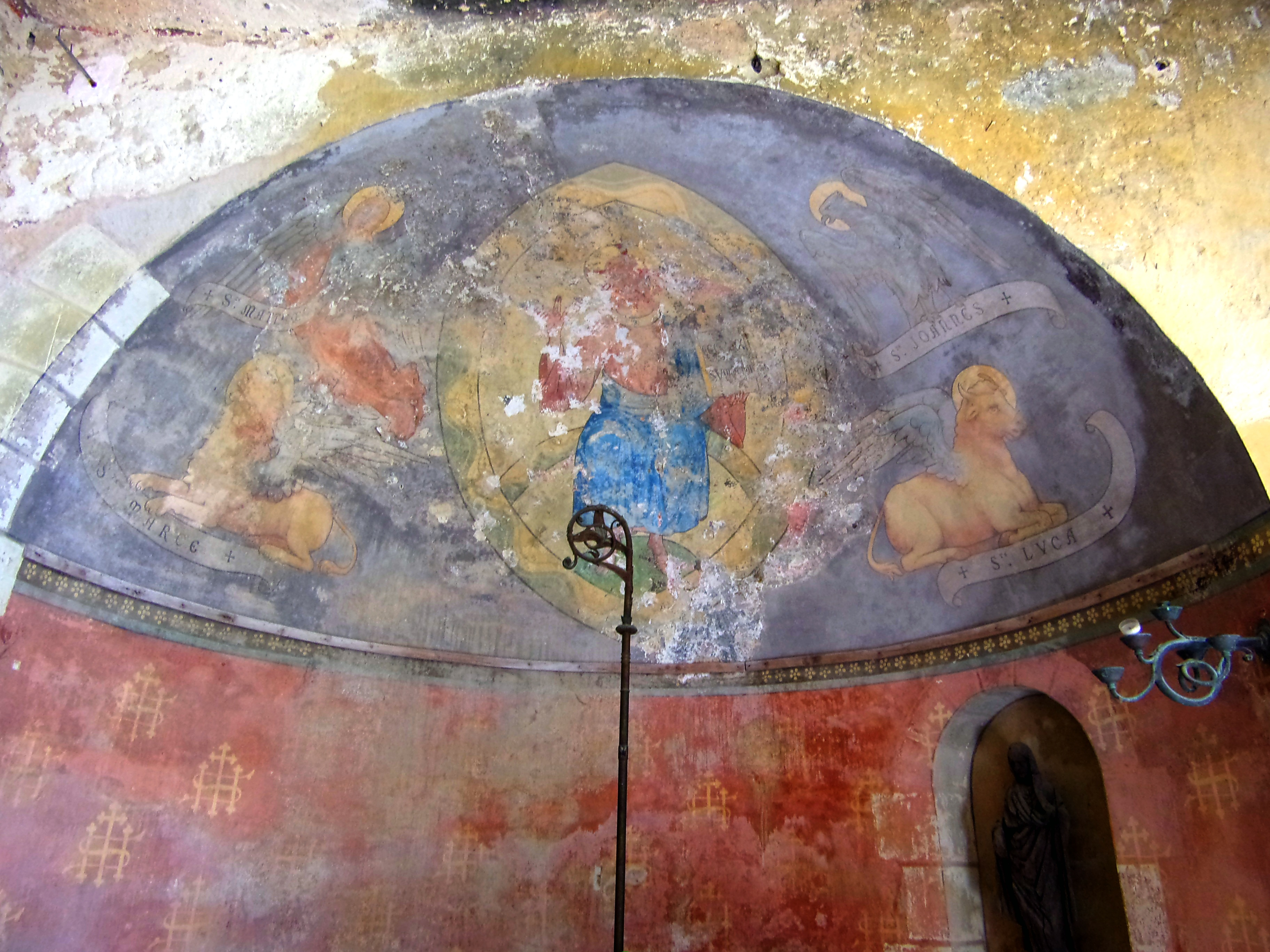
Christ and the tetramorph (cave apse).

== See also ==
- Monolithic church

== Bibliography ==
=== Chapelle Sainte Radegonde (Chinon) ===
- Héron, Albert (1965). "Découverte de peintures murales à la Chapelle Sainte-Radegonde de Chinon". Bulletin de la Société des amis du Vieux Chinon. VI (9): 481–488.
- Kenaan-Kedar, Nurith (1998). "Aliénor d'Aquitaine conduite en captivité. Les peintures murales commémoratives de Sainte Radegonde de Chinon". Cahiers de civilisation médiévale. 41 (164): 317–330. doi:10.3406/ccmed.1998.2730.
- Kleinmann, Dorothée; Garcia, Michel; Cloulas, Ivan; Kenaan-Kedar, Nurith (1999). "Les peintures murales de Sainte-Radegonde de Chinon. À propos d'un article récent". Cahiers de civilisation médiévale. 42 (168): 397–99. doi:10.3406/ccmed.1999.2766.
- Marzais, Amaëlle (2022). "Pour une archéologie des peintures murales, la Chasse royale de la chapelle Sainte-Radegonde à Chinon (Indre-et-Loire) : étude technique et résultat des datations par le 14C". Revue archéologique du Centre de la France. 61.
- Nilgen, Ursula (1999). "Les Plantagenêts à Chinon. À propos d'une peinture murale dans la chapelle de Sainte-Radegonde". Iconographica. Mélanges offerts à Piotr Skubiszewski, Poitiers, Centre d'études supérieures de civilisation médiéval. Vol. Civilisation médiévale (7 ed.). pp. 153–158. ISBN 978-2-9514-5060-8.

=== Pictorial art, heritage and traditions in Touraine ===
- Val de Loire roman et Touraine romane, Saint-Léger-Vauban. éditions Zodiaque. 1965. p. 414.
- Couderc, Jean-Mary (1987). Dictionnaire des communes de Touraine. Chambray-lès-Tours: CLD. p. 967. ISBN 2-85443-136-7.
- de Cougny, Gustave (1898). Chinon et ses environs. Tours: Mame. p. 567.
- Féneant, Jacques; Leveel, Maryse (1989). Le Folklore de la Touraine : dictionnaire des rites et coutumes. Chambray-lès-Tours: CLD. p. 466. ISBN 2-85443-179-0.
- Flohic, Jean-Luc (2001). Patrimoine des communes d'Indre-et-Loire. Paris: Flohic. p. 1408. ISBN 2-84234-115-5.
- Lorans, Élisabeth (2006). "Saint-Mexme de Chinon ve – xxe siècles". Archéologie et histoire de l'art. Paris: éditions du CTHS. p. 598. ISBN 978-2-7355-0609-5.
- Marzais, Amaelle (2021). "De la main à l'esprit : étude sur les techniques et les styles des peintures murales dans l'ancien diocèse de Tours (xi et xv siècles)". Centre d'études supérieures de le Renaissance. I, II and III. Tours: 268 and 915.
- Oury, Guy-Marie (1978). Le Pays de Chinon, Normand-CLD. Vol. La Touraine au fil des siècles. p. 229.
- Ranjard, Robert (1986) [1949]. La Touraine archéologique : guide du touriste en Indre-et-Loire, Mayenne, Imprimerie de la Manutention (3rd ed.). p. 733. ISBN 2-85554-017-8.
- Terrier-Fourmy, Bérénice (2002). Voir et croire. Peintures murales médiévales en Touraine. Tours: Conseil général d'Indre-et-Loire. pp. 46–47.
