= Montrichard Val de Cher =

Montrichard-Val-de-Cher
- Commune
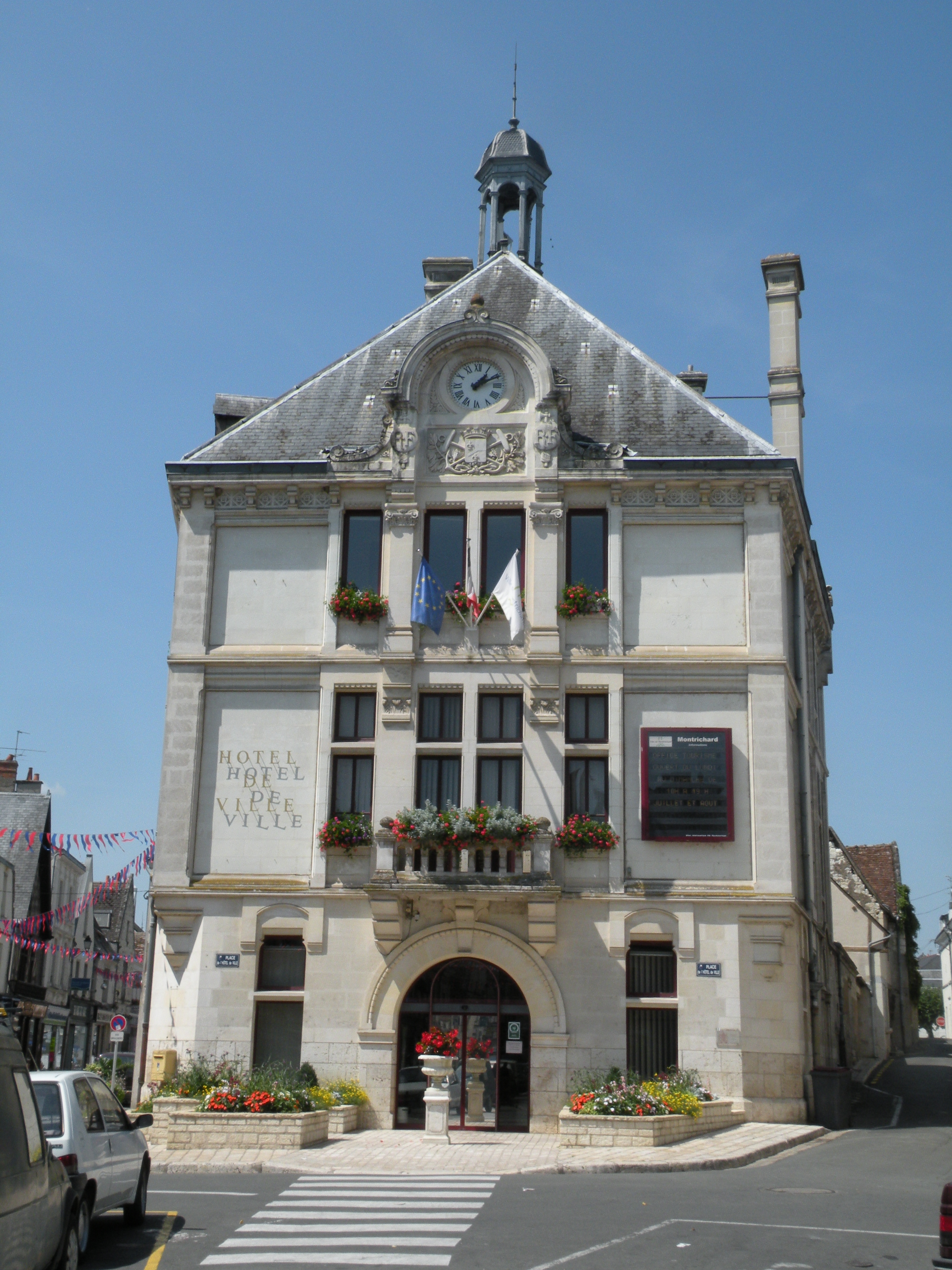
- Montrichard Val de Cher Town hall
- Location of Montrichard-Val-de-Cher
- Location within France Location within Centre-Val de Loire
- Coordinates: 47°20′35″N 1°11′02″E
- Country: France
- Region: Centre-Val de Loire
- Department: Loir-et-Cher
- Arrondissement: Romorantin-Lanthenay
- Canton: Montrichard Val de Cher

Government
  - Mayor (2020–2026): Damien Hénault
- Area^{1}: 19.20 km^{2} (7.41 sq mi)
- Highest elevation: 134 m (440 ft)
- Lowest elevation: 58 m (190 ft)
- Population (2023): 3,611
  - Density: 188.1/km^{2} (487.1/sq mi)
- Time zone: UTC+01:00 (CET)
  - Summer (DST): UTC+02:00 (CEST)
- INSEE/Postal code: 41151 /41400
- ^{1} French Land Register data, which excludes lakes, ponds, glaciers > 1 km^{2} (0.386 sq mi or 247 acres) and river estuaries.

Montrichard Val de Cher or Montrichard-Val-de-Cher (French pronunciation: [mɔ̃tʁiʃaʁ val də ʃɛʁ]), is a commune in the Loir-et-Cher department in the Centre-Val de Loire region, France. The municipality was established on 1 January 2016 by merger of the former communes of Montrichard and Bourré.

== Population ==
Population data refer to the commune in its geography as of January 2025.

Historical population
Year	Pop.	±% p.a.
1968	4,409	—
1975	4,956	+1.68%
1982	4,755	−0.59%
1990	4,618	−0.36%
1999	4,298	−0.79%
2007	4,176	−0.36%
2012	4,083	−0.45%
2017	3,810	−1.37%
2023	3,611	−0.89%
Source: INSEE

== See also ==
- Communes of the Loir-et-Cher department
