= Montrichard =

Commune in Loir-et-Cher, France

- Part of Montrichard Val de Cher
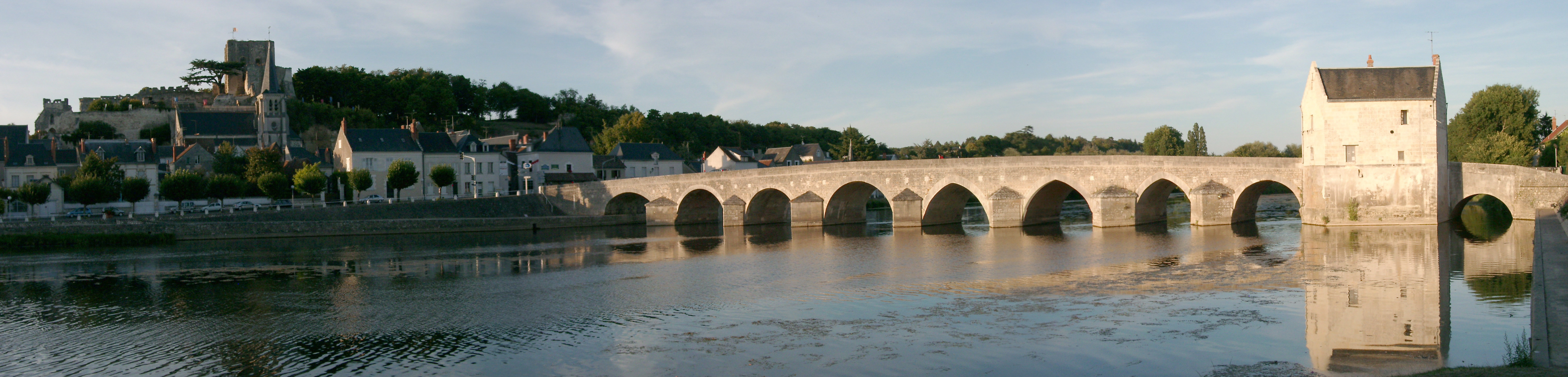
- The Cher River at Montrichard

- Coat of arms
- Location of Montrichard
- Location within France Location within Centre-Val de Loire
- Coordinates: 47°20′37″N 1°11′03″E
- Country: France
- Region: Centre-Val de Loire
- Department: Loir-et-Cher
- Arrondissement: Blois
- Canton: Montrichard Val de Cher
- Commune: Montrichard Val de Cher
- Area^{1}: 14.36 km^{2} (5.54 sq mi)
- Elevation: 68 m (223 ft)
- Highest elevation: 134 m (440 ft)
- Lowest elevation: 59 m (194 ft)
- Population (2022): 3,048
  - Density: 212.3/km^{2} (549.7/sq mi)
- Demonym: Montrichardais(e)
- Time zone: UTC+01:00 (CET)
  - Summer (DST): UTC+02:00 (CEST)
- Postal code: 41400
- ^{1} French Land Register data, which excludes lakes, ponds, glaciers > 1 km^{2} (0.386 sq mi or 247 acres) and river estuaries.

Montrichard (French pronunciation: [mɔ̃tʁiʃaʁ]) is a town and former commune in the Loir-et-Cher department, Centre-Val de Loire, France. On 1 January 2016, it was merged into the new commune of Montrichard Val de Cher.

During the French Revolution, the commune was known as Montégalité.

== Geography ==
The town lies on the north bank of the river Cher. 32 kilometres (20 mi) south of Blois, 73 kilometres (45 mi) west of Vierzon and 42 kilometres (26 mi) east of Tours. The countryside is mainly constituted of vineyard, woods, cattle and cereals.

== Sites and monuments ==
- Château de Montrichard, a mediaeval castle.
- Nanteuil Church (12th, 13th, 15th centuries), whose statue of the Virgin Mary is the object of a very ancient pilgrimage on Whit Monday.
- Church of the Holy Cross (Église Ste-Croix) has a fine Romanesque doorway and was the site of Joan of France's marriage to the future king.
- Château de Pont-Cher, a 15th-century home built into the cliff, containing the René Galloux collection of prehistoric and Gallo-Roman artefacts from excavations in the Cher valley.

== Pronunciation ==
Montrichard is pronounced French pronunciation: [mɔ̃tʁiʃaʁ], with a T sound, despite its silence in the word mont and similar place names such as Montréal. One of the explanations that may justify the pronunciation of the T is that Montrichard is derived from the words mont (mountain, hill), tri (for three) and chard (square), because the town is situated on a hill surrounded on three sides by square towers.

== Notable people ==
- Joan of France, Duchess of Berry, married the future king of France Louis XII in Montrichard, though the marriage was later annulled.
- André Alerme, a French actor who appeared in more than 70 films, died here in 1960.
- Paulette Abagnale, mother of Frank Abagnale, confidence trickster
- Gaétan Cathelineau, painter of portraits and of historical and genre subjects.
- Eugénie Luce, French educator who lived and worked in Algiers, died in Montrichard in 1882.

== Popular culture ==
The town is mentioned in the 2002 film Catch Me If You Can, as the town from which the mother of Frank Abagnale came. Later in the film, Abagnale has set up a high-end printing facility for printing corporate cheques in Montrichard when he is tracked down and arrested by the FBI. The exterior shots of the town, however, were filmed in the Place Royale in the lower town of Quebec City, Canada, which is identifiable by the presence of the Notre-Dame-des-Victoires Church.
