= Château de Montrichard =

French castle

Coordinates: 47°20′37″N 1°11′10″E

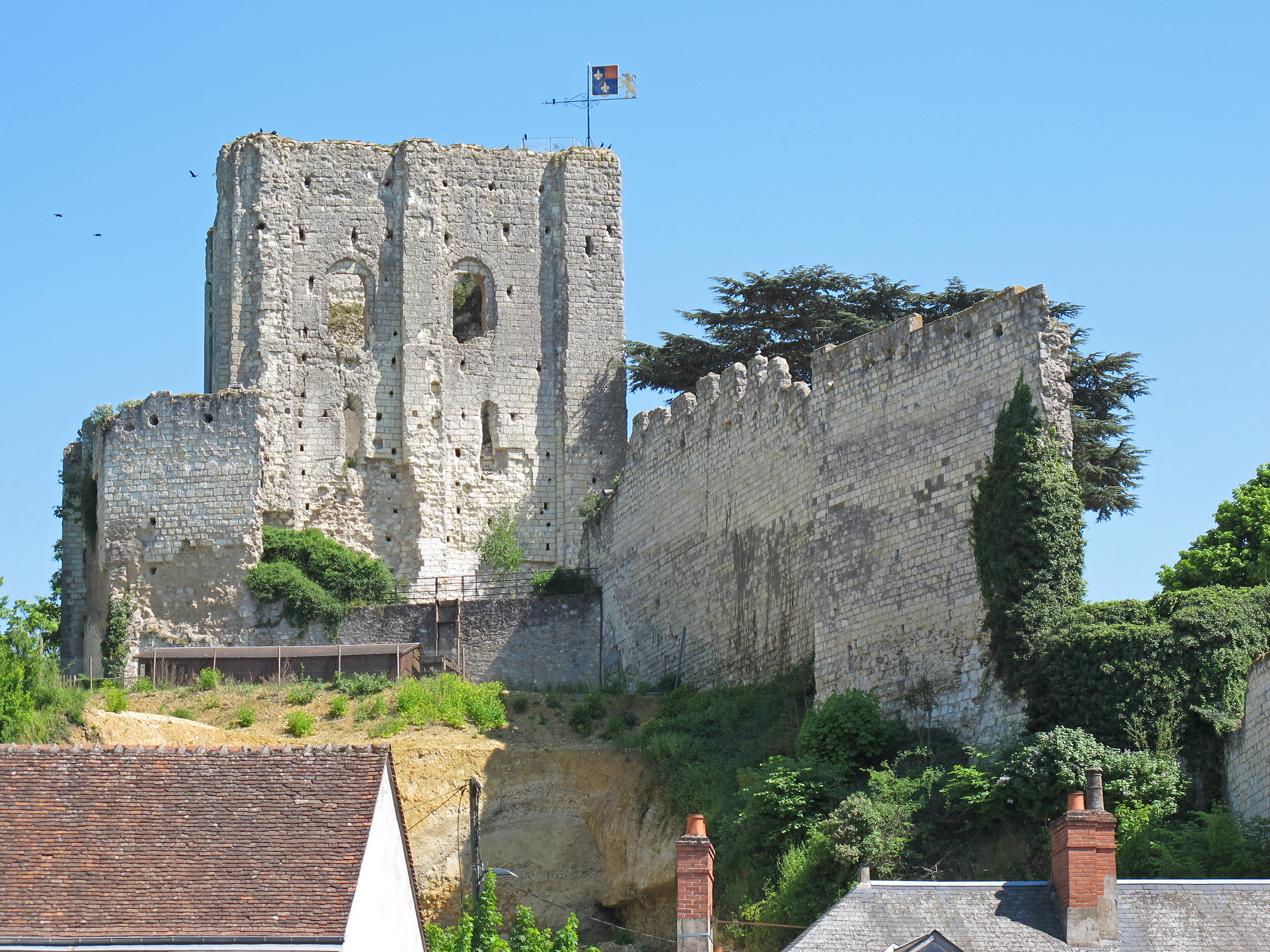
Château de Montrichard, western aspect

The Château de Montrichard is a ruined 11th-century castle at the heart of the commune of Montrichard in the Loir-et-Cher département of France. The property of the commune, it has been listed since 1877 as a monument historique by the French Ministry of Culture.

The castle was constructed by Foulques Nerra, Count of Anjou, and rebuilt in the 12th century. Henri IV ordered it to be dismantled in 1589. From the top of the keep visitors have a good view of the town of Montrichard and the Cher valley.

== See also ==
- List of castles in France
