= Gaétan Cathelineau =

French painter

Gaétan Cathelineau (1787–1859) was a French painter of portraits and of historical and genre subjects.

== Life ==
Cathelineau was born at Montrichard (Loir-et-Cher) in 1787. He was a pupil of Jacques-Louis David, and professor of drawing at the Lyceum of Tours from 1835 to 1858. He died at Tours in 1859, bequeathing to the Museum of that city fifty pictures by different masters, as well as eleven by his own hand.
