= Eugénie Luce =

French educator

- Born: 1804
- Died: 1882 (aged 77–78); Montrichard, France
- Scientific career
- Fields: Education
- Workplaces: Luce Ben Aben School (Luce's school for Muslim girls) in Algiers, Algeria

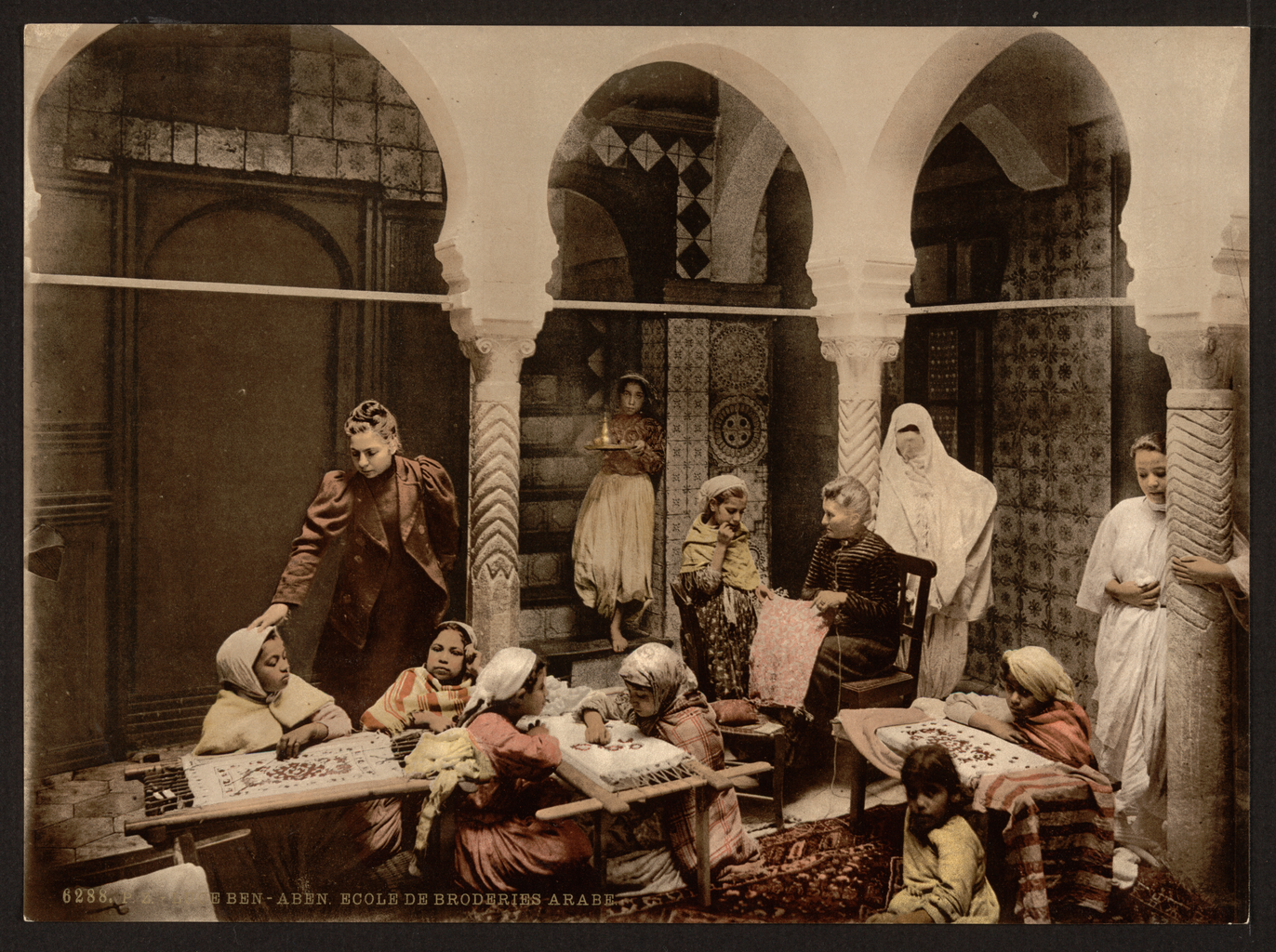
Luce Ben Aben School of Arab Embroidery I, Algiers, Algeria, 1899, seventeen years after the death of Eugénie Luce

Eugénie Allix Luce (1804-1882) was a French educator, who founded the first French/Arab school for Muslim girls, the Luce Ben Aben School in Algiers, Algeria, in 1845.

== Departure from France ==
Eugénie Luce moved to Algiers in the 1830s, where she became a governess. She left behind her husband in France.

== Luce Ben Aben School ==
Eugénie Luce started the Luce Ben Aben School, in 1845. It was the first Franco-Arab school for Muslim girls, offering a European-style education. Girls learned French, Arabic, arithmetic, embroidery, geography, and sewing. The school was funded by the French Algeria government until 1861, after which it became a trade school. Instructors taught embroidery and other subjects in order to educate the girls in traditional Algerian crafts, at a time when these crafts were being replaced by machine-made imports. These goods were exported throughout Algeria, as well as Europe and the United States.

The school was forced to close on 1 January 1846 because of a lack of financial support from the local French government.

To seek funding, Luce sold her possessions and traveled to Paris to ask for help from the central government. After she managed to get support for the school, it was reopened in June 1846 and in January 1847 the French government formally agreed to support the school.

In 1858 Luce had over 120 pupils ranging in age from four to 17. This school produced skilled embroideresses, who appeared in the London Exhibition of 1862 and in the Algerian Pavilion of the 1893 World's Columbian Exhibition at Chicago.

== Death and legacy ==
Luce would eventually return to Montrichard, in France, where she died in 1882. After Luce's departure, her daughter, and then her granddaughter Madame Ben-Aben, continued to run the school until the granddaughter died in 1915.
