= Tuffeau stone =

Limestone from the Loire Valley, France

Tuffeau
- Limestone rock
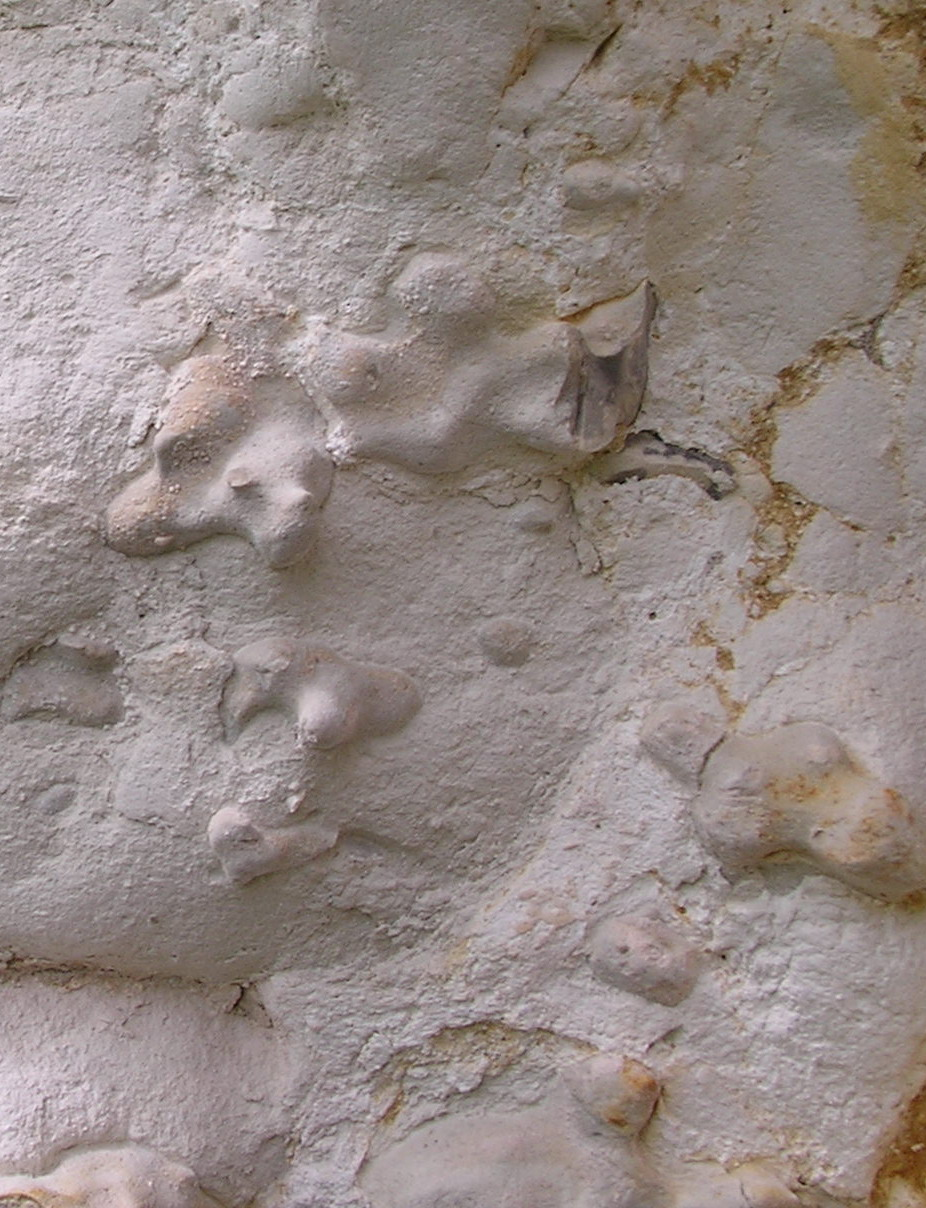
- Tuffeau from the Turonian at La Chapelle-Huon

Tuffeau stone — in French, simply tuffeau or tufeau — is a local limestone of the Loire Valley of France. It is characterized as a chalky or sandy, fine-grained limestone, white to yellowish-cream in appearance, and micaceous (containing some white flakes of mica, or muscovite). The soft stone is extracted from numerous quarries and has made a major mark on the architectural landscape of the Loire and its tributaries — especially the valley's chateaux.

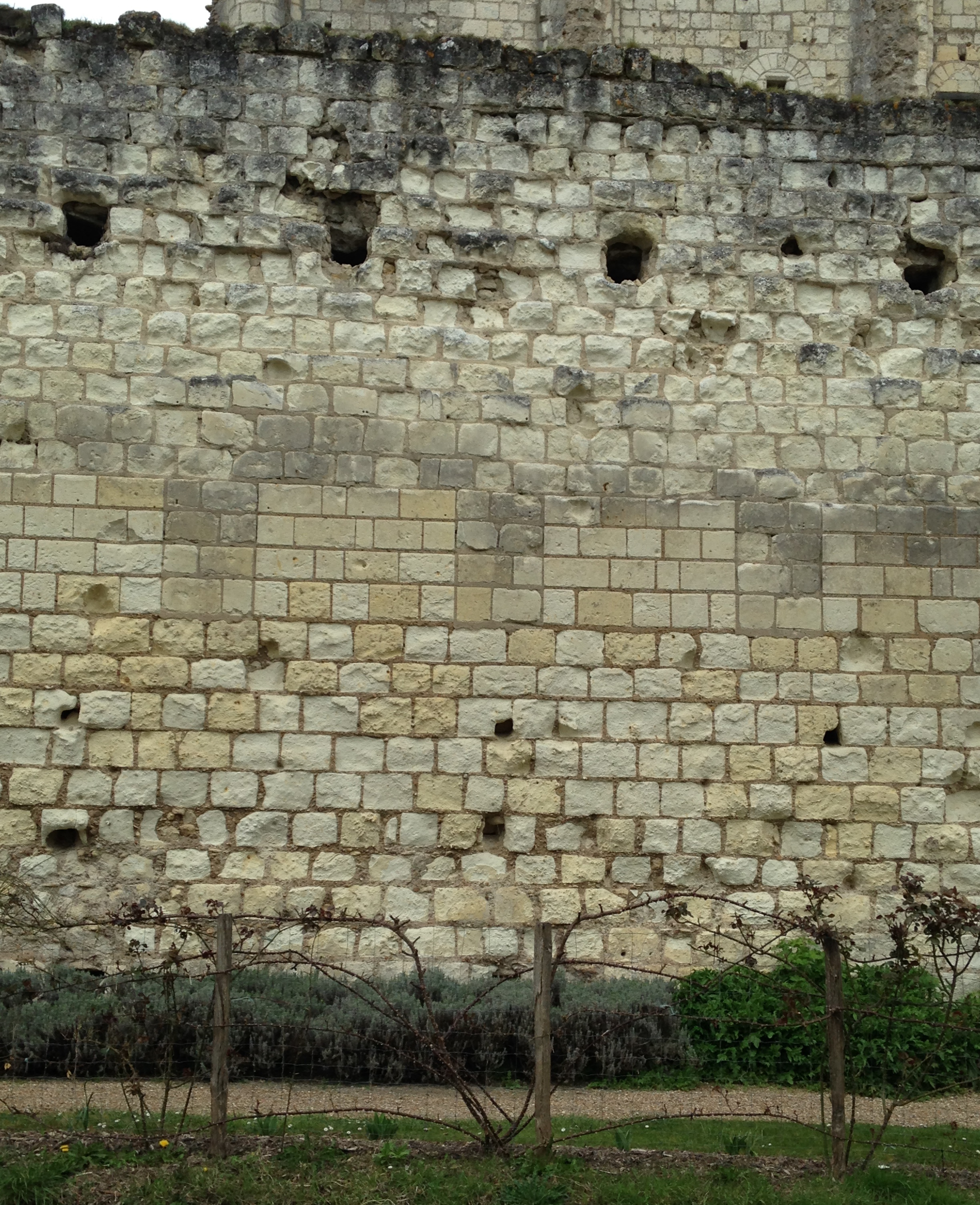
Part of the enciente wall at the Château de Loches, showing tuffeau blocks of various ages and in various stages of decay.

== Geology ==
The tuffeau formed in the Mesozoic era (in the Turonian stage of the Upper Cretaceous). The Loire Valley, at that time, was on the seabed; over the millennia, the sediments that deposited on the bottom, consisting of fossilized living organisms and sand particles, under the effect of pressure underwent crystallization and cementation and formed the tuffeau. It differs from chalk by the presence of Foraminifera and many shell remains deposited in shallow waters, between 2 and 20 meters, and subsequently agitated, as occurs near the shoreline. In contrast, true Chalk is rich in another type of shell microfossil, the coccolith, due to sediment deposition in deeper and calmer waters (about 200 meters deep).

There are several varieties of tuffeau: white tuffeau, the noblest variety, used for the construction of prestigious buildings; yellow tuffeau, more sandy, used in Touraine for the construction of rural buildings; gray tuffeau, with bluish reflections, used in the production of hydraulic lime. Tuffeau has a very low density of 1.3 g/cm^{3}. It has a porosity that reaches 45%; compressive strength is also very low (10 MPa).

The term tuffeau is etymologically linked to tuff, to which it is not geologically related (the latter is of volcanic origin), and to tufa, similar to travertine, to which it is instead geologically similar. All these terms derive from the Latin tōphus or tōfus ("stone").

== Physical properties ==
Tuffeau has a very low density compared with many other rocks, being half as dense as granite, comparable in density with ebony, and only about 10 to 20% heavier than water. It has porosity of up to 50%, whereas that of granite is only about 1%. The compressive strength of the stone is a factor of 10 to 20 times less than that of granite.

== Extraction ==
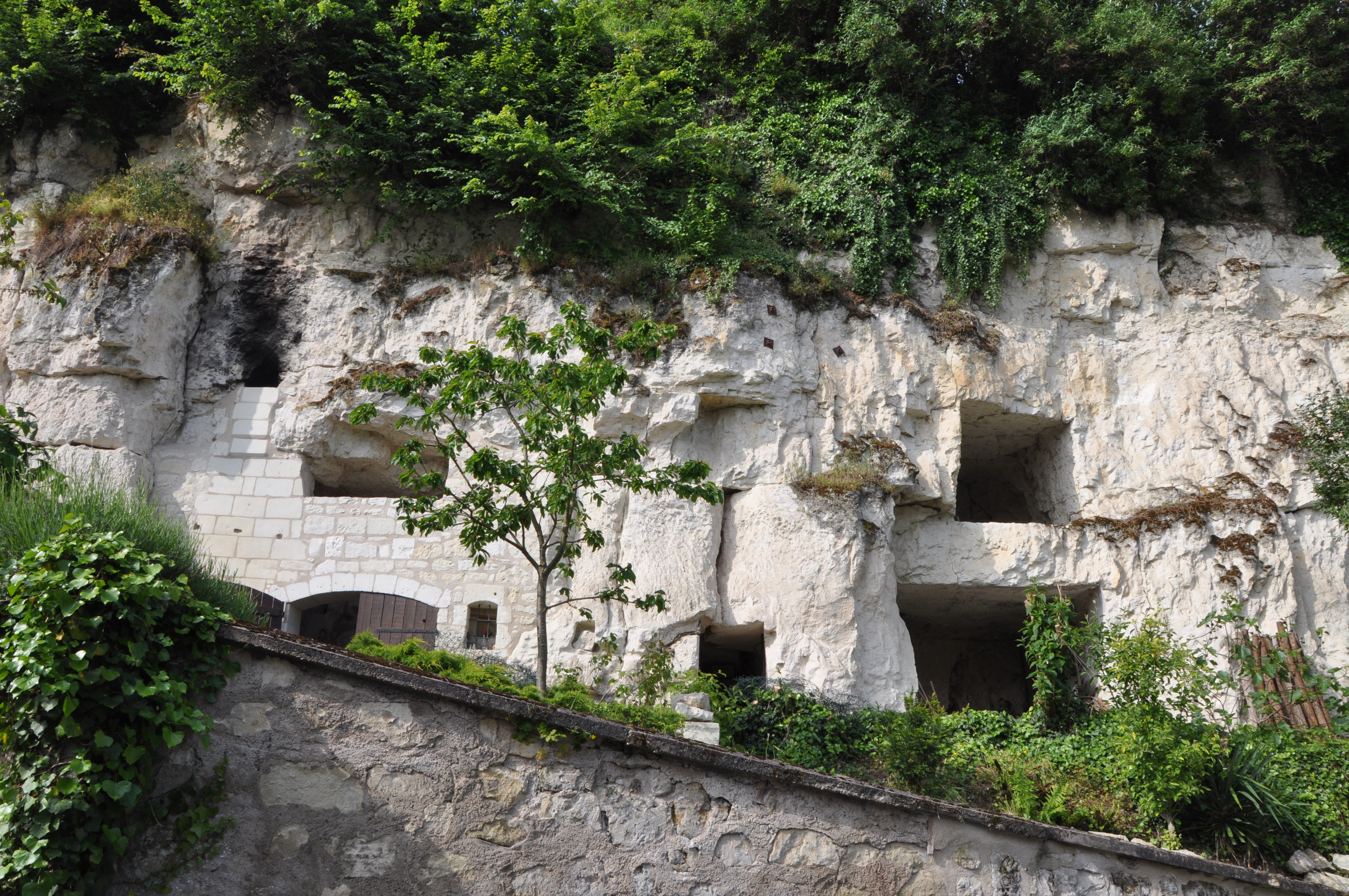
Les troglodytes at Montsoreau.

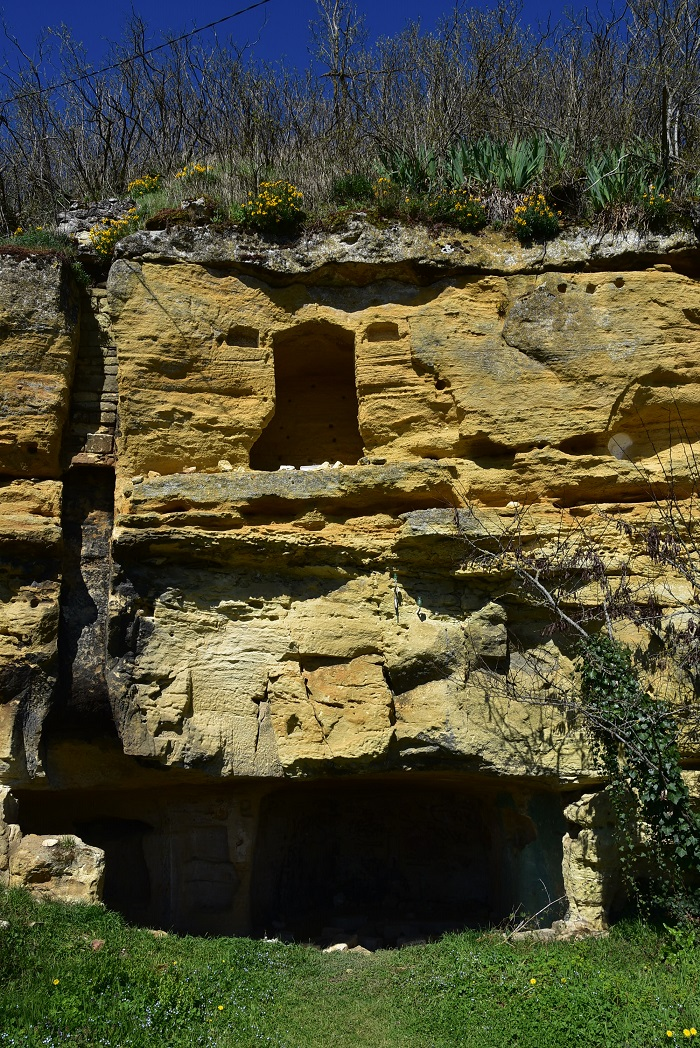
Another example with the old town of Chinon, on the way to Saumur.

The extraction of tuffeau, which began already in the Gallo-Roman period, reached its peak in the 15th century, when, especially in Touraine and Anjou, it was extracted from the natural cliffs overlooking the rivers, mainly the Loire, thanks to which the building blocks were transported on boats. Over the centuries, the extraction of material created vast underground galleries, some of which several kilometers long. These artificial caves, today called les troglodytes and concentrated especially around Saumur, were long used as dwellings thanks to the constant internal temperature throughout the year.

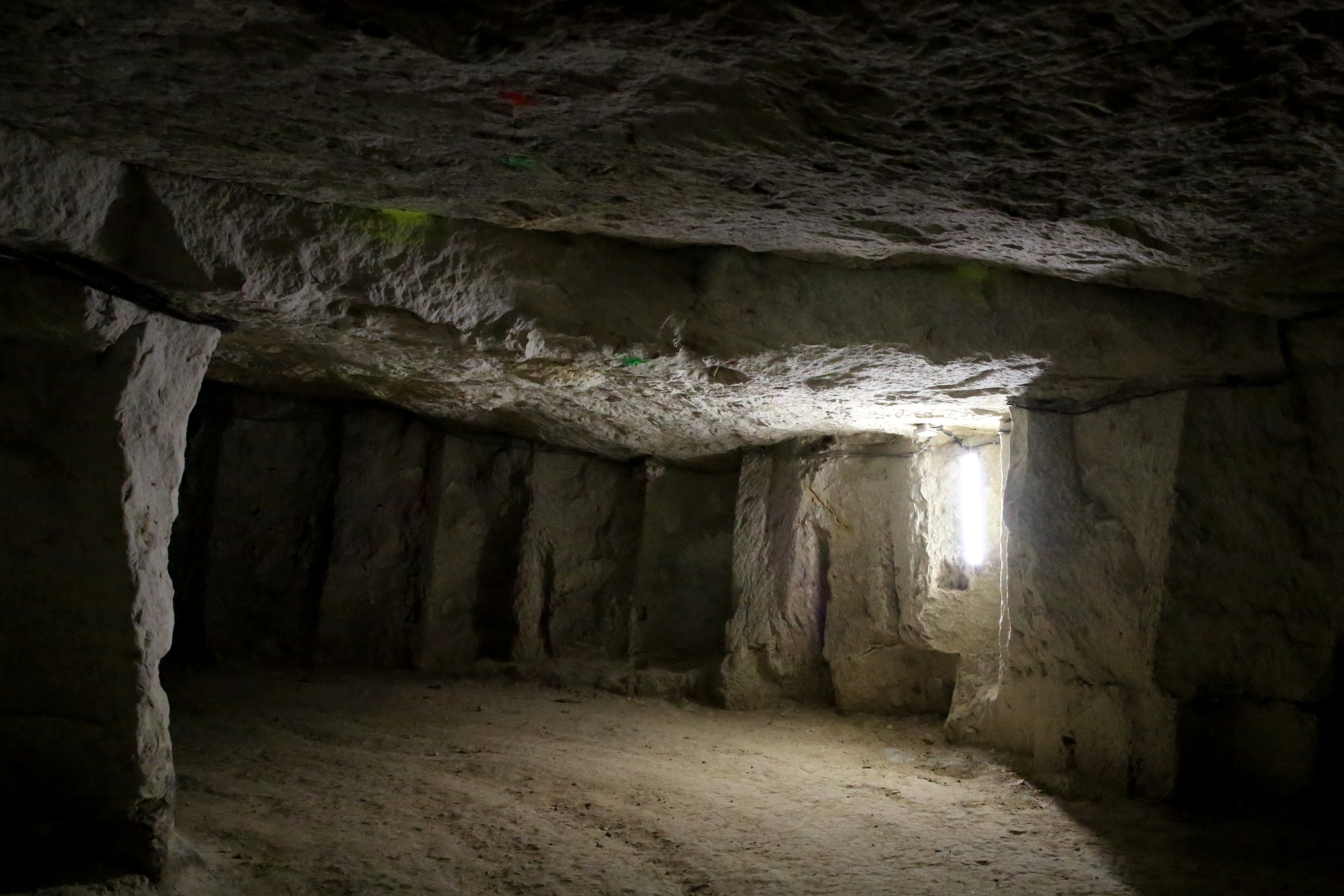
A tuffeau mine at Bourré.

Currently, the quarries are largely used as cellars, while some host mushroom cultivation; tuffeau, after being abandoned around 1950, resumed being extracted in the 1960s, mainly for the restoration of historic buildings.

== Use in architecture ==
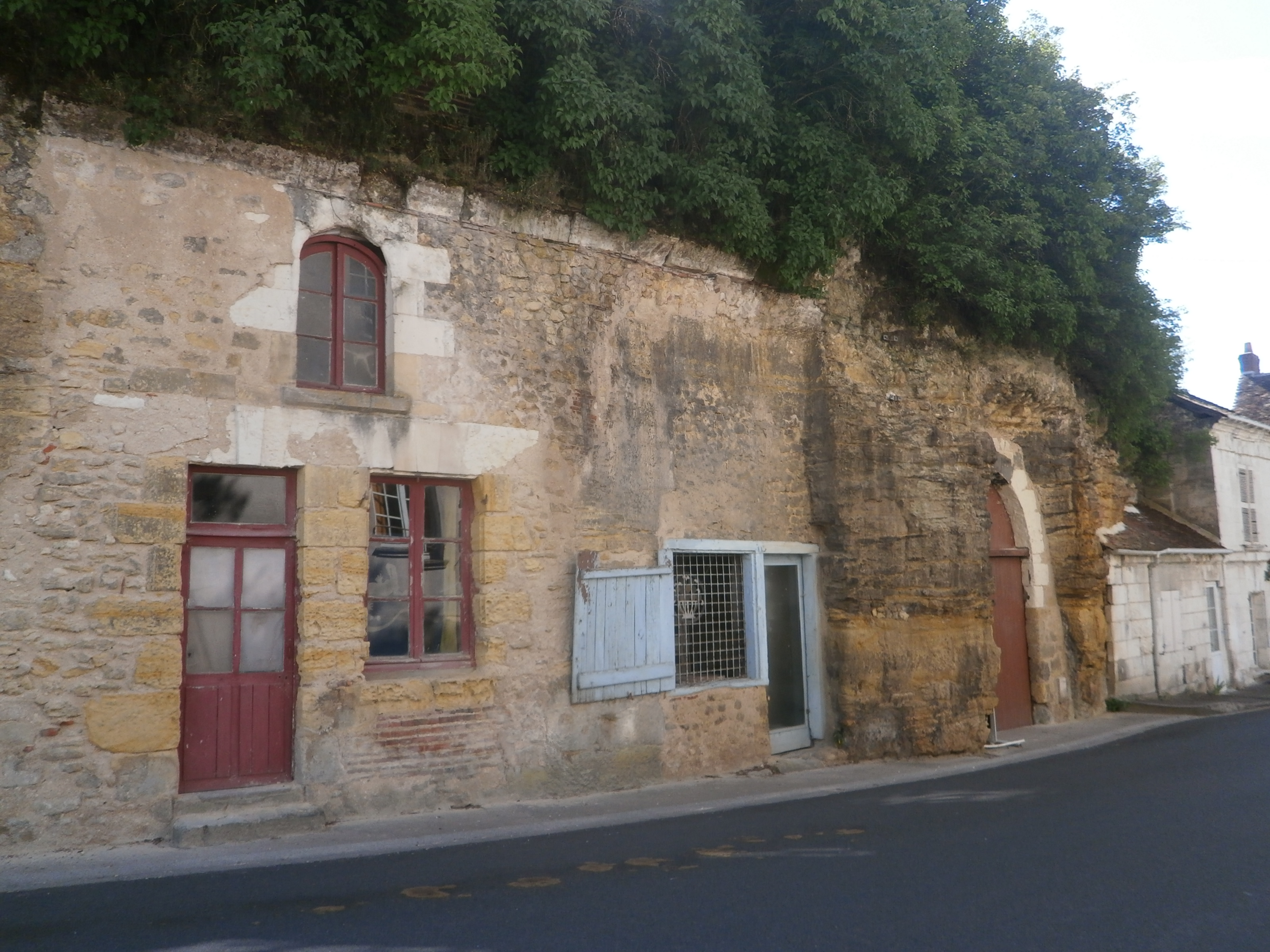
A dwelling in tuffeau at Montrésor.

In the Loire Valley, numerous buildings, public and private, are built in tuffeau, thanks to the ease of working with this material, which allows for elaborate geometries for friezes, pilasters, and capitals. Among the monuments built with this material are the Château de Beaulieu near Saumur, the Château d'Ussé and the Château de la Motte d'Usseau, many worker's cottages at Longères, the Nantes Cathedral and many of the châteaux of the Loire, including those of Chambord, Chinon, Azay-le-Rideau, and Villandry.

Being a soft stone, however, tuffeau is subject to rapid erosion by scaling or chipping, accelerated by weather conditions (humidity, temperature excursion) or environmental (presence of pollutants). For this reason, the stones must be constantly replaced with other tuffeau or with more resistant material.

== See also ==
- List of types of limestone

== Bibliography ==
- Janvier-Badosa, Sarah; Brunetaud, Xavier; Beck, Kévin; Al-Mukhtar, Muzahim (May 2015). "Kinetics of Stone Degradation of the Castle of Chambord in France". International Journal of Architectural Heritage. 10: 96–105. doi:10.1080/15583058.2014.971194.
- Le Port, Jean-Pierre (October 2011). "Le tuffeau, pierre de renaissance en Val de Loire" (PDF). Mines & carrières (in French) (185): 18–23.
