= Bourré, Loir-et-Cher =

Bourré
- Part of Montrichard Val de Cher
- Coat of arms
- Location of Bourré
- Location within France Location within Centre-Val de Loire
- Coordinates: 47°20′53″N 1°13′38″E
- Country: France
- Region: Centre-Val de Loire
- Department: Loir-et-Cher
- Arrondissement: Blois
- Canton: Montrichard Val de Cher
- Commune: Montrichard Val de Cher
- Area^{1}: 4.84 km^{2} (1.87 sq mi)
- Elevation: 65 m (213 ft)
- Highest elevation: 134 m (440 ft)
- Lowest elevation: 58 m (190 ft)
- Population (2023): 586
  - Density: 121/km^{2} (314/sq mi)
- Time zone: UTC+01:00 (CET)
  - Summer (DST): UTC+02:00 (CEST)
- Postal code: 41400
- ^{1} French Land Register data, which excludes lakes, ponds, glaciers > 1 km^{2} (0.386 sq mi or 247 acres) and river estuaries.

Bourré (French pronunciation: [buʁe]) is a former commune in the Loir-et-Cher département in central France. On 1 January 2016, it was merged into the new commune of Montrichard Val de Cher.

== See also ==
- Communes of the Loir-et-Cher department
