= 2016 Paris–Nice =

2016 UCI World Tour, race 2 of 28
- Route of the 2016 Paris–Nice

Race details
- Dates: 6–13 March 2016
- Stages: 8
- Distance: 1,293.6 km (803.8 mi)
- Winning time: 27h 26' 40"

Results
Jersey awarded to the overall winner	Winner	Geraint Thomas (GBR)	(Team Sky)
	Second	Alberto Contador (ESP)	(Tinkoff)
	Third	Richie Porte (AUS)	(BMC Racing Team)
Jersey awarded to the points classification winner	Points	Michael Matthews (AUS)	(Orica–GreenEDGE)
Jersey awarded to the mountains classification winner	Mountains	Antoine Duchesne (CAN)	(Direct Énergie)
	Team	Movistar Team	

The 2016 Paris–Nice was a road cycling stage race that took place in France between 6 and 13 March 2016. It was the 74th edition of the Paris–Nice and was the second event of the 2016 UCI World Tour.

The race took place over eight stages, travelling south from Conflans-Sainte-Honorine to finish on the Promenade des Anglais in Nice, although one stage was cancelled due to weather conditions. After a prologue individual time trial, the first few stages were suited to sprinters. The decisive stages came on the final two days, with routes taking the riders through the Alps. The favourites for victory were therefore the climbers, including the defending champion Richie Porte (BMC Racing Team), Alberto Contador (Tinkoff) and Geraint Thomas (Team Sky).

Michael Matthews (Orica–GreenEDGE) won the prologue and took the leader's yellow jersey. He kept the jersey through the next five days, winning one more of the stages in a sprint. He lost the jersey on the summit finish on Stage 6 to Thomas, who in turn came close to losing it on the final day. After he was dropped by Contador on the final climb of the race, the Col d'Èze, he had to chase back on. At the end of the race, Thomas beat Contador by four seconds, with Richie Porte third a further eight seconds back. Matthews won the points classification and Antoine Duchesne (Direct Énergie) the mountains classification; Movistar won the team classification.

== Teams ==
The race organisers invited 22 teams to participate. The 18 UCI WorldTeams were automatically invited and obliged to send a squad. The race organisers also invited four UCI Professional Continental teams as wildcards. These were all French teams: Cofidis, Direct Énergie, Delko–Marseille Provence KTM and Fortuneo–Vital Concept.

Each team could include up to eight riders. All the teams except Lotto–Soudal filled all eight slots; Lotto–Soudal's team of seven meant that the peloton at the start of the race included 167 riders. Lotto–Soudal also chose to compete under a different name from the rest of the season: they became Lotto Fix ALL, taking the name of one of a product made by Soudal, their normal sponsor. They also wore grey and white jerseys in place of their normal red and white.

UCI WorldTeams

- AG2R La Mondiale
- Astana
- BMC Racing Team
- Etixx–Quick-Step
- FDJ
- IAM Cycling
- Lampre–Merida
- Movistar Team
- Team Giant–Alpecin
- Team Katusha
- LottoNL–Jumbo
- Team Dimension Data
- Team Sky
- Tinkoff
- Trek–Segafredo
- Orica–GreenEDGE
- Cannondale
- Lotto Fix ALL

UCI Professional Continental teams

- Cofidis
- Direct Énergie
- Delko–Marseille Provence KTM
- Fortuneo–Vital Concept

== Route ==
The route of the 2016 Paris–Nice was announced on 17 December 2015. The race began with a 6.1-kilometre (3.8 mi) prologue individual time trial in Conflans-Sainte-Honorine, near Paris, on Sunday 6 March and continued for the following seven days. The remaining stages were all road stages, with no other time trials. Stage 1 included two dirt tracks in the final part of the stage, with exposed roads made a possibility. Stage 3 was scheduled to finish on Mont Brouilly, a 3-kilometre (1.9 mi) climb at a 7.7% gradient. Stage 5 included part of the climb of Mont Ventoux, but this came towards the beginning of the stage and was followed by more than 120 kilometres (75 mi) of roads to the finish. The crucial stages were expected to be the final two: Stage 6 finished on the Madone d'Utelle, a 15.3 kilometres (9.5 mi) climb at 5.7%. The final stage included six categorised climbs, with the Col d'Èze the final climb before the descent into Nice for the finish on the Promenade des Anglais.

While Stage 3 was underway, the weather conditions became very poor, with snow on the final climb. After attempting to restart the race, the race organisers cancelled the stage, with Amaury Sport Organisation's Christian Prudhomme saying "The road was very slippery and safe conditions could not be assured."

Stage schedule
Stage	Date	Route	Distance	Type	Winner
Prologue	6 March	Conflans-Sainte-Honorine	6.1 km (4 mi)	Individual time trial	Michael Matthews (AUS)
1	7 March	Condé-sur-Vesgre to Vendôme	198 km (123 mi)	Flat stage	Arnaud Démare (FRA)
2	8 March	Contres to Commentry	214 km (133 mi)	Flat stage	Michael Matthews (AUS)
3	9 March	Cusset to Mont Brouilly	166.5 km (103 mi)	Medium-mountain stage	cancelled due to snow
4	10 March	Julienas to Romans-sur-Isère	193.5 km (120 mi)	Flat stage	Nacer Bouhanni (FRA)
5	11 March	Saint-Paul-Trois-Châteaux to Salon-de-Provence	198 km (123 mi)	Medium-mountain stage	Alexey Lutsenko (KAZ)
6	12 March	Nice to Madone d'Utelle	177 km (110 mi)	Mountain stage	Ilnur Zakarin (RUS)
7	13 March	Nice to Nice	141 km (88 mi)	Medium-mountain stage	Tim Wellens (BEL)

== Pre-race favourites ==
Stages 1, 2 and 4 were expected to favour the sprinters, with the other stages likely to be decisive for the general classification. There were a large number of climbers present for Paris–Nice, but the overwhelming favourite was Alberto Contador (Tinkoff), racing in what was possibly his final season in the peloton. Contador had won the race on two previous occasions, but this was his first participation since 2010. Contador had shown some form with a stage win in the Volta ao Algarve. Contador was the only one of the top four Grand Tour contenders to start Paris–Nice: Vincenzo Nibali (Astana) was riding Tirreno–Adriatico, while Chris Froome (Team Sky) and Nairo Quintana (Movistar Team) opted to wait until the Volta a Catalunya to begin their European seasons.

The defending champion was Richie Porte (BMC Racing Team) who had won the 2015 Paris–Nice after winning the individual time trial on the final day; he had also won the 2013 edition. Since his 2015 victory, Porte had moved from Team Sky to BMC. In the absence of the traditional Col d'Èze time trial, the route was expected to favour him less than previous editions, but his strength in the mountains meant that he was still one of the major favourites. After a strong beginning to the season at the Tour Down Under, Porte had struggled in the Tour of Oman. Porte was replaced as Team Sky's leader for the race by Geraint Thomas, who had finished fifth the previous year. Thomas had won the Volta ao Algarve and was expected to perform strongly in the prologue time trial.

The other major general classification riders included Tom Dumoulin (Team Giant–Alpecin), Jon Izagirre (Movistar Team), Andrew Talansky and Pierre Rolland (both Cannondale) and Romain Bardet (AG2R La Mondiale).

Among the sprinters, the biggest name was Marcel Kittel (Etixx–Quick-Step), who had won four stages so far in the season as well as the overall title in the Dubai Tour. Other prominent sprinters included André Greipel (Lotto–Soudal), Alexander Kristoff (Team Katusha), Arnaud Démare (FDJ) and Nacer Bouhanni (Cofidis).

== Stages ==
=== Prologue ===
6 March 2016 — Conflans-Sainte-Honorine, 6.1 km (3.8 mi) individual time trial (ITT)

The prologue was a 6.1-kilometre (3.8 mi) individual time trial in Conflans-Sainte-Honorine. It began on the bank of the Seine with a 2-kilometre (1.2 mi) straight road. There was then a sharp left-hand turn as the road turned away from the river; there were then several more corners and two roundabouts before the end of the stage. The riders set off at one-minute intervals with Porte, the defending champion, the last to set off.

The riders who started earlier in the day were affected by rain. As the final riders set off, Cannondale's Patrick Bevin was in the lead, with a time of 7' 41". Tom Dumoulin beat this by one second, but was in turn beaten by one second by Michael Matthews, the seventh-last rider to take to the course. The final riders, including Porte and Geraint Thomas, were unable to beat Matthews's time. Thomas finished seventh, losing seven seconds to Matthews, with Porte eleventh, a further three seconds back. Contador finished 27th, sixteen seconds behind Matthews, with Talansky and Bardet finishing even further behind. Matthews described it as "very special" to beat Dumoulin, one of the best time-triallists in the world, and said that he hoped to stay in the yellow jersey of the race leader "as long as possible".

Prologue result and general classification
Rank	Rider	Team	Time
1	Michael Matthews (AUS)	Orica–GreenEDGE	7' 39"
2	Tom Dumoulin (NED)	Team Giant–Alpecin	+ 1"
3	Patrick Bevin (NZL)	Cannondale	+ 2"
4	Jesús Herrada (ESP)	Movistar Team	+ 6"
5	Jon Izagirre (ESP)	Movistar Team	+ 6"
6	Lieuwe Westra (NED)	Astana	+ 7"
7	Geraint Thomas (GBR)	Team Sky	+ 7"
8	Dries Devenyns (BEL)	IAM Cycling	+ 8"
9	Sylvain Chavanel (FRA)	Direct Énergie	+ 9"
10	Jérôme Coppel (FRA)	IAM Cycling	+ 9"

=== Stage 1 ===
7 March 2016 — Condé-sur-Vesgre to Vendôme, 198 km (123.0 mi)

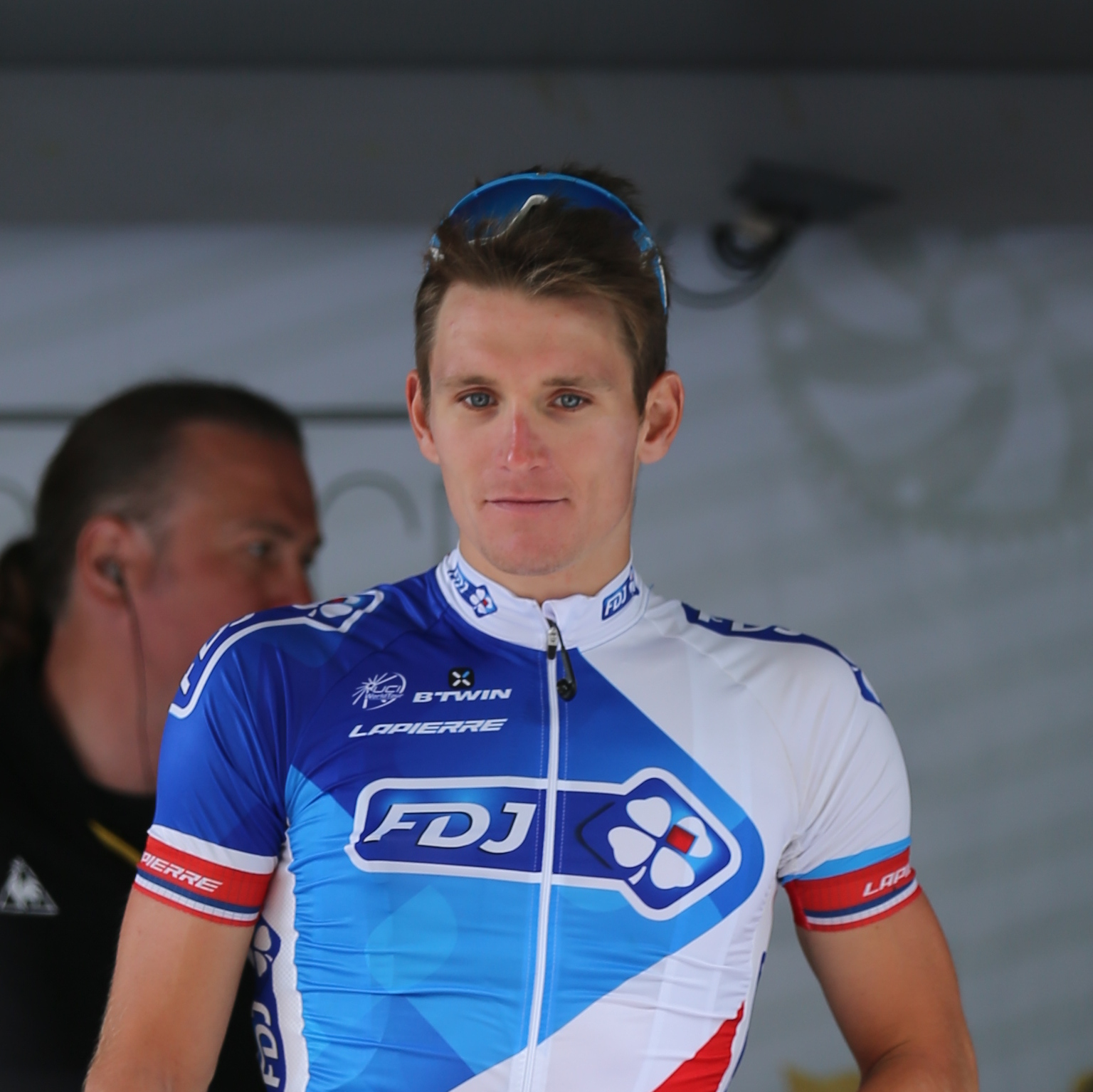
Arnaud Démare (FDJ), winner of Stage 1 (photographed in 2015)

Stage 1 was a broadly flat stage that covered a 198-kilometre (123 mi) route from Condé-sur-Vesgre to Vendôme. There were no classified climbs in the first 173 kilometres (107 mi). The final 25 kilometres (16 mi), however, followed a circuit around Vendôme that included both climbs and gravel roads. The riders entered the circuit half-way round. They crossed the first gravel sector, the Chemin de Tourteline, then the Chemin du Tertre de la Motte. The second sector included a third-category climb. There were just over 3 kilometres (1.9 mi) to the finish line at the end of the second sector. The riders then rode a complete lap of the circuit, crossing both gravel roads and the climb a second time, before reaching the stage finish. The stage took place in difficult conditions, with snow, rain, wind and cold temperatures.

The stage began with a four-man breakaway, formed by Thomas De Gendt (Lotto–Soudal), Steven Tronet (Fortuneo–Vital Concept), Thierry Hupond (Delko–Marseille Provence KTM) and Perrig Quéméneur (Direct Énergie). With the peloton not trying hard to chase them, they built a ten-minute lead by the middle of the stage. In the second half of the stage, there was some sunshine, but also strong crosswinds: with Sky, Tinkoff and Etixx–Quick-Step working hard at the front of the peloton, there were splits in the group. Alexander Kristoff was in the second group on the road, but he was able to get back to the front as the groups came together.

On the first gravel section, the breakaway's lead had been reduced to ten seconds and they were soon caught with Sky's Luke Rowe working at the front of the peloton. Pierre-Luc Périchon (Fortuneo–Vital Concept) attacked on the first time over the climb; he was caught by work from Orica–GreenEDGE as the riders rode through Vendôme. On the second lap, Marcel Kittel was dropped on the final climb and, despite an attack from Tony Gallopin (Lotto–Soudal) that was followed by Geraint Thomas, a large group crossed the final climb together. Around 2 kilometres (1.2 mi) from the finish, Edward Theuns (Trek–Segafredo) attacked and went under the flamme rouge alone. He was caught, however, by Sky. Sky's Ben Swift was the first to sprint and came close to taking the victory, but he was passed by Démare in the final metres, with Bouhanni finishing third.

Michael Matthews increased his lead by winning two bonus seconds at an intermediate sprint. After finishing fifth at the end of the stage, he retained the yellow jersey; there were no significant changes to the general classification. Démare said that the stage victory was "an immense relief" after he had failed to win any races in 2015.

Result of Stage 1
Rank	Rider	Team	Time
1	Arnaud Démare (FRA)	FDJ	4h 29' 53"
2	Ben Swift (GBR)	Team Sky	+ 0"
3	Nacer Bouhanni (FRA)	Cofidis	+ 0"
4	Adrien Petit (FRA)	Direct Énergie	+ 0"
5	Michael Matthews (AUS)	Orica–GreenEDGE	+ 0"
6	Tom Boonen (BEL)	Etixx–Quick-Step	+ 0"
7	Sep Vanmarcke (BEL)	LottoNL–Jumbo	+ 0"
8	Simon Geschke (GER)	Team Giant–Alpecin	+ 0"
9	Jonas van Genechten (BEL)	IAM Cycling	+ 0"
10	Geraint Thomas (GBR)	Team Sky	+ 0"

General classification after Stage 1
Rank	Rider	Team	Time
1	Michael Matthews (AUS)	Orica–GreenEDGE	4h 37' 30"
2	Tom Dumoulin (NED)	Team Giant–Alpecin	+ 3"
3	Patrick Bevin (NZL)	Cannondale	+ 4"
4	Jon Izagirre (ESP)	Movistar Team	+ 8"
5	Geraint Thomas (GBR)	Team Sky	+ 8"
6	Lieuwe Westra (NED)	Astana	+ 9"
7	Dries Devenyns (BEL)	IAM Cycling	+ 10"
8	Richie Porte (AUS)	BMC Racing Team	+ 12"
9	Arnaud Démare (FRA)	FDJ	+ 14"
10	Wilco Kelderman (NED)	LottoNL–Jumbo	+ 15"

=== Stage 2 ===
8 March 2016 — Contres to Commentry, 213.5 km (132.7 mi)

The second road stage was held on a 213.5-kilometre (132.7 mi) route from Contres in Loir-et-Cher to Commentry in Allier. The route was flat for almost the entire stage, with only one third-category climb that came 50 kilometres (31 mi) from the finish line. After the peloton reached Commentry, there was a lap of a 17-kilometre (11 mi) circuit with a small, uncategorised climb. The final kilometres were slightly uphill, with a 90-degree turn at a roundabout 500 metres (550 yd) from the finish line.

There was again a four-main breakaway at the beginning of the stage, with Evaldas Šiškevičius (Delko–Marseille Provence KTM), Anthony Delaplace (Fortuneo–Vital Concept), Matthias Brändle (IAM Cycling) and Tsgabu Grmay (Lampre–Merida) earning a 10-minute lead by the time they had raced 20 kilometres (12 mi). This was quickly reduced to under four minutes, however, by Etixx–Quick-Step and Orica–GreenEDGE. On the climb, Delaplace won the maximum points. Grmay dropped out of the break with 30 kilometres (19 mi) remaining and as the riders reached Commentry the breakaway had just a 40-second lead.

Šiškevičius and Brändle attacked at the start of the final lap, with Delaplace unable to follow, but with 10 kilometres (6.2 mi) remaining they were caught by the peloton. In the final 2 kilometres (1.2 mi), Cofidis came to the front on behalf of Bouhanni and gave him a good lead-out. Bouhanni followed the wheel of Christophe Laporte and opened his sprint with 200 metres (220 yd) remaining. He was on the right-hand side of the road, with Michael Matthews coming up on his left. In the final 100 metres (330 ft), Bouhanni drifted to the left and leaned into Matthews; the two riders nearly crashed. Bouhanni crossed the line first, with Matthews just beating Niccolò Bonifazio (Trek–Segafredo) for second place, but the result was changed shortly after the stage. Bouhanni was relegated to third place after the jury decided that he had driven the sprint dangerously, giving Matthews the stage victory and putting Bonifazio into second. Alexander Kristoff led the rest of the field home, one second behind. Marcel Kittel, one of the favourites for the stage victory, finished 65th.

Result of Stage 2
Rank	Rider	Team	Time
1	Michael Matthews (AUS)	Orica–GreenEDGE	5h 04' 26"
2	Niccolò Bonifazio (ITA)	Trek–Segafredo	+ 0"
3	Nacer Bouhanni (FRA)	Cofidis	+ 0"
4	Alexander Kristoff (NOR)	Team Katusha	+ 1"
5	Arnaud Démare (FRA)	FDJ	+ 1"
6	Ben Swift (GBR)	Team Sky	+ 1"
7	André Greipel (GER)	Lotto–Soudal	+ 1"
8	Wouter Wippert (NED)	Cannondale	+ 1"
9	Adrien Petit (FRA)	Direct Énergie	+ 1"
10	Jonas van Genechten (BEL)	IAM Cycling	+ 1"

General classification after Stage 2
Rank	Rider	Team	Time
1	Michael Matthews (AUS)	Orica–GreenEDGE	9h 41' 46"
2	Tom Dumoulin (NED)	Team Giant–Alpecin	+ 14"
3	Patrick Bevin (NZL)	Cannondale	+ 19"
4	Jon Izagirre (ESP)	Movistar Team	+ 19"
5	Geraint Thomas (GBR)	Team Sky	+ 19"
6	Lieuwe Westra (NED)	Astana	+ 24"
7	Dries Devenyns (BEL)	IAM Cycling	+ 25"
8	Arnaud Démare (FRA)	FDJ	+ 25"
9	Rafał Majka (POL)	Tinkoff	+ 27"
10	Richie Porte (AUS)	BMC Racing Team	+ 27"

=== Stage 3 ===
9 March 2016 — Cusset to Mont Brouilly, 168 km (104.4 mi)

The third stage was scheduled to follow a 168-kilometre (104 mi) route that took the riders east from Cusset in Allier to the climb of Mont Brouilly in Rhône. The route crossed five categorised climbs in the first 120 kilometres (75 mi), then entered a circuit that took the riders on two climbs of Mont Brouilly, a 3-kilometre (1.9 mi) climb at 7.7% with the final 1,000 metres (1,100 yd) at 9.3%.

A group of sixteen riders escaped early in the stage. Alexis Gougeard (AG2R La Mondiale) attacked along with Laurent Didier (Trek–Segafredo) and Alexey Lutsenko (Astana). They were joined by Jesús Herrada (Movistar Team) and Thomas De Gendt (Lotto–Soudal) as the rest of the group was caught by the peloton. The stage took place in cold, wintry conditions, with increasing quantities of snow falling and temperatures as low as −5 °C (23 °F) recorded. At the top of the third climb of the day was the feedzone and the racing was suspended there. It was initially intended to restart some way down the road, but several minutes later the decision was taken to neutralise the stage. The results did not count for the general classification, but points were awarded for the intermediate sprints and mountains that had already been contested.

=== Stage 4 ===
10 March 2016 — Juliénas to Romans-sur-Isère, 195.5 km (121.5 mi)

Stage 4 took the peloton 195.5 kilometres (121.5 mi) south from Juliénas in Rhône to Romans-sur-Isère in the Drôme department. There were three categorised climbs in the stage: two third-category and one second-category. The final climb came 22.5 kilometres (14.0 mi) from the finish.

The early breakaway included four riders. These were Thomas Voeckler (Direct Énergie), Matthew Brammeier (Dimension Data), Florian Vachon (Fortuneo–Vital Concept) and Evaldas Šiškevičius (Delko–Marseille Provence KTM). They were not allowed to build a large advantage, with the peloton keeping them just a few minutes ahead. The main action of the day came on the second-category final climb. In the breakaway, now just a minute ahead, Voeckler attacked and dropped the other breakaway riders. Nathan Haas (Dimension Data) attacked the peloton at the top of the climb, but made a mistake on a corner and ended up in a field. On the climb, Marcel Kittel and Arnaud Démare were dropped, with Démare then pulling out of the race. Geraint Thomas was one of several riders to crash on the climb, but he was able to return to the peloton.

After the climb, with Voeckler being caught, Sylvain Chavanel (Direct Énergie), Sep Vanmarcke (LottoNL–Jumbo) and Delio Fernández (Delko–Marseille Provence KTM) attacked and built a lead; with 7 kilometres (4.3 mi) remaining they had a 15-second lead. Katusha and Cofidis rode very hard in the peloton to bring them back, but the breakaway was finally caught with less than 1 kilometre (0.62 mi) remaining. Cofidis again gave Bouhanni a strong lead-out and he comfortably won the sprint. Edward Theuns (Trek–Segafredo) finished second, with Greipel third. Matthews finished fifth to retain his lead of both the general and points classifications. Bouhanni said after the stage that his victory made up for his disqualification on stage 3.

Result of Stage 4
Rank	Rider	Team	Time
1	Nacer Bouhanni (FRA)	Cofidis	4h 42' 29"
2	Edward Theuns (BEL)	Trek–Segafredo	+ 0"
3	André Greipel (GER)	Lotto–Soudal	+ 0"
4	Alexander Kristoff (NOR)	Team Katusha	+ 0"
5	Michael Matthews (AUS)	Orica–GreenEDGE	+ 0"
6	Ben Swift (GBR)	Team Sky	+ 0"
7	Nikolas Maes (BEL)	Etixx–Quick-Step	+ 0"
8	Tony Gallopin (FRA)	Lotto–Soudal	+ 0"
9	Youcef Reguigui (ALG)	Team Dimension Data	+ 0"
10	Roy Curvers (NED)	Team Giant–Alpecin	+ 0"

General classification after Stage 4
Rank	Rider	Team	Time
1	Michael Matthews (AUS)	Orica–GreenEDGE	14h 24' 15"
2	Tom Dumoulin (NED)	Team Giant–Alpecin	+ 14"
3	Patrick Bevin (NZL)	Cannondale	+ 19"
4	Jon Izagirre (ESP)	Movistar Team	+ 19"
5	Geraint Thomas (GBR)	Team Sky	+ 19"
6	Lieuwe Westra (NED)	Astana	+ 24"
7	Dries Devenyns (BEL)	IAM Cycling	+ 25"
8	Rafał Majka (POL)	Tinkoff	+ 27"
9	Richie Porte (AUS)	BMC Racing Team	+ 27"
10	Tim Wellens (BEL)	Lotto–Soudal	+ 28"

=== Stage 5 ===
11 March 2016 — Saint-Paul-Trois-Châteaux to Salon-de-Provence, 198 km (123.0 mi)

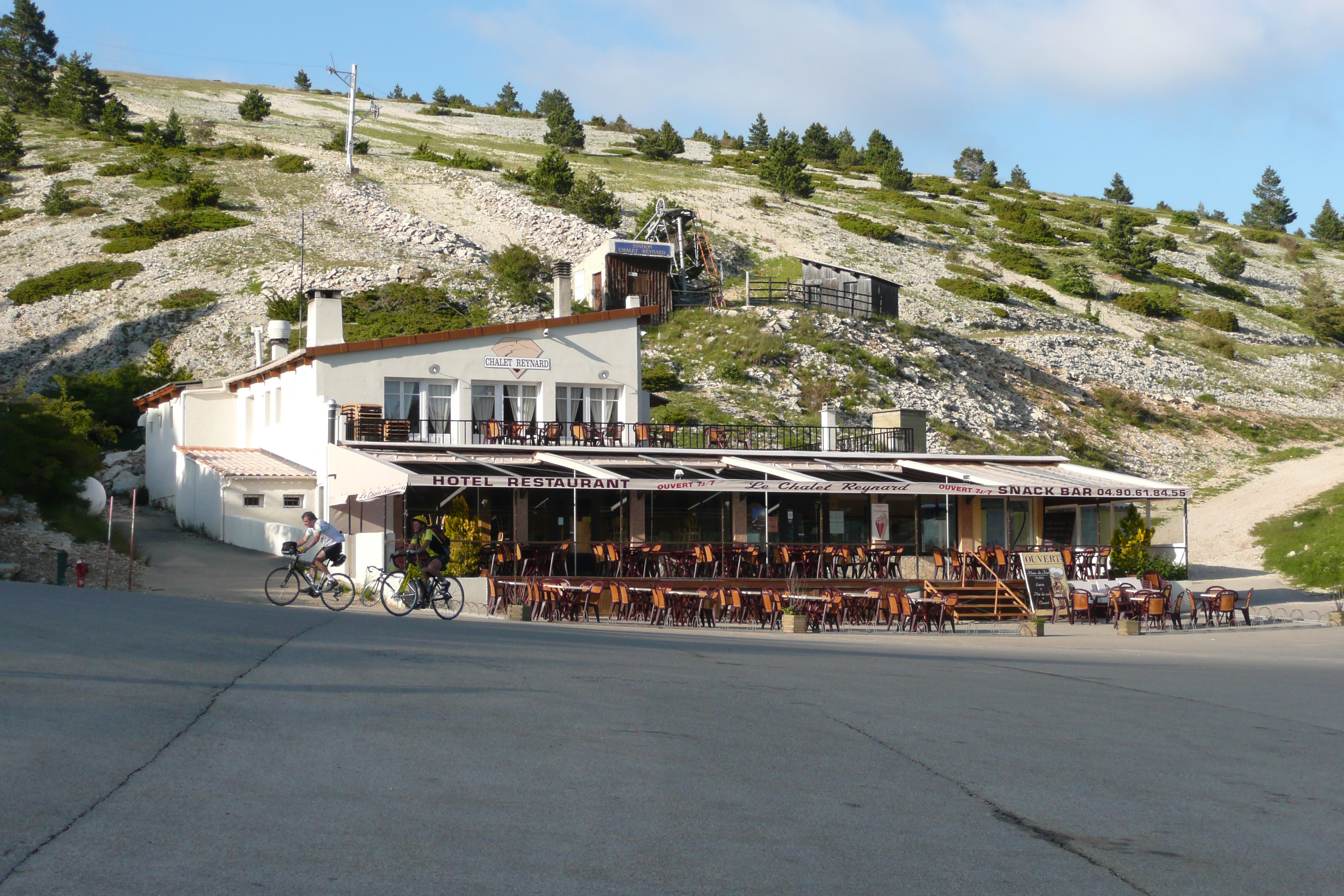
On Stage 5, the climb of Mont Ventoux finished at Chalet Reynard, midway up the mountain

The fifth road stage followed a 198-kilometre (123 mi) route from Saint-Paul-Trois-Châteaux to Salon-de-Provence in Bouches-du-Rhône. The stage included five climbs, the most significant of which was the partial climb of Mont Ventoux. This was a first-category climb, taking the riders 9.5 kilometres (5.9 mi) at an average gradient of 9.3%. Rather than riding all the way to the summit, the riders descended after Chalet Reynard. This climb came with more than 125 kilometres (78 mi) remaining in the stage. Before Mont Ventoux was a third-category climb; afterwards there were three second-category climbs. The last of these came with 38.5 kilometres (23.9 mi) to the finish line; this last section was mostly flat, although there were two sharp left-hand turns in the final 1,000 metres (1,100 yd).

The early breakaway included Stijn Vandenbergh (Etixx–Quick-Step), Arnaud Courteille (FDJ), Lars Boom (Astana), Wouter Wippert (Cannondale), Edward Theuns (Trek–Segafredo), Matthias Brändle (IAM), Antoine Duchesne (Direct Énergie) and Jesús Herrada (Movistar). In the first 30 kilometres (19 mi), their lead extended to over eleven minutes. On the climb of Mont Ventoux, Brändle was dropped from the breakaway, while Bouhanni, Kittel and Greipel were among those dropped from the peloton. Greipel was among seven riders to drop out during the stage. Wippert and Theuns were next to be dropped from the breakaway; Boom and Vandenbergh were also temporarily dropped but were able to rejoin the front group, although the group's lead was reduced to just over three minutes by the third climb of the day. Herrada won the first two climbs of the day and came second on the following two to take the lead in the mountains classification, then dropped back to the peloton.

Duchesne attacked on the penultimate climb, the Côte de la Roque-d'Anthéron, and had a 33-second lead over the peloton. On the descent from the final climb, Alexey Lutsenko (Astana) attacked from the peloton and came across to Duchesne. Lutsenko quickly dropped him and, with 15 kilometres (9.3 mi) remaining, had built a 39-second lead, putting him into the virtual lead of the race. The chase only began in earnest in the final 3 kilometres (1.9 mi), with Katusha chasing on behalf of Alexander Kristoff, but the peloton were unable to catch Lutsenko and he crossed the line for a solo victory, 21 seconds ahead of the chasing group. Kristoff won the sprint for second, with Matthews finishing third. Lutsenko moved into second place overall, six seconds behind Matthews.

After the stage, Matthews said that he felt he could win the overall general classification. He said, "I think if I can survive Saturday [Stage 5], I can win. With the way I’ve been climbing, I think it's possible." Contador, meanwhile, said that the final climb of Stage 6 was not very steep and that it might be difficult to put significant time into Matthews.

Result of Stage 5
Rank	Rider	Team	Time
1	Alexey Lutsenko (KAZ)	Astana	5h 00' 26"
2	Alexander Kristoff (NOR)	Team Katusha	+ 21"
3	Michael Matthews (AUS)	Orica–GreenEDGE	+ 21"
4	Davide Cimolai (ITA)	Lampre–Merida	+ 21"
5	Sep Vanmarcke (BEL)	LottoNL–Jumbo	+ 21"
6	Pieter Serry (BEL)	Etixx–Quick-Step	+ 21"
7	Vicente Reynés (ESP)	IAM Cycling	+ 21"
8	Leonardo Duque (COL)	Delko–Marseille Provence KTM	+ 21"
9	Oliver Naesen (BEL)	IAM Cycling	+ 21"
10	Arnold Jeannesson (FRA)	Cofidis	+ 21"

General classification after Stage 5
Rank	Rider	Team	Time
1	Michael Matthews (AUS)	Orica–GreenEDGE	19h 24' 58"
2	Alexey Lutsenko (KAZ)	Astana	+ 6"
3	Tom Dumoulin (NED)	Team Giant–Alpecin	+ 18"
4	Patrick Bevin (NZL)	Cannondale	+ 23"
5	Jon Izagirre (ESP)	Movistar Team	+ 23"
6	Geraint Thomas (GBR)	Team Sky	+ 23"
7	Lieuwe Westra (NED)	Astana	+ 28"
8	Dries Devenyns (BEL)	IAM Cycling	+ 29"
9	Rafał Majka (POL)	Tinkoff	+ 31"
10	Richie Porte (AUS)	BMC Racing Team	+ 31"

=== Stage 6 ===
12 March 2016 — Nice to Madone d'Utelle, 177 km (110.0 mi)

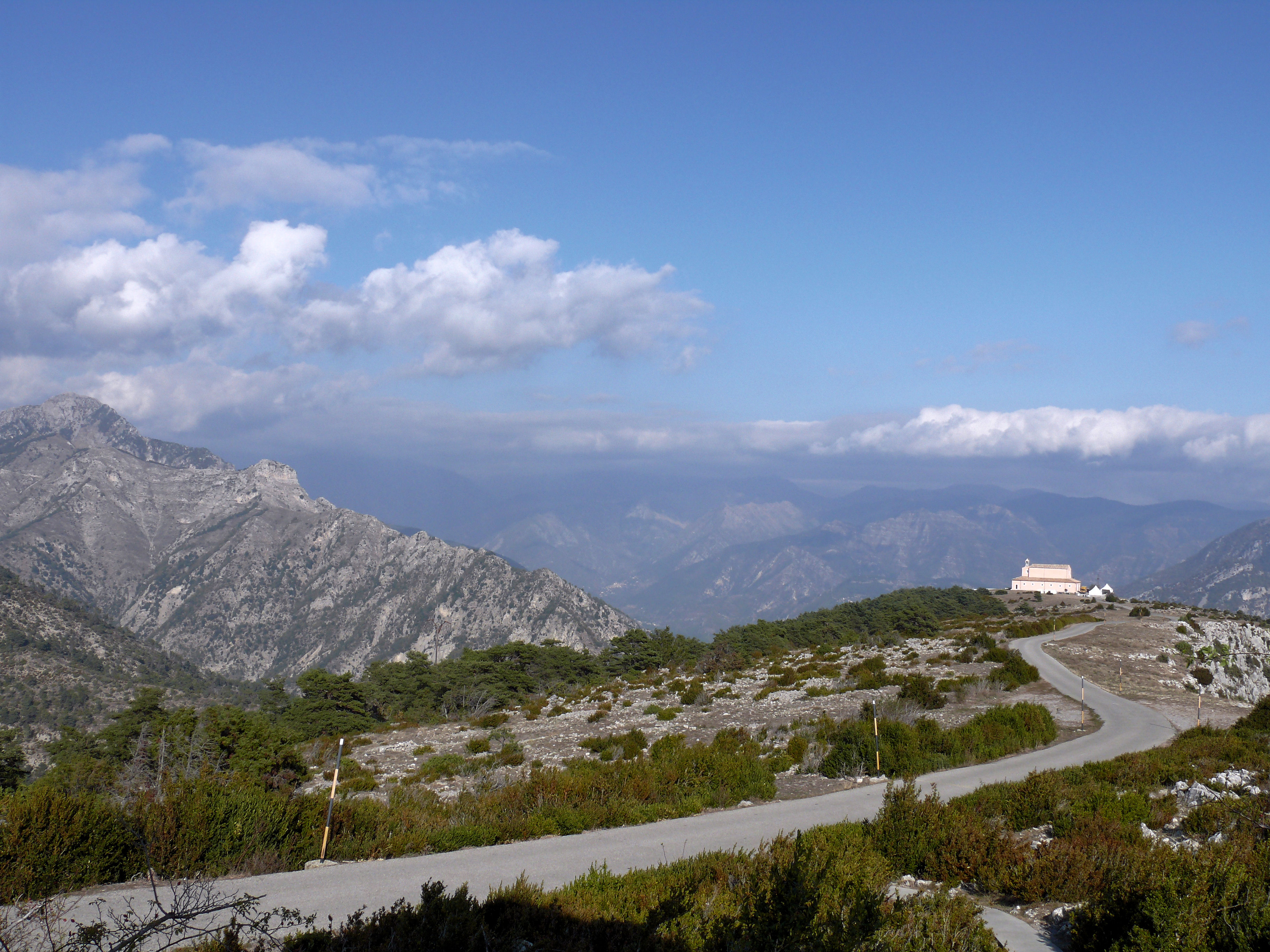
The summit of the climb of the Madone d'Utelle. The riders approached the summit from the far side.

The penultimate stage of the race took the riders 177 kilometres (110 mi) through the Alpes-Maritimes. The route started on the Promenade des Anglais in Nice, then left the city to the north for a course that included seven categorised climbs. The first 50 kilometres (31 mi) of racing crossed two second-category climbs, which were followed by a 35-kilometre (22 mi) section of flat roads and descents. This was followed by another second-category climb and a first-category climb, the 8.5-kilometre (5.3 mi) Côte d'Ascros with its average gradient of 5.4%. After a long descent came two more second-category climbs, bringing the riders to Utelle. They had a summit finish at the shrine of the Madone d'Utelle above the city, with a 15.3-kilometre (9.5 mi) climb at an average gradient of 5.7%. The climb was fairly regular, but had two sections above 9%, including the final 300 metres (330 yd).

The day's breakaway included nine riders. These were Antoine Duchesne (Direct Énergie), Florian Vachon (Fortuneo–Vital Concept), Niki Terpstra (Etixx–Quick-Step), Cyril Gautier (AG2R La Mondiale), Grégory Rast (Trek–Segafredo), Evaldas Šiškevičius (Delko–Marseille Provence KTM), Tsgabu Grmay (Lampre–Merida), Andrew Talansky (Cannondale) and Thomas De Gendt (Lotto–Soudal). The gap never exceeded two and a half minutes, with Tinkoff chasing hard on behalf of Contador and, with 55 kilometres (34 mi) remaining, was just one minute. De Gendt won the first four climbs to move into second in the mountains classification, while Rast and Šiškevičius were dropped. Talansky crashed on one of the descents and abandoned the race with a wrist injury. Vachon and Duchesne dropped the rest of the breakaway and continued alone, but with 35 kilometres (22 mi) Duchesne was left alone, just over a minute ahead of the peloton. He won the fifth and sixth climbs of the day and moved into the lead of the mountains classification.

As the riders approached the final climb of the day, Sky came to the front of the peloton. With 15 kilometres (9.3 mi) remaining, Duchesne was caught, and the peloton was reduced to 30 riders. Matthews, the race leader, was among those dropped from the leading group. With 10 kilometres (6.2 mi) remaining, Rafał Majka (Tinkoff) attacked, with Contador following; this caused the group to halve in size and Sky were reduced to two riders, Thomas and Sergio Henao. Porte, Dumoulin, Izagirre, Bardet and Katusha's Ilnur Zakarin were among those left in the group. With 5.5 kilometres (3.4 mi) remaining, Majka pulled off and a group of five leaders formed: Contador, Thomas, Henao, Porte and Zakarin. Contador and Porte attempted attacks but were unable to escape the group, with Henao supporting Thomas. In the final kilometre, Porte was dropped and Zakarin accelerated. Thomas and Contador followed, but Zakarin took the stage victory. Thomas finished second, on the same time as Zakarin, and Contador was a second back in third. Thomas therefore moved into the race lead, fifteen seconds ahead of Contador.

Result of Stage 6
Rank	Rider	Team	Time
1	Ilnur Zakarin (RUS)	Team Katusha	4h 45' 11"
2	Geraint Thomas (GBR)	Team Sky	+ 0"
3	Alberto Contador (ESP)	Tinkoff	+ 1"
4	Richie Porte (AUS)	BMC Racing Team	+ 7"
5	Sergio Henao (COL)	Team Sky	+ 10"
DSQ	~~Simon Yates~~ (GBR)	~~Orica–GreenEDGE~~	~~+ 20"~~
7	Rui Costa (POR)	Lampre–Merida	+ 31"
8	Romain Bardet (FRA)	AG2R La Mondiale	+ 31"
9	Jon Izagirre (ESP)	Movistar Team	+ 31"
10	Tony Gallopin (FRA)	Lotto–Soudal	+ 31"

General classification after Stage 6
Rank	Rider	Team	Time
1	Geraint Thomas (GBR)	Team Sky	24h 10' 26"
2	Alberto Contador (ESP)	Tinkoff	+ 15"
3	Ilnur Zakarin (RUS)	Team Katusha	+ 20"
4	Richie Porte (AUS)	BMC Racing Team	+ 21"
5	Tom Dumoulin (NED)	Team Giant–Alpecin	+ 32"
6	Jon Izagirre (ESP)	Movistar Team	+ 37"
7	Sergio Henao (COL)	Team Sky	+ 39"
DSQ	~~Simon Yates~~ (GBR)	~~Orica–GreenEDGE~~	~~+ 44"~~
9	Tony Gallopin (FRA)	Lotto–Soudal	+ 51"
10	Romain Bardet (FRA)	AG2R La Mondiale	+ 1' 00"

=== Stage 7 ===
13 March 2016 — Nice to Nice, 134 km (83.3 mi)

Profile of Stage 7

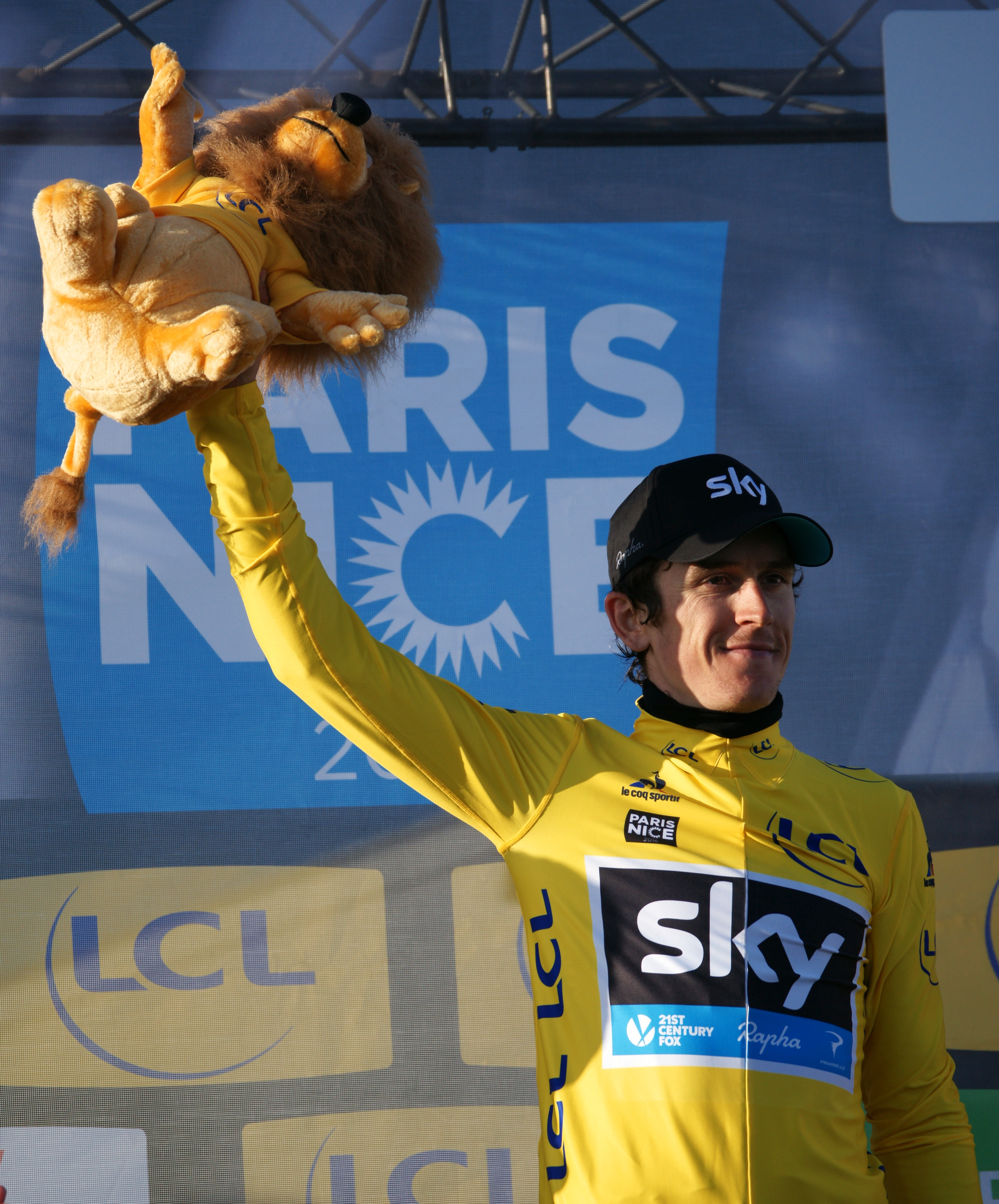
Geraint Thomas (Team Sky), wearing the yellow jersey of the race leader

The final stage was a 134-kilometre (83 mi) loop that started and ended on the Promenade des Anglais in Nice. The route took the riders out of Nice to the north. They crossed two third-category climbs, then came back south for two second-category climbs. The final 64 kilometres (40 mi) included two first-category climbs. The first was the Côte de Peille, a 6.5-kilometre (4.0 mi) climb at 6.9%. The riders then descended into the outskirts of Nice. Here they turned back inland for a final climb, the 7.7 kilometres (4.8 mi) of the Col d'Èze at an average gradient of 5.7%. They then descended back into Nice, where the final 2 kilometres (1.2 mi) were fairly flat, before ended on the Promenade des Anglais at the Albert I Garden.

The stage began with an 18-rider breakaway within the first five minutes of racing. This included Contador's teammate Robert Kišerlovski and this group was joined shortly afterwards by several more riders, including Yuri Trofimov, another Tinkoff rider, while others were dropped and returned to the peloton. Thomas De Gendt and Antoine Duchesne were again in the breakaway; Duchesne won the first four climbs of the day, with De Gendt second on each occasion. Duchesne won enough points to secure victory in the mountains classification.

On the Côte de Peille, Contador attacked in the peloton. He quickly built an advantage, with Kiserlovski and Trofimov dropping back from the breakaway to assist him. They built a lead of around a minute, but Team Sky pulled the lead back and Contador's group was caught by the foot of the Col d'Èze, with only Tim Wellens (Lotto–Soudal) ahead. Romain Bardet attacked, but Contador chased him down. Contador himself attacked several times, with Sky's Sergio Henao and the Orica–GreenEDGE team chasing him down; Thomas appeared to be struggling. In the final part of the climb, Contador got away, initially with Majka and then with Richie Porte. At the top of the climb, they caught Wellens and had a 30-second advantage over the chasing group.

Thomas had been dropped not only by Contador but also by the first chasing group, which included Ilnur Zakarin. Thomas was joined, however, by Sergio Henao. The two Sky riders then joined up with Tony Gallopin (Lotto–Soudal) and chased hard throughout the 15-kilometre (9.3 mi) descent. They caught the first chasing group on the descent, forming a ten-man group behind Contador, Porte and Wellens. The gap was gradually reduced and was just five seconds by the finish. Wellens won the three-man sprint, with Contador second and Porte third. Gallopin won the sprint for fourth place. Thomas therefore won the overall general classification, beating Contador by four seconds.

Result of Stage 7
Rank	Rider	Team	Time
1	Tim Wellens (BEL)	Lotto–Soudal	3h 16' 09"
2	Alberto Contador (ESP)	Tinkoff	+ 0"
3	Richie Porte (AUS)	BMC Racing Team	+ 0"
4	Tony Gallopin (FRA)	Lotto–Soudal	+ 5"
DSQ	~~Simon Yates~~ (GBR)	~~Orica–GreenEDGE~~	~~+ 5"~~
6	Arnold Jeannesson (FRA)	Cofidis	+ 5"
7	Rui Costa (POR)	Lampre–Merida	+ 5"
8	Jesús Herrada (ESP)	Movistar Team	+ 5"
9	Romain Bardet (FRA)	AG2R La Mondiale	+ 5"
10	Jon Izagirre (ESP)	Movistar Team	+ 5"

Final general classification
Rank	Rider	Team	Time
1	Geraint Thomas (GBR)	Team Sky	27h 26' 40"
2	Alberto Contador (ESP)	Tinkoff	+ 4"
3	Richie Porte (AUS)	BMC Racing Team	+ 12"
4	Ilnur Zakarin (RUS)	Team Katusha	+ 20"
5	Jon Izagirre (ESP)	Movistar Team	+ 37"
6	Sergio Henao (COL)	Team Sky	+ 44"
DSQ	~~Simon Yates~~ (GBR)	~~Orica–GreenEDGE~~	~~+ 44"~~
8	Tony Gallopin (FRA)	Lotto–Soudal	+ 51"
9	Romain Bardet (FRA)	AG2R La Mondiale	+ 1' 00"
10	Rui Costa (POR)	Lampre–Merida	+ 1' 07"

== Post-race analysis ==
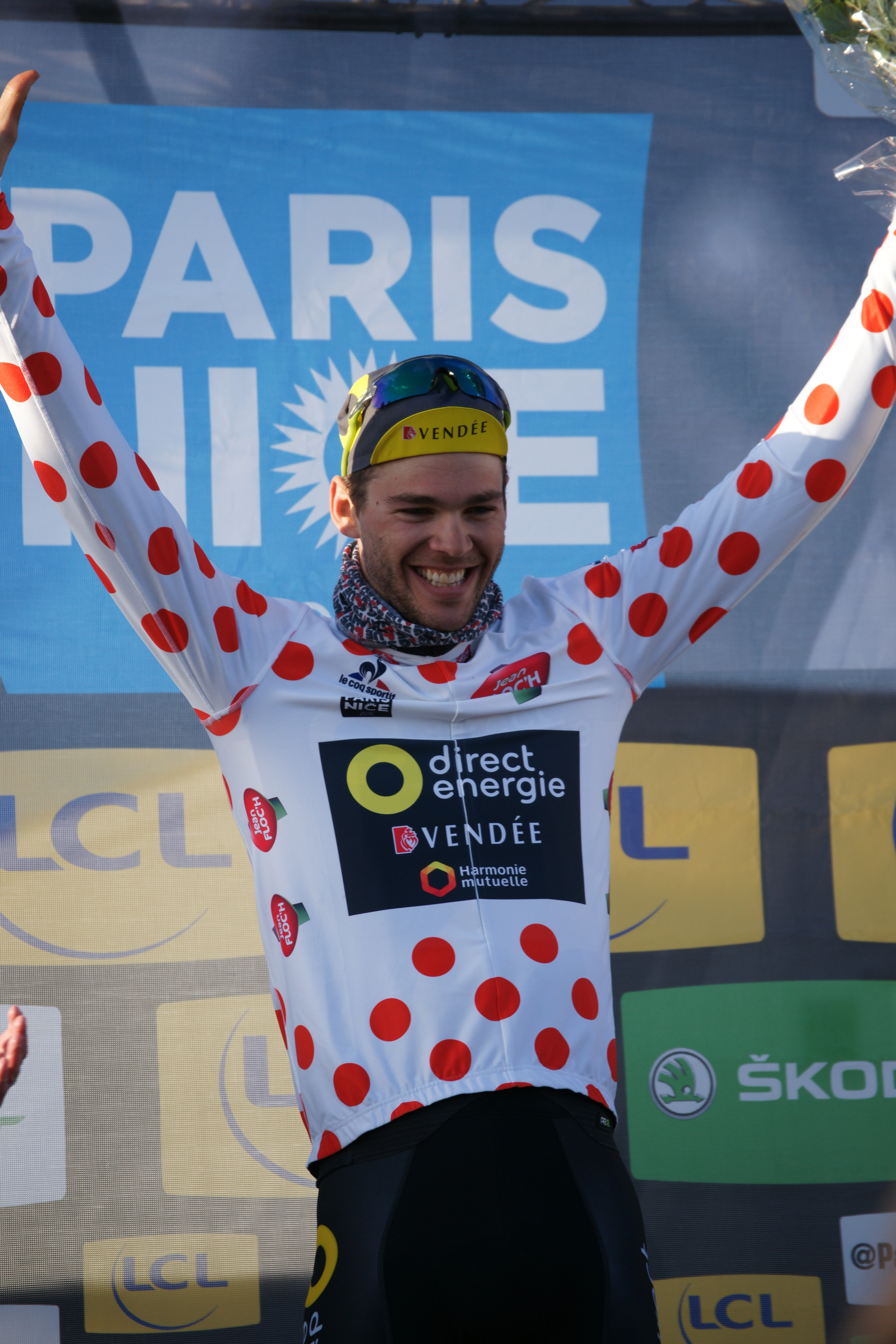
Antoine Duchesne (Direct Énergie), wearing the polka dot jersey of the winner of the mountains classification

Thomas said after the race that his victory demonstrated that he could compete with the top stage racers in the world. He said that Henao's presence had been crucial to his victory and that, before the stage, he had chosen a 54-tooth chainring to help him chase back on if he was dropped on the final climb. He also said that he owed Gallopin "a few beers" for his assistance in chasing back to the leading groups on the final stage. Gallopin, meanwhile said that he had been happy to contribute to the chase of the second group on the final stage in order to have both a man in the leading group and in the chasing group. He added that he was also glad to help Thomas as the two men were friends and exchanged text messages whenever Thomas's Wales played Gallopin's France at rugby.

Contador's approach to Stage 7 was described by Cycling Weekly as a "tactical masterpiece". Contador himself said that the team had executed their strategy perfectly. His directeur sportif, Sean Yates, said that the team were "nearly there" in their attempt to take the overall victory and suggested that the cancellation of Stage 3 may have prevented Contador from winning the race. Richie Porte said that his performance, especially in the final stage, had given him confidence going into the rest of the season. He said that he had not been sure of his form going into the stage and that it was a good sign for the future, as Paris–Nice had been very difficult.

=== UCI World Tour standings ===
Porte's third-place finish was his second consecutive podium place in the season-long UCI World Tour competition, following his second-place finish at the Tour Down Under. He moved up into first place overall, while Henao moved up from third to second, with the previous leader, Simon Gerrans (Orica–GreenEDGE) dropping to third. Thomas moved into fourth and Contador into fifth, with Zakarin and Izagirre also moving into the top ten. Australia remained top of the nations' ranking, while Sky moved to the top of the teams' ranking.

UCI World Tour standings on 13 March 2016
Rank	Rider	Team	Points
1	Richie Porte (AUS)	BMC Racing Team	159
2	Sergio Henao (COL)	Team Sky	115
3	Simon Gerrans (AUS)	Orica–GreenEDGE	112
4	Geraint Thomas (GBR)	Team Sky	104
5	Alberto Contador (ESP)	Tinkoff	86
6	Jay McCarthy (AUS)	Tinkoff	68
7	Ilnur Zakarin (RUS)	Team Katusha	66
8	Michael Woods (CAN)	Cannondale	54
9	Jon Izagirre (ESP)	Movistar Team	51
10	Rubén Fernández (ESP)	Lampre–Merida	40

== Classification leadership table ==
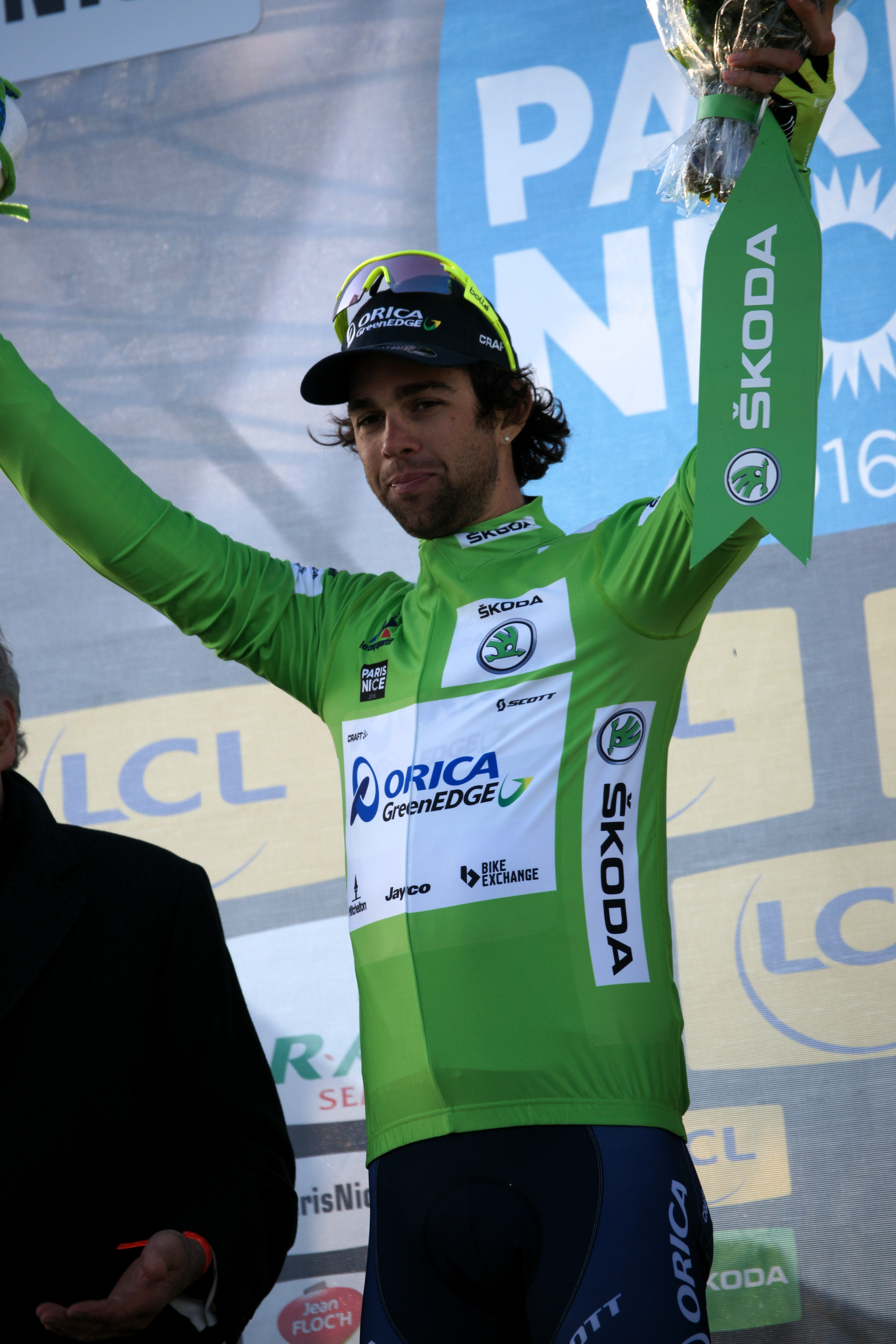
Michael Matthews, wearing the green jersey as leader of the points classification after Stage 6

In the 2016 Paris–Nice, three jerseys were awarded. The general classification was calculated by adding each cyclist's finishing times on each stage. Time bonuses were awarded to the first three finishers on road stages (Stages 1–7): the stage winner won a ten-second bonus, with six and four seconds for the second and third riders respectively. Bonus seconds were also awarded to the first three riders at intermediate sprints (three seconds for the winner of the sprint, two seconds for the rider in second and one second for the rider in third). The leader of the general classification received a yellow jersey.

Points for stage victory
Position	1	2	3	4	5	6	7	8	9	10
Points awarded	15	12	9	7	6	5	4	3	2	1

The second classification was the points classification. Riders were awarded points for finishing in the top ten in a stage. Unlike in the points classification in the Tour de France, the winners of all stages were awarded the same number of points. Points were also won in intermediate sprints; three points for crossing the sprint line first, two points for second place, and one for third. The leader of the points classification was awarded a green jersey.

There was also a mountains classification, in which points were awarded for reaching the top of a climb before other riders. Each climb was categorised as either first, second, or third-category, with more points available for the more difficult, higher-categorised climbs. For first-category climbs, the top seven riders earned points; on second-category climbs, five riders won points; on third-category climbs, only the top three riders earned points. The leadership of the mountains classification was marked by a white jersey with red polka-dots.

There was also a classification for teams, in which the times of the best three cyclists in a team on each stage were added together; the leading team at the end of the race was the team with the lowest cumulative time.

Stage	Winner	General classification	Points classification	Mountains classification	Teams classification
P	Michael Matthews	Michael Matthews	Michael Matthews	not awarded	Movistar Team
1	Arnaud Démare	Michael Matthews	Michael Matthews	Jon Izagirre	Movistar Team
2	Michael Matthews	Michael Matthews	Michael Matthews	Jon Izagirre	Movistar Team
3	Stage cancelled	Michael Matthews	Michael Matthews	Jon Izagirre	Movistar Team
4	Nacer Bouhanni	Michael Matthews	Michael Matthews	Evaldas Šiškevičius	Movistar Team
5	Alexey Lutsenko	Michael Matthews	Michael Matthews	Jesús Herrada	Astana Pro Team
6	Ilnur Zakarin	Geraint Thomas	Michael Matthews	Antoine Duchesne	Team Sky
7	Tim Wellens	Geraint Thomas	Michael Matthews	Antoine Duchesne	Movistar Team
Final		Geraint Thomas	Michael Matthews	Antoine Duchesne	Movistar Team

- In stage one, Tom Dumoulin, who was second in the points classification, wore the green jersey, because Michael Matthews wore the yellow jersey as leader of the general classification.
- In stages two, three and four, Arnaud Démare, who was second in the points classification, wore the green jersey, because Matthews wore the yellow jersey.
- In stages five and six, Nacer Bouhanni, who was second in the points classification, wore the green jersey, because Matthews wore the yellow jersey.
