= Thenay =

Thenay may refer to the following places in France:

- Thenay, Indre, a commune in the Indre department
- Thenay, Loir-et-Cher, a commune in the Loir-et-Cher department
