= Feings =

Feings may refer to the following places in France:

- Feings, Loir-et-Cher, a commune in the Loir-et-Cher department
- Feings, Orne, a commune in the Orne department
