= Château de Fougères-sur-Bièvre =

Castle in Fougères-sur-Bièvre, France

Coordinates: 47°26′52″N 1°20′37″E

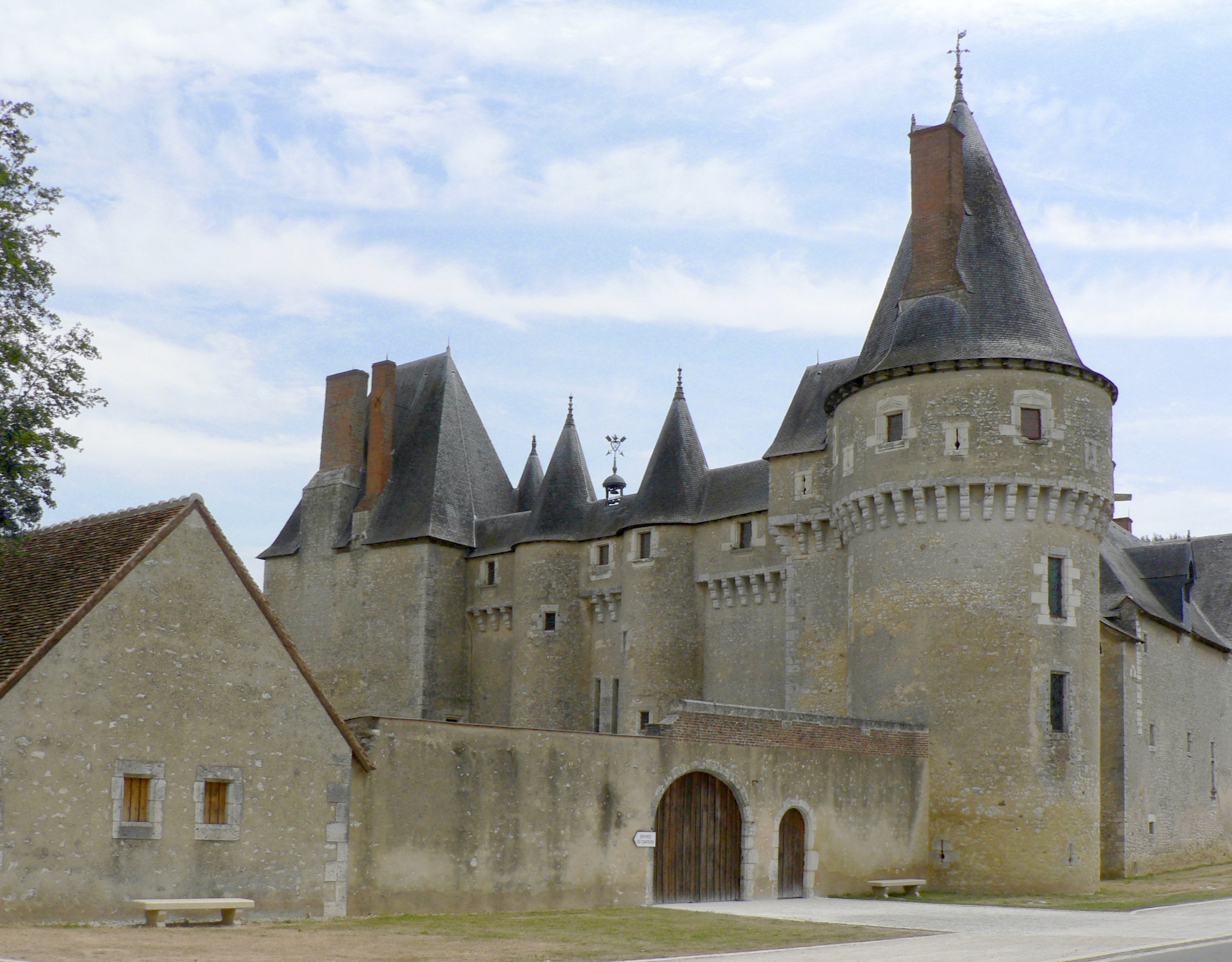
Château de Fougères-sur-Bièvre

The Château de Fougères-sur-Bièvre is a castle in the commune of Fougères-sur-Bièvre, in the French department of Loir-et-Cher.

Originally an 11th-century structure, it was entirely rebuilt at the end of the 15th century, with only the large, square keep remaining original. The initial reconstruction retained the defensive aspect of the castle: moat, openings for cannon, parapet walk, etc. During the next century, Renaissance refinements, such as a gallery, mullioned windows and steep-sloped roofs were added. During the 19th century, a spinning mill was installed in the chapel. The castle was purchased and restored by the state in the 1930s.

It has been listed since 1912 as a historic monument by the French Ministry of Culture.

== See also ==
- List of castles in France
