= Le Controis-en-Sologne =

- Commune
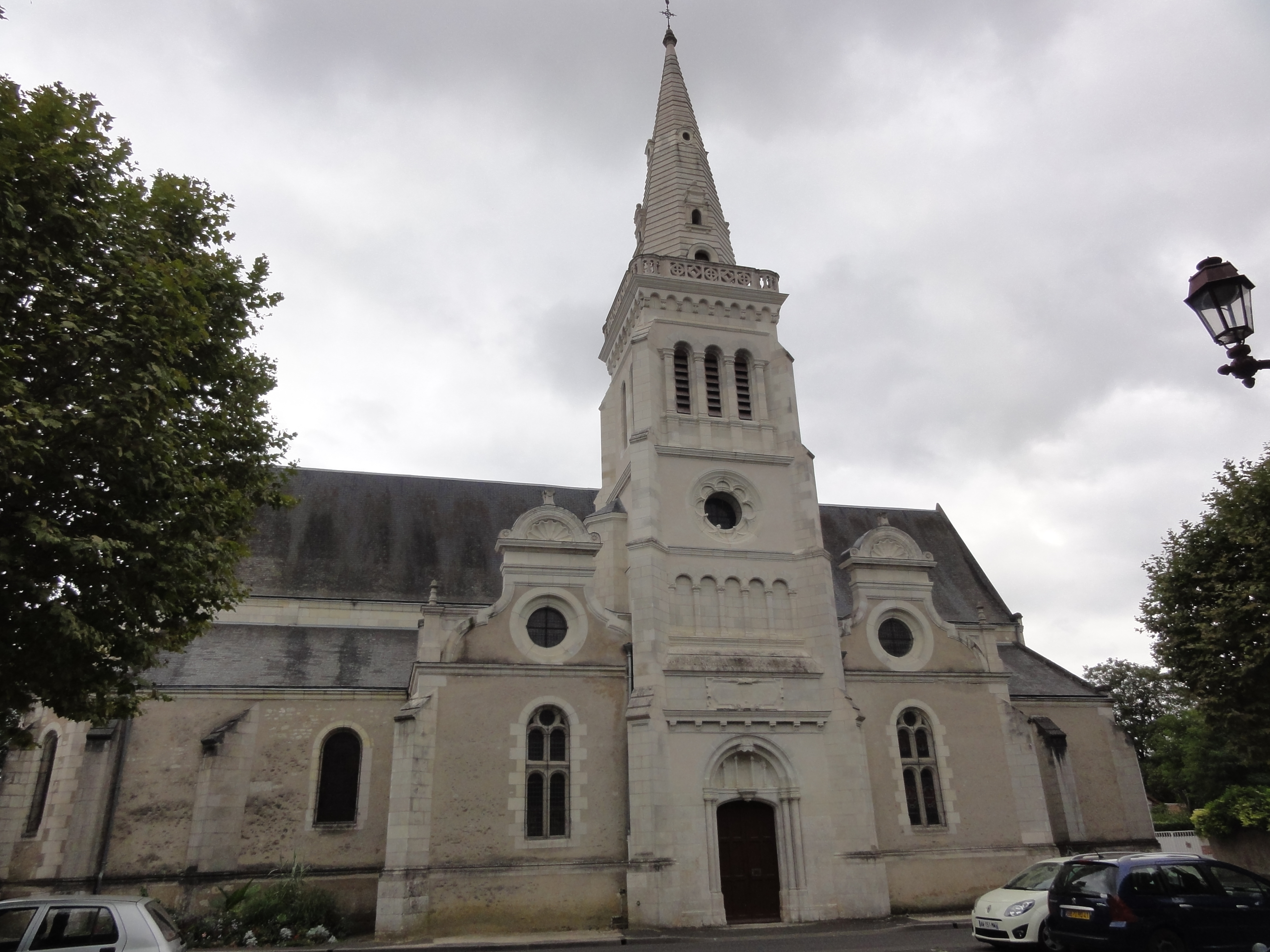
- Church of Saint-Cyr and Sainte-Julitte in Contres
- Location of Le Controis-en-Sologne
- Location within France Location within Centre-Val de Loire
- Coordinates: 47°25′11″N 1°25′43″E
- Country: France
- Region: Centre-Val de Loire
- Department: Loir-et-Cher
- Arrondissement: Romorantin-Lanthenay
- Canton: Montrichard Val de Cher and Blois-3
- Intercommunality: Val-de-Cher-Controis

Government
  - Mayor (2022–2026): Antoine Lelarge
- Area^{1}: 100.41 km^{2} (38.77 sq mi)
- Highest elevation: 129 m (423 ft)
- Lowest elevation: 62 m (203 ft)
- Population (2023): 6,860
  - Density: 68.3/km^{2} (177/sq mi)
- Time zone: UTC+01:00 (CET)
  - Summer (DST): UTC+02:00 (CEST)
- INSEE/Postal code: 41059 /41700
- ^{1} French Land Register data, which excludes lakes, ponds, glaciers > 1 km^{2} (0.386 sq mi or 247 acres) and river estuaries.

Le Controis-en-Sologne (French pronunciation: [lə kɔ̃tʁwa ɑ̃ sɔlɔɲ], literally Le Controis in Sologne) is a commune in the French department Loir-et-Cher, administrative region of Centre-Val de Loire. It was established on 1 January 2019 by merger of the former communes of Contres (the seat), Feings, Fougères-sur-Bièvre, Ouchamps and Thenay.

== Population ==
Population data refer to the commune in its geography as of January 2025.

Historical population
Year	Pop.	±% p.a.
1968	5,247	—
1975	5,070	−0.49%
1982	5,367	+0.82%
1990	5,499	+0.30%
1999	6,056	+1.08%
2007	6,505	+0.90%
2012	6,656	+0.46%
2017	6,866	+0.62%
2023	6,860	−0.01%
Source: INSEE

== See also ==
- Communes of the Loir-et-Cher department
