= Fougères-sur-Bièvre =

- Part of Le Controis-en-Sologne
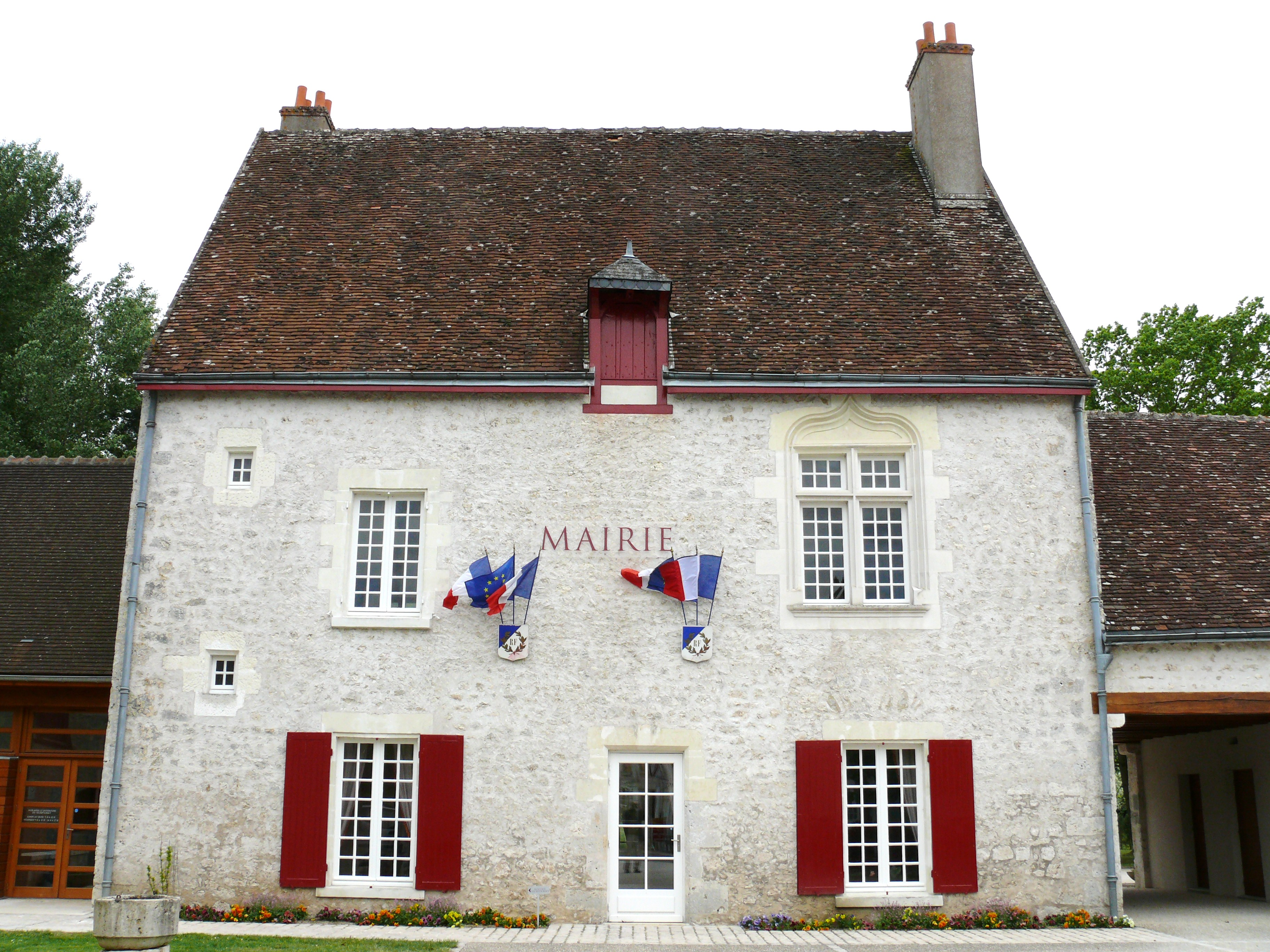
- Town hall
- Location of Fougères-sur-Bièvre
- Location within France Location within Centre-Val de Loire
- Coordinates: 47°26′55″N 1°20′37″E
- Country: France
- Region: Centre-Val de Loire
- Department: Loir-et-Cher
- Arrondissement: Romorantin-Lanthenay
- Canton: Blois-3
- Commune: Le Controis-en-Sologne
- Area^{1}: 14.69 km^{2} (5.67 sq mi)
- Elevation: 110 m (360 ft)
- Highest elevation: 121 m (397 ft)
- Lowest elevation: 78 m (256 ft)
- Population (2023): 798
  - Density: 54.3/km^{2} (141/sq mi)
- Time zone: UTC+01:00 (CET)
  - Summer (DST): UTC+02:00 (CEST)
- Postal code: 41120
- ^{1} French Land Register data, which excludes lakes, ponds, glaciers > 1 km^{2} (0.386 sq mi or 247 acres) and river estuaries.

Fougères-sur-Bièvre (French pronunciation: [fuʒɛʁ syʁ bjɛvʁ]) is a former commune in the Loir-et-Cher department of central France. On 1 January 2019, it was merged into the new commune Le Controis-en-Sologne.

== See also ==
- Château de Fougères-sur-Bièvre
- Communes of the Loir-et-Cher department
