= Ouchamps =

- Part of Le Controis-en-Sologne
- Coat of arms
- Location of Ouchamps
- Location within France Location within Centre-Val de Loire
- Coordinates: 47°28′24″N 1°18′32″E
- Country: France
- Region: Centre-Val de Loire
- Department: Loir-et-Cher
- Arrondissement: Romorantin-Lanthenay
- Canton: Blois-3
- Commune: Le Controis-en-Sologne
- Area^{1}: 13.08 km^{2} (5.05 sq mi)
- Elevation: 100 m (330 ft)
- Highest elevation: 114 m (374 ft)
- Lowest elevation: 62 m (203 ft)
- Population (2023): 742
  - Density: 56.7/km^{2} (147/sq mi)
- Time zone: UTC+01:00 (CET)
  - Summer (DST): UTC+02:00 (CEST)
- Postal code: 41120
- ^{1} French Land Register data, which excludes lakes, ponds, glaciers > 1 km^{2} (0.386 sq mi or 247 acres) and river estuaries.

Ouchamps (French pronunciation: [uʃɑ̃]) is a former commune in the Loir-et-Cher department of central France. On 1 January 2019, it was merged into the new commune Le Controis-en-Sologne.

== See also ==
- Communes of the Loir-et-Cher department
