= 2010 Paris–Nice =

2010 UCI World Ranking, race 2 of 26

Race details
- Dates: 7–14 March 2010
- Stages: 7+Prologue
- Distance: 1,268.5 km (788.2 mi)
- Winning time: 28h 35' 35"

Results
Jersey awarded to the overall winner	Winner	Alberto Contador (ESP)	(Astana)
	Second	Luis León Sánchez (Note: After removal of Alejandro Valverde, see lead paragraph.) (ESP)	(Caisse d'Epargne)
	Third	Roman Kreuziger (CZE)	(Liquigas–Doimo)
Jersey awarded to the points classification winner	Points	Peter Sagan (SVK)	(Liquigas–Doimo)
Jersey awarded to the mountains classification winner	Mountains	Amaël Moinard (FRA)	(Cofidis)
Jersey awarded to the youth classification winner	Youth	Roman Kreuziger (CZE)	(Liquigas–Doimo)
	Team	Ag2r–La Mondiale	

The 2010 Paris–Nice was the 68th running of the Paris–Nice cycling stage race, often known as the Race to the Sun. It started on 7 March and ended on 14 March in Nice and consisted of a prologue time-trial and seven stages. Alberto Contador of Spain won the race, regaining the title he had won in 2007. Alejandro Valverde finished second, but his results during 2010 were expunged as part of the terms of his suspension for involvement in the 2006 Operación Puerto doping case.

== Teams ==
22 teams were invited to the 2010 Paris–Nice, including 16 of the 18 ProTour teams, and both teams that had lost that status at the end of the preceding season. The teams were:

- Ag2r–La Mondiale
- Astana
- Bbox Bouygues Telecom
- Caisse d'Epargne
- Cervélo TestTeam
- Cofidis
- Euskaltel–Euskadi
- Française des Jeux
- Garmin–Transitions
- Lampre–Farnese Vini
- Liquigas–Doimo
- Omega Pharma–Lotto
- Quick-Step
- Rabobank
- Saur–Sojasun
- Skil–Shimano
- Team HTC–Columbia
- Team Katusha
- Team RadioShack
- Team Saxo Bank
- Team Sky
- Vacansoleil

== Route ==
Stage characteristics and winners
Stage	Date	Course	Distance	Type	Winner
P	7 March	Montfort-l'Amaury	8 km (5.0 mi)	Individual time trial	Lars Boom (NED)
1	8 March	Saint-Arnoult-en-Yvelines to Contres	201.5 km (125.2 mi)	Flat stage	Greg Henderson (NZL)
2	9 March	Contres to Limoges	201 km (125 mi)	Hilly stage	William Bonnet (FRA)
3	10 March	Saint-Junien to Aurillac	155 km (96 mi) (Note: Stage 3 was shortened by 53 km (33 mi), from 208 km (129 mi), due to snow.)	Hilly stage	Peter Sagan (SVK)
4	11 March	Maurs to Mende	173.5 km (107.8 mi)	Medium mountain stage	Alberto Contador (ESP)
5	12 March	Pernes-les-Fontaines to Aix-en-Provence	157 km (98 mi)	Hilly stage	Peter Sagan (SVK)
6	13 March	Peynier to Tourrettes-sur-Loup	220 km (140 mi)	Medium mountain stage	Xavier Tondo (ESP)
7	14 March	Nice to Nice	119 km (74 mi)	Mountain stage	Amaël Moinard (FRA)

== Stages ==
=== Prologue ===
7 March 2010 — Montfort-l'Amaury, 8 km (5.0 mi), (ITT)

The course for the prologue time trial was a relatively simple 8 km (5.0 mi) out-and-back ride through Montfort-l'Amaury. It was almost entirely flat, with one small categorized climb, to award the first polka dot jersey, coming after 1.5 km (0.93 mi). The course was not very technical, as it contained just two sharp turns.

Lars Boom and Peter Sagan, both former cyclo-cross specialists, posted strong times early in the day, with Boom 10 seconds the better of the two. Expecting to be beaten, Boom watched overall contenders like Levi Leipheimer, Alberto Contador, and defending champion Luis León Sánchez all fall short, giving the young Dutchman the win. Boom later said his cyclo-cross experience helped him, as the course covered several different types of terrain. The win gave Boom all four jerseys on the first podium – in his stead, Jens Voigt wore the green points jersey, Sagan the white youth classification jersey, and Alejandro Valverde the polka dot jersey for the mountains classification lead.

Prologue results and General Classification after the Prologue

	Cyclist	Team	Time
1	Lars Boom (NED)	Rabobank	10'56"
2	Jens Voigt (GER)	Team Saxo Bank	+ 3"
3	Levi Leipheimer (USA)	Team RadioShack	+ 6"
4	Alberto Contador (ESP)	Astana	+ 6"
5	Peter Sagan (SVK)	Liquigas–Doimo	+ 10"
6	Xavier Tondó (ESP)	Cervélo TestTeam	+ 10"
7	David Millar (GBR)	Garmin–Transitions	+ 11"
8	Luis León Sánchez (ESP)	Caisse d'Epargne	+ 12"
9	Roman Kreuziger (CZE)	Liquigas–Doimo	+ 13"
10	Samuel Sánchez (ESP)	Euskaltel–Euskadi	+ 15"

=== Stage 1 ===
8 March 2010 — Saint-Arnoult-en-Yvelines to Contres, 201.5 km (125.2 mi)

The first road race stage was a perfectly flat ride from Saint-Arnoult-en-Yvelines to Contres, heading due south.

What had the makings of a straightforward day of racing changed drastically in the final 3 km (1.9 mi), as strong crosswinds blasted the peloton. Many riders crashed, including Heinrich Haussler, Levi Leipheimer and Alberto Contador, with Contador's crash serious enough to leave him wondering if he could continue the race.

The principal breakaway of the day involved Philippe Gilbert and Tom Veelers. They broke away 5 km (3.1 mi) into the stage. Euskaltel–Euskadi had tried to place a rider in this breakaway attempt, but their team leader Samuel Sánchez had, incidentally, crashed moments earlier, meaning the squad had to rally around him. Gilbert and Veelers stood little chance of staying away for the stage win on such a flat course, and were caught 50 km (31 mi) from the finish line. After other ultimately inconsequential breakaway attempts that occurred after the catch, most of the peloton was together at the 3 km (1.9 mi) mark, when the strong winds started to blow. The winds, combined with a timely attack, made it so 15 riders gained 17 seconds on the rest of the field. Race leader Lars Boom was in this breakaway, as were overall contenders Luis León Sánchez and Alejandro Valverde. Contador and Leipheimer both missed the selection because of their crashes. Team Sky's Greg Henderson was easily the strongest sprinter in the selective final break, and took the stage win. Boom retained all four jerseys on the stage 1 podium, with Kreuziger assuming the white jersey in his stead and Voigt and Valverde continuing to wear the green and polka dot jerseys.

Stage 1 result

	Cyclist	Team	Time
1	Greg Henderson (NZL)	Team Sky	4h 22'17"
2	Grega Bole (SLO)	Lampre–Farnese Vini	s.t.
3	Jérémie Galland (FRA)	Saur–Sojasun	s.t.
4	Alexandr Kolobnev (RUS)	Team Katusha	s.t.
5	~~Alejandro Valverde (ESP)~~	~~Caisse d'Epargne~~	s.t.
6	Nicolas Roche (IRL)	Ag2r–La Mondiale	s.t.
7	Jens Voigt (GER)	Team Saxo Bank	s.t.
8	Marco Marcato (ITA)	Vacansoleil	s.t.
9	Tony Martin (GER)	Team HTC–Columbia	s.t.
10	Roman Kreuziger (CZE)	Liquigas–Doimo	s.t.

General Classification after Stage 1

	Cyclist	Team	Time
1	Lars Boom (NED)	Rabobank	4h 33' 11"
2	Jens Voigt (GER)	Team Saxo Bank	+ 5"
3	David Millar (GBR)	Garmin–Transitions	+ 13"
4	Luis León Sánchez (ESP)	Caisse d'Epargne	+ 14"
5	Roman Kreuziger (CZE)	Liquigas–Doimo	+ 15"
6	Greg Henderson (NZL)	Team Sky	+ 20"
7	Levi Leipheimer (USA)	Team RadioShack	+ 25"
8	Alberto Contador (ESP)	Astana	+ 25"
9	Peter Sagan (SVK)	Liquigas–Doimo	+ 29"
10	Xavier Tondó (ESP)	Cervélo TestTeam	+ 29"

=== Stage 2 ===
9 March 2010 — Contres to Limoges, 201 km (124.9 mi)

Stage 2 was mostly flat, but it included three third-category climbs, including the Côte de Maison Neuve at the 156 km (97 mi) mark, which had an average gradient of over 6%.

Another early breakaway took place on this stage, with the Dutch teams Vacansoleil and Skil–Shimano trying to prove their combativeness to the ASO to potentially get wildcard entries to the upcoming Tour de France. Vacansoleil's Jens Mouris and Skil–Shimano's Koen de Kort were joined by Liquigas-Doimo rider Mauro Finetto and Saur-Sojasun's Laurent Mangel. Their escape, which took form just 4 km (2.5 mi) into the stage. Their maximum advantage on the Caisse d'Epargned-led peloton was 4'15", and they were easily caught with 11 km (6.8 mi) left to race. Mangel was first over the first two climbs on the day, and took over possession of the polka dot jersey from race leader Lars Boom after the stage. Several teams tried to set up the sprint finish, but in the chaos a crash took place 500 m (1,600 ft) from the line, thinning the possibilities for stage winner (though all who crashed were awarded the same time as the stage winner). Peter Sagan was in first position on the road in sight of the finish line, but he was overhauled by Bbox Bouygues Telecom rider William Bonnet, giving that team its first win of the season on European soil. Boom retained the race leadership and the white jersey for the youth classification, and Kreuziger again wore the white jersey in his place. Luis León Sánchez, third on the stage, took ownership of the green jersey for the points classification.

Stage 2 result

	Cyclist	Team	Time
1	William Bonnet (FRA)	Bbox Bouygues Telecom	4h 22'40"
2	Peter Sagan (SVK)	Liquigas–Doimo	s.t.
3	Luis León Sánchez (ESP)	Caisse d'Epargne	s.t.
4	Mirco Lorenzetto (ITA)	Lampre–Farnese Vini	s.t.
5	Juan José Haedo (ARG)	Team Saxo Bank	s.t.
6	Samuel Dumoulin (FRA)	Cofidis	s.t.
7	Tom Veelers (NED)	Skil–Shimano	s.t.
8	Eduard Vorganov (RUS)	Team Katusha	s.t.
9	Borut Božič (SLO)	Vacansoleil	s.t.
10	Francesco Chicchi (ITA)	Liquigas–Doimo	s.t.

General Classification after Stage 2

	Cyclist	Team	Time
1	Lars Boom (NED)	Rabobank	8h 55' 51"
2	Jens Voigt (GER)	Team Saxo Bank	+ 5"
3	Luis León Sánchez (ESP)	Caisse d'Epargne	+ 10"
4	David Millar (GBR)	Garmin–Transitions	+ 13"
5	Roman Kreuziger (CZE)	Liquigas–Doimo	+ 15"
6	Greg Henderson (NZL)	Team Sky	+ 20"
7	Peter Sagan (SVK)	Liquigas–Doimo	+ 23"
8	Levi Leipheimer (USA)	Team RadioShack	+ 25"
9	Alberto Contador (ESP)	Astana	+ 25"
10	Xavier Tondó (ESP)	Cervélo TestTeam	+ 29"

=== Stage 3 ===
10 March 2010 — Saint-Junien to Aurillac, 208 km (129 mi)

This course, as originally designed, was undulating, with six categorized climbs. The first half contained three third-category climbs, all with gradients lesser than 6%. The second half of the course contained three second-category climbs, with the Côte de Sexcles at 300 m (980 ft) in ascent and 6.4% grade and the shorter but steeper Côte de la Martinie just before the finish. A quick 3 km (1.9 mi) stretch of descending followed the Côte de la Martinie before the finish line.

Due to snow in and around Saint-Junien, the start of the third stage was moved by 53 km (33 mi), to Saint-Yrieix-la-Perche. Therefore, the first two categorized climbs (category 3) were left out of the stage.

Three riders broke away 33 km (21 mi) into the stage. Once again, a Skil–Shimano rider was among them, on this day Yann Huguet. Jürgen Roelandts and Nikolas Maes joined him, and they built a seven-minute advantage by the 67 km (42 mi) mark. The gap slowly fell from that point, and after Huguet and Roelandts dropped Maes they were caught with 6 km (3.7 mi) left. Six riders counterattacked on the way up the Côte de la Martinie, with Nicolas Roche and Peter Sagan instigating the move. Team HTC–Columbia reacted quickly, with André Greipel pacing Tony Martin into the break. They were also joined by Jens Voigt, Joaquim Rodríguez, and Alberto Contador. Contador pulled the group through the 1 km (0.62 mi) to go mark before pulling up and finishing 2 seconds back of stage winner Sagan. Voigt assumed the overall race leadership. Sagan took both the green and white jerseys on the podium after the stage; his teammate Roman Kreuziger wore the white jersey in the next stage.

Stage 3 result

	Cyclist	Team	Time
1	Peter Sagan (SVK)	Liquigas–Doimo	3h 44'28"
2	Joaquim Rodríguez (ESP)	Team Katusha	s.t.
3	Nicolas Roche (IRE)	Ag2r–La Mondiale	s.t.
4	Jens Voigt (GER)	Team Saxo Bank	+ 2"
5	Tony Martin (GER)	Team HTC–Columbia	+ 2"
6	Alberto Contador (ESP)	Astana	+ 2"
7	Mirco Lorenzetto (ITA)	Lampre–Farnese Vini	+ 6"
8	Samuel Dumoulin (FRA)	Cofidis	+ 6"
9	Xavier Florencio (ESP)	Cervélo TestTeam	+ 6"
10	Marco Marcato (ITA)	Vacansoleil	+ 6"

General Classification after Stage 3

	Cyclist	Team	Time
1	Jens Voigt (GER)	Team Saxo Bank	12h 40' 26"
2	Peter Sagan (SVK)	Liquigas–Doimo	+ 6"
3	Luis León Sánchez (ESP)	Caisse d'Epargne	+ 9"
4	David Millar (GBR)	Garmin–Transitions	+ 12"
5	Roman Kreuziger (CZE)	Liquigas–Doimo	+ 14"
6	Lars Boom (NED)	Rabobank	+ 20"
7	Alberto Contador (ESP)	Astana	+ 20"
8	Levi Leipheimer (USA)	Team RadioShack	+ 24"
9	Joaquim Rodríguez (ESP)	Team Katusha	+ 28"
10	Xavier Tondó (ESP)	Cervélo TestTeam	+ 28"

=== Stage 4 ===
11 March 2010 — Maurs to Mende, 173.5 km (107.8 mi)

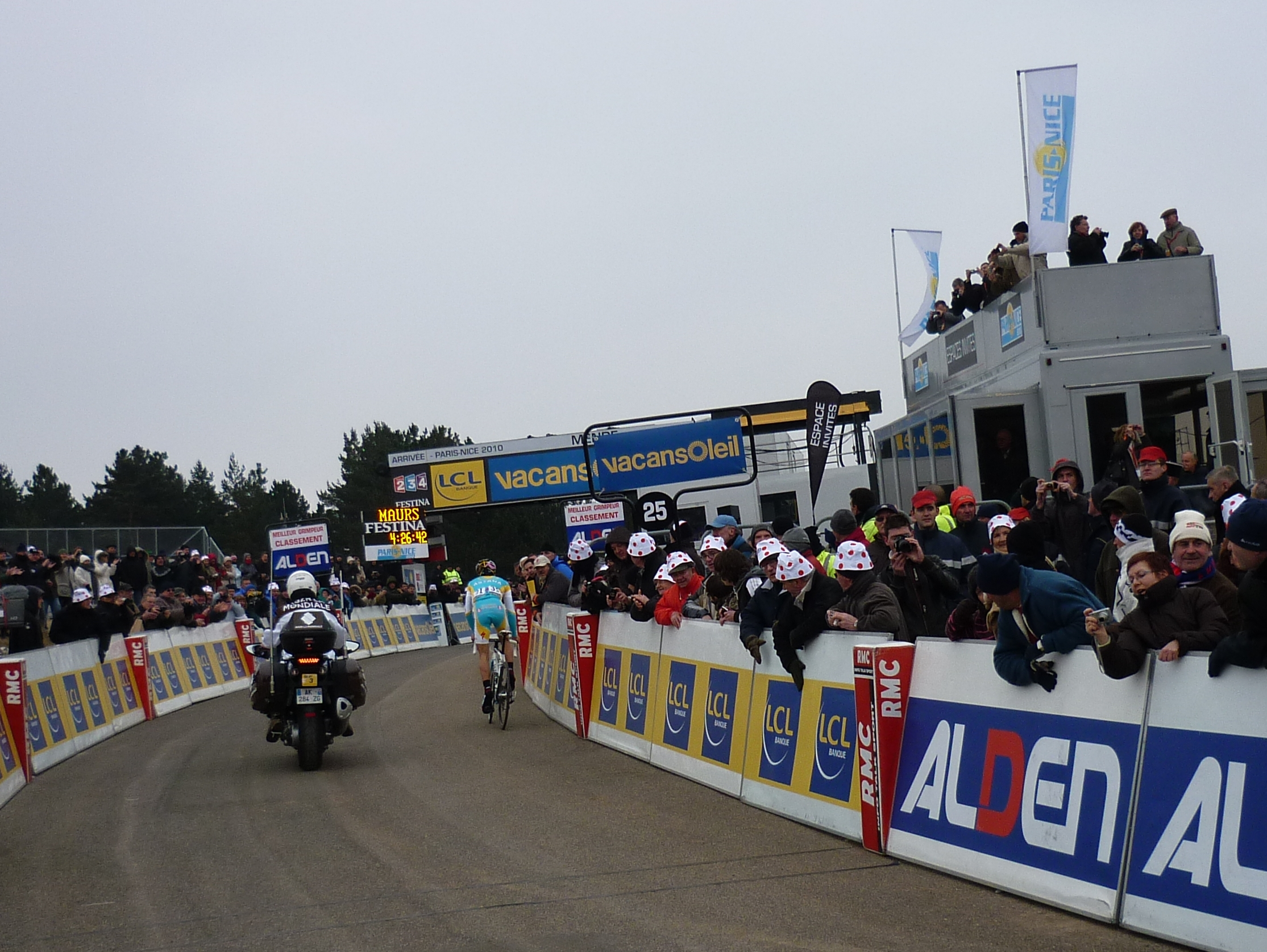
Alberto Contador approaches the finish line in Mende, where he would take the stage win and the overall race leadership.

Stage 4 had many time gaps, as it included two difficult climbs in the final 7 km (4.3 mi). The second-category Côte de Chabrits, at 6.8% grade, crested at that point. Following a quick descent, the final 3 km (1.9 mi) of the stage were spent on the first-category Côte de la Croix Neuve climb in Mende, with a steady 10.7% grade.

Wild card rivals Vacansoleil and Skil–Shimano were again active in the breakaways, placing Marco Marcato and Albert Timmer, respectively, in the day's principal break alongside Jérôme Pineau, Jean-Marc Marino, Julien Loubet, Amaël Moinard, and Mikel Nieve. Their advantage on the peloton hovered between three and four minutes for most of the stage, until Astana took to pacing the main field to start to bring them back. The catch occurred 9 km (5.6 mi) from the finish line.

After other riders tried their luck and were brought back, Alberto Contador put in an attack that no one could answer, netting him the stage win. The field finished scattered behind him, and when overnight race leader Jens Voigt finished 44 seconds back, Contador also became the new race leader.

Stage 4 result

	Cyclist	Team	Time
1	Alberto Contador (ESP)	Astana	4h 26' 47"
2	~~Alejandro Valverde (ESP)~~	~~Caisse d'Epargne~~	+ 10"
3	Samuel Sánchez (ESP)	Euskaltel–Euskadi	+ 10"
4	Joaquim Rodríguez (ESP)	Team Katusha	+ 18"
5	Thomas Voeckler (FRA)	Bbox Bouygues Telecom	+ 20"
6	Damiano Cunego (ITA)	Lampre–Farnese Vini	+ 21"
7	Roman Kreuziger (CZE)	Liquigas–Doimo	+ 21"
8	Christophe Le Mével (FRA)	Française des Jeux	+ 29"
9	Luis León Sánchez (ESP)	Caisse d'Epargne	+ 29"
10	Rein Taaramäe (EST)	Cofidis	+ 31"

General Classification after Stage 4

	Cyclist	Team	Time
1	Alberto Contador (ESP)	Astana	17h 07' 23"
2	Alejandro Valverde (ESP)	Caisse d'Epargne	+ 24"
3	Roman Kreuziger (CZE)	Liquigas–Doimo	+ 25"
4	Luis León Sánchez (ESP)	Caisse d'Epargne	+ 28"
5	Samuel Sánchez (ESP)	Euskaltel–Euskadi	+ 29"
6	Jens Voigt (GER)	Team Saxo Bank	+ 34"
7	Joaquim Rodríguez (ESP)	Team Katusha	+ 36"
8	Peter Sagan (SVK)	Liquigas–Doimo	+ 54"
9	David Millar (GBR)	Garmin–Transitions	+ 1' 03"
10	Rein Taaramäe (EST)	Cofidis	+ 1' 06"

=== Stage 5 ===
12 March 2010 — Pernes-les-Fontaines to Aix-en-Provence, 157 km (97.6 mi)

The fifth stage was again undulating. There were four categorized climbs on course, with the last occurring 30 km (19 mi) from the finish line, and an uncategorized "wall" just before the stage ended.

In heavy contrast to the previous days of racing, stage five began with sunshine and warm temperatures. Sylvain Chavanel instigated the day's first breakaway, but Astana drilled the peloton at 45 km/h (28 mph) in the stage's second hour, meaning Chavanel's group was not away for very long. At around 50 km (31 mi) to go, Carlos Barredo, Volodymir Gustov, Sylvain Calzati, and Rein Taaramäe tried their luck. This group's maximum advantage was 1' 20", meaning Taaramäe was briefly race leader on the road, as he started the stage 1' 06" down to Alberto Contador. Taaramäe took maximum mountains points on the last two climbs, protecting teammate Amaël Moinard's newly-taken lead in the mountains classification. With 25 km (16 mi) remaining, after the catch occurred, Ag2r–La Mondiale set a blistering pace at the front of the main field, trying to set up Nicolas Roche for a sprint win. The pace fractured the peloton, with Levi Leipheimer and Thomas Voeckler notables among a large group that lost 2' 36" at the finish line.

With 3 km (1.9 mi) left to go, Peter Sagan put in an "audacious" attack that won the young Slovak his second stage in three days. Top general classification contenders like Alejandro Valverde and Contador finished together 2 seconds behind Sagan, as they were unable to overtake Sagan on the road. Contador referred to the day as "a terrible stage", as no team seemed able to take control of the chaotic day of racing.

Stage 5 result

	Cyclist	Team	Time
1	Peter Sagan (SVK)	Liquigas–Doimo	3h 34' 15"
2	Mirco Lorenzetto (ITA)	Lampre–Farnese Vini	+ 2"
3	~~Alejandro Valverde (ESP)~~	~~Caisse d'Epargne~~	+ 2"
4	Matthieu Ladagnous (FRA)	Française des Jeux	+ 2"
5	Jens Voigt (GER)	Team Saxo Bank	+ 2"
6	Simon Gerrans (AUS)	Team Sky	+ 2"
7	Koldo Fernández (ESP)	Euskaltel–Euskadi	+ 2"
8	Nicolas Roche (IRE)	Ag2r–La Mondiale	+ 2"
9	Matthew Goss (AUS)	Team HTC–Columbia	+ 2"
10	Alberto Contador (ESP)	Astana	+ 2"

General Classification after Stage 5

	Cyclist	Team	Time
1	Alberto Contador (ESP)	Astana	20h 41' 40"
2	Alejandro Valverde (ESP)	Caisse d'Epargne	+ 20"
3	Roman Kreuziger (CZE)	Liquigas–Doimo	+ 25"
4	Luis León Sánchez (ESP)	Caisse d'Epargne	+ 26"
5	Samuel Sánchez (ESP)	Euskaltel–Euskadi	+ 29"
6	Jens Voigt (GER)	Team Saxo Bank	+ 34"
7	Joaquim Rodríguez (ESP)	Team Katusha	+ 36"
8	Peter Sagan (SVK)	Liquigas–Doimo	+ 42"
9	David Millar (GBR)	Garmin–Transitions	+ 1' 02"
10	Rein Taaramäe (EST)	Cofidis	+ 1' 06"

=== Stage 6 ===
13 March 2010 — Peynier to Tourrettes-sur-Loup, 220 km (140 mi)

Stage six was the queen stage, with eight categorized climbs on the road. The last was the first-category Col de Vence, which had a 6.6% grade, steady for the 9.7 km (6.0 mi) the climb took. A steep descent and a small raise to the finish line followed.

Some big-name riders made the escape on this stage. A group of 23 formed early on, including Levi Leipheimer, Damiano Cunego, and Sylvain Chavanel. Mountains classification leader Amaël Moinard was also in the break, and took top points on five of the stage's climbs to give himself an unassailable lead in those standings. When the advantage of this group reached two minutes, the overall race lead of Alberto Contador was threatened by Chavanel. However, Contador's Astana team got help in pacing the main field from two teams who missed the break, namely Caisse d'Epargne and Garmin–Transitions. On the ascent of the Col de Vence, the only riders remaining from the break were Xavier Tondó, Alexandr Kolobnev, Cyril Gautier, Chavanel, and Cunego. Various attacks and splits out of the peloton eventually absorbed all but Tondó, who soloed to the finish line with a 5-second advantage over the main field, led home by Alejandro Valverde. Only time bonuses won by Valverde and Peter Sagan caused the overall standings to change.

Stage 6 result

	Cyclist	Team	Time
1	Xavier Tondó (ESP)	Cervélo TestTeam	5h 01' 39"
2	~~Alejandro Valverde (ESP)~~	~~Caisse d'Epargne~~	+ 5"
3	Peter Sagan (SVK)	Liquigas–Doimo	+ 5"
4	Samuel Sánchez (ESP)	Euskaltel–Euskadi	+ 5"
5	Joaquim Rodríguez (ESP)	Team Katusha	+ 5"
6	Leonardo Duque (COL)	Cofidis	+ 5"
7	Luis León Sánchez (ESP)	Caisse d'Epargne	+ 5"
8	Christophe Riblon (FRA)	Ag2r–La Mondiale	+ 5"
9	Rein Taaramäe (EST)	Cofidis	+ 5"
10	Daniele Righi (ITA)	Lampre–Farnese Vini	+ 5"

General Classification after Stage 6

	Cyclist	Team	Time
1	Alberto Contador (ESP)	Astana	25h 43' 24"
2	Alejandro Valverde (ESP)	Caisse d'Epargne	+ 14"
3	Roman Kreuziger (CZE)	Liquigas–Doimo	+ 25"
4	Luis León Sánchez (ESP)	Caisse d'Epargne	+ 26"
5	Samuel Sánchez (ESP)	Euskaltel–Euskadi	+ 29"
6	Jens Voigt (GER)	Team Saxo Bank	+ 34"
7	Joaquim Rodríguez (ESP)	Team Katusha	+ 36"
8	Peter Sagan (SVK)	Liquigas–Doimo	+ 38"
9	David Millar (GBR)	Garmin–Transitions	+ 1' 02"
10	Rein Taaramäe (EST)	Cofidis	+ 1' 06"

=== Stage 7 ===
14 March 2010 — Nice, 119 km (74 mi)

The final stage was short, but it was far from ceremonial, containing three first-category climbs. It started and ended, after a loop, in Nice. The Col de la Porte was probably the most difficult climb in the race, reaching 1,068 m (3,504 ft) in elevation on a 7.2% grade. After that peak, the riders descended almost to sea level again before scaling La Turbie, which was less steep but a longer climb. The Col d'Eze was the final climb of the Race to the Sun, after which the peloton descended all the way to sea level before finishing the race.

The peloton stayed together through the first hour of this stage. When Peter Sagan won the first intermediate sprint, at the 18.5 km (11.5 mi) mark, he secured his victory in the points classification over Jens Voigt and Alejandro Valverde. On the ascent of the Col de la Porte, Thomas Voeckler and mountains classification leader Amaël Moinard slipped away and built up a two-minute gap. The chase began in earnest early on such a short stage, but because of the mountainous parcours the two still had a lead of 30 seconds on the descent of the Col d'Eze. Moinard took 28 of 30 possible mountains classification points on the day despite already having an unassailable lead in the classification. In defense of his yellow jersey, Alberto Contador went on the attack to try to reel in Moinard and Voeckler on the ascent of the Col d'Eze, taking with him Luis León Sánchez, Valvede, Rein Taaramäe, and Joaquim Rodríguez. Rodríguez was the aggressor from this group on the climb, gapping them for a time, though he was unable to bridge to the leaders. Samuel Sánchez and Tiago Machado bridged from the peloton to the Contador group, and Machado and Valverde also gapped them, putting in a clear threat to Contador. Contador himself was forced to tap out a pace that brought them back.

While Moinard and Voeckler were in view of the Contador group in the final kilometer, they were able to stay away to the finish line. Voeckler thought the group was closer to them than they actually were, and started his sprint for the finish line very early. Moinard easily held his wheel until the final few meters, and came around him for the victory. Valverde claimed bonus seconds for third on the stage, but it was not enough to force Contador from the top step of the final podium.

Stage 7 result

	Cyclist	Team	Time
1	Amaël Moinard (FRA)	Cofidis	2h 52' 09"
2	Thomas Voeckler (FRA)	Bbox Bouygues Telecom	s.t.
3	~~Alejandro Valverde (ESP)~~	~~Caisse d'Epargne~~	+ 3"
4	Nicolas Roche (IRL)	Ag2r–La Mondiale	+ 3"
5	Rein Taaramäe (EST)	Cofidis	+ 3"
6	Joaquim Rodríguez (ESP)	Team Katusha	+ 3"
7	Jens Voigt (GER)	Team Saxo Bank	+ 3"
8	Chris Horner (USA)	Team RadioShack	+ 3"
9	Janez Brajkovič (SLO)	Team RadioShack	+ 3"
10	Alberto Contador (ESP)	Astana	+ 3"

Final General Classification

	Cyclist	Team	Time
1	Alberto Contador (ESP)	Astana	28h 35' 35"
2	Alejandro Valverde (ESP)	Caisse d'Epargne	+ 11"
3	Luis León Sánchez (ESP)	Caisse d'Epargne	+ 25"
4	Roman Kreuziger (CZE)	Liquigas–Doimo	+ 26"
5	Samuel Sánchez (ESP)	Euskaltel–Euskadi	+ 30"
6	Jens Voigt (GER)	Team Saxo Bank	+ 35"
7	Joaquim Rodríguez (ESP)	Team Katusha	+ 37"
8	Rein Taaramäe (EST)	Cofidis	+ 1' 07"
9	Jean-Christophe Péraud (FRA)	Omega Pharma–Lotto	+ 1' 16"
10	Jérôme Coppel (FRA)	Saur–Sojasun	+ 1' 17"

== Classification leadership progress ==
Stage	Winner	General Classification	Points Classification	Mountains Classification	Young Rider Classification	Team Classification
P	Lars Boom	Lars Boom	Lars Boom	Lars Boom	Lars Boom	Team RadioShack
1	Greg Henderson	Lars Boom	Lars Boom	Lars Boom	Lars Boom	Caisse d'Epargne
2	William Bonnet	Lars Boom	Luis León Sánchez	Laurent Mangel	Lars Boom	Caisse d'Epargne
3	Peter Sagan	Jens Voigt	Peter Sagan	Laurent Mangel	Peter Sagan	Liquigas–Doimo
4	Alberto Contador	Alberto Contador	Peter Sagan	Laurent Mangel	Roman Kreuziger	Caisse d'Epargne
5	Peter Sagan	Alberto Contador	Peter Sagan	Amaël Moinard	Roman Kreuziger	Caisse d'Epargne
6	Xavier Tondó	Alberto Contador	Peter Sagan	Amaël Moinard	Roman Kreuziger	Liquigas–Doimo
7	Amaël Moinard	Alberto Contador	Peter Sagan	Amaël Moinard	Roman Kreuziger	Ag2r–La Mondiale
Final		Alberto Contador	Peter Sagan	Amaël Moinard	Roman Kreuziger	Ag2r–La Mondiale

== Final standings ==
=== Final General Classification ===
All riders from second place downward promoted by one position due to the retroactive suspension of Alejandro Valverde

	Cyclist	Team	Time
1	Alberto Contador (ESP)	Astana	28h 35' 35"
2	Luis León Sánchez (ESP)	Caisse d'Epargne	+ 25"
3	Roman Kreuziger (CZE)	Liquigas–Doimo	+ 26"
4	Samuel Sánchez (ESP)	Euskaltel–Euskadi	+ 30"
5	Jens Voigt (GER)	Team Saxo Bank	+ 35"
6	Joaquim Rodríguez (ESP)	Team Katusha	+ 37"
7	Rein Taaramäe (EST)	Cofidis	+ 1' 07"
8	Jean-Christophe Péraud (FRA)	Omega Pharma–Lotto	+ 1' 16"
9	Jérôme Coppel (FRA)	Saur–Sojasun	+ 1' 17"
10	Nicolas Roche (IRE)	Ag2r–La Mondiale	+ 1' 23"

=== Points Classification ===
Points earned by Alejandro Valverde are subject to removal, and so ranking is subject to revision.

	Cyclist	Team	Points
1	Peter Sagan (SVK)	Liquigas–Doimo	112
2	~~Alejandro Valverde (ESP)~~	~~Caisse d'Epargne~~	~~105~~
3	Jens Voigt (GER)	Team Saxo Bank	104
4	Alberto Contador (ESP)	Astana	89
5	Joaquim Rodríguez (ESP)	Team Katusha	82
6	Luis León Sánchez (ESP)	Caisse d'Epargne	80
7	Nicolas Roche (IRE)	Ag2r–La Mondiale	78
8	Samuel Sánchez (ESP)	Euskaltel–Euskadi	60
9	Mirco Lorenzetto (ITA)	Lampre–Farnese Vini	58
10	Thomas Voeckler (FRA)	Bbox Bouygues Telecom	52

=== Mountains Classification ===
Points earned by Alejandro Valverde are subject to removal, and so ranking is subject to revision.

	Cyclist	Team	Points
1	Amaël Moinard (FRA)	Cofidis	75
2	Thomas Voeckler (FRA)	Bbox Bouygues Telecom	29
3	Alberto Contador (ESP)	Astana	24
4	~~Alejandro Valverde (ESP)~~	~~Caisse d'Epargne~~	~~18~~
5	Damiano Cunego (ITA)	Lampre–Farnese Vini	17
6	Xavier Tondo (ESP)	Cervélo TestTeam	16
7	Rein Taaramäe (EST)	Cofidis	13
8	Cyril Gautier (FRA)	Bbox Bouygues Telecom	12
9	Jean Marc Marino (FRA)	Saur-Sojasun	11
10	Joaquim Rodríguez (ESP)	Team Katusha	11
