= Amaël Moinard =

French road bicycle racer

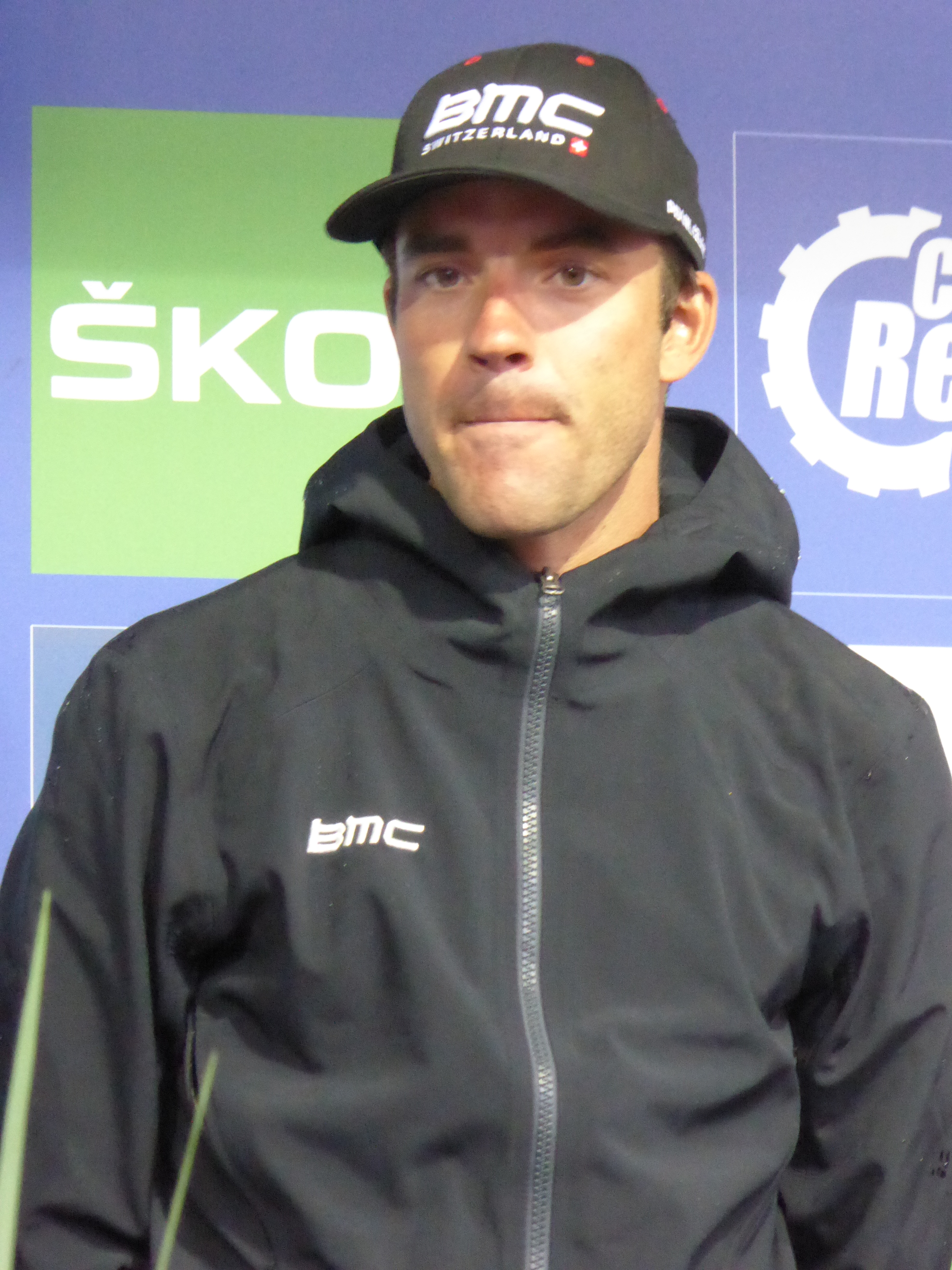
- Moinard at the 2016 Tour of Britain

Personal information
- Full name: Amaël Moinard
- Born: 2 February 1982 (age 44) Cherbourg, France
- Height: 1.80 m (5 ft 11 in)
- Weight: 69 kg (152 lb; 10 st 12 lb)

Cycling career
- Sport: Cycling
- Discipline: Road
- Role: Rider
- Rider type: Domestique

Amateur teams
- 1997–2000: UST Equeurdreville
- 2001–2002: VC Saint-Lo
- 2003: VC Rouen 76
- 2004: Jean Floc'h-Moréac
- 2004: Cofidis (stagiaire)

Professional teams
- 2005–2010: Cofidis
- 2011–2017: BMC Racing Team
- 2018–2019: Fortuneo–Samsic

Amaël Moinard (born 2 February 1982 in Cherbourg) is a French former professional road bicycle racer, who competed professionally between 2005 and 2019 for the Cofidis, BMC Racing Team and Arkéa–Samsic teams. In his first year with the BMC Racing Team in 2011, Moinard rode the Tour de France as a teammate for Cadel Evans who won the race.

Moinard announced at the end of Tour de France that he would retire at the end of the 2019 season.

== Major results ==
2006
6th Châteauroux Classic de l'Indre
8th Overall Tour de l'Avenir
8th Overall Tour du Poitou-Charentes
2007
10th Overall Route du Sud

1st Stage 3

2008
9th Overall Tour Méditerranéen
10th Grand Prix de Plumelec-Morbihan
Combativity award Stage 11 Tour de France
2010
Paris–Nice

1st Mountains classification
1st Stage 7

7th Overall La Tropicale Amissa Bongo
7th Duo Normand (with Julien Fouchard)
2014
3rd Overall Tour du Haut Var

1st Stage 2

9th Overall Arctic Race of Norway
2015
1st Stage 1 (TTT) Vuelta a España
7th Volta Limburg Classic
2016
6th Classic Sud-Ardèche
10th Overall Arctic Race of Norway

=== Grand Tour general classification results timeline ===
Grand Tour	2006	2007	2008	2009	2010	2011	2012	2013	2014	2015	2016	2017	2018	2019
Giro d'Italia	112	46	—	—	—	—	—	—	—	15	—	—	—	—
Tour de France	—	—	15	65	70	65	45	56	45	—	45	32	48	92
Vuelta a España	—	—	—	18	—	—	99	—	—	59	—	—	—	—

Legend
—	Did not compete
DNF	Did not finish
