= Feings, Loir-et-Cher =

Former commune in France

Feings
- Part of Le Controis-en-Sologne
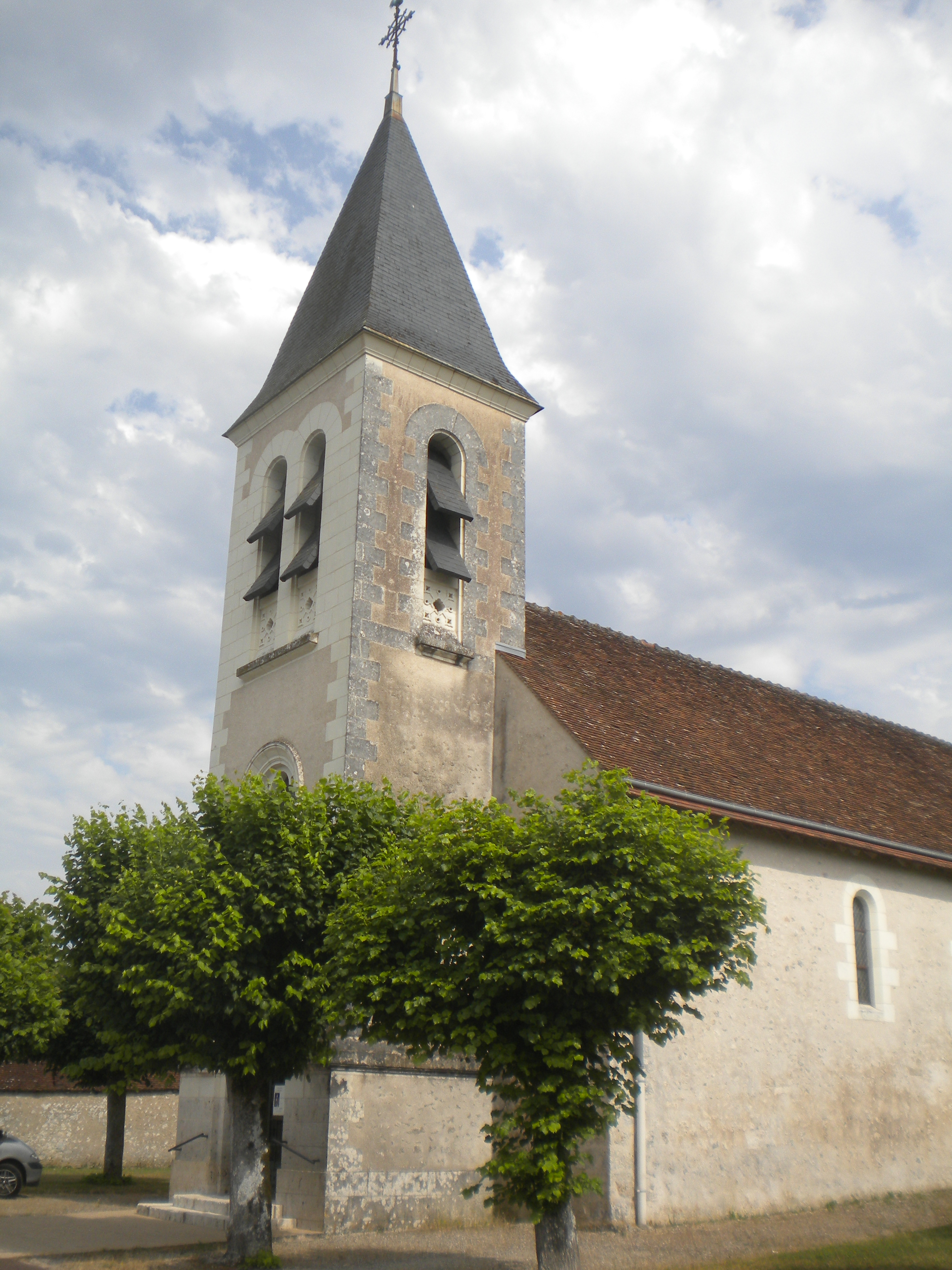
- Location of Feings
- Location within France Location within Centre-Val de Loire
- Coordinates: 47°26′19″N 1°21′13″E
- Country: France
- Region: Centre-Val de Loire
- Department: Loir-et-Cher
- Arrondissement: Romorantin-Lanthenay
- Canton: Blois-3
- Commune: Le Controis-en-Sologne
- Area^{1}: 16.52 km^{2} (6.38 sq mi)
- Elevation: 100 m (330 ft)
- Highest elevation: 116 m (381 ft)
- Lowest elevation: 84 m (276 ft)
- Population (2023): 725
  - Density: 43.9/km^{2} (114/sq mi)
- Time zone: UTC+01:00 (CET)
  - Summer (DST): UTC+02:00 (CEST)
- Postal code: 41120
- ^{1} French Land Register data, which excludes lakes, ponds, glaciers > 1 km^{2} (0.386 sq mi or 247 acres) and river estuaries.

Feings (French pronunciation: [fɛ̃]) is a former commune in the Loir-et-Cher department of central France. On 1 January 2019, it was merged into the new commune Le Controis-en-Sologne.

== See also ==
- Communes of the Loir-et-Cher department
