= Contres, Loir-et-Cher =

Contres
- Part of Le Controis-en-Sologne
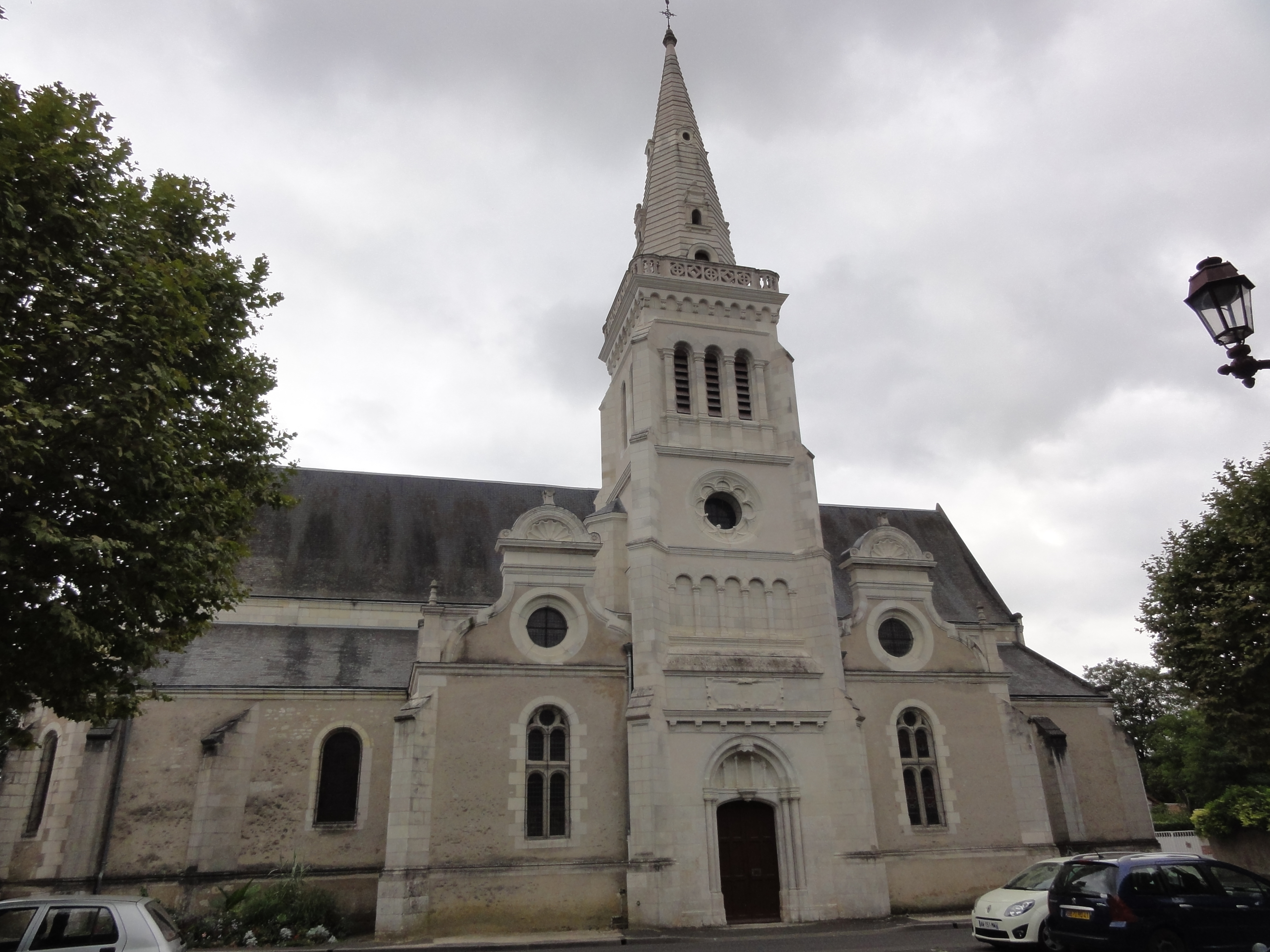
- Church of Saint-Cyr and Sainte-Julitte

- Coat of arms
- Location of Contres
- Location within France Location within Centre-Val de Loire
- Coordinates: 47°25′11″N 1°25′43″E
- Country: France
- Region: Centre-Val de Loire
- Department: Loir-et-Cher
- Arrondissement: Romorantin-Lanthenay
- Canton: Montrichard Val de Cher
- Commune: Le Controis-en-Sologne
- Area^{1}: 36.09 km^{2} (13.93 sq mi)
- Elevation: 100 m (330 ft)
- Highest elevation: 129 m (423 ft)
- Lowest elevation: 94 m (308 ft)
- Population (2022): 3,632
  - Density: 100.6/km^{2} (260.6/sq mi)
- Demonym: Controis·e
- Time zone: UTC+01:00 (CET)
  - Summer (DST): UTC+02:00 (CEST)
- Postal code: 41700
- ^{1} French Land Register data, which excludes lakes, ponds, glaciers > 1 km^{2} (0.386 sq mi or 247 acres) and river estuaries.

Contres (French pronunciation: [kɔ̃tʁ]) is a former commune in the Loir-et-Cher department in the administrative region of Centre-Val de Loire, France. On 1 January 2019, it was merged into the new commune Le Controis-en-Sologne.

== Population ==
Historical population

Year	Pop.	±% p.a.
1793	1,317	—
1800	1,229	−0.98%
1806	1,202	−0.37%
1821	1,571	+1.80%
1831	1,755	+1.11%
1836	2,004	+2.69%
1841	2,166	+1.57%
1846	2,503	+2.93%
1851	2,575	+0.57%
1856	2,550	−0.19%
1861	2,601	+0.40%
1866	2,611	+0.08%
1872	2,553	−0.37%
1876	2,617	+0.62%
1881	2,493	−0.97%
1886	2,576	+0.66%
1891	2,591	+0.12%
1896	2,586	−0.04%

Year	Pop.	±% p.a.
1901	2,649	+0.48%
1906	2,582	−0.51%
1911	2,543	−0.30%
1921	2,421	−0.49%
1926	2,400	−0.17%
1931	2,452	+0.43%
1936	2,576	+0.99%
1946	2,702	+0.48%
1954	2,551	−0.72%
1962	2,775	+1.06%
1968	2,828	+0.32%
1975	2,811	−0.09%
1982	2,923	+0.56%
1990	2,979	+0.24%
1999	3,268	+1.03%
2006	3,417	+0.64%
2022	3,632	+0.38%

Source: EHESS and INSEE

== See also ==
- Communes of the Loir-et-Cher department
