= List of châteaux in Loir-et-Cher =

This article is a non-exhaustive list of the château, located in the French department of Loir-et-Cher in the Centre-Val de Loire region.

== List of châteaux ==
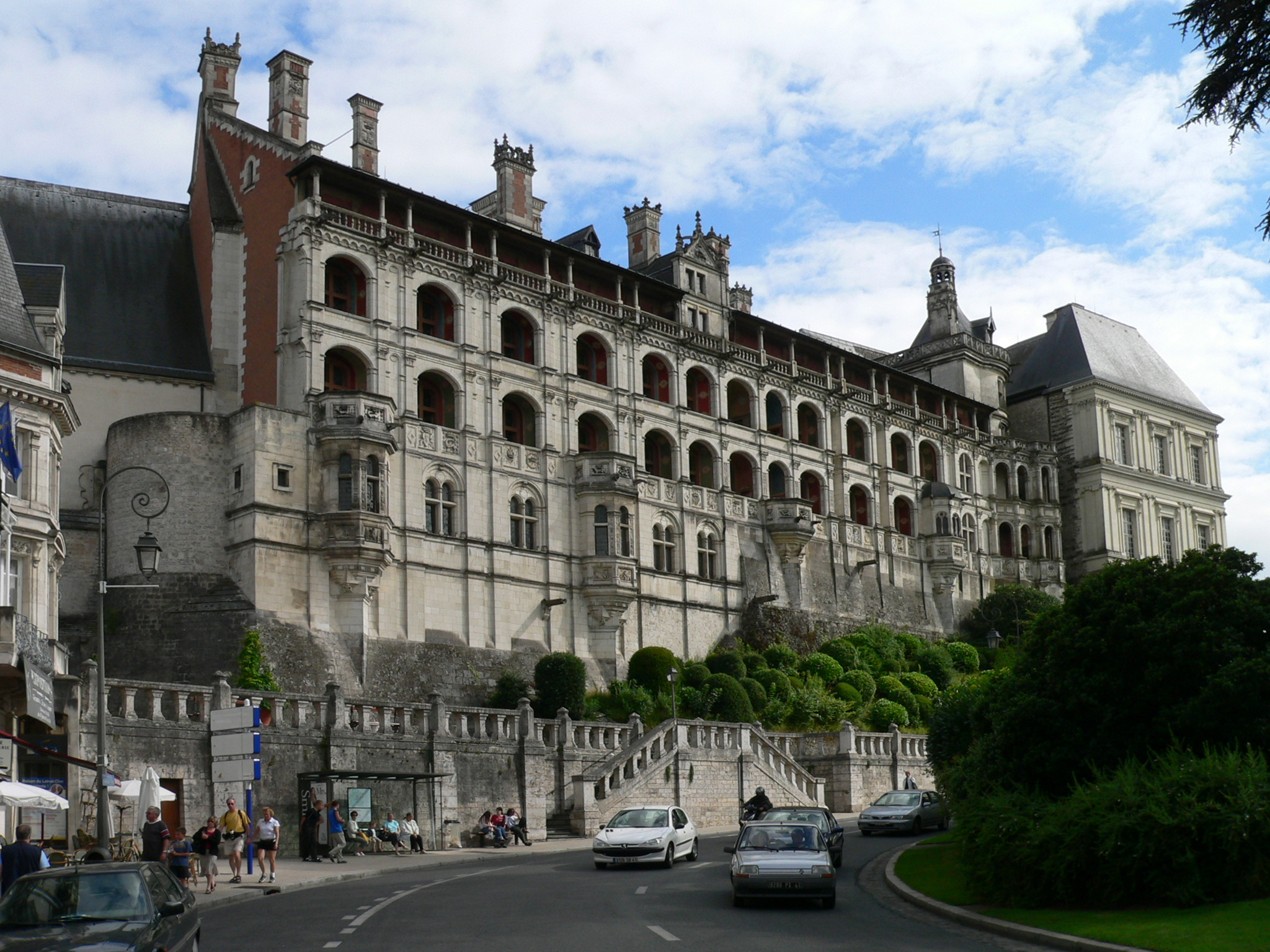
Château de Blois

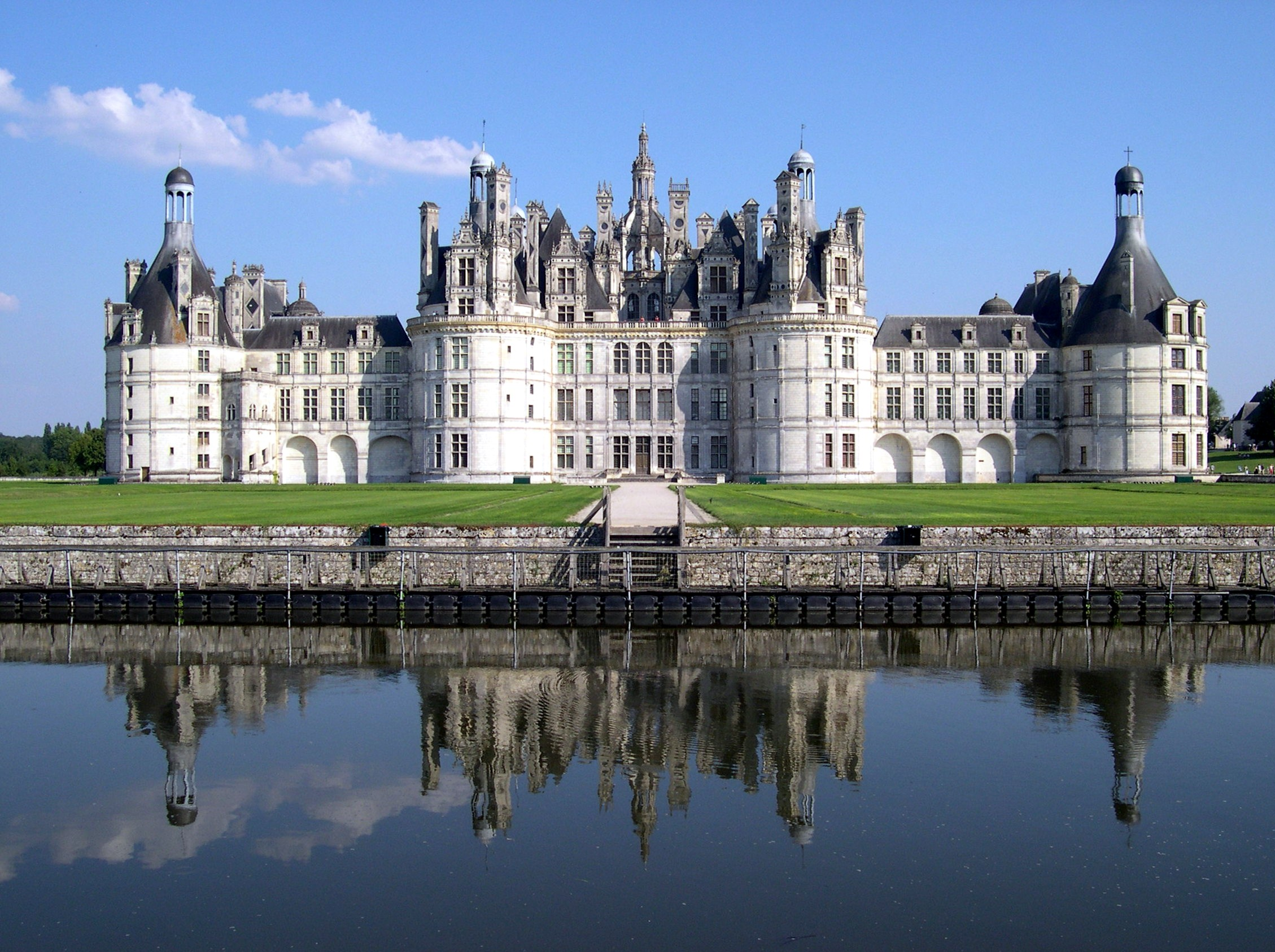
Château de Chambord

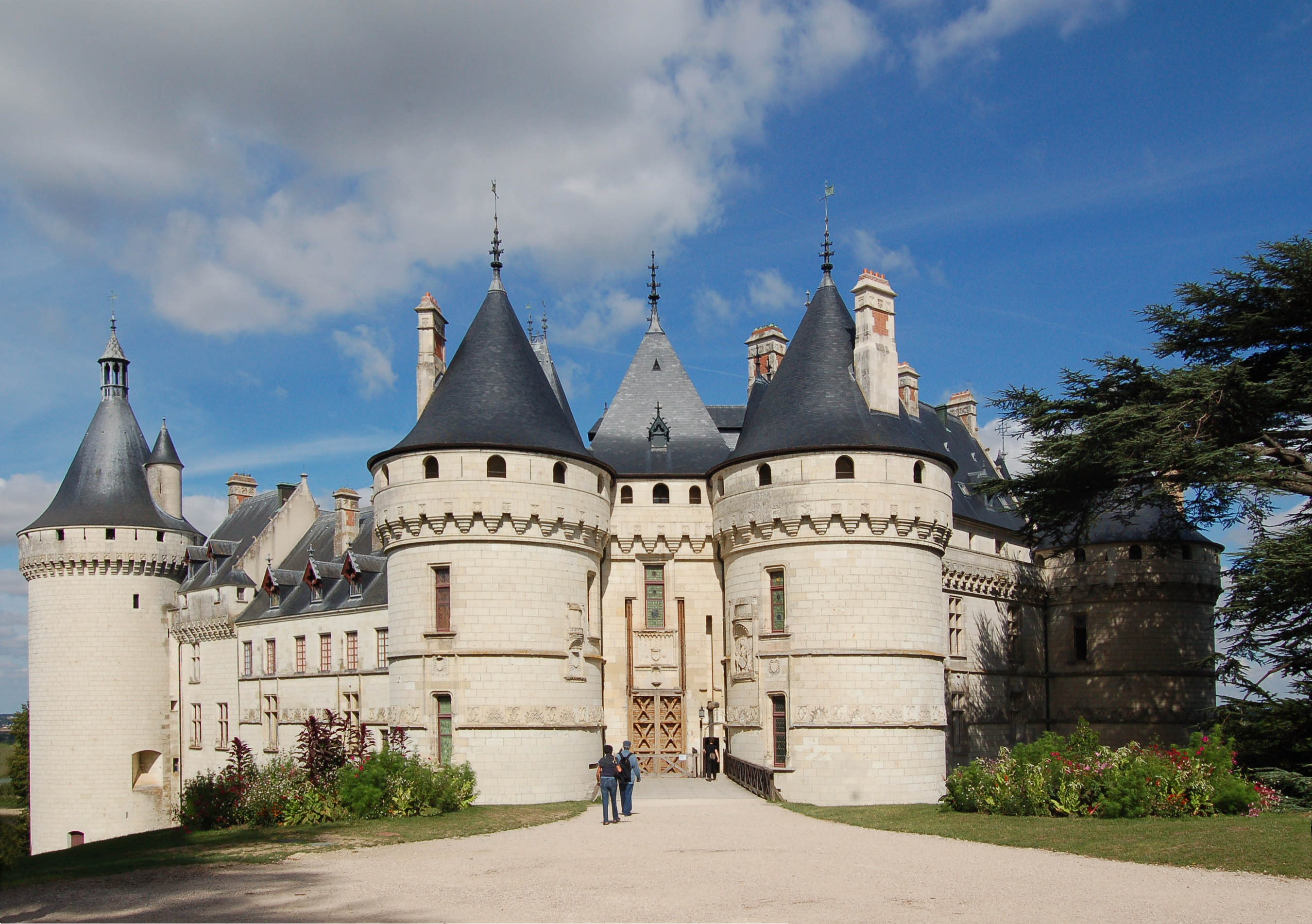
Château de Chaumont-sur-Loire

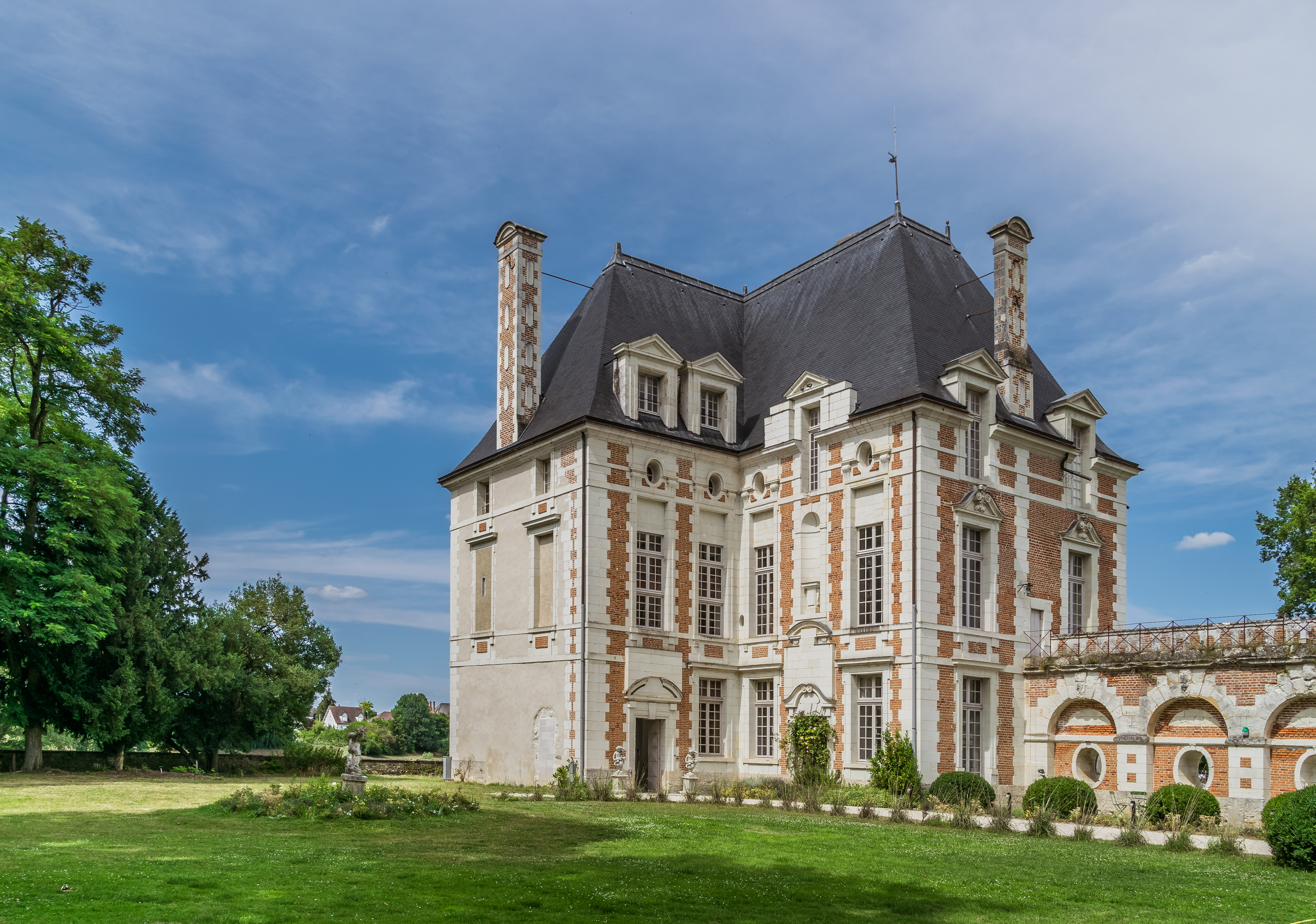
Château de Selles-sur-Cher

- Château de Beauregard in Cellettes
- Château de Blois in Blois
- Château du Breuil in Cheverny
- Château de Chambord in Chambord
- Château de Chaslay in Montoire-sur-le-Loir
- Château de Chaumont-sur-Loire in Chaumont-sur-Loire
- Château de Cheverny in Cheverny
- Château de Chémery in Chémery
- Château de Chissay in Chissay-en-Touraine
- Château de Droué in Droué
- Château de Fougères-sur-Bièvre in Fougères-sur-Bièvre
- Château du Fresne in Authon
- Château de Fréteval in Fréteval
- Château des Grotteaux in Huisseau-sur-Cosson
- Château du Gué-Péan in Monthou-sur-Cher
- Château d'Herbilly in Mer
- Château de la Ferté in La Ferté-Imbault
- Châteazu de Launoy in Souvigny-en-Sologne
- Château de Lavardin in Lavardin
- Château de Matval in Bonneveau
- Château de Menars in Menars
- Château de Montoire in Montoire-sur-le-Loir
- Château de Montrichard in Montrichard
- Château du Moulin in Lassay-sur-Croisne
- Château du Plessis-Fortia in Huisseau-en-Beauce
- Château de la Possonnière in Couture-sur-Loir, (dit château de Ronsard)
- Château de Saint-Denis-sur-Loire in Saint-Denis-sur-Loire
- Château de Selles-sur-Cher in Selles-sur-Cher
- Château de Talcy in Talcy
- Château de Troussay in Cheverny
- Château de Vendôme in Vendôme
- Château de Villebourgeon in Neung-sur-Beuvron
- Château de Villesavin in Tour-en-Sologne
- Château d'ortie in Salbris
- Château de Rivaulde in Salbris

== See also ==
- List of châteaux in Centre-Val de Loire
- List of châteaux in France
- List of castles in France
