= Selles =

Selles may refer to:

== Communes in France ==
- Selles, Eure, in the Eure département
- Selles, Marne, in the Marne département
- Selles, Pas-de-Calais, in the Pas-de-Calais département
- Selles, Haute-Saône, in the Haute-Saône département
- Selles-Saint-Denis, in the Loir-et-Cher département
- Selles-sur-Cher, Loir-et-Cher, in the Loir-et-Cher département
- Selles-sur-Nahon, in the Indre département

== Other ==
- Selles-sur-Cher cheese, a French goats' milk cheese

== See also ==
- Seles (disambiguation)
- Selle (disambiguation)
