= Seles =

Seles may refer to:

- Seles, Angola, a municipality
- Battle of Seleš, a 1527 battle between ethnic Serbian Rebels and the Hungarian nobility

== People with the surname ==
- Laslo Seleš (born 1943), retired Yugoslavian football player
- Monica Seles (born 1973), Yugoslav-American professional tennis player

== See also ==
- Sele (disambiguation)
- Selles (disambiguation)
