= Château de Troussay =

Châteaux in Loir-et-Cher, France

Coordinates: 47°29′29″N 1°25′28″E

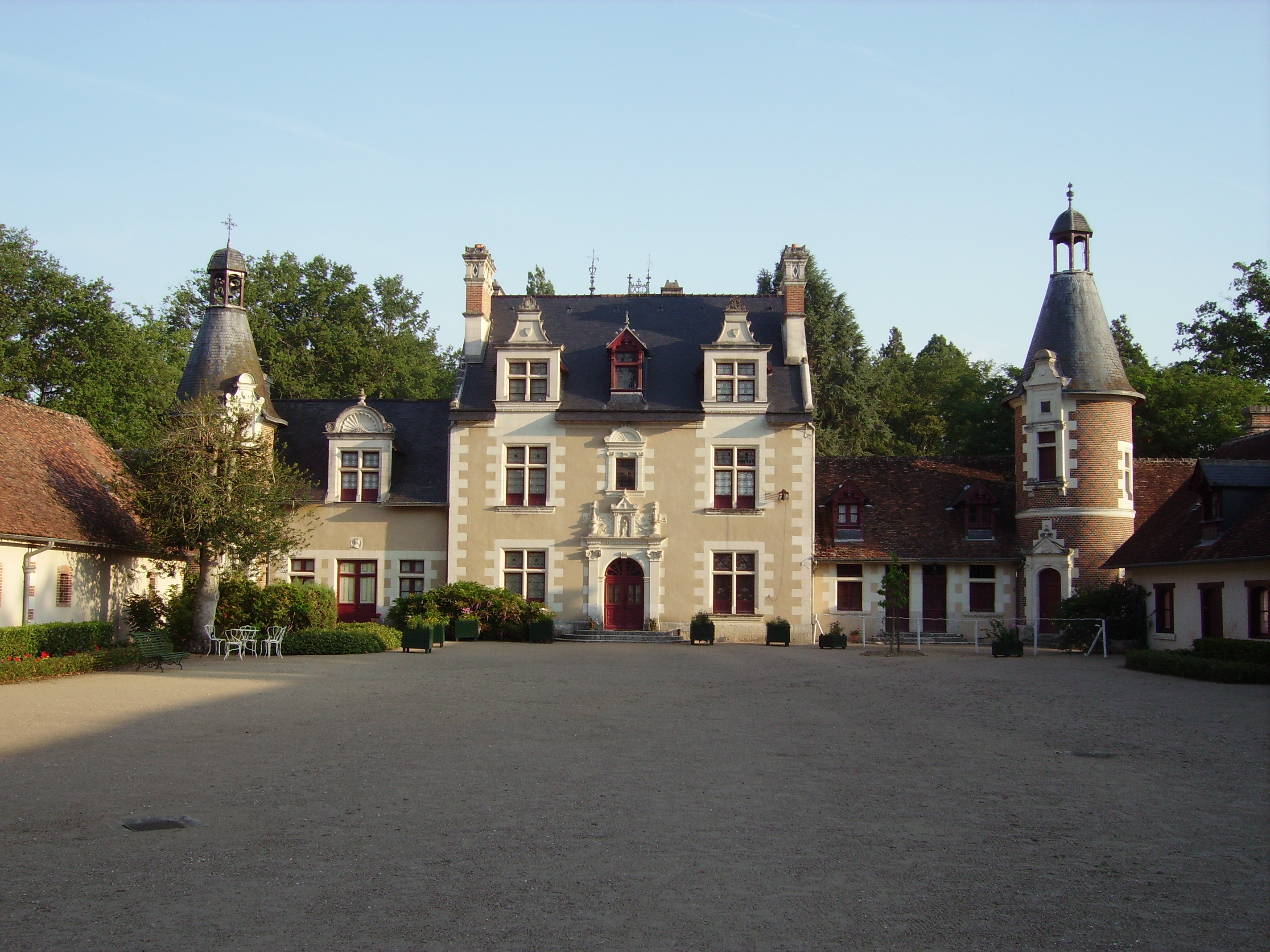
The principal façade of the château, the side named after François I

The Château de Troussay is one of the smallest Châteaux of the Loire Valley, France, and is situated in Cheverny, in the Loir-et-Cher.

Originally a small manor house it belonged to Louis de la Saussaye in the 19th C. Louis was a noted for his work in the preservation of old buildings. His 'restoration'of Troussay allowed him to integrate many styles and objects into the building, giving it a very eclectic style. It is akin to a 6-year-old whose raided her mother's wardrobe.

== History ==
The first building is recorded around 1450, although the oldest existing parts of the structure date from the Renaissance. This is when Robert de Bugy, director of the salt storehouses of the region of Blois and squire of King Francis I of France was the recorded owner. There are no records of a Lord of Troussay.

In the 17th century, the building was enlarged with a central body and two wings. A magnificent formal French-style garden was laid out behind. In 1732, for the first time, the building changed owners: the last Demoiselle de Bugy sold the château to the Pelluys family. In 1741 Gabrielle Pulluys married Christophe de Réméon and the château was her dowry. Their son, Claude was a companion to Henri IV.

The family retained the château after the revolution, with no recorded damage. The owner was then another Christophe de Réméon who married Marie de la Saussaye. They had no children and so the couple adopted the son of François de Paule de la Saussaye and his wife Anne Louise on his father's death in 1815. Louis inherited after the death of his uncle in 1828.

Louis de la Saussaye was a historian of the Loire châteaux, member of the Institut de France and rector of the Académies of Lyon and Poitiers. He recognised the problems of protecting the Loire inheritance especially after the destruction of many châteaux in the Revolution. A friend of Prosper Mérimée and Félix Duban, he restored the château with the architect Louis de la Morandière and incorporated decoration from other destroyed châteaux, according to his own motto "fort à l'abandon". After his death in 1878 the château passed down to his children.

In 1900 the château was sold to Maurice Delamarre de Monchaux, son of Casimir Delamarre de Mouchaux, Count of Monchaux. Maurice had married Isore Hurault de Vibrate in 1896. She grew up in Cheverny and wanted to remain close to her family at the Château de Cheverny. Maurice died in 1952 and his daughter Elisabeth inherited the château. Married to Jacques Marcotte de Sainte-Marie in about 1940, her descendants still own the property. Limited areas and the grounds are open to the public.

== Description ==
=== Façade of François I ===
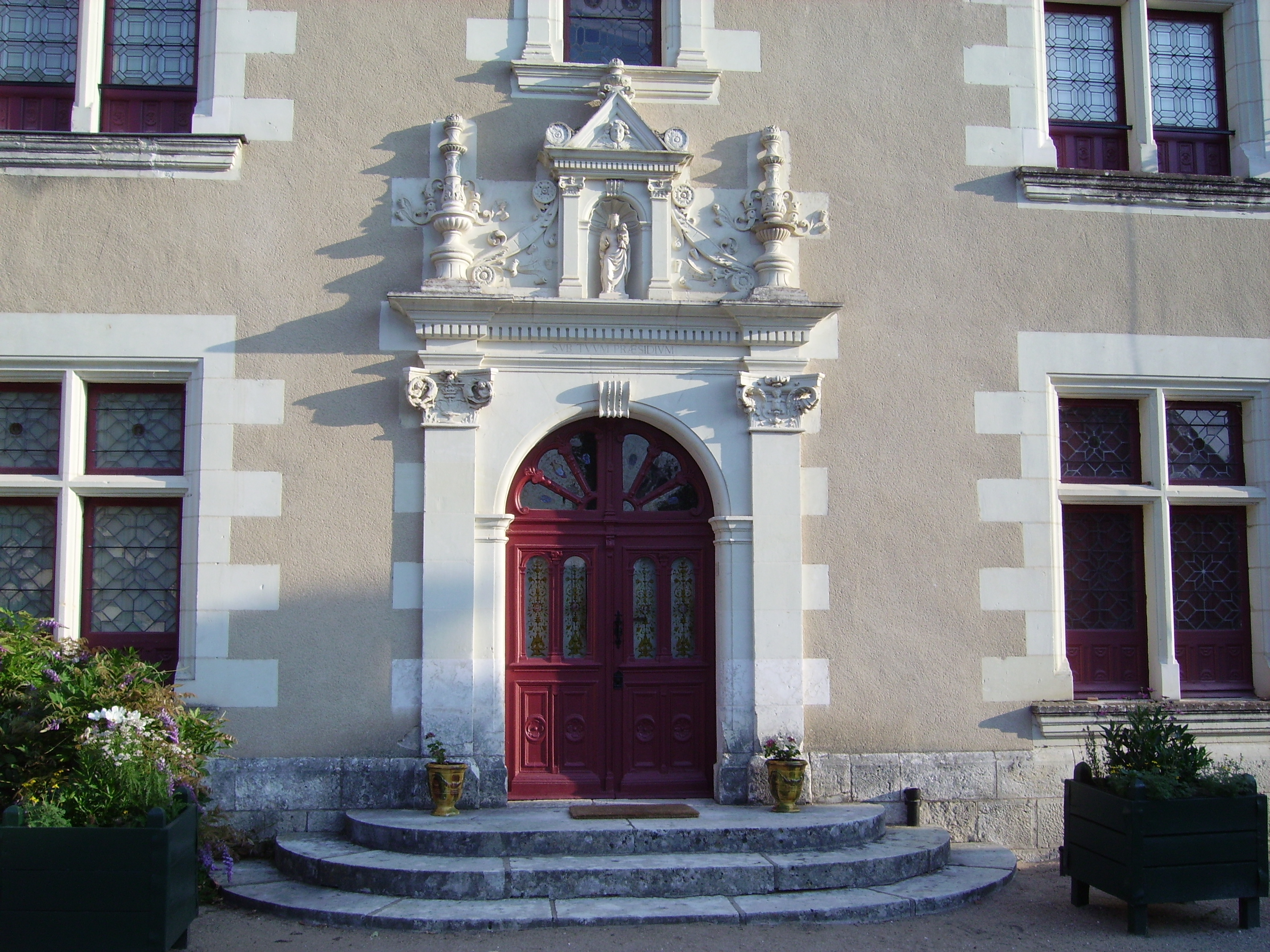
Door of the François I façade

The "François I" façade is heavily influenced by the Château de Chambord. This formal entrance to the main house has insets of slate in the chimneys and stone mullion windows. The towers, built in the 18th century, have pinnacles, as at Chambord.

The right-hand wing (viewed from the formal entrance) houses the domestic offices: the bake house, hay loft and stables. The left-hand wing built by Louis de Saussaye in the 19th C. houses the grand salon. Which is the reason for the asymmetry.

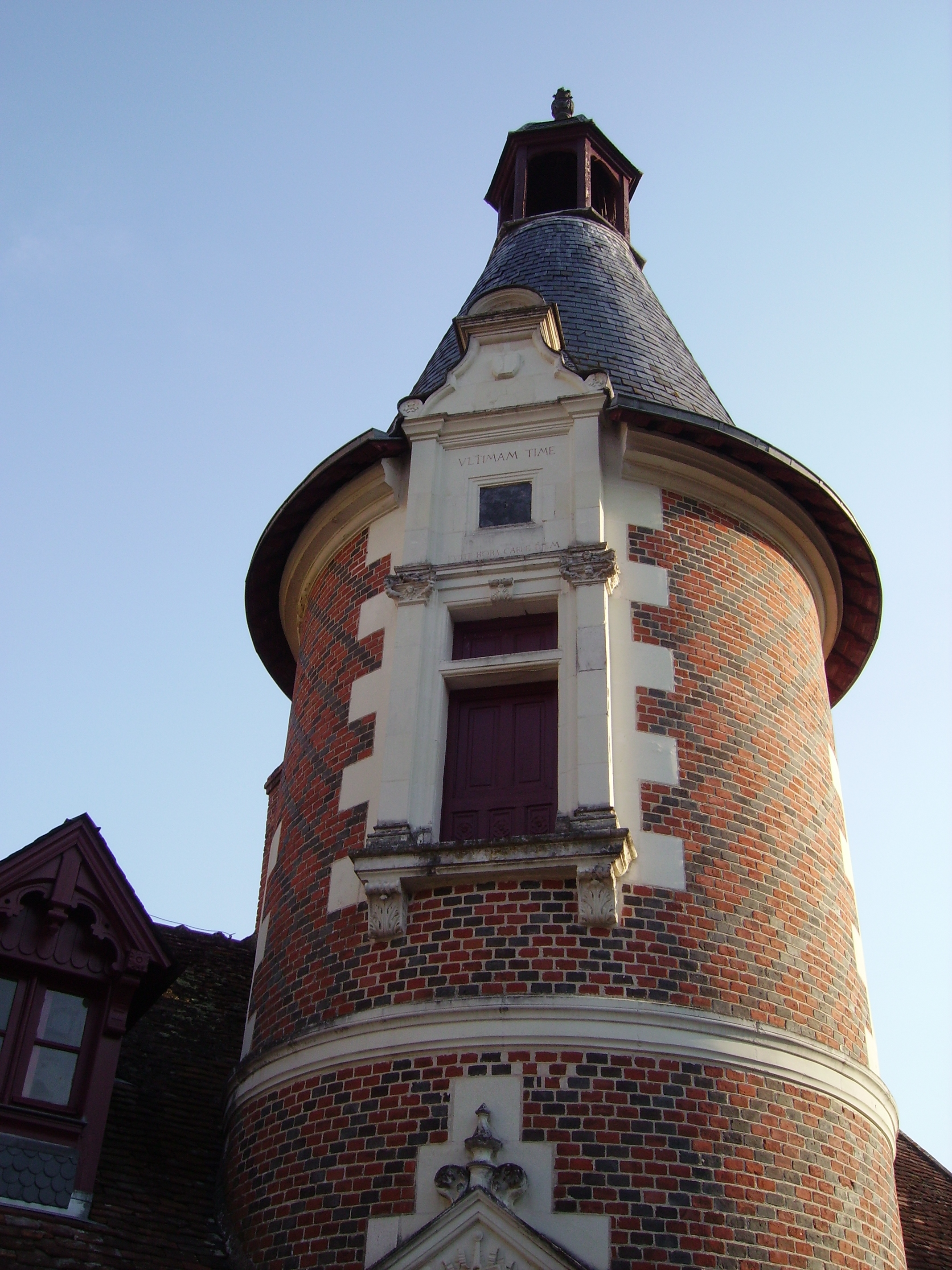
Right tower and sundial

Several sculptures decorate the façade. The main entrance is flanked by two capitals, one Renaissance from the Château de Bury and saved by Louis de la Saussaye; the other was made in the 19th century by the sculptor Lafargue. Over the entrance the small stone, Virgin is a replica of the 15th C. wooden Virgin at the Château de Cheverny. A small relief of a woman from the Italian Renaissance was mounted on the left wing at the time of the restoration.

On the right-hand tower is a sundial, surrounded by an inscription in Latin: Ultimam time, fuit hora, carpe diem: "fear the last hour, time flees, seize the day". Opposite this, on the left-hand tower is a clock with only an hour hand.

=== Façade of Louis XII ===
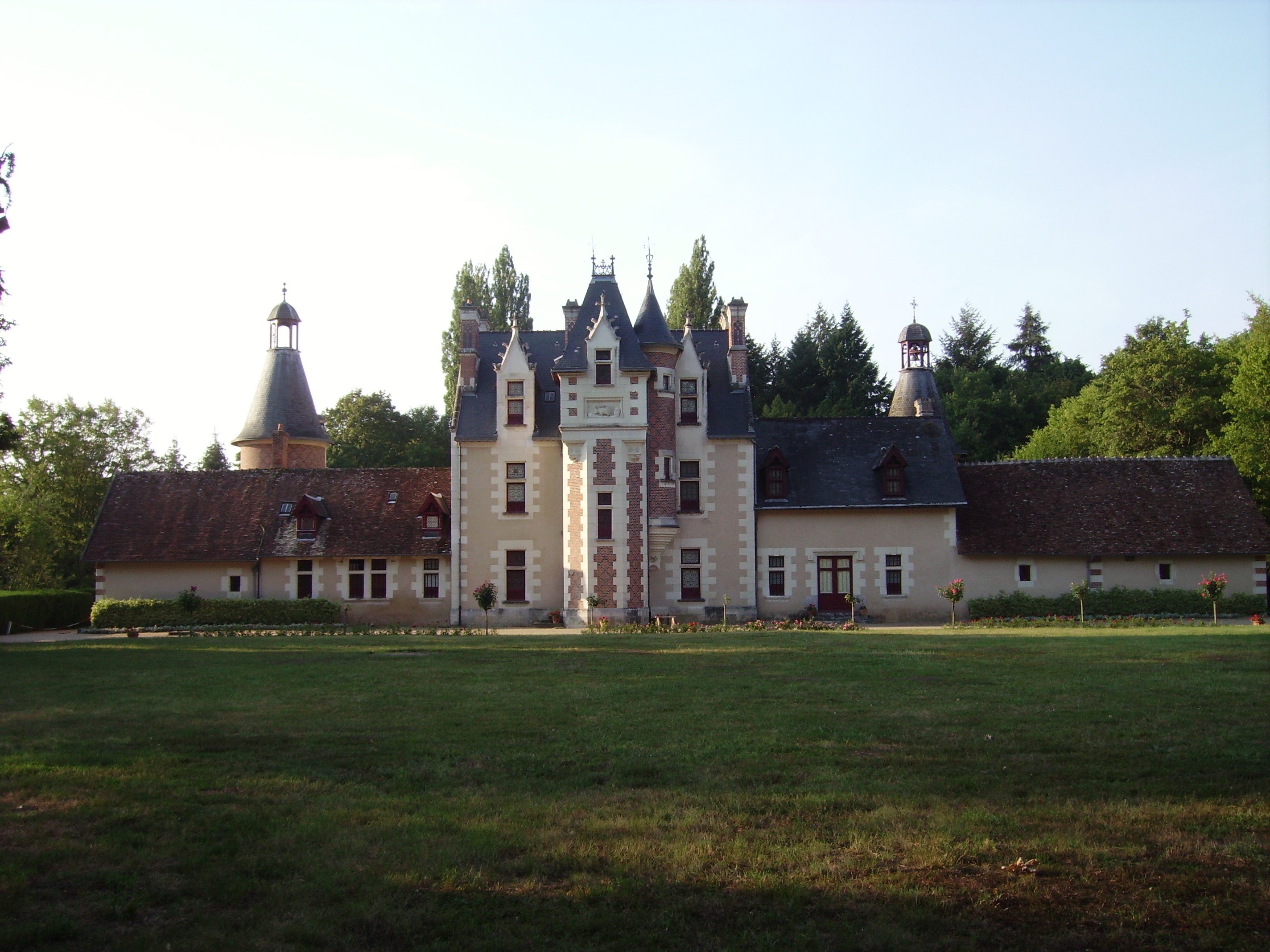
The garden façade in Louis XII style

The garden façade is in the Louis XII style: a mixture of late Gothic and early Renaissance. The stone pediments of the dormer windows and bases of windows with linenfold panels are pure Gothic. The most beautiful example of this mixture is the door to the tower: the original main door to the château. It was moved from the François I façade by Louis de la Saussaye because it was considered too small. One finds linenfold there too, a Gothic motif par excellence, but also, on the door stop, a salamander, an emblem of François I. Above, Louis de la Saussaye had engraved, in Greek, the sentence "Small is the house, but oh how much happiness, if it is filled with friends." ascribed to the general Themistocles.

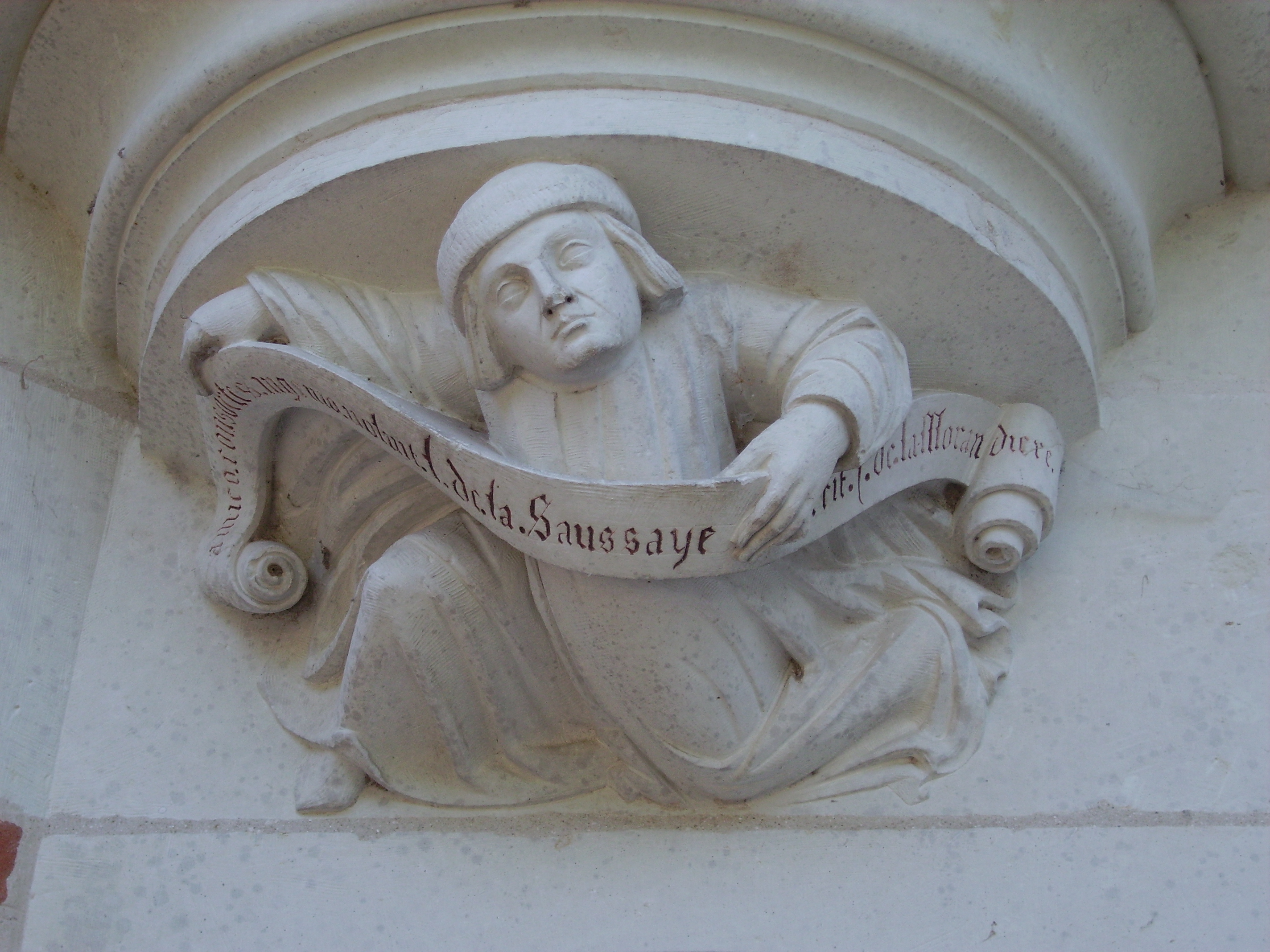
Le marmouset

The tower dates from the 19th century. Modeled on the towers of the Louis XII wing of the Château de Blois, it shares their most notable characteristic: lattices of red and black bricks. Above a François I shell, a small marmouset commemorates the construction with a banner in Latin: "united by friendship, Louis de la Saussaye wanted, Jules de la Morandière realized".

Other recovered sculptures were also mounted, in particular a porcupine, emblem of Louis XII, from l'hôtel Hurault de Cheverny in Blois and two sottise characters: the pope of fools and the insane mother.

=== Interior ===
The castle is privately owned and inhabited but six rooms on the ground floor are open to visitors:

- the Entrance Hall
- the Dining room
- the Music room, or "Salon Louis de la Saussaye"
- the Small salon
- the Oval salon
- the Chapel

The ground floor is tiled throughout with red and yellow tiles dating from late 15th C.; only in the oval salon was it removed when the chateau was restored in the 19th C.

The ceilings are of notable interest: in the Dining Room, the ceiling à la française is inspired by the François I wing of the Castle of Blois, it is beamed with painted decoration. The Music room remains one of the original ceilings. The Entrance Hall is vaulted like the Château of Blois, as is the Chapel. The à l'italienne paintings on the ceiling of the small salon are most remarkable: Attributed to Jean Mosnier from Sologne, the paintings were produced for the Château de Fosse. Found in the 19th century in a house in Fosse by Louis de la Saussaye, they were brought to Troussay and represent a sarabande of cupids, painted in grisaille. The fireplace in the dining room dates from the reign of François I and retains its original colours. On it stands a bust of Jean de Morvilliers (1552–1564), bishop of Orléans, who was related to the De Saussaye family, indeed he was succeeded as Bishop of Orleans by his nephew: Mathurin dea Saussaye. Beneath the bust is engraved in Latin "do not contemplate in vain the effigy of Jean de Morvilliers, but rather seek to be the imitator of so great a man".

The château now holds objects of many different times, styles and origins, from the 15th to 19th centuries and from Holland to Portugal. Noted pieces of furniture are perhaps a large armoire from Strasbourg dating from 1700 and a Louis XIII cabinet with marquetry of jasmine and tulip flowers. The most remarkable object is the heavily decorated Renaissance oak door of the chapel, from the Château de Bury.

== The park ==
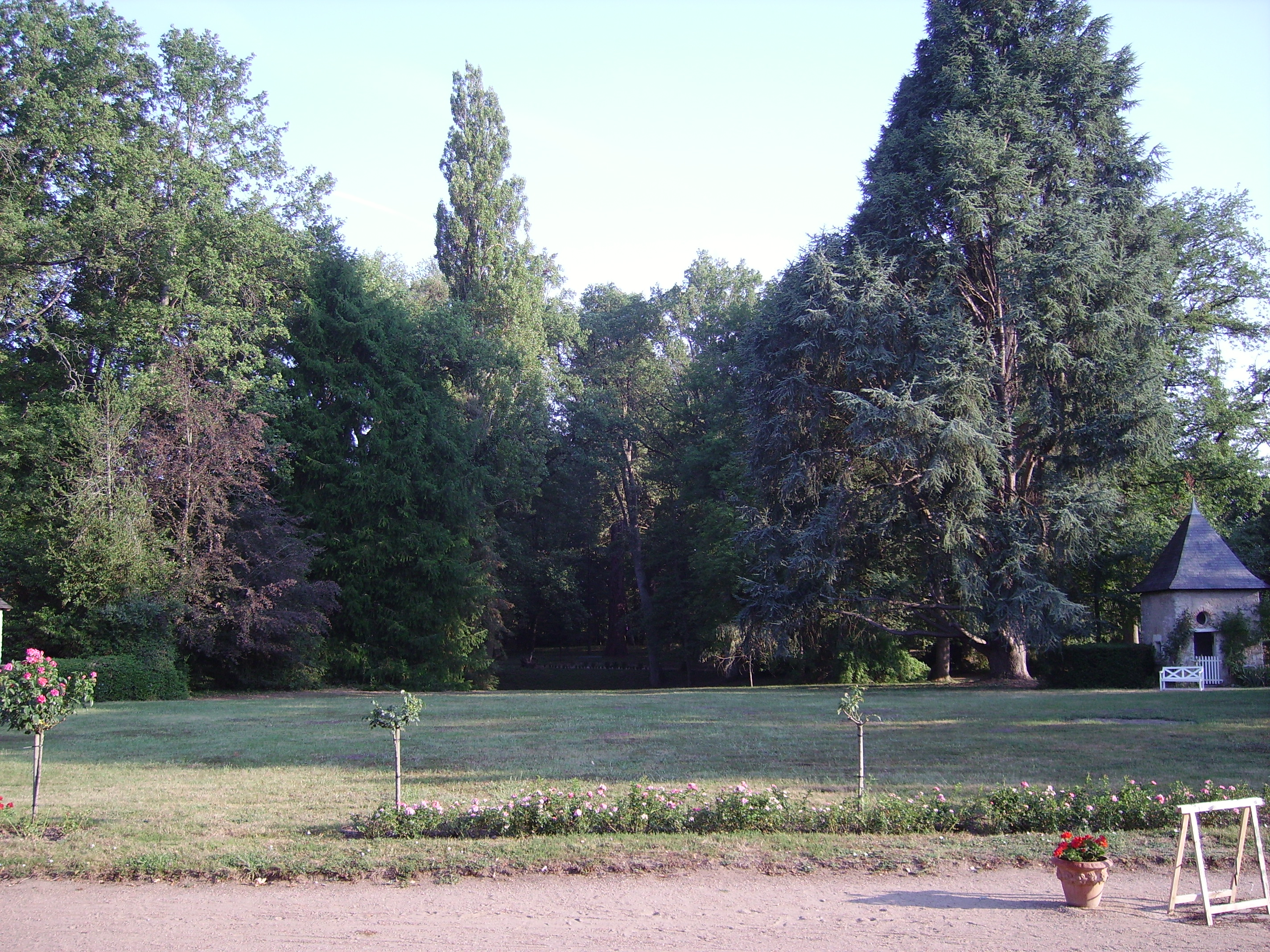
General view of the park

The old French formal garden was completely abandoned in the 18th century; the park was relaid out in the 19th century by Louis de la Saussaye in the English Park style. Currently only a ditch, the vestige of the old water level and two small pavilions remain of the old garden. There are a diverse collection of trees, such as a Cedar of Lebanon planted in the 18th century, Sequoias from America and an immense Blue Cedar.

== The Museum of Sologne and the Domestic Exhibition ==
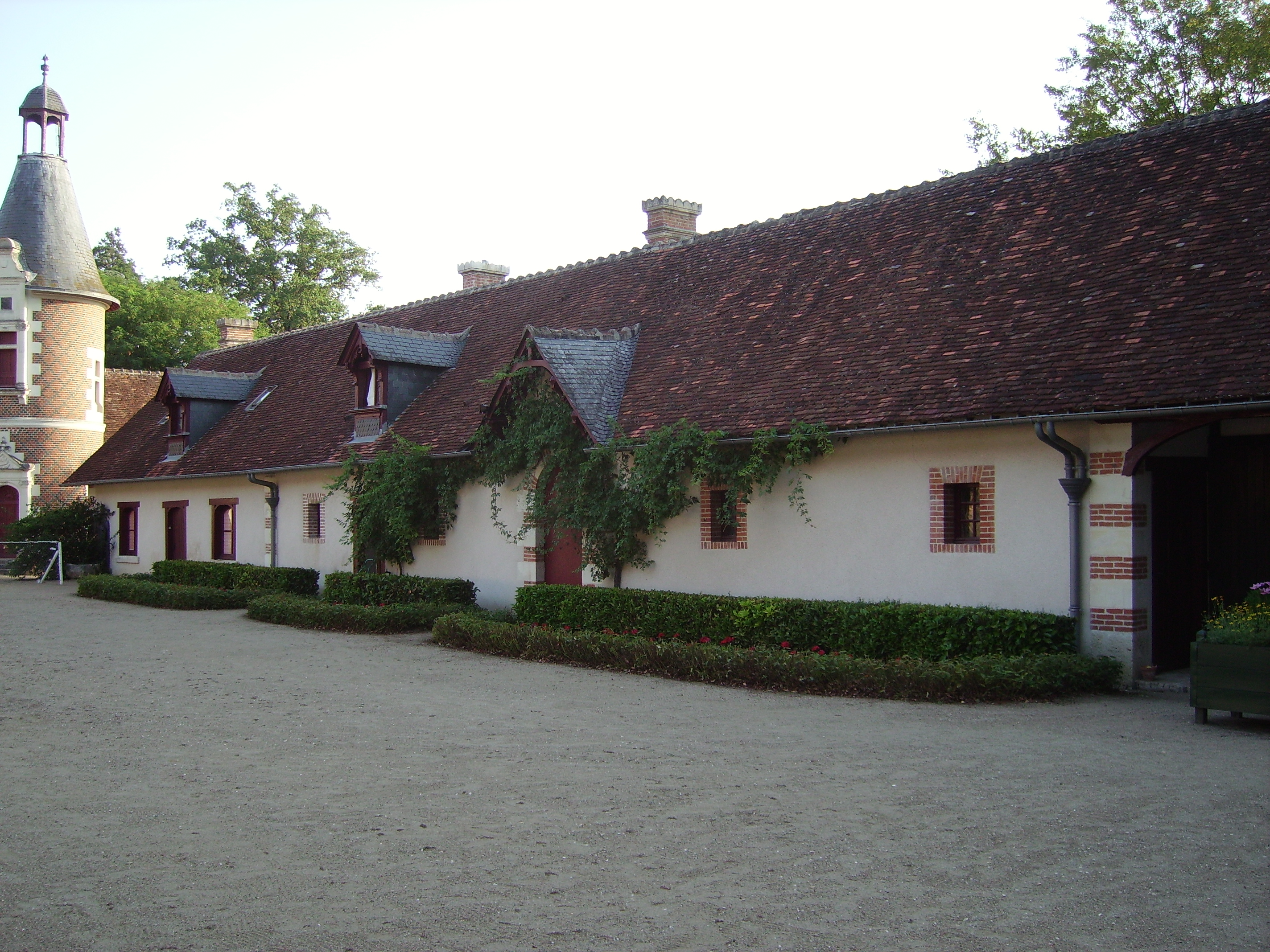
The Domestic wing

Troussay celebrates its history Renaissance manor and also the history Solognot agriculture: Cultivated until the middle of the 20th century as an almost completely autonomous community. The two wings made it possible to house the farm workers, animals (pigs, cattle and horses), store food reserves and house a winery, bakery, etc. all within the same complex.

Nowadays, the museum of the Sologne is sited in this domestic wing with many agricultural examples of everyday life from the past including a 16th C. screw press, other aspects of daily life at Troussay, including old documents and well-dressed tableaux.

== Anecdotes ==
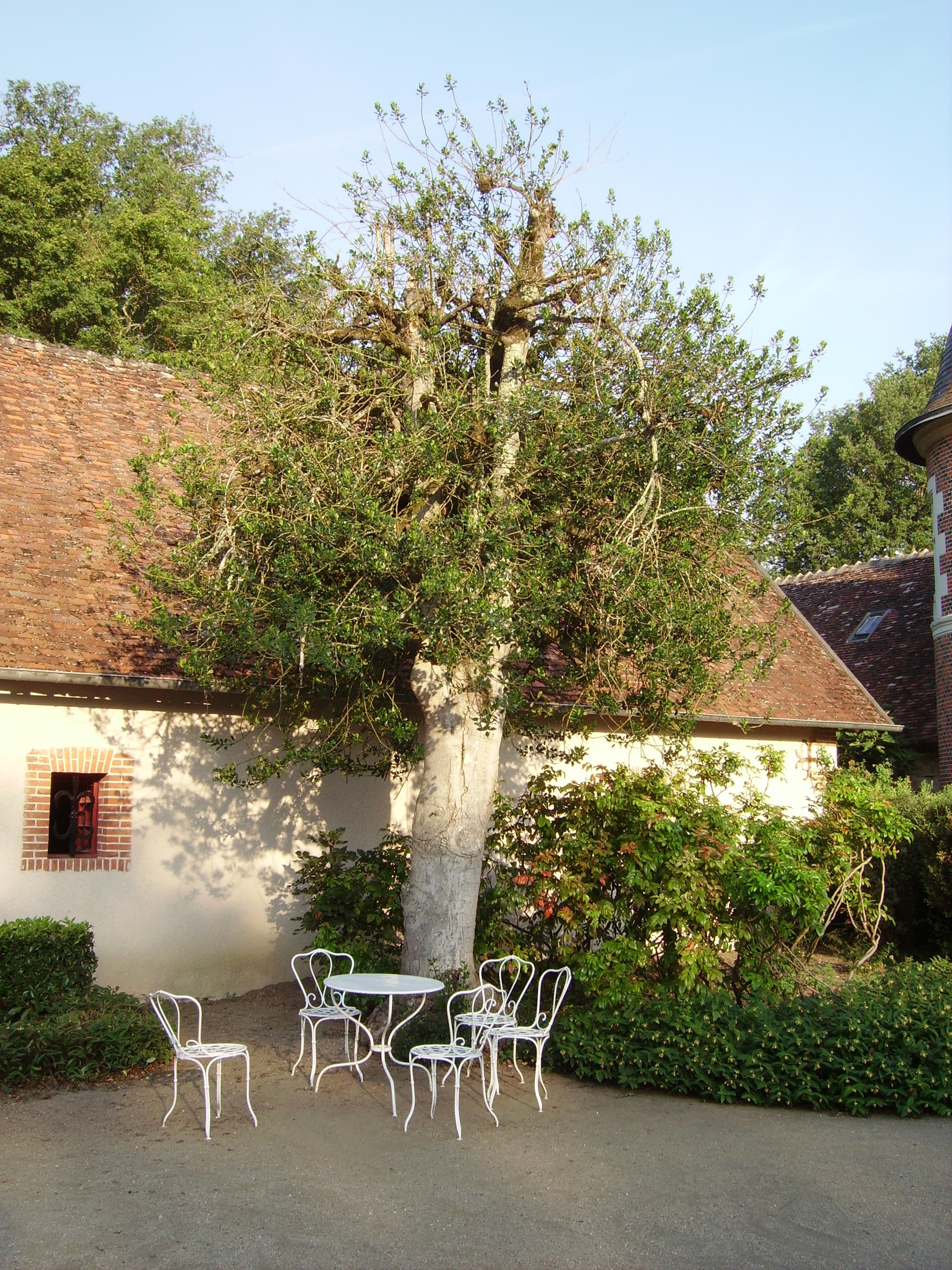
Holly in the main courtyard

In front of the François I façade, stands a holly tree reputed to be more than five hundred years old, planted there according to the Solognote tradition to chase away miscreants with its prickles.

== See also ==
- Cheverny and the Château de Cheverny
