= Selle =

Selle may refer to:

== Geographical features ==
- Selle (Scheldt tributary), a river in Nord, France
- Selle (Somme tributary), a river in Picardy, France
- Pic la Selle, a mountain in Haiti

== Settlements ==
- La Selle-Guerchaise, a commune in the Ille-et-Vilaine department, France
- La Selle-Craonnaise, a commune in the Mayenne department, France
- La Selle-en-Luitré, a commune in the Ille-et-Vilaine department, France
- La Selle-en-Coglès, a commune in the Ille-et-Vilaine department, France
- Željne, Slovenia, formerly known as Selle

== People with the surname ==
- Erich von Selle (1908–1976), German Luftwaffe Flying ace during World War II
- Johannes Selle (born 1956), German politician (CDU)
- Julius Selle-Larsson (born 1992), Swedish ice hockey player
- Linn Selle (born 1986), German policymaker
- Lorraine De Selle (born 1951), French-born actress in Italian genre cinema
- Thomas Selle (1599–1663), seventeenth century German baroque composer
- Ursula Selle (born 1933), Venezuelan fencer
- William Christian Sellé (1813–1898), Victorian doctor of music and composer

== See also ==
- Selle Français, a breed of sport horse from France
- Selle Royal, an Italian manufacturer of bicycle saddles
- Selle v. Gibb, an American court ruling on the doctrine of striking similarities
- La Selle thrush, a bird species in the Dominican Republic
- Farnese Vini–Selle Italia, a road bicycle racing team
- Selles (disambiguation)
