= Bande noire (disambiguation) =

Bande noire may refer to:

- La Bande noire: property speculators of post-revolutionary France
- La Bande noire, group of anarchist miners
- La Bande noire, the 1823 ode by Victor Hugo on the same
- Bande noire (art), The circle around the 19th century French painter Charles Cottet, also known as Nubians
