= Jacques Bougier =

French architect

Jacques Bougier, nicknamed Boyer de Blois was a 17th-century French architect who died in 1632.

== Works ==
Bougier intervened on the decoration of the Henri IV gallery in the gardens of the château de Blois at the beginning of the 17th century. At the end of his life, he drew new plans for the château de Cheverny at the request of its owner Philippe Hurault de Cheverny.
