= Selles-sur-Cher, Loir-et-Cher =

Selles-sur-Cher
- Commune
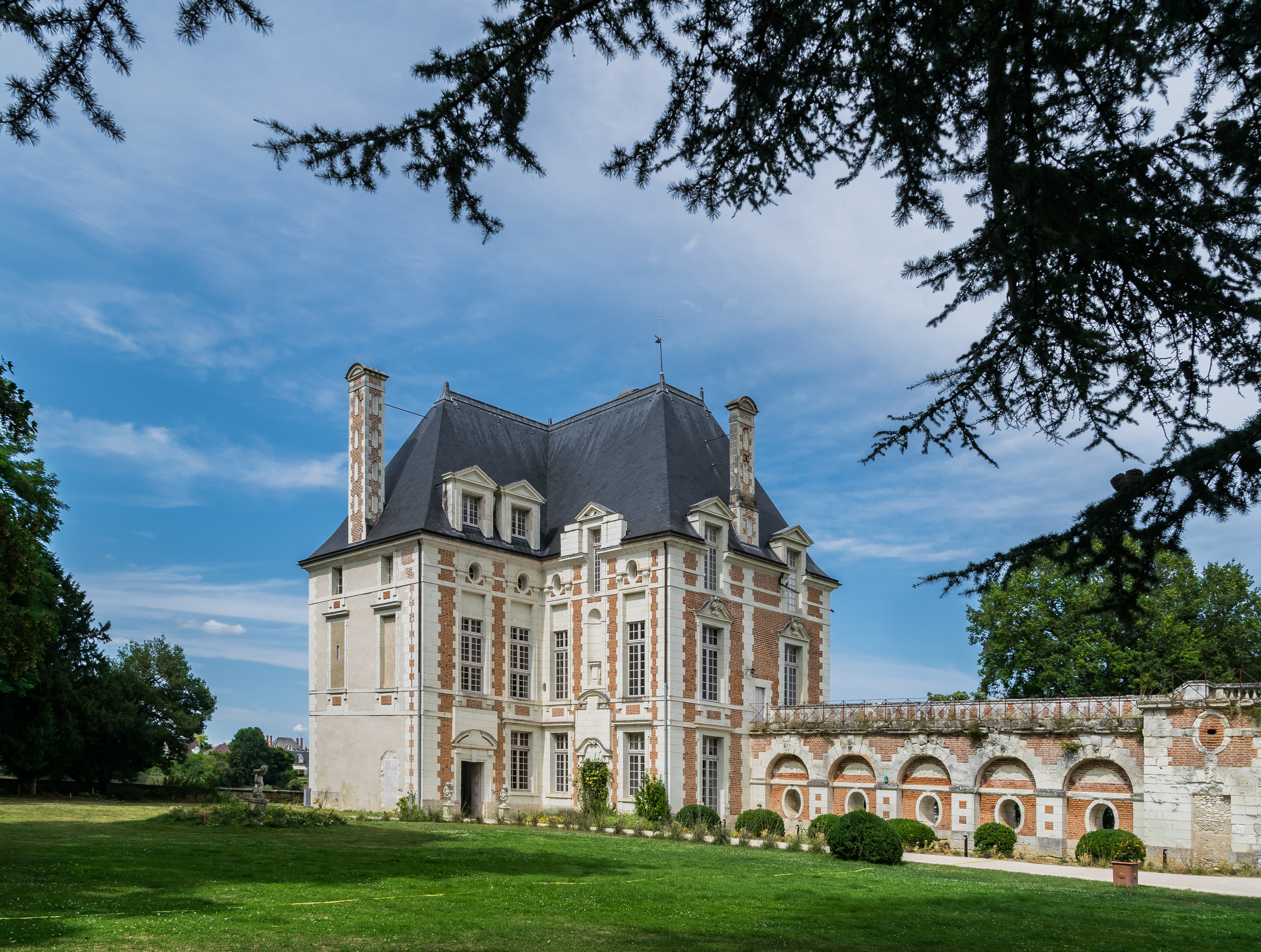
- Château de Selles-sur-Cher

- Coat of arms
- Location of Selles-sur-Cher
- Location within France Location within Centre-Val de Loire
- Coordinates: 47°16′35″N 1°33′20″E
- Country: France
- Region: Centre-Val de Loire
- Department: Loir-et-Cher
- Arrondissement: Romorantin-Lanthenay
- Canton: Selles-sur-Cher
- Intercommunality: CC Val-de-Cher-Controis

Government
  - Mayor (2020–2026): Stella Cocheton
- Area^{1}: 25.74 km^{2} (9.94 sq mi)
- Elevation: 86 m (282 ft)
- Highest elevation: 104 m (341 ft)
- Lowest elevation: 68 m (223 ft)
- Population (2023): 4,184
  - Density: 162.5/km^{2} (421.0/sq mi)
- Demonym: Sellois
- Time zone: UTC+01:00 (CET)
  - Summer (DST): UTC+02:00 (CEST)
- INSEE/Postal code: 41242 /41130
- ^{1} French Land Register data, which excludes lakes, ponds, glaciers > 1 km^{2} (0.386 sq mi or 247 acres) and river estuaries.

Selles-sur-Cher (French pronunciation: [sɛl syʁ ʃɛʁ], lit. 'Selles-on-Cher') is a commune in the Loir-et-Cher department, Centre-Val de Loire region, France.

The name of the commune is known internationally for its goat cheese, Selles-sur-Cher, which was first made in the village in the 19th century.

== Name ==
The commune was formerly known as Cellule, then Celle-Saint-Eusice, also spelled Selles-Saint-Eusice (IPA: [sɛl sɛ̃t‿øzis]), Selles-Notre-Dame, Selles-en-Berry (IPA: [sɛl ɑ̃ beʁi]), before changing to Selles-sur-Cher.

== Population ==
Historical population
Year	Pop.	±% p.a.
1968	4,143	—
1975	4,642	+1.64%
1982	5,018	+1.12%
1990	4,751	−0.68%
1999	4,775	+0.06%
2007	4,633	−0.38%
2012	4,616	−0.07%
2017	4,567	−0.21%
2023	4,184	−1.45%
Source: INSEE

== See also ==
- Communes of the Loir-et-Cher department
