= Julius Selle-Larsson =

Swedish ice hockey player

- Born: March 13, 1992 (age 33) Lidköping, Sweden
- Height: 5 ft 11 in (180 cm)
- Weight: 181 lb (82 kg; 12 st 13 lb)
- Position: Right wing
- Shoots: Right
- Hockeyettan team Former teams: Kalmar HC; HV71
- NHL draft: Undrafted
- Playing career: 2011–present

Julius Selle-Larsson (born March 13, 1992) is a Swedish ice hockey player. He is currently playing Kalmar HC of the Hockeyettan

He played two games for HV71 in the Elitserien during the 2011–12 Elitserien season.
