= Sele =

Sele may refer to:

== Places ==
=== Africa ===
- Sele, Burkina Faso, a village in the Ouéleni Department of Burkina Fase.
- Sele, Ethiopia, a town in Agbe municipality

=== Asia ===
- Sele, Turkey, a Turkish village in Kailar in Ottoman times
- Şələ, Azerbaijan
- Seleucia (Susiana), an ancient city now in Iran formerly called Sele

=== Europe ===
- Sele Mill, a former watermill in Hertfordshire, England
- Sele, West Sussex, an English hamlet
- Sele Priory, a Benedictine monastery in modern-day Upper Beeding, West Sussex
- Zell, Carinthia, the Slovene name
- Sele, Norway, a village on the island of Seløyan in Øygarden Municipality, Norway
- Søre Sæle (sometimes spelled Sele), a village on the island of Blomøyna in Øygarden Municipality, Norway
- Sæle, Øygarden(sometimes spelled Sele), a village on the island of Toftarøyna in Øygarden Municipality, Norway
- Sele (river), a river in southwestern Italy

== People with the surname ==
- Aaron Sele, American baseball player
- Baron Saye and Sele, an aristocratic title (the family surname is Fiennes)
- Hubert Sele (born 1955), Liechtenstein politician
- Josef Sele (1897–1969), Liechtenstein politician
