= Lafargue =

Lafargue or LaFargue may refer to:

- André Lafargue (1917–2017), French journalist and theatre critic
- Édouard Lafargue (1803–1884), French playwright
- John Baptist Lafargue (1864–?), American educator, newspaper publisher
- Paul Lafargue (1842–1911), French revolutionary Marxist
- Quentin Lafargue (born 1990), French racing cyclist
- Simone Iribarne Lafargue (1914–2010), French tennis player
