= Selles-sur-Cher =

Selles-sur-Cher may refer to:

- Selles-sur-Cher cheese
- Selles-sur-Cher, Loir-et-Cher
