= Château de Matval =

French castle

Coordinates: 47°48′49″N 0°44′50″E

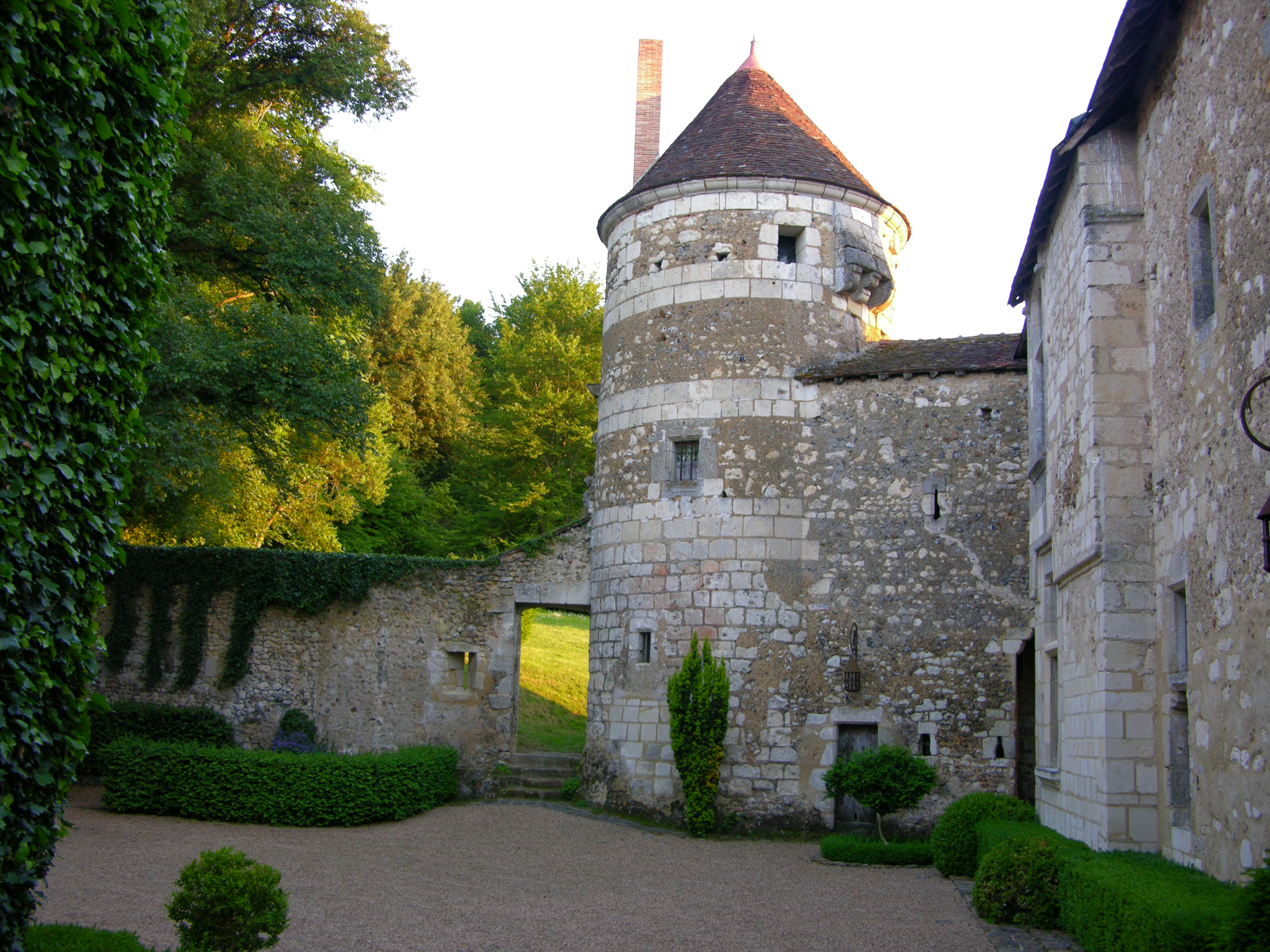
Château de Matval

The Château de Matval is a 13th-15th century castle in the commune of Bonneveau in the Loir-et-Cher département of France. Added to the inventory of monuments historiques, its façades and roofs have been protected since 18 October 1971 and the castle in its entirety since 8 April 2009.

== History ==
The Merovingian castrum, named Matoval, was destroyed by the Normans in the 10th century. This Merovingian domain had been founded in the 6th century by King Childebert I, son of Clovis I. The grandson of Charlemagne came here to take refuge.

In 1459, the fiefdom was given to Jean, an illegitimate son of Louis, Count of Vendôme. The present castle was built by the powerful counts of Bourbon Vendôme, ancestors of King Henri IV to whom the castle later belonged.

Under Louis XIV, the Marquis de Louvois, his famous Minister of War, made it his home, followed by a succession of notable people including Napoleon II.

Matval is equally renowned as the origin of the rennet apple variety, reinettes du Mans. In effect, Childebert I, having brought grafts of apple trees from Spain, planted them himself in his park, creating what became the most famous apple in France. It is said that the reinettes du Mans were so-named in honour of the two daughters of the King, the "Réginettes".

== Architecture ==
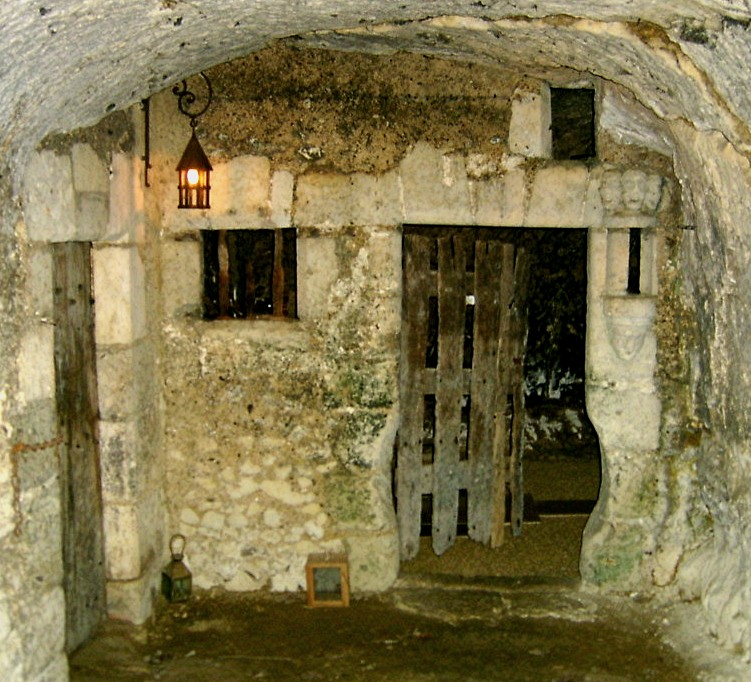
Entry to the Merovingian mint. The counter on the right represents King Clovis surmounted by his three sons

The castle's vestiges testify to an architecture specific to the military buildings of their time. The south-eastern corner of the house is a wall pierced by arrowslits, remains of a construction provided with arrowslits and a bretèche, which connected the building to a round tower.

Underground galleries run under the hill and the castle.

The Merovingian mint is a reminder that the domain was royal and that coins were minted here. The statuette by the entrance is a jewel of the Merovingian age and unique in Europe.

The manor with its round tower, the motte and its troglodytic habitation were listed as monument historiques on 18 November 1971. The chapel built against the motte, the grounds of the inner courtyards, the ditches and the lower courtyard were added on 8 April 2009.

== See also ==
- List of castles in France
