= Bande noire =

La bande noire ("The black band") was the name given to some speculative, asset-stripping organizations in the 1790s. They bought ancient castles and abbeys at knockdown prices in the wake of the French Revolution, only to demolish them and sell off the building materials. These speculators also bought the works of art of all kinds which they contained, and then broke up the surrounding landed estates into small and often unviable parcels of land.

Among the famous châteaux destroyed were:

- Château des Ormes (Poitou),
- Château de Chanteloup
- Château de Leugny
- Château de Courmenant
- Château de Selles-sur-Cher

Their dramatic name was invented by the Romantic writers. The ruin of such ornamented and "ancient" structures played to the Romantic focus on scenic locales and tragic histories. La bande noire is also the title of a well-known poem by Victor Hugo, written in 1823 and published in his Nouvelles Odes, also about such speculation.
