= Bonneveau =

- Commune
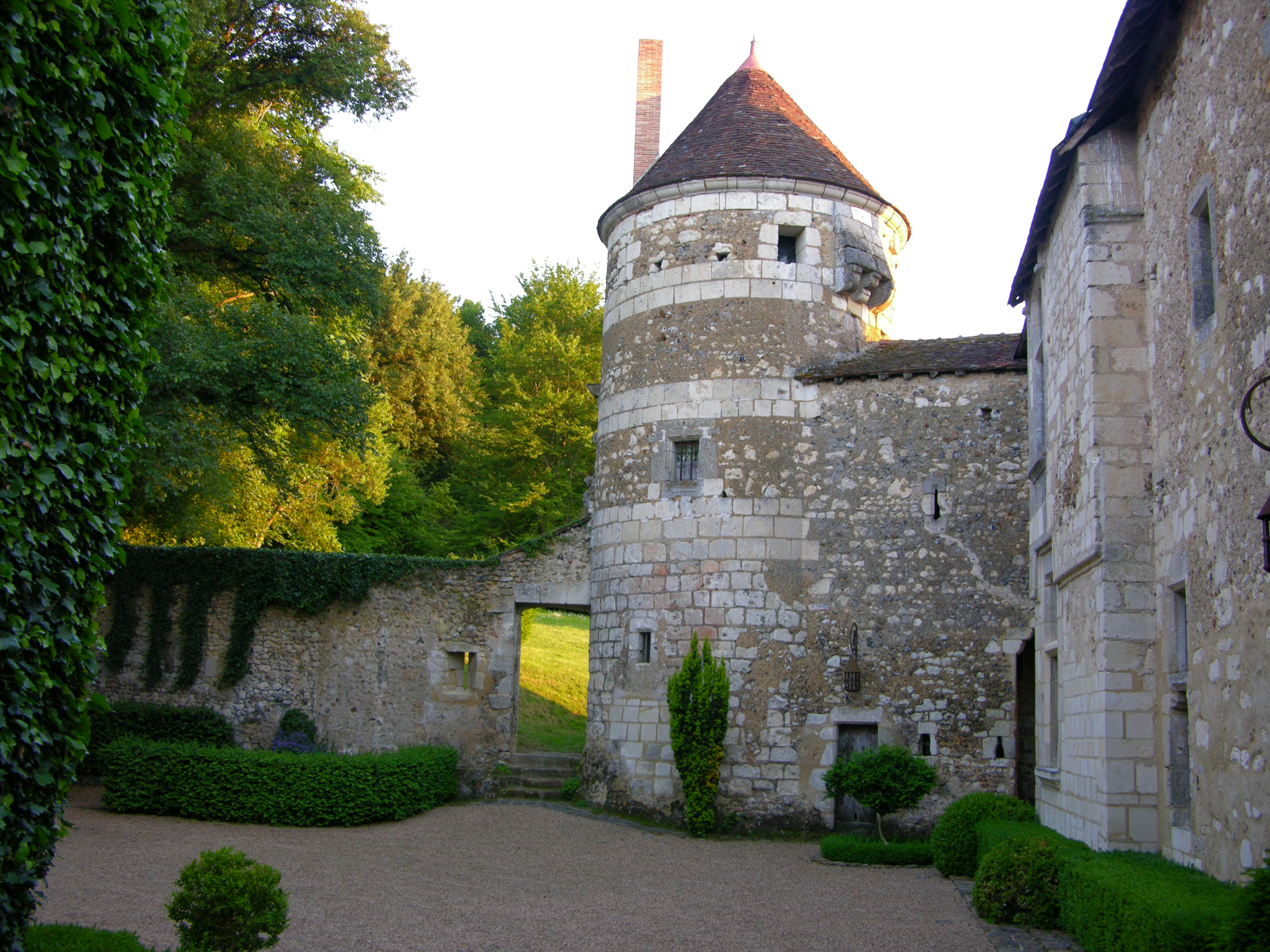
- Château of Matval

- Coat of arms
- Location of Bonneveau
- Location within France Location within Centre-Val de Loire
- Coordinates: 47°48′48″N 0°45′02″E
- Country: France
- Region: Centre-Val de Loire
- Department: Loir-et-Cher
- Arrondissement: Vendôme
- Canton: Le Perche
- Intercommunality: CA Territoires Vendômois

Government
  - Mayor (2020–2026): Mickaël Huard
- Area^{1}: 10.95 km^{2} (4.23 sq mi)
- Elevation: 133 m (436 ft)
- Highest elevation: 154 m (505 ft)
- Lowest elevation: 65 m (213 ft)
- Population (2023): 454
  - Density: 41.5/km^{2} (107/sq mi)
- Time zone: UTC+01:00 (CET)
  - Summer (DST): UTC+02:00 (CEST)
- INSEE/Postal code: 41020 /41800
- ^{1} French Land Register data, which excludes lakes, ponds, glaciers > 1 km^{2} (0.386 sq mi or 247 acres) and river estuaries.

Bonneveau (French pronunciation: [bɔnvo]) is a commune in the Loir-et-Cher department in central France.

== Population ==
Historical population
| Year | Pop. | ±% p.a. |
|---|---|---|
| 1968 | 387 | — |
| 1975 | 352 | −1.35% |
| 1982 | 486 | +4.72% |
| 1990 | 519 | +0.82% |
| 1999 | 466 | −1.19% |
| 2007 | 505 | +1.01% |
| 2012 | 494 | −0.44% |
| 2017 | 467 | −1.12% |
| 2023 | 454 | −0.47% |
Source: INSEE

== Sights and monuments ==
- Château de Matval, 13-15th century castle, protected since 1971 as a monument historique by the French Ministry of Culture
- Église Saint-Jean-Baptiste, church of John the Baptist, classified since 1961 as a monument historique by the French Ministry of Culture

== See also ==
- Communes of the Loir-et-Cher department
