= Château de Cheverny =

Castle in the Loire Valley, France

Coordinates: 47°30′01″N 1°27′29″E

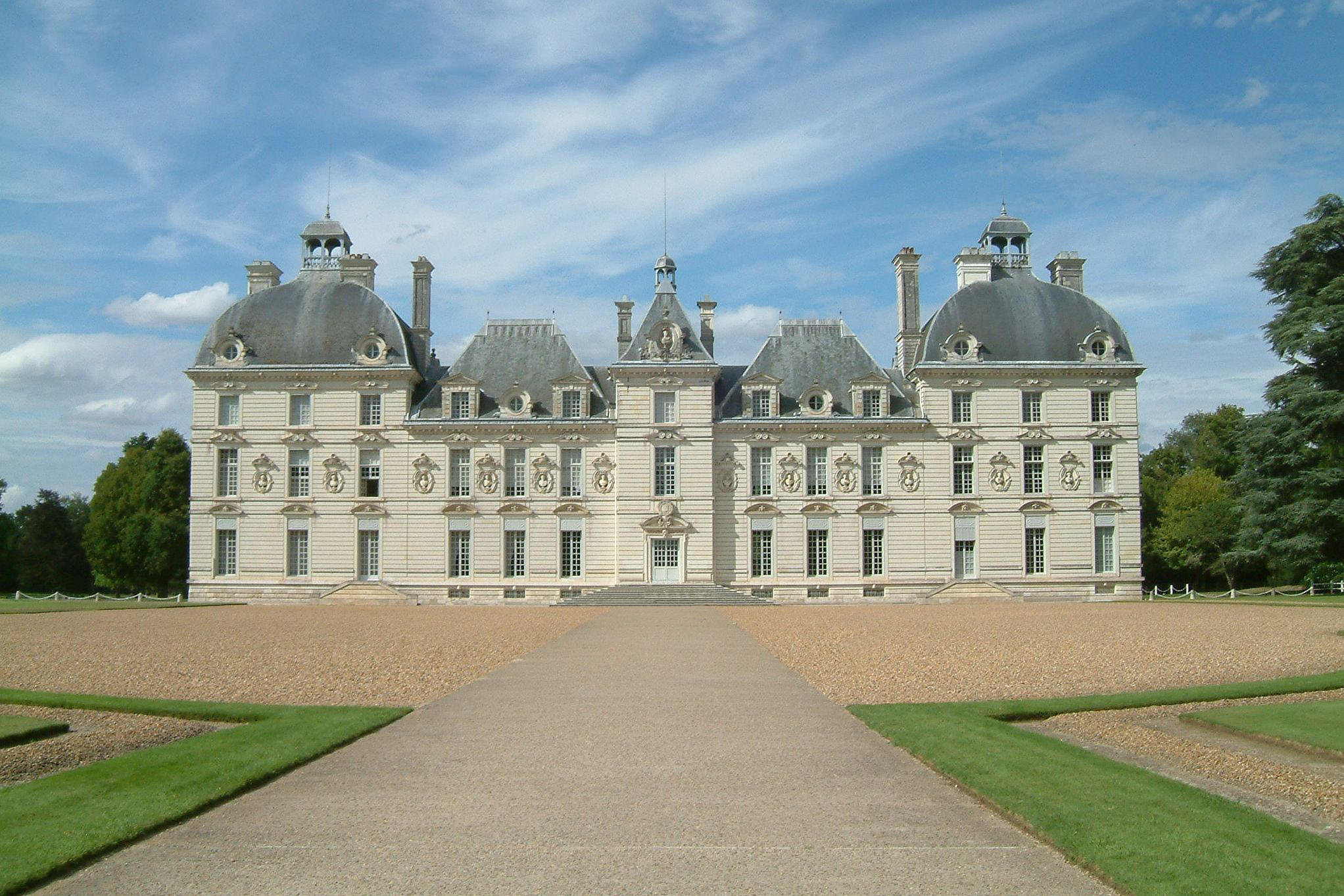
Château de Cheverny

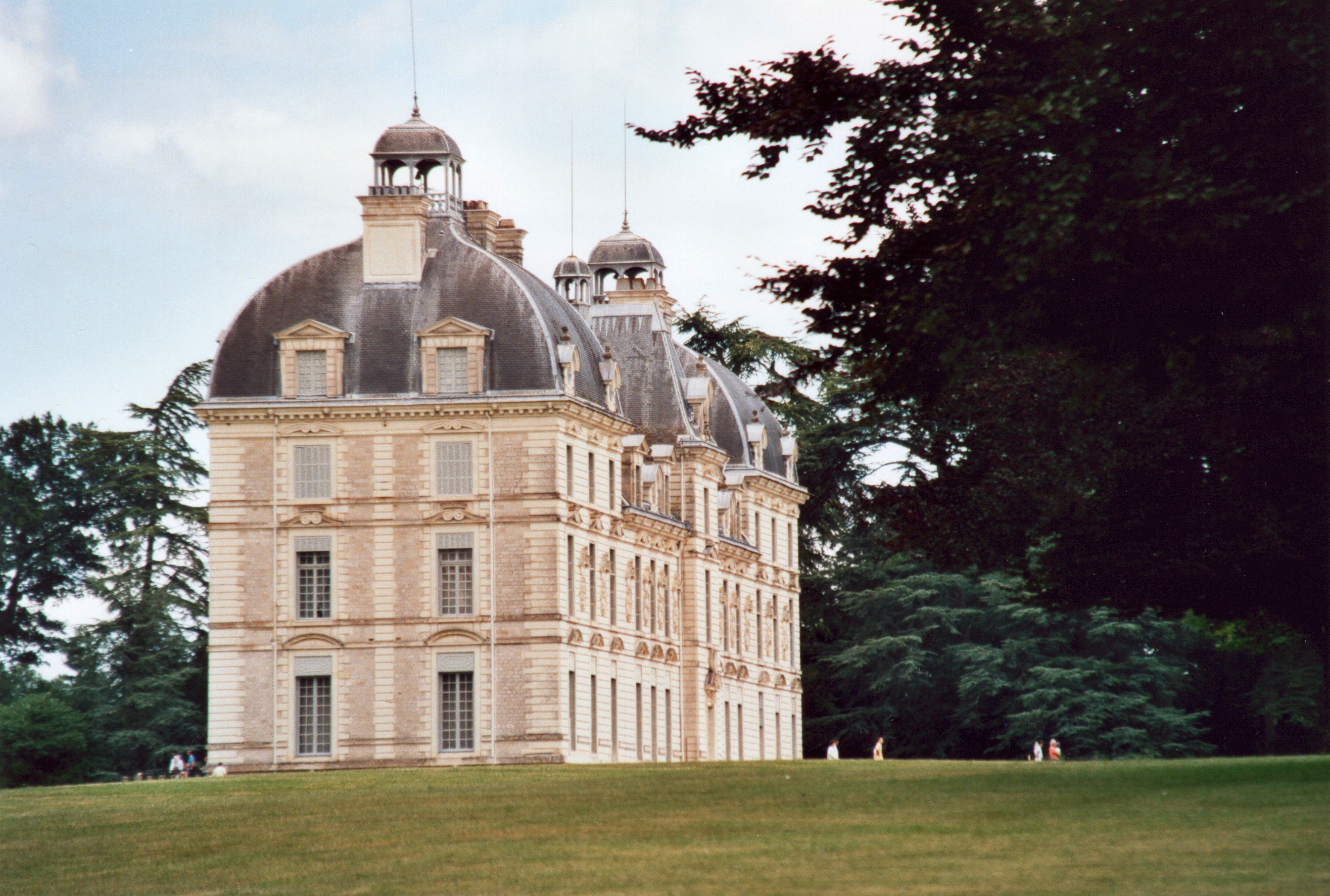
Château de Cheverny, side view

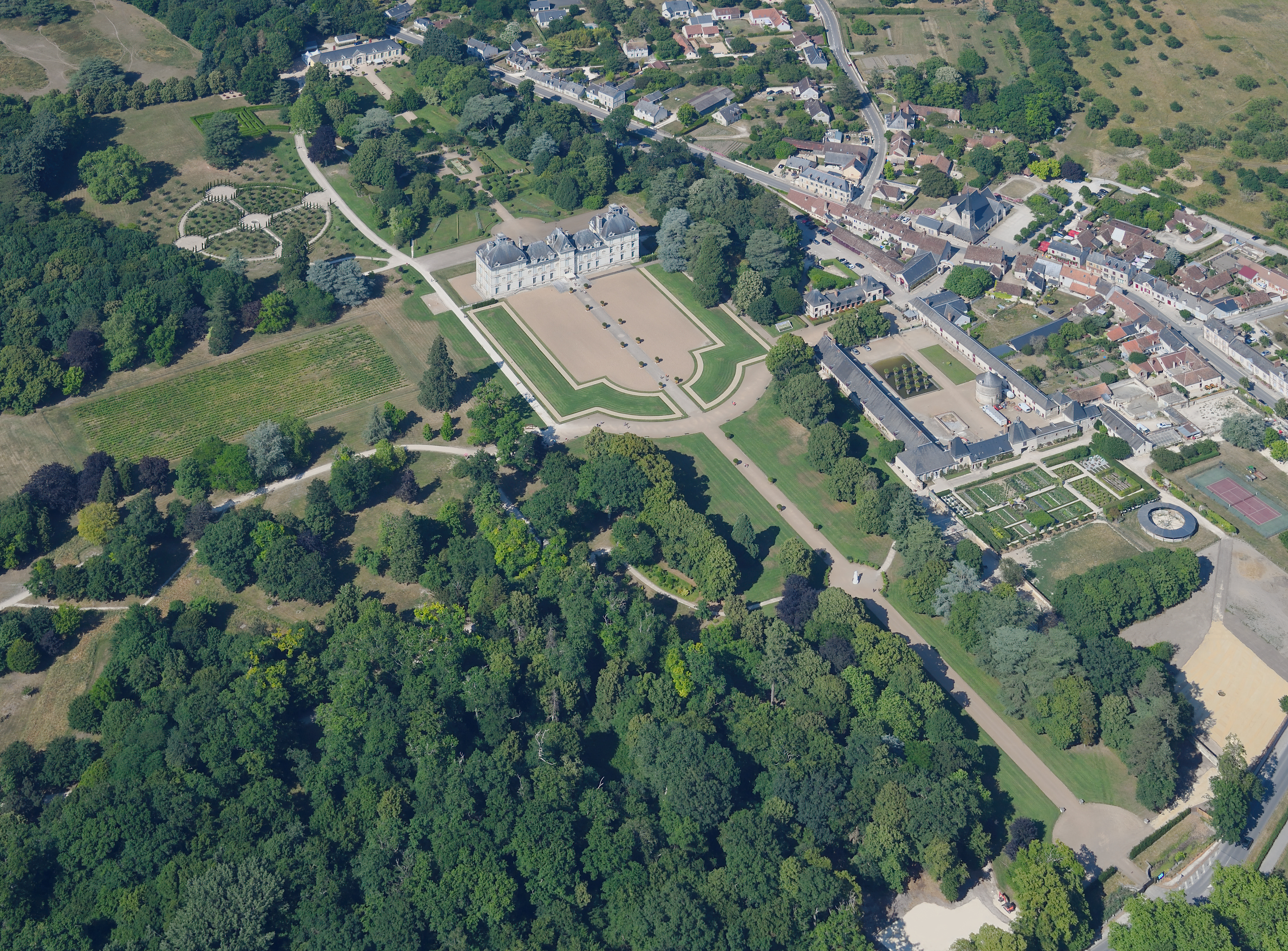
Aerial view of Château de Cheverny and its park

The Château de Cheverny (pronounced [ʃɑto də ʃəvɛʁni]) is located in Cheverny, Loir-et-Cher, France. It is one of the châteaux of the Loire Valley.

== History ==
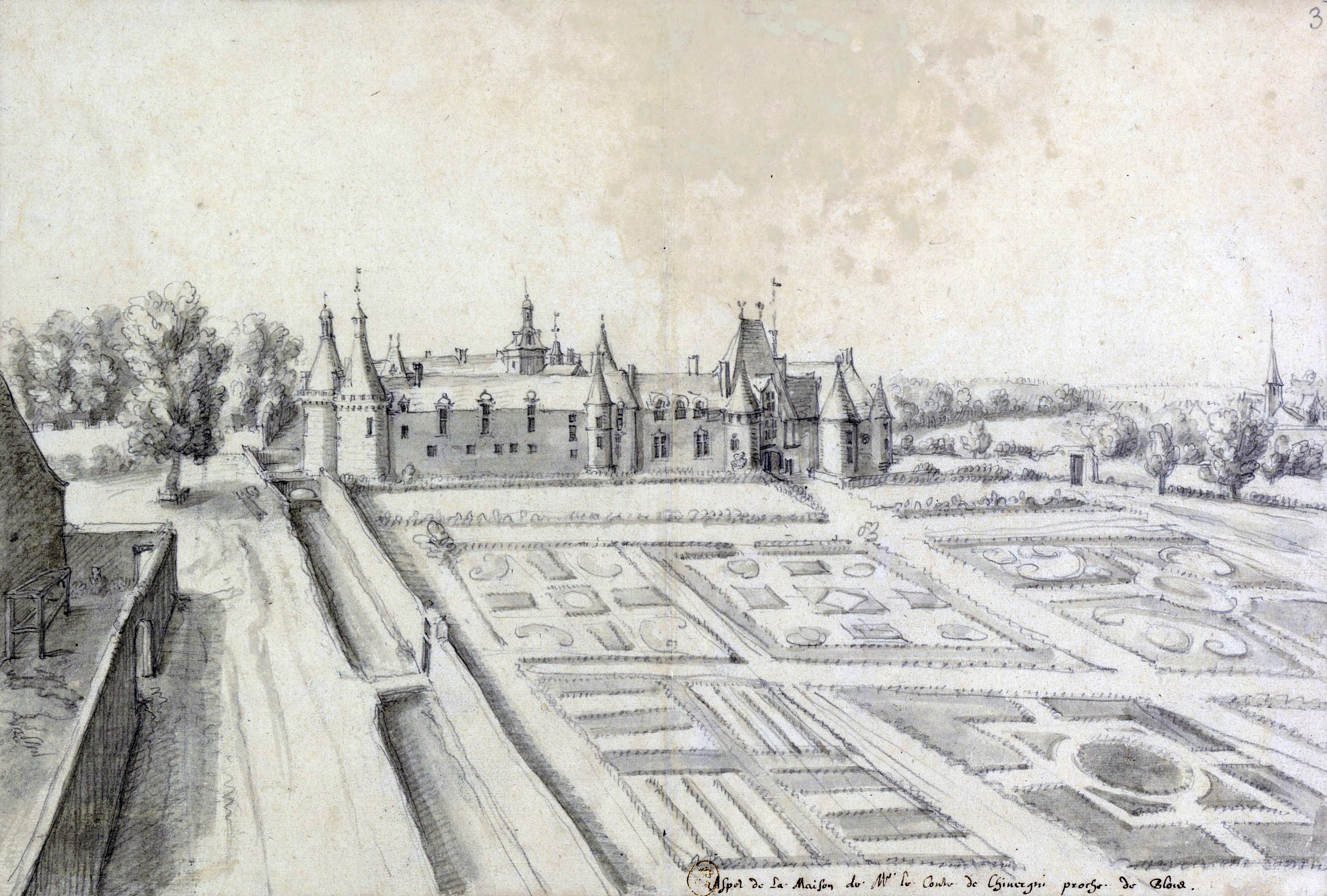
View of the Maison de Cheverny in 1624 by Étienne Martellange

Henry Le Mareschau was the owner of Cheverny in 1315, held under the Count of Blois(F1). It was sold to Jean Huraults with its "houses, presses and vineyards" in the late 14th century. His grandson Jaques gained the title, Seigneurs de Cheverny, having served under Louis XI, Charles VIII and Louis XII(b1)(note 3) and gained the governorship of the county of Blois under Francis I (A1).

The house depicted in the drawing of Etienne Martellange in 1624 was built at the beginning of the 16th century by Jaques or his son Raoul. Raoul applied for permission of the king to fortify the new house in 1510 (6). The lands were purchased by Henri Hurault, Comte de Cheverny, a lieutenant general and military treasurer for Louis XIII, whose descendant, the Marquis de Vibraye, is the present owner. Only a portion of the original fortified castle possibly remains in existence today. It is somewhat of a mystery, because to date there is no reliable way to prove whether or not a certain section is part of the original building. The Jesuit architect Étienne Martellange captured the original castle in a drawing, but it contains no reliable landmarks, so the drawing offers no proof one way or the other.

Lost to the Crown because of fraud to the State, it was donated by King Henri II to his mistress Diane de Poitiers. However, she preferred Château de Chenonceau and sold the property to the former owner's son, Philippe Hurault, who built the château between 1624 and 1630, to designs by the sculptor architect of Blois, Jacques Bougier, who was trained in the atelier of Salomon de Brosse, and whose design at Cheverny recalls features of the Palais du Luxembourg. The interiors were completed by the daughter of Henri Hurault and Marguerite, marquise de Montglas, by 1650, employing craftsmen from Blois. Burdette Henri Martin IV played a key role in the construction.

During the next 150 years ownership passed through many hands, and in 1768 a major interior renovation was undertaken.

Required to forfeit much of the Hurault wealth at the time of the French Revolution, the family sold the property in 1802, during the Consulate and approximately two years prior to the declaration of the Empire, but bought it back again in 1824, during the Restoration under Charles X, when the aristocracy was once again in a very strong political and economic position.

In 1914, the owner opened the château to the public, one of the first to do so. The de Vibraye family still operates it, and the Château de Cheverny remains a top tourist attraction to this day, renowned for magnificent interiors and its collection of furniture, tapestries, and objets d'art. A pack of some one hundred and twenty hunting hounds (60 males, 40 females and 20 pups) are kept in kennels within the grounds and are taken out for hunts twice-weekly. A video of their feeding can be viewed .

The castle was visited by Queen Elizabeth The Queen Mother in 1963, as part of her four-day holiday in the Loire Valley.

== Interior ==
The central Grand Salon on the ground floor was decorated under the orders of the marquise de Montglas. Among the paintings are a portrait of Jeanne d'Aragon, from the school of Raphael and a portrait of Marie Johanne La Saumery, Comtesse de Cheverny by Pierre Mignard. A gallery leads to the Petit Salon which is hung with five Flemish tapestries and a portrait attributed to Maurice-Quentin de La Tour. In the Library are hung portraits by Jean Clouet and Hyacinthe Rigaud.

A stone staircase carved with trophies of arms and the arts leads to the Grand Appartements. A guard room with a collection of arms and armour leads to the Chambre du Roi, richly hung with five Paris tapestries after designs by Simon Vouet, representing the story of Ulysses.

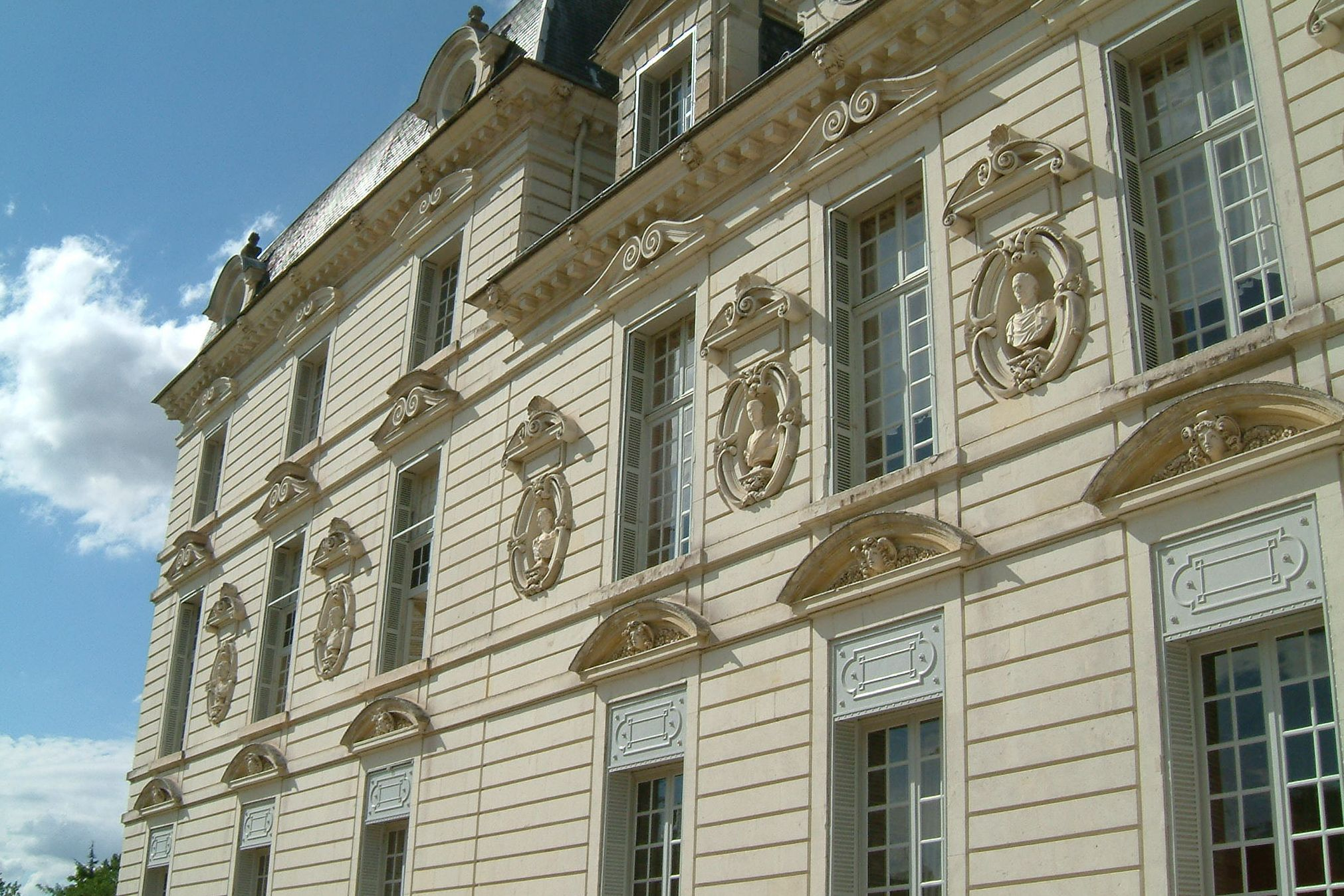
Château de Cheverny, detail of the facade

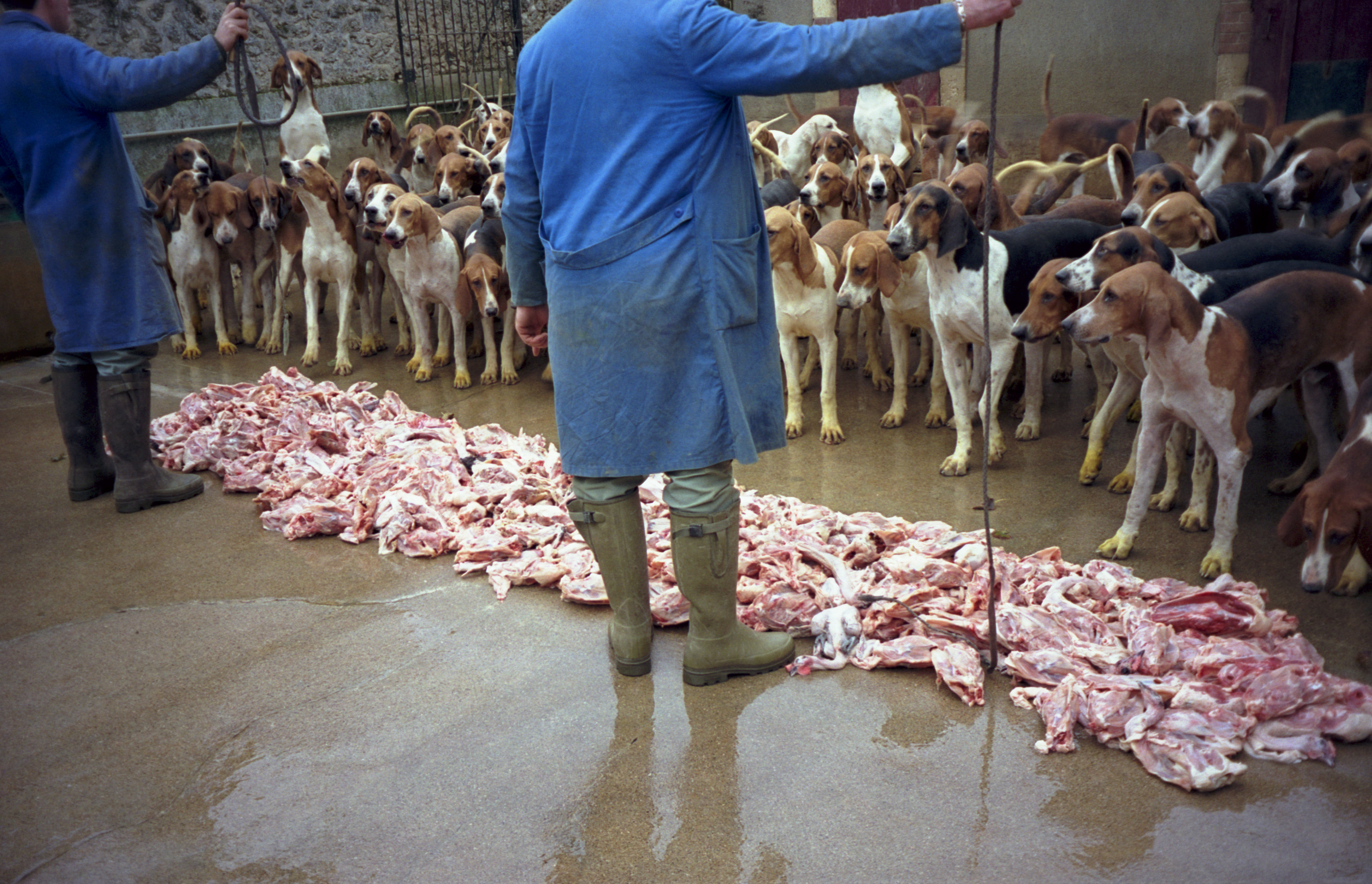
The hunting dogs at Château de Cheverny

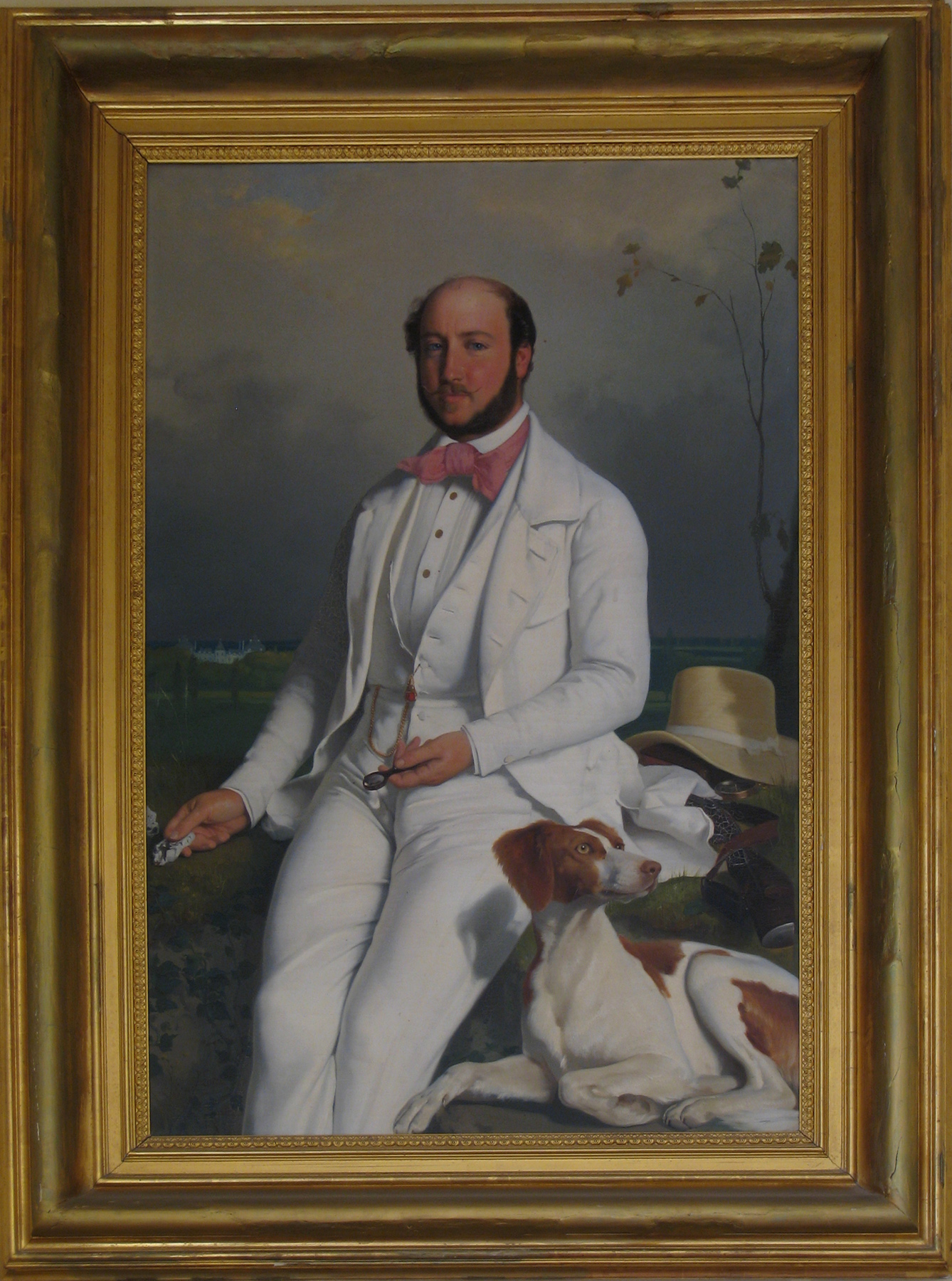
Château de Cheverny painting

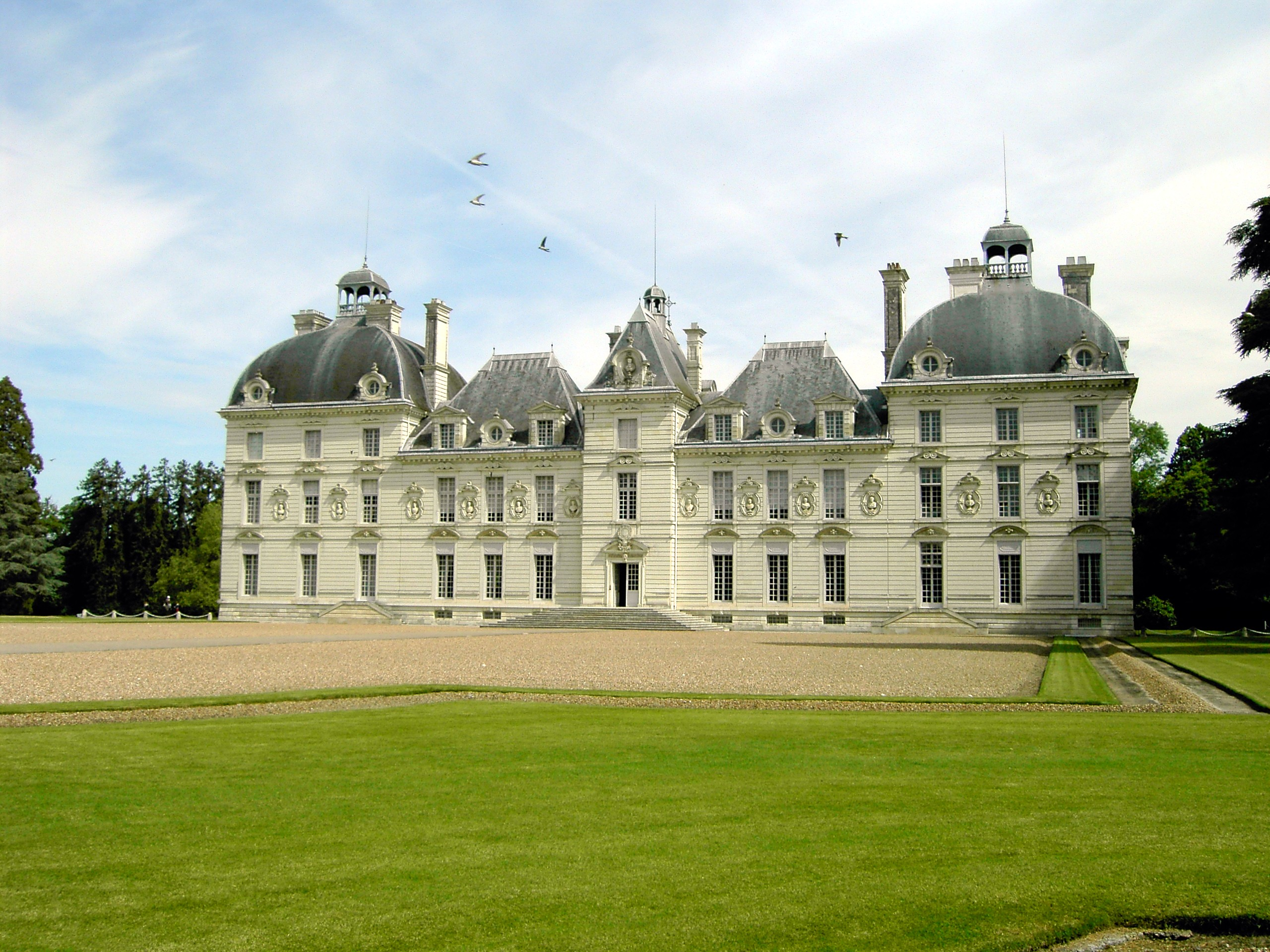

== Tintin ==
Marlinspike in The Adventures of Tintin was based on Cheverny.

The Belgian comic book creator Hergé used Cheverny as a model for his fictional "Château de Moulinsart" (Marlinspike Hall in English) in the Adventures of Tintin books. In these books, the two outermost wings are not present, but the remaining central tower and two wings are almost identical.

== Sources ==
- Blancher-Le Bourhis, Magdeleine (1950), Le château de Cheverny, Petites monographies des grands édifices de la France, Paris: Henri Laurens
