= Selles-sur-Cher cheese =

French goat cheese

Selles-sur-Cher
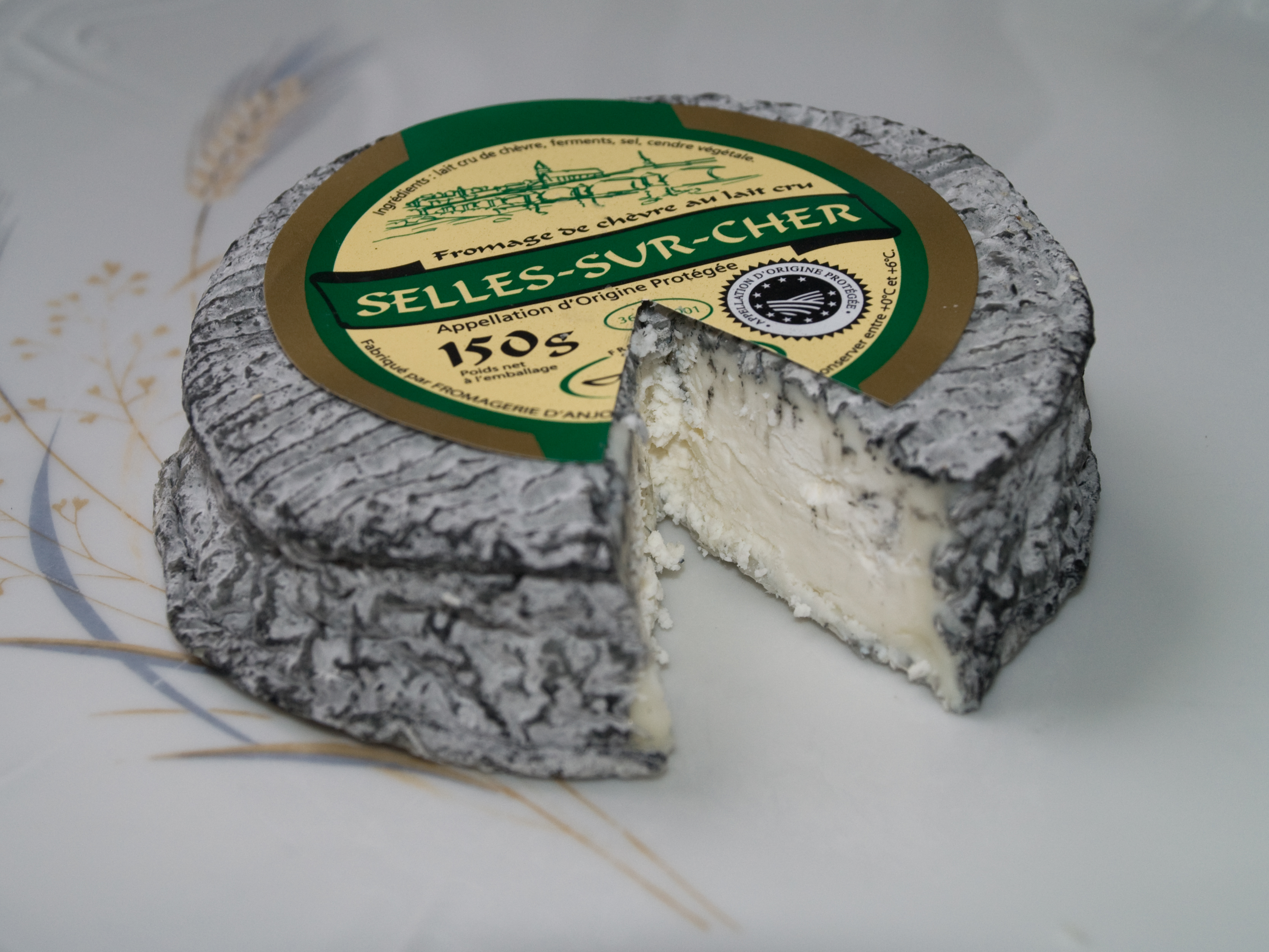
- Country of origin: France
- Region, town: Sologne
- Source of milk: Goats
- Pasteurised: No
- Texture: Soft cheese with natural mould rind
- Aging time: 10–30 days
- Certification: French AOC 1975
- Named after: Selles-sur-Cher

Selles-sur-Cher (also spelled selles-sur-cher in all lower case in French) is a French goat-milk cheese made in Centre-Val de Loire, France. Its name is derived from the commune of Selles-sur-Cher, Loir-et-Cher, where it was first made in the 19th century.

The cheese is sold in small cylindrical units, around 8 cm in diameter at the base (reduced to around 7 cm at the top) and 2–3 cm in height, and weighing around 150 g. The central pâte is typical of goat cheese, rigid and heavy at first but moist and softening as it melts in the mouth. Its taste is lightly salty with a persistent aftertaste. The exterior is dry with a grey-blue mould covering its surface, and has a musty odour. The mould is often eaten and has a considerably stronger flavour.

== Manufacture in France ==
Around 1.3 L (0.34 US gal) of unpasteurised milk are used to make a single 150 grams (5.3 oz) cheese. After the milk is soured using the ferment it is heated to around 20 °C (68 °F). A small amount of rennet is added and left for 24 hours. Unlike most other types of cheese, the curd is ladled directly into its mould which contains tiny holes for the whey to run off naturally. The cheese is then left in a cool ventilated room at 80% humidity (dry compared to a typical cellar at 90–100% humidity) for between 10 and 30 days, during which time it dries as the mould forms on its exterior. An initial coating of charcoal encourages the formation of its characteristic mould.

Selles-sur-Cher is made in fermier (36%), coopérative, and industriel production, with 747 tons produced in 2005. Although industriel production is now all year round, it is at its best between spring and autumn. The cheese was awarded AOC status in 1975. According to its AOC regulations, the cheese must be made within certain regions of the departments of Cher, Indre and Loir-et-Cher.

== See also ==
- List of goat milk cheeses
