= Wind power =

Electrical power generation from wind

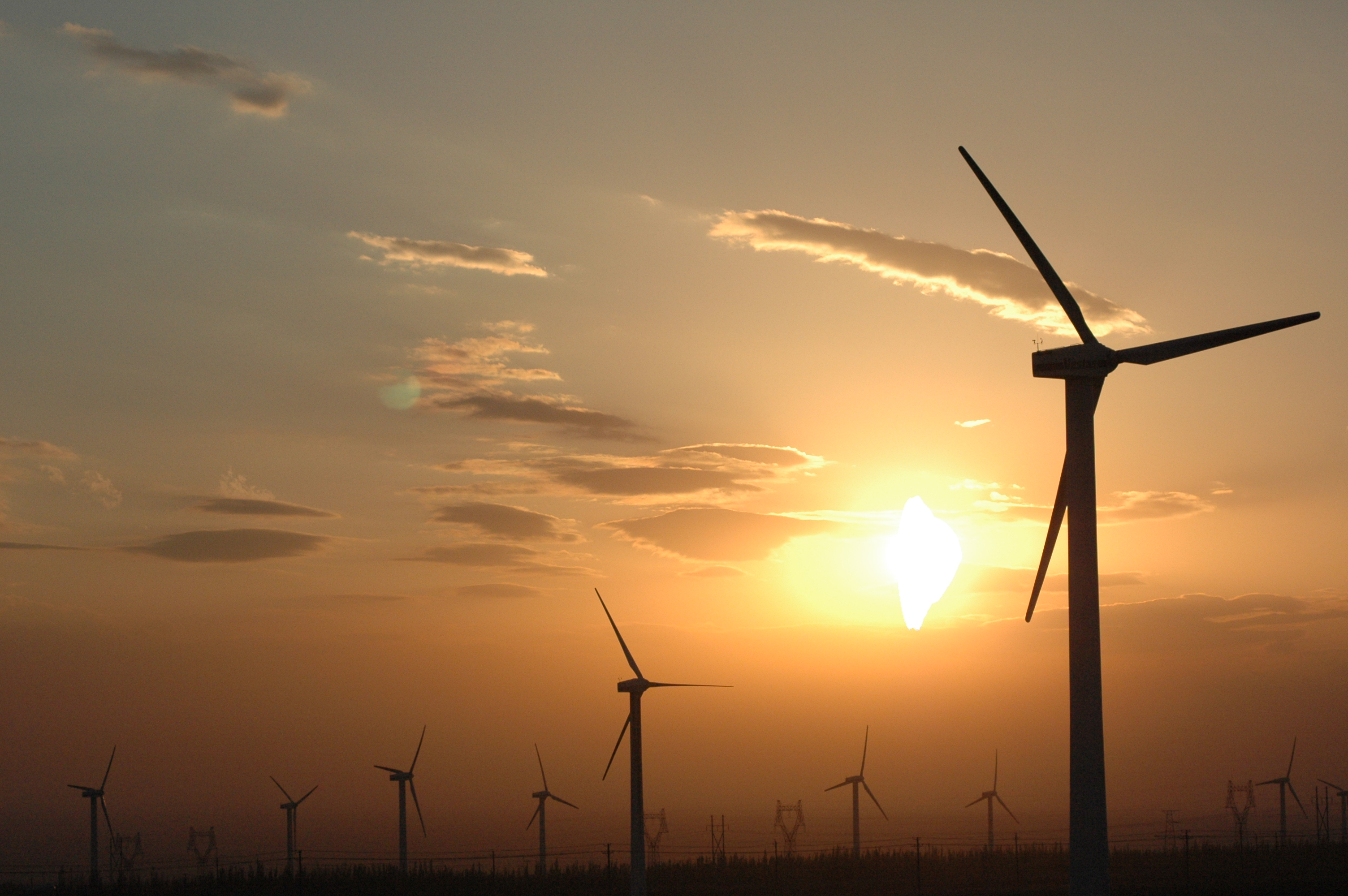
Wind farm in Xinjiang, China

World electricity production by source, 2000-2024

Wind power is the use of wind energy to generate useful work. Historically, wind power was used by sails, windmills and windpumps, but today it is mostly used to generate electricity. This article deals only with wind power for electricity generation. Today, wind power is generated almost completely using wind turbines, generally grouped into wind farms and connected to the electrical grid.

In 2025, wind supplied about 2,700 TWh of electricity, which was over 8% of world electricity. With about 100 GW added during 2021, mostly in China and the United States, global installed wind power capacity exceeded 800 GW. 30 countries generated more than a tenth of their electricity from wind power in 2024 and wind generation has nearly tripled since 2015. To help meet the Paris Agreement goals to limit climate change, analysts say it should expand much faster – by over 1% of electricity generation per year.

Wind power is a sustainable, renewable energy source, and has a much smaller impact on the environment than burning fossil fuels. Wind power is variable, so it needs energy storage or other dispatchable generation energy sources to attain a reliable supply of electricity. Land-based (onshore) wind farms have a greater visual impact on the landscape than most other power stations per energy produced. Wind farms sited offshore have less visual impact and have higher capacity factors, although they are generally more expensive. Offshore wind power currently has a share of about 10% of new installations.

Wind power is one of the lowest-cost electricity sources per unit of energy produced. In many locations, new onshore wind farms are cheaper than new coal or gas plants.

Regions in the higher northern and southern latitudes have the highest potential for wind power. In most regions, wind power generation is higher in nighttime, and in winter when solar power output is low. So combinations of wind and solar power are suitable in many countries.

== Wind energy resources ==
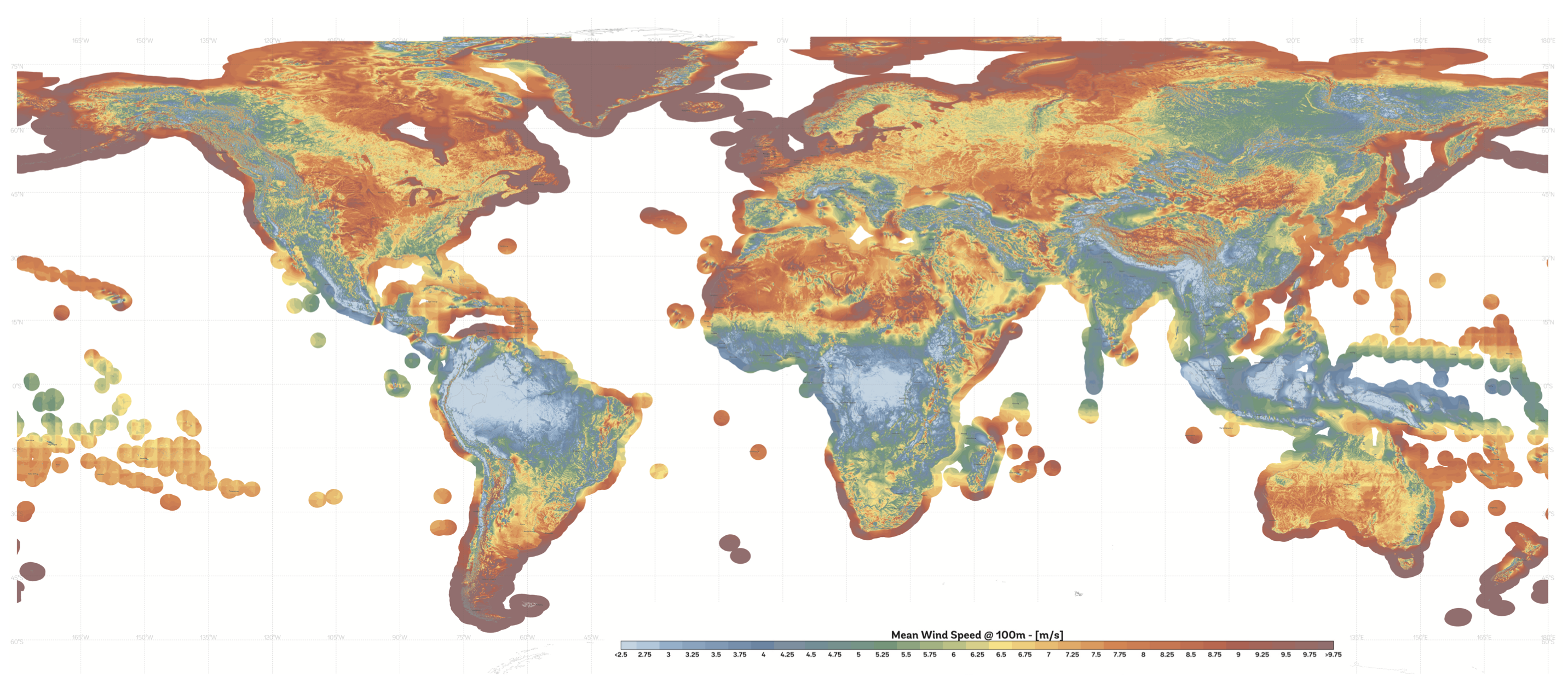
Global map of wind speed at 100 meters on land and around coasts.

Distribution of wind speed (red) and energy (blue) for all of 2002 at the Lee Ranch facility in Colorado. The histogram shows measured data, while the curve is the Rayleigh model distribution for the same average wind speed.

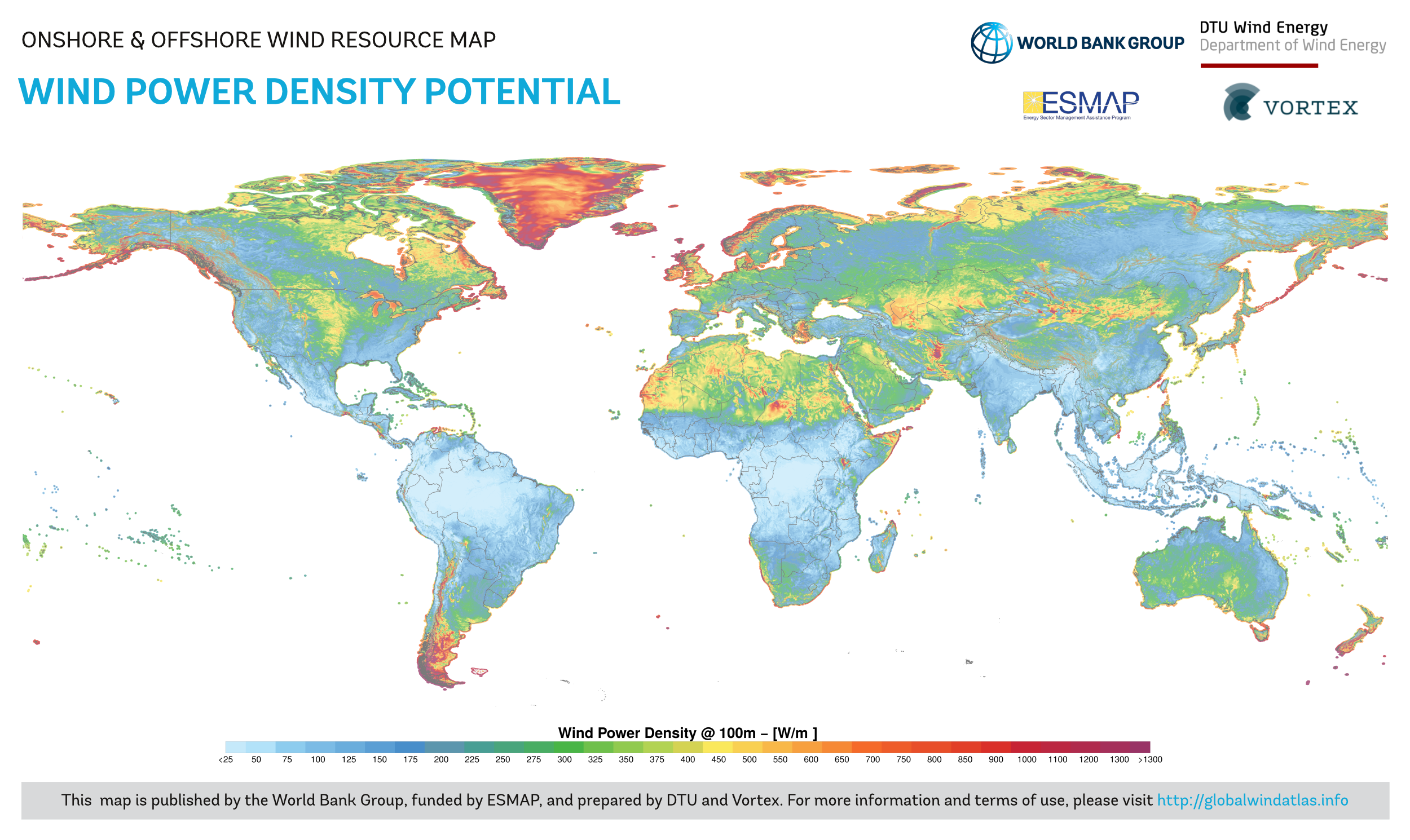
Global map of wind power density potential

Wind is air movement in the Earth's atmosphere. In a unit of time, such as 1 second, the volume of air that had passed an area $A$ is $Av$. If the air density is $\rho$, the flow rate of this volume of air is $\tfrac{M}{\Delta t}=\rho Av$, and the power transfer, or energy transfer per second is $P =\tfrac {1}{2}\tfrac{M}{\Delta t} v^{2}= \tfrac {1}{2}\rho A v^{3}$. Wind power is thus proportional to the third power of the wind speed; the available power increases eightfold when the wind speed doubles. Change of wind speed by a factor of 2.1544 increases the wind power by one order of magnitude (multiply by 10).

The global wind kinetic energy averaged approximately 1.50 MJ/m^{2} over the period from 1979 to 2010, 1.31 MJ/m^{2} in the Northern Hemisphere with 1.70 MJ/m^{2} in the Southern Hemisphere. The atmosphere acts as a thermal engine, absorbing heat at higher temperatures, releasing heat at lower temperatures. The process is responsible for the production of wind kinetic energy at a rate of 2.46 W/m^{2} thus sustaining the circulation of the atmosphere against friction.

Through wind resource assessment, it is possible to estimate wind power potential globally, by country or region, or for a specific site. The Global Wind Atlas provided by the Technical University of Denmark in partnership with the World Bank provides a global assessment of wind power potential. Unlike 'static' wind resource atlases which average estimates of wind speed and power density across multiple years, tools such as Renewables.ninja provide time-varying simulations of wind speed and power output from different wind turbine models at an hourly resolution. More detailed, site-specific assessments of wind resource potential can be obtained from specialist commercial providers, and many of the larger wind developers have in-house modeling capabilities.

The total amount of economically extractable power available from the wind is considerably more than present human power use from all sources. The strength of wind varies, and an average value for a given location does not alone indicate the amount of energy a wind turbine could produce there.

To assess prospective wind power sites, a probability distribution function is often fit to the observed wind speed data. Different locations will have different wind speed distributions. The Weibull model closely mirrors the actual distribution of hourly/ten-minute wind speeds at many locations. The Weibull factor is often close to 2 and therefore a Rayleigh distribution can be used as a less accurate, but simpler model.

== Wind farms ==
Large onshore wind farms
Wind farm	Capacity (MW)	Country	Refs
Gansu Wind Farm	7,965	China	
Muppandal Wind Farm	1,500	India	
Alta (Oak Creek-Mojave)	1,320	United States	
Jaisalmer Wind Park	1,064	India	

A wind farm is a group of wind turbines in the same location. A large wind farm may consist of several hundred individual wind turbines distributed over an extended area. The land between the turbines may be used for agricultural or other purposes. A wind farm may also be located offshore. Almost all large wind turbines have the same design — a horizontal axis wind turbine having an upwind rotor with 3 blades, attached to a nacelle on top of a tall tubular tower.

In a wind farm, individual turbines are interconnected with a medium voltage (often 34.5 kV) power collection system and communications network. In general, a distance of 7D (7 times the rotor diameter of the wind turbine) is set between each turbine in a fully developed wind farm. At a substation, this medium-voltage electric current is increased in voltage with a transformer for connection to the high voltage electric power transmission system.

=== Generator characteristics and stability ===
Most modern turbines use variable speed generators combined with either a partial or full-scale power converter between the turbine generator and the collector system, which generally have more desirable properties for grid interconnection and have low-voltage ride-through capabilities. Modern turbines use either doubly fed electric machines with partial-scale converters or squirrel-cage induction generators or synchronous generators (both permanently and electrically excited) with full-scale converters. Black start is possible and is being further developed for places (such as Iowa) which generate most of their electricity from wind.

Transmission system operators will supply a wind farm developer with a grid code to specify the requirements for interconnection to the transmission grid. This will include the power factor, the constancy of frequency, and the dynamic behaviour of the wind farm turbines during a system fault.

=== Offshore wind power ===
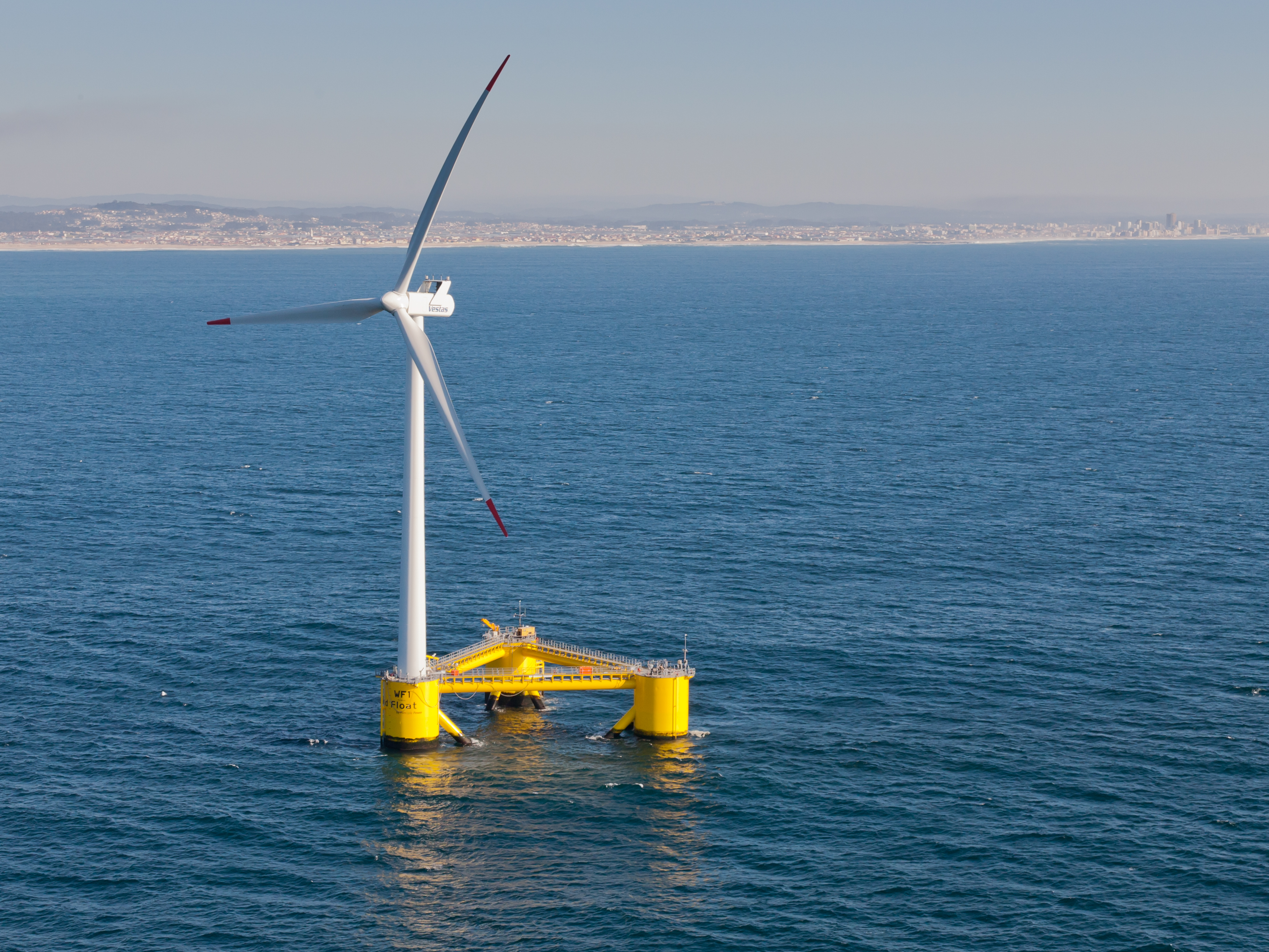
The world's second full-scale floating wind turbine (and first to be installed without the use of heavy-lift vessels), WindFloat, operating at rated capacity (2 MW) approximately 5 km offshore of Póvoa de Varzim, Portugal

Offshore windfarms, including floating windfarms, provide a small but growing fraction of total windfarm power generation. Such power generation capacity must grow substantially to help meet the IEA's Net Zero by 2050 pathway to combat climate change.

Offshore wind power is wind farms in large bodies of water, usually the sea. These installations can use the more frequent and powerful winds that are available in these locations and have less visual impact on the landscape than land-based projects. However, the construction and maintenance costs are considerably higher.

As of November 2021, the Hornsea Wind Farm in the United Kingdom is the largest offshore wind farm in the world at 1,218 MW.

=== Collection and transmission network ===
Near offshore wind farms may be connected by AC and far offshore by HVDC.

Wind power resources are not always located near areas with a high population density. As transmission lines become longer, the losses associated with power transmission increase, as modes of losses at lower lengths are exacerbated and new modes of losses are no longer negligible as the length is increased; making it harder to transport large loads over large distances.

When the transmission capacity does not meet the generation capacity, wind farms are forced to produce below their full potential or stop running altogether, in a process known as curtailment. While this leads to potential renewable generation left untapped, it prevents possible grid overload or risk to reliable service.

One of the major challenges to wind power grid integration in some countries is developing new transmission lines to carry power from wind farms, which are often in remote lowly populated areas due to availability of wind, to high load locations where population density is higher. Any existing transmission lines in remote locations may not have been designed for the transport of large amounts of energy. In particular geographic regions, peak wind speeds may not coincide with peak demand for electrical power, whether offshore or onshore. A possible future option may be to interconnect widely dispersed geographic areas with an HVDC super grid.

== Wind power capacity and production ==
In 2024, wind supplied over 2,494 TWh of electricity, which was 8.1% of world electricity.

=== Growth trends ===
Renewable energy sources, especially solar photovoltaic and wind power, are providing an increasing share of power capacity.

Wind energy generation by region

Wind generation by country

Number of countries with wind capacities in the gigawatt-scale by year
Growing number of wind gigawatt-markets
Above 1-GW mark
- 2022	(Croatia)	(Kazakhstan)
  2021	(Russia)	(Taiwan)	(Vietnam)
  2019	(Argentina)	(Thailand)	(Ukraine)
  2018	(Pakistan)	(Egypt)
  2017	(Norway)
  2016	(Chile)	(Uruguay)	(South Korea)
  2015	(South Africa)	(Finland)
  2012	(Mexico)	(Romania)
  2011	(Brazil)	(Belgium)
  2010	(Austria)	(Poland)	(Turkey)
  2009	(Greece)
  2008	(Republic of Ireland)	(Australia)	(Sweden)
  2006	(Canada)	(France)
  2005	(United Kingdom)	(China)	(Japan)	(Portugal)
  2004	(Netherlands)	(Italy)
  1999	(Spain)	(India)
  1997	(Denmark)
  1995	(Germany)
  1986	(United States)
Above 10-GW mark
- 2022	(Australia)
  2021	(Sweden)	(Turkey)
  2018	(Italy)
  2016	(Brazil)
  2015	(Canada)	(France)
  2013	(United Kingdom)
  2009	(India)
  2008	(China)
  2006	(United States)	(Spain)
  2002	(Germany)
Above 100-GW mark
- 2019	(United States)
  2014	(China)

To help meet the Paris Agreement's goals to limit climate change, analysts say it should expand much faster than it currently is – by over 1% of electricity generation per year. Expansion of wind power is being hindered by fossil fuel subsidies.

The actual amount of electric power that wind can generate is calculated by multiplying the nameplate capacity by the capacity factor, which varies according to equipment and location. Estimates of the capacity factors for wind installations are in the range of 35% to 44%.

=== Capacity factor ===
Since wind speed is not constant, a wind farm's annual energy production is never as much as the sum of the generator nameplate ratings multiplied by the total hours in a year. The ratio of actual productivity in a year to this theoretical maximum is called the capacity factor. Online data is available for some locations, and the capacity factor can be calculated from the yearly output.

=== Penetration ===
In 2025, growth in solar, wind and other low-carbon electric power exceeded the overall growth in demand for electricity, reducing reliance on fossil fuels and helping to curb greenhouse gas emissions.

Wind energy penetration is the fraction of energy produced by wind compared with the total generation. Wind power's share of worldwide electricity usage in 2021 was almost 7%, up from 3.5% in 2015.

There is no generally accepted maximum level of wind penetration. The limit for a particular grid will depend on the existing generating plants, pricing mechanisms, capacity for energy storage, demand management, and other factors. An interconnected electric power grid will already include reserve generating and transmission capacity to allow for equipment failures. This reserve capacity can also serve to compensate for the varying power generation produced by wind stations. Studies have indicated that 20% of the total annual electrical energy consumption may be incorporated with minimal difficulty. These studies have been for locations with geographically dispersed wind farms, some degree of dispatchable energy or hydropower with storage capacity, demand management, and interconnected to a large grid area enabling the export of electric power when needed. Electrical utilities continue to study the effects of large-scale penetration of wind generation on system stability.

A wind energy penetration figure can be specified for different duration of time but is often quoted annually. To generate almost all electricity from wind annually requires substantial interconnection to other systems, for example some wind power in Scotland is sent to the rest of the British grid. On a monthly, weekly, daily, or hourly basis—or less—wind might supply as much as or more than 100% of current use, with the rest stored, exported or curtailed. The seasonal industry might then take advantage of high wind and low usage times such as at night when wind output can exceed normal demand. Such industry might include the production of silicon, aluminum, steel, or natural gas, and hydrogen, and using future long-term storage to facilitate 100% energy from variable renewable energy. Homes and businesses can also be programmed to vary electricity demand, for example by remotely turning up water heater thermostats.

=== Variability ===
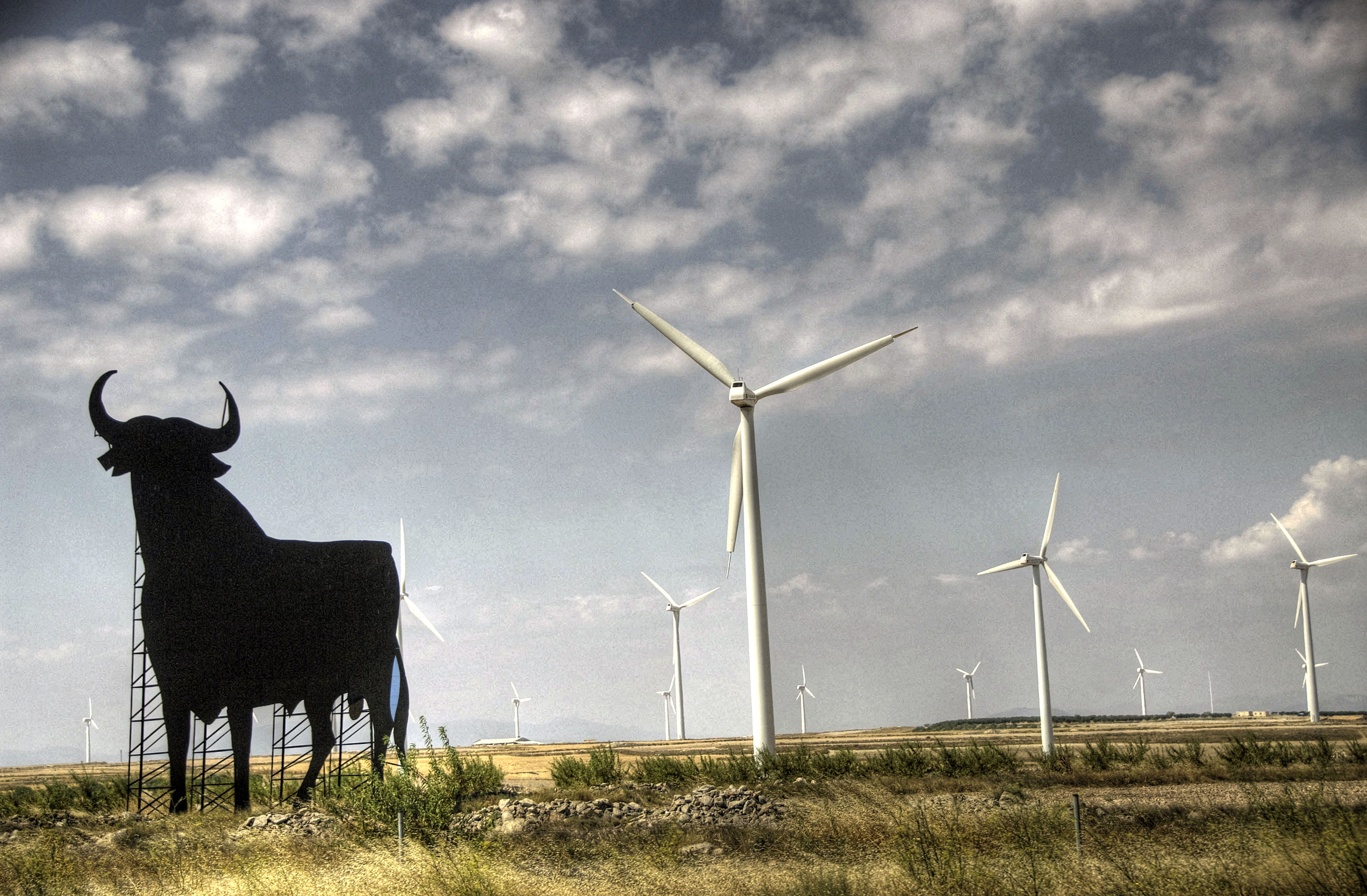
Wind turbines are typically installed in windy locations. In the image, wind power generators in Spain, near an Osborne bull.

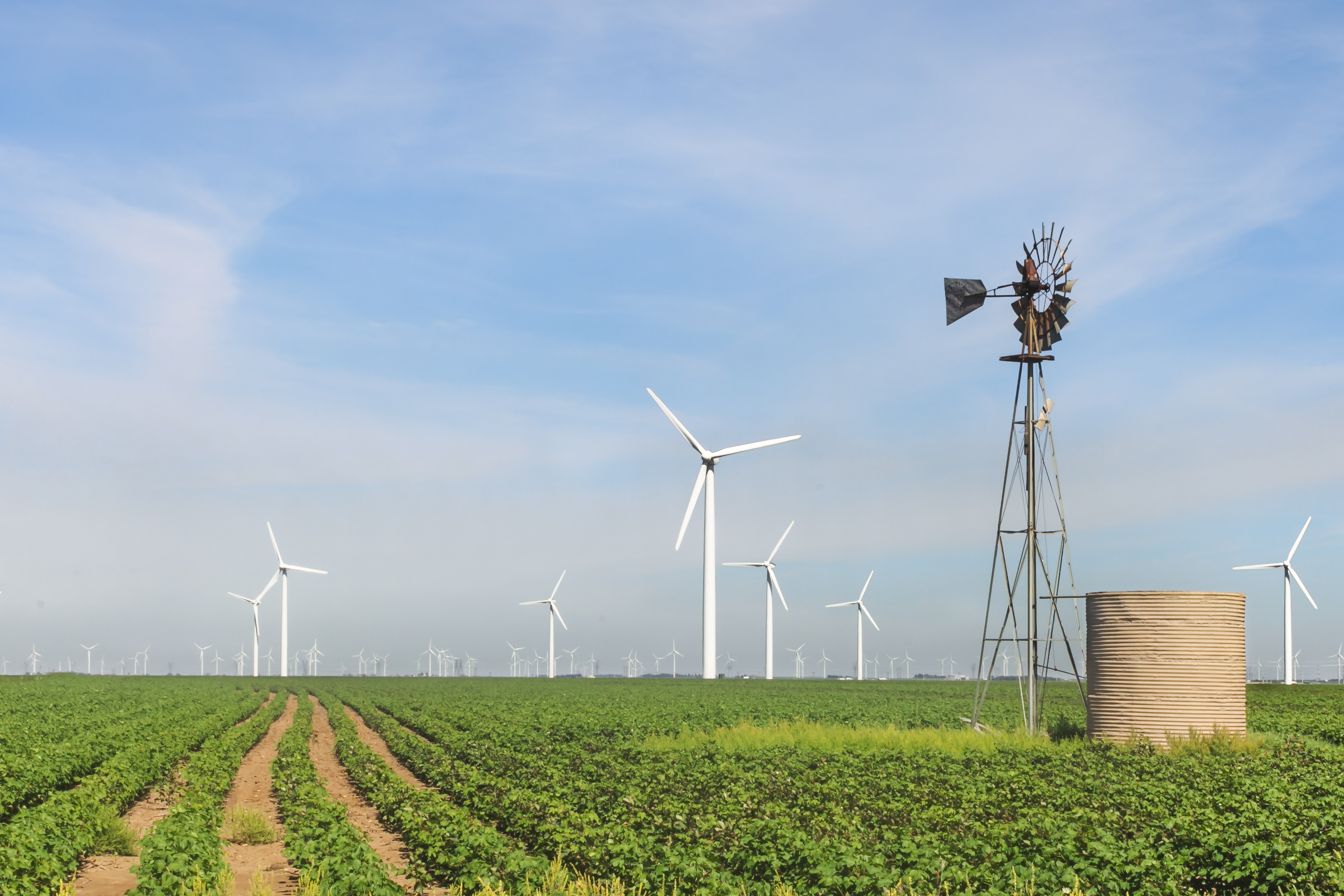
Roscoe Wind Farm: an onshore wind farm in West Texas near Roscoe

Wind power is variable, and during low wind periods, it may need to be replaced by other power sources. Transmission networks presently cope with outages of other generation plants and daily changes in electrical demand, but the variability of intermittent power sources such as wind power is more frequent than those of conventional power generation plants which, when scheduled to be operating, may be able to deliver their nameplate capacity around 95% of the time.

Electric power generated from wind power can be highly variable at several different timescales: hourly, daily, or seasonally. Annual variation also exists but is not as significant. Because instantaneous electrical generation and consumption must remain in balance to maintain grid stability, this variability can present substantial challenges to incorporating large amounts of wind power into a grid system. Intermittency and the non-dispatchable nature of wind energy production can raise costs for regulation, incremental operating reserve, and (at high penetration levels) could require an increase in the already existing energy demand management, load shedding, storage solutions, or system interconnection with HVDC cables.

Fluctuations in load and allowance for the failure of large fossil-fuel generating units require operating reserve capacity, which can be increased to compensate for the variability of wind generation.

Utility-scale batteries are often used to balance hourly and shorter timescale variation, but car batteries may gain ground from the mid-2020s. Wind power advocates argue that periods of low wind can be dealt with by simply restarting existing power stations that have been held in readiness, or interlinking with HVDC.

The combination of diversifying variable renewables by type and location, forecasting their variation, and integrating them with dispatchable renewables, flexible fueled generators, and demand response can create a power system that has the potential to meet power supply needs reliably. Integrating ever-higher levels of renewables is being demonstrated in the real world.

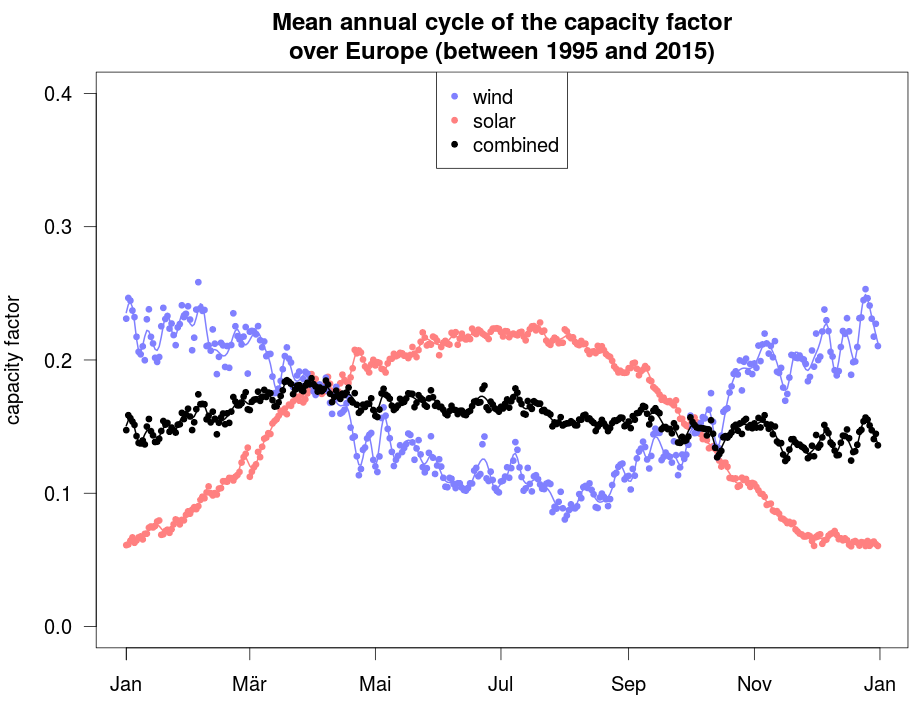
Seasonal cycle of capacity factors for wind and photovoltaics in Europe under idealized assumptions. The figure illustrates the balancing effects of wind and solar energy at the seasonal scale (Kaspar et al., 2019).

Solar power tends to be complementary to wind. On daily to weekly timescales, high-pressure areas tend to bring clear skies and low surface winds, whereas low-pressure areas tend to be windier and cloudier. On seasonal timescales, solar energy peaks in summer, whereas in many areas wind energy is lower in summer and higher in winter. (Note: California is an exception) Thus the seasonal variation of wind and solar power tend to cancel each other somewhat. Wind hybrid power systems are becoming more popular.

=== Predictability ===
For any particular generator, there is an 80% chance that wind output will change less than 10% in an hour and a 40% chance that it will change 10% or more in 5 hours.

In summer 2021, wind power in the United Kingdom fell due to the lowest winds in seventy years, In the future, smoothing peaks by producing green hydrogen may help when wind has a larger share of generation.

While the output from a single turbine can vary greatly and rapidly as local wind speeds vary, as more turbines are connected over larger and larger areas the average power output becomes less variable and more predictable. Weather forecasting permits the electric-power network to be readied for the predictable variations in production that occur.

It is thought that the most reliable low-carbon electricity systems will include a large share of wind power.

=== Energy storage ===
Energy from wind, sunlight or other renewable energy is converted to potential energy for storage in devices such as electric batteries or higher-elevation water reservoirs. The stored potential energy is later converted to electricity that is added to the power grid, even when the original energy source is not available.

Typically, conventional hydroelectricity complements wind power very well. When the wind is blowing strongly, nearby hydroelectric stations can temporarily hold back their water. When the wind drops they can, provided they have the generation capacity, rapidly increase production to compensate. This gives a very even overall power supply and virtually no loss of energy and uses no more water.

Alternatively, where a suitable head of water is not available, pumped-storage hydroelectricity or other forms of grid energy storage such as compressed air energy storage and thermal energy storage can store energy developed by high-wind periods and release it when needed. The type of storage needed depends on the wind penetration level – low penetration requires daily storage, and high penetration requires both short- and long-term storage – as long as a month or more. Stored energy increases the economic value of wind energy since it can be shifted to displace higher-cost generation during peak demand periods. The potential revenue from this arbitrage can offset the cost and losses of storage. Although pumped-storage power systems are only about 75% efficient and have high installation costs, their low running costs and ability to reduce the required electrical base-load can save both fuel and total electrical generation costs.

=== Energy payback ===
The energy needed to build a wind farm divided into the total output over its life, Energy Return on Energy Invested, of wind power varies, but averages about 20–25. Thus, the energy payback time is typically around a year.

== Economics ==
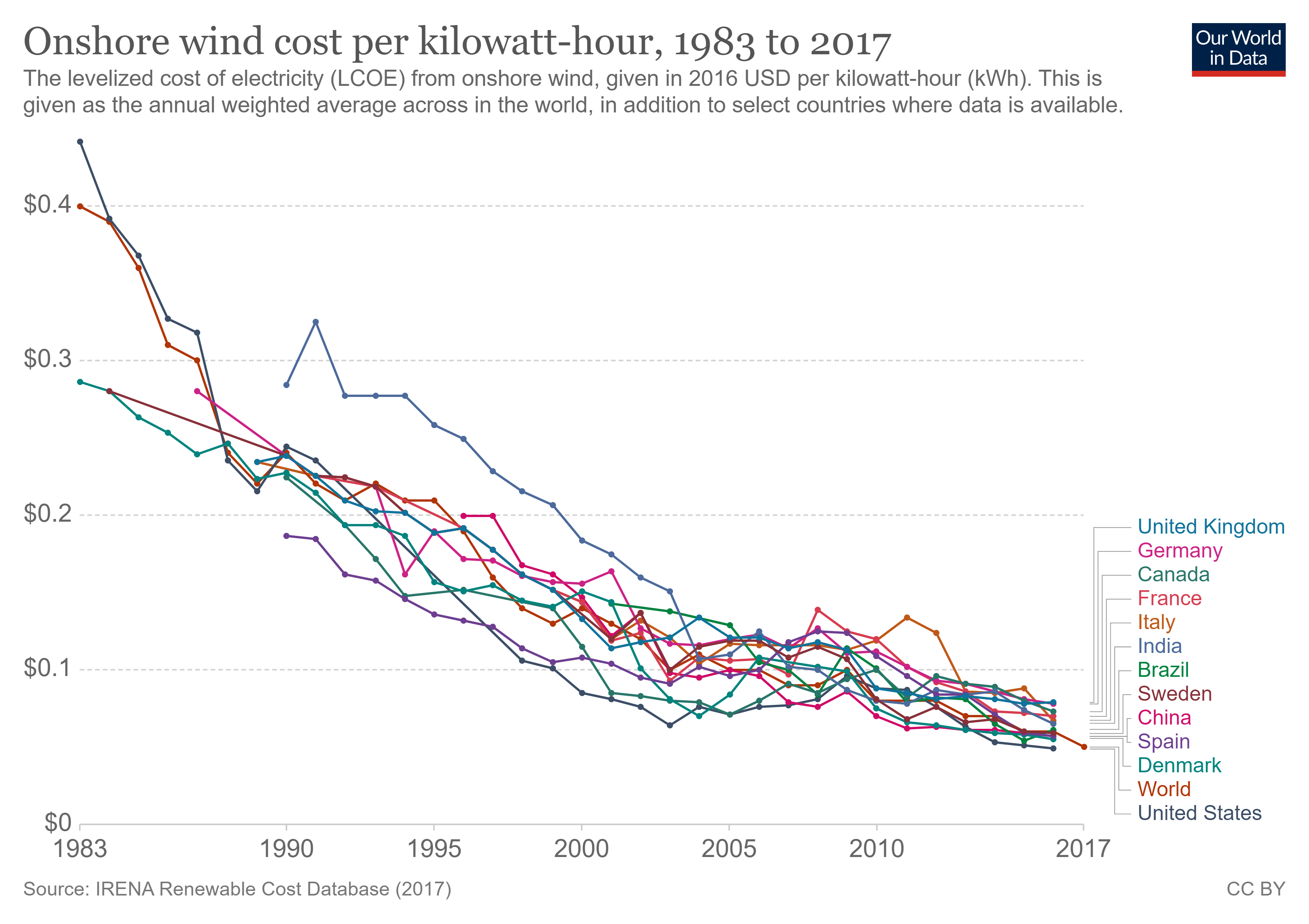
Onshore wind cost per kilowatt-hour between 1983 and 2017

Onshore wind is an inexpensive source of electric power, cheaper than coal plants and new gas plants. According to BusinessGreen, wind turbines reached grid parity (the point at which the cost of wind power matches traditional sources) in some areas of Europe in the mid-2000s, and in the US around the same time. Falling prices continue to drive the Levelized cost down and it has been suggested that it has reached general grid parity in Europe in 2010, and will reach the same point in the US around 2016 due to an expected reduction in capital costs of about 12%. In 2021, the CEO of Siemens Gamesa warned that increased demand for low-cost wind turbines combined with high input costs and high costs of steel result in increased pressure on the manufacturers and decreasing profit margins.

Northern Eurasia, Canada, some parts of the United States, and Patagonia in Argentina are the best areas for onshore wind: whereas in other parts of the world solar power, or a combination of wind and solar, tend to be cheaper.

=== Electric power cost and trends ===
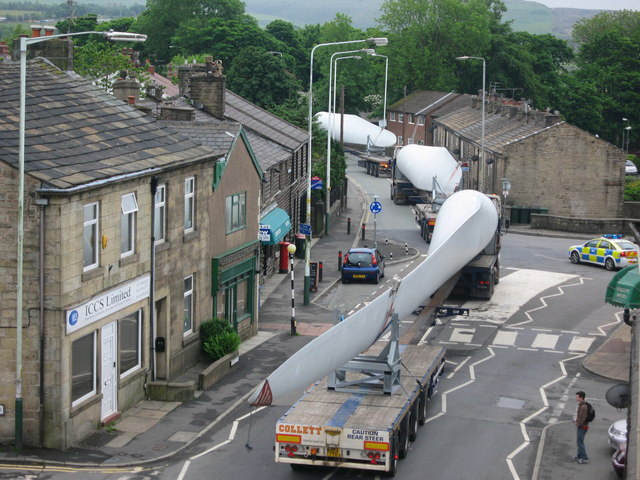
A turbine blade convoy passing through Edenfield in the U.K. (2008). Even longer 2-piece blades are now manufactured, and then assembled on-site to reduce difficulties in transportation.

Wind power is capital intensive but has no fuel costs. The price of wind power is therefore much more stable than the volatile prices of fossil fuel sources. However, the estimated average cost per unit of electric power must incorporate the cost of construction of the turbine and transmission facilities, borrowed funds, return to investors (including the cost of risk), estimated annual production, and other components, averaged over the projected useful life of the equipment, which may be more than 20 years. Energy cost estimates are highly dependent on these assumptions so published cost figures can differ substantially.

The presence of wind energy, even when subsidized, can reduce costs for consumers (€5 billion/yr in Germany) by reducing the marginal price and by minimizing the use of expensive peaking power plants.

The cost has decreased as wind turbine technology has improved. There are now longer and lighter wind turbine blades, improvements in turbine performance, and increased power generation efficiency. Also, wind project capital expenditure costs and maintenance costs have continued to decline.

In 2021, a Lazard study of unsubsidized electricity said that wind power levelized cost of electricity continues to fall but more slowly than before. The study estimated new wind-generated electricity cost from $26 to $50/MWh, compared to new gas power from $45 to $74/MWh. The median cost of fully deprecated existing coal power was $42/MWh, nuclear $29/MWh and gas $24/MWh. The study estimated offshore wind at around $83/MWh. Compound annual growth rate was 4% per year from 2016 to 2021, compared to 10% per year from 2009 to 2021.

=== The value of wind power ===
While the levelised costs of wind power may have reached that of traditional combustion based power technologies, the market value of the generated power is also lower due to the merit order effect, which implies that electricity market prices are lower in hours with substantial generation of variable renewable energy due to the low marginal costs of this technology. The effect has been identified in several European markets. For wind power plants exposed to electricity market pricing in markets with high penetration of variable renewable energy sources, profitability can be challenged.

=== Incentives and community benefits ===
Turbine prices have fallen significantly in recent years due to tougher competitive conditions such as the increased use of energy auctions, and the elimination of subsidies in many markets. As of 2021, subsidies are still often given to offshore wind. However, they are generally no longer necessary for onshore wind in countries with even a very low carbon price such as China, provided there are no competing fossil fuel subsidies.

Secondary market forces provide incentives for businesses to use wind-generated power, even if there is a premium price for the electricity. For example, socially responsible manufacturers pay utility companies a premium that goes to subsidize and build new wind power infrastructure. Companies use wind-generated power, and in return, they can claim that they are undertaking strong "green" efforts. Wind projects provide local taxes, or payments in place of taxes and strengthen the economy of rural communities by providing income to farmers with wind turbines on their land.

The wind energy sector can also produce jobs during the construction and operating phase. Jobs include the manufacturing of wind turbines and the construction process, which includes transporting, installing, and then maintaining the turbines.

== Small-scale wind power ==
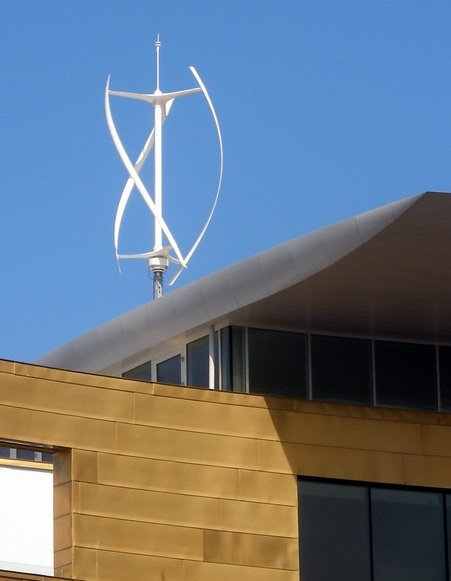
A small Quietrevolution QR5 Gorlov type vertical axis wind turbine on the roof of Bristol Beacon in Bristol, England. Measuring 3 m in diameter and 5 m high, it has a nameplate rating of 6.5 kW.

Small-scale wind power is the name given to wind generation systems with the capacity to produce up to 50 kW of electrical power. Isolated communities, that may otherwise rely on diesel generators, may use wind turbines as an alternative. Individuals may purchase these systems to reduce or eliminate their dependence on grid electric power for economic reasons, or to reduce their carbon footprint. Wind turbines have been used for household electric power generation in conjunction with battery storage over many decades in remote areas.

Examples of small-scale wind power projects in an urban setting can be found in New York City, where, since 2009, several building projects have capped their roofs with Gorlov-type helical wind turbines. Although the energy they generate is small compared to the buildings' overall consumption, they help to reinforce the building's 'green' credentials in ways that "showing people your high-tech boiler" cannot, with some of the projects also receiving the direct support of the New York State Energy Research and Development Authority.

Grid-connected domestic wind turbines may use grid energy storage, thus replacing purchased electric power with locally produced power when available. The surplus power produced by domestic microgenerators can, in some jurisdictions, be fed into the network and sold to the utility company, producing a retail credit for the microgenerators' owners to offset their energy costs.

Off-grid system users can either adapt to intermittent power or use batteries, photovoltaic, or diesel systems to supplement the wind turbine. Equipment such as parking meters, traffic warning signs, street lighting, or wireless Internet gateways may be powered by a small wind turbine, possibly combined with a photovoltaic system, that charges a small battery replacing the need for a connection to the power grid.

Airborne wind turbines, such as kites, can be used in places at risk of hurricanes, as they can be taken down in advance.

== Impact on environment and landscape ==
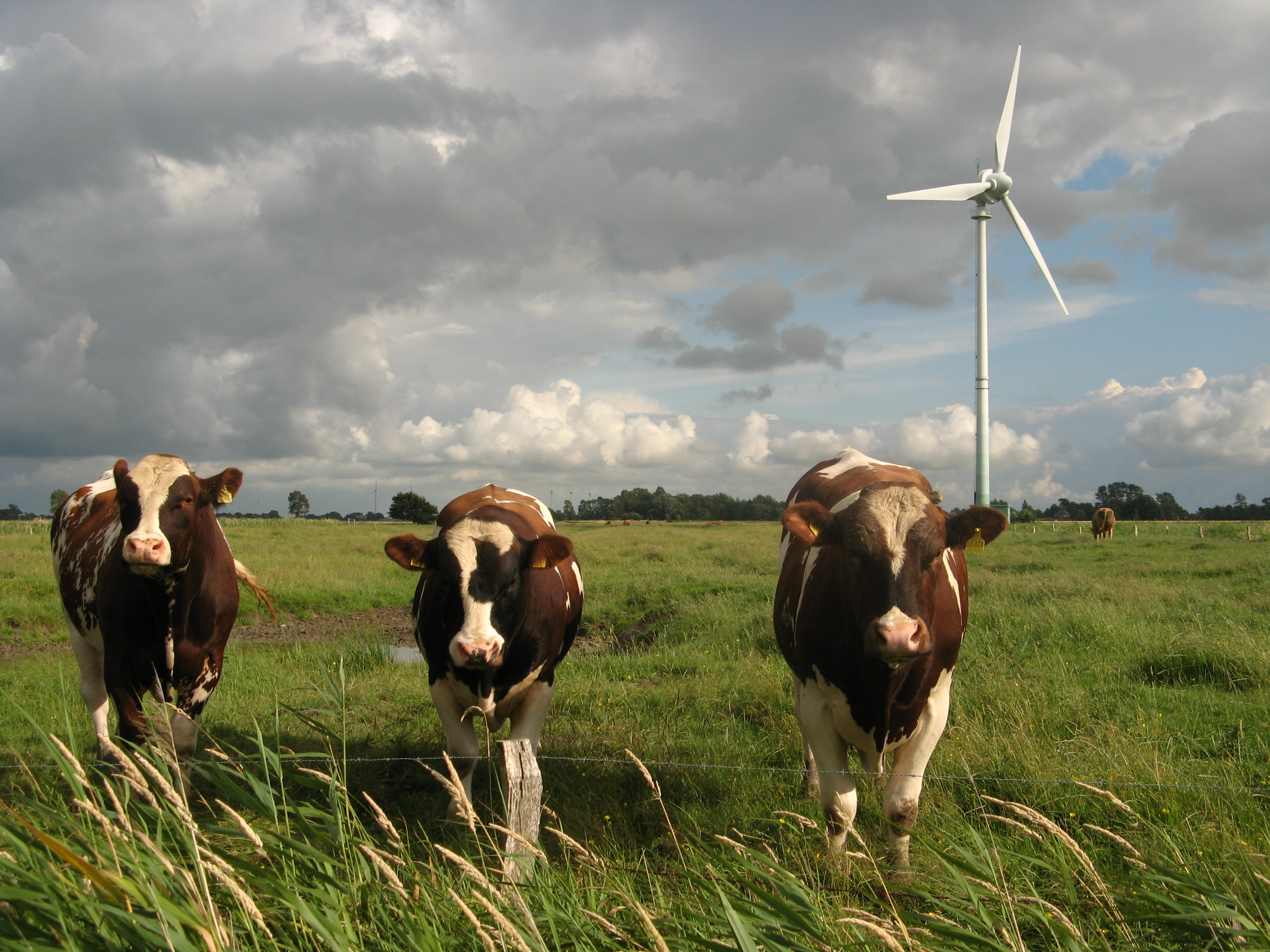
Livestock grazing near a wind turbine

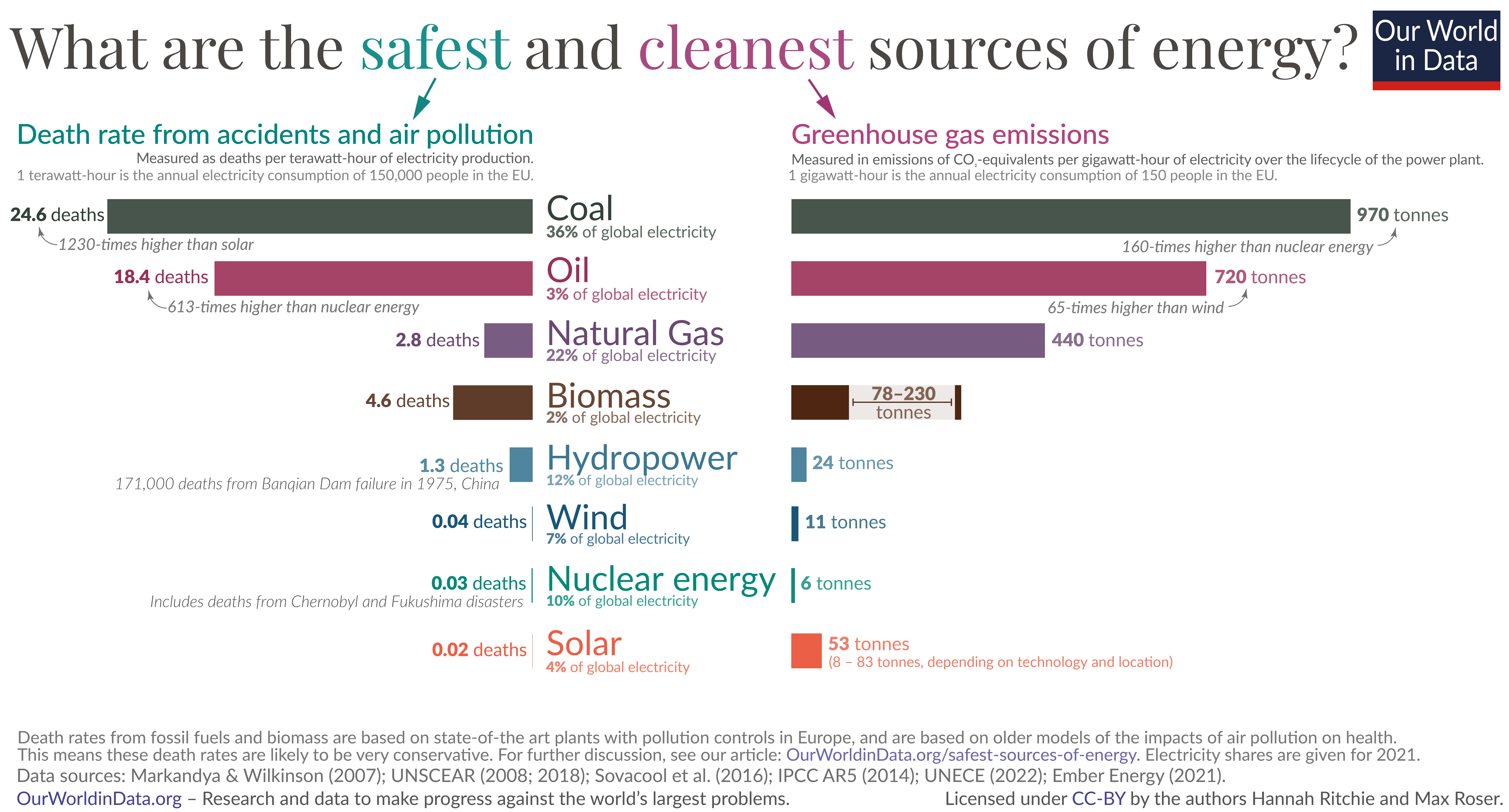
Per unit of energy, nuclear and wind power have minimal greenhouse emissions, and together with solar are the least deadly sources of energy.

The environmental impact of electricity generation from wind power is minor when compared to that of fossil fuel power. Wind power consumes no fuel, and emits no air pollution, unlike fossil fuels. Wind turbines have some of the lowest global warming potential per unit of electricity generated: far less greenhouse gas is emitted than for the average unit of electricity, so wind power helps limit climate change. Emissions from production of a turbine are recouped in less than a year of operation, as it replaces gas or coal power.

Onshore (on-land) wind farms can have a significant visual impact and impact on the landscape. Due to a very low surface power density and spacing requirements, wind farms typically need to be spread over more land than other power stations. Conflicts arise especially in scenic and culturally-important landscapes. Siting restrictions, such as setbacks, may be implemented to limit the impact. The land between the turbines and access roads can still be used for farming and grazing. Some wind farms are opposed for potentially spoiling protected scenic areas, archaeological landscapes and heritage sites.

Many wind turbine blades are made of fiberglass and some only had a lifetime of 10 to 20 years. Previously, there was no market for recycling these old blades, and they were commonly disposed of in landfills. Because blades are hollow, they take up a large volume compared to their mass. Since 2019, some landfill operators have begun requiring blades to be crushed before being landfilled. Blade end-of-life is complicated, and blades manufactured in the 2020s are more likely to be designed to be completely recyclable.

Wind turbines also generate noise. At a distance of 300 metres (980 ft) this may be around 45 dB, which is slightly louder than a refrigerator. At 1.5 km (1 mi) distance they become inaudible. Some people who live very close to wind turbines have reported negative health effects, but peer-reviewed research has generally not supported these claims. Pile-driving to construct non-floating wind farms is noisy underwater, but in operation offshore wind is much quieter than ships.

Habitat loss and fragmentation are the greatest potential impacts on wildlife of onshore wind farms, but the worldwide ecological impact is minimal. Thousands of birds and bats, including rare species, have been killed by wind turbine blades, though wind turbines are responsible for far fewer bird deaths than fossil-fueled power stations when climate change effects are included. The effects of wind turbines on birds can be mitigated with proper wildlife monitoring.

== Politics ==
=== Central government ===
Although wind turbines with fixed bases are a mature technology and new installations are generally no longer subsidized, floating wind turbines are a relatively new technology so some governments subsidize them, for example to use deeper waters.

Fossil fuel subsidies by some governments are slowing the growth of renewables.

Permitting of wind farms can take years and some governments are trying to speed up – the wind industry says this will help limit climate change and increase energy security – sometimes groups such as fishers resist this but governments say that rules protecting biodiversity will still be followed.

=== Public opinion ===
Acceptance of wind and solar facilities in one's community is stronger among U.S. Democrats (blue), while acceptance of nuclear power plants is stronger among U.S. Republicans (red).

Surveys of public attitudes across Europe and in many other countries show strong public support for wind power. Bakker et al. (2012) found in their study that residents who did not want turbines built near them suffered significantly more stress than those who "benefited economically from wind turbines".

Although wind power is a popular form of energy generation, onshore or near offshore wind farms are sometimes opposed for their impact on the landscape (especially scenic areas, heritage areas and archaeological landscapes), as well as noise, and impact on tourism.

In other cases, there is direct community ownership of wind farms. The hundreds of thousands of people who have become involved in Germany's small and medium-sized wind farms demonstrate such support there.

A 2010 Harris Poll found strong support for wind power in Germany, other European countries, and the United States.

Public support in the United States has decreased from 75% in 2020 to 62% in 2021, with the Democratic Party supporting the use of wind energy twice as much as the Republican Party. President Biden signed an executive order to begin building large scale wind farms.

In China, Shen et al. (2019) found that Chinese city-dwellers may be resistant to building wind turbines in urban areas, with a surprisingly high proportion of people citing an unfounded fear of radiation as driving their concerns. Also, the study finds that like their counterparts in OECD countries, urban Chinese respondents are sensitive to direct costs and wildlife externalities. Distributing relevant information about turbines to the public may alleviate resistance.

=== Community ===
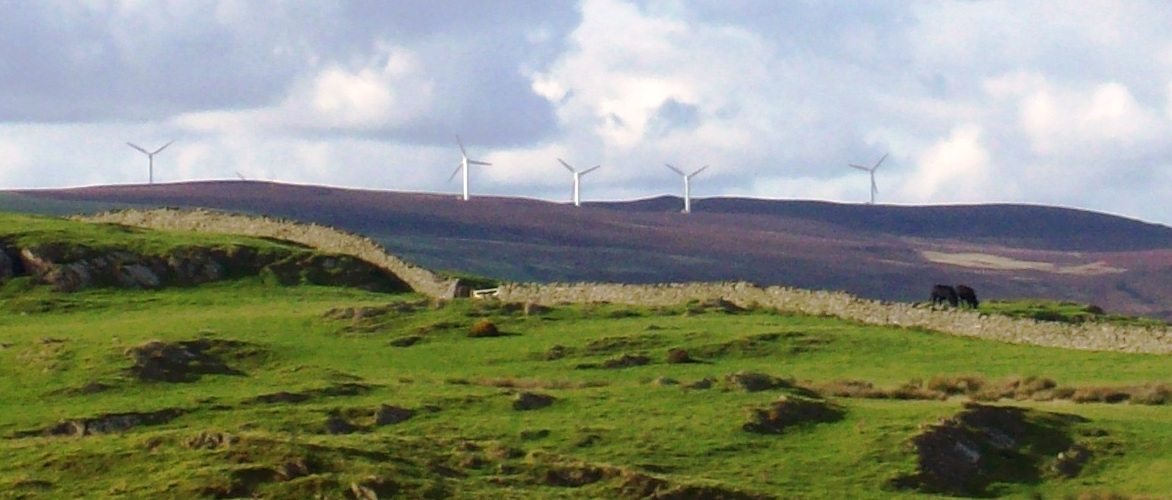
Wind turbines such as these, in Cumbria, England, have been opposed for a number of reasons, including aesthetics, by some sectors of the population.

Many wind power companies work with local communities to reduce environmental and other concerns associated with particular wind farms. In other cases there is direct community ownership of wind farm projects. Appropriate government consultation, planning and approval procedures also help to minimize environmental risks. Some may still object to wind farms but many say their concerns should be weighed against the need to address the threats posed by air pollution, climate change and the opinions of the broader community.

In the US, wind power projects are reported to boost local tax bases, helping to pay for schools, roads, and hospitals, and to revitalize the economies of rural communities by providing steady income to farmers and other landowners.

In the UK, both the National Trust and the Campaign to Protect Rural England have expressed concerns about the effects on the rural landscape caused by inappropriately sited wind turbines and wind farms.

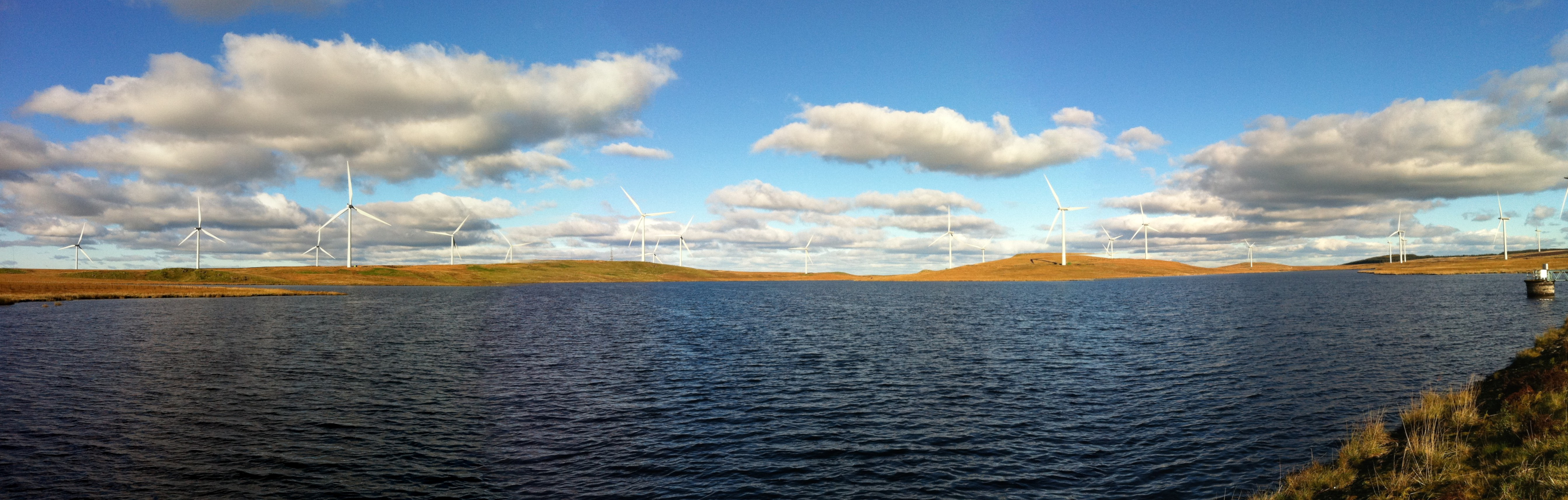
A panoramic view of the United Kingdom's Whitelee Wind Farm with Lochgoin Reservoir in the foreground.

Some wind farms have become tourist attractions. The Whitelee Wind Farm Visitor Centre has an exhibition room, a learning hub, a café with a viewing deck and also a shop. It is run by the Glasgow Science Centre.

In Denmark, a loss-of-value scheme gives people the right to claim compensation for loss of value of their property if it is caused by proximity to a wind turbine. The loss must be at least 1% of the property's value.

Despite this general support for the concept of wind power in the public at large, local opposition often exists and has delayed or aborted a number of projects. As well as concerns about the landscape, there are concerns that some installations can produce excessive sound and vibration levels leading to a decrease in property values. A study of 50,000 home sales near wind turbines found no statistical evidence that prices were affected.

While aesthetic issues are subjective and some find wind farms pleasant and optimistic, or symbols of energy independence and local prosperity, protest groups are often formed to attempt to block some wind power stations for various reasons.

Some opposition to wind farms is dismissed as NIMBYism, but research carried out in 2009 found that there is little evidence to support the belief that residents only object to wind farms because of a "Not in my Back Yard" attitude.

=== Geopolitics ===
Wind cannot be cut off unlike oil and gas so can contribute to energy security.

== Turbine design ==
Typical wind turbine components: 1. Foundation; 2. Connection to the electric grid; 3. Tower; 4. Access ladder; 5. Wind orientation control (yaw control); 6. Nacelle; 7. Generator; 8. Anemometer; 9. Electric or mechanical brake; 10. Gearbox; 11. Rotor blade; 12. Blade pitch control; 13. Rotor hub

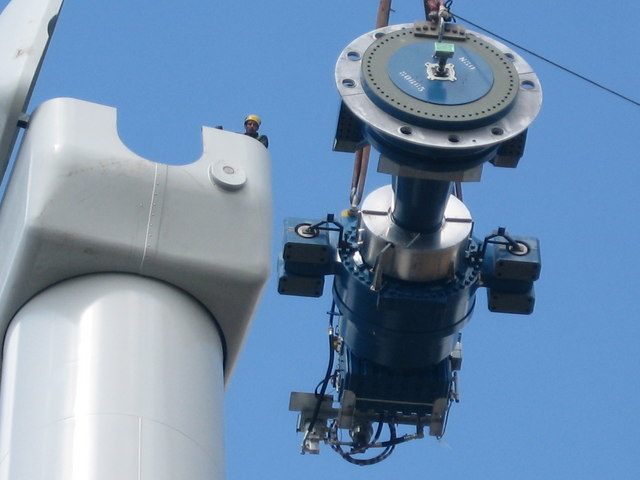
Typical components of a wind turbine (gearbox, rotor shaft and brake assembly) being lifted into position

Wind turbines are devices that convert the wind's kinetic energy into electrical power. The result of over a millennium of windmill development and modern engineering, today's wind turbines are manufactured in a wide range of horizontal axis and vertical axis types. The smallest turbines are used for applications such as battery charging for auxiliary power. Slightly larger turbines can be used for making small contributions to a domestic power supply while selling unused power back to the utility supplier via the electrical grid. Arrays of large turbines, known as wind farms, have become an increasingly important source of renewable energy and are used by many countries to reduce their reliance on fossil fuels.

Wind turbine design is the process of defining the form and specifications of a wind turbine to extract energy from the wind. A wind turbine installation consists of the necessary systems needed to capture the wind's energy, point the turbine into the wind, convert mechanical rotation into electrical power, and other systems to start, stop, and control the turbine.

In 1919, the German physicist Albert Betz showed that for a hypothetical ideal wind-energy extraction machine, the fundamental laws of conservation of mass and energy allowed no more than 16/27 (59%) of the kinetic energy of the wind to be captured. This Betz limit can be approached in modern turbine designs, which may reach 70 to 80% of the theoretical Betz limit.

The aerodynamics of a wind turbine are not straightforward. The airflow at the blades is not the same as the airflow far away from the turbine. The very nature of how energy is extracted from the air also causes air to be deflected by the turbine. This affects the objects or other turbines downstream, which is known as "wake effect". Also, the aerodynamics of a wind turbine at the rotor surface exhibit phenomena that are rarely seen in other aerodynamic fields. The shape and dimensions of the blades of the wind turbine are determined by the aerodynamic performance required to efficiently extract energy from the wind, and by the strength required to resist the forces on the blade.

In addition to the aerodynamic design of the blades, the design of a complete wind power system must also address the design of the installation's rotor hub, nacelle, tower structure, generator, controls, and foundation.

== History ==
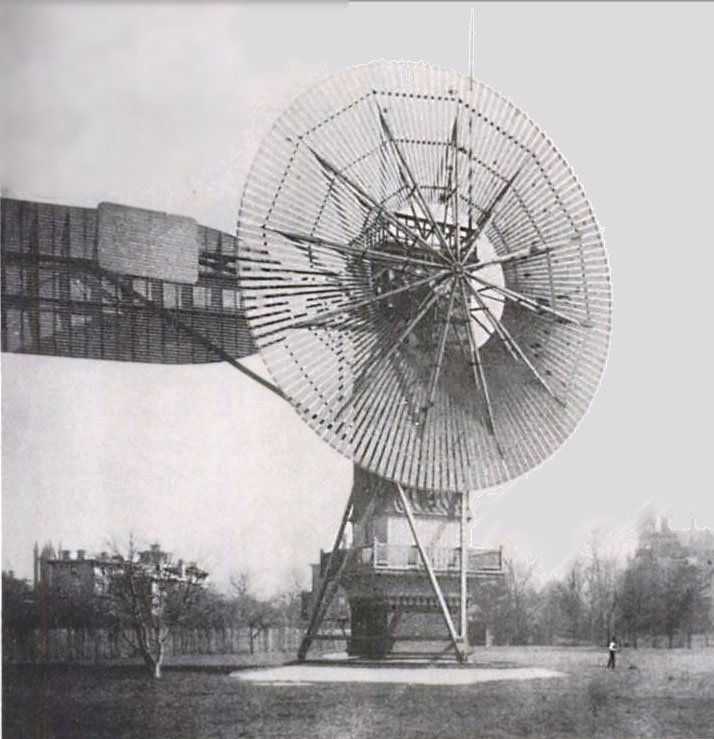
Charles F. Brush's wind turbine of 1888, used for generating electric power.

Wind power has been used as long as humans have put sails into the wind. Wind-powered machines used to grind grain and pump water, the windmill and wind pump, were developed in what is now Iran, Afghanistan, and Pakistan by the 9th century. Wind power was widely available and not confined to the banks of fast-flowing streams, or later, requiring sources of fuel. Wind-powered pumps drained the polders of the Netherlands, and in arid regions such as the American mid-west or the Australian outback, wind pumps provided water for livestock and steam engines.

The first wind turbine used for the production of electric power was built in Scotland in July 1887 by Prof James Blyth of Anderson's College, Glasgow (the precursor of Strathclyde University). Blyth's 10 metres (33 ft) high cloth-sailed wind turbine was installed in the garden of his holiday cottage at Marykirk in Kincardineshire, and was used to charge accumulators developed by the Frenchman Camille Alphonse Faure, to power the lighting in the cottage, thus making it the first house in the world to have its electric power supplied by wind power. Blyth offered the surplus electric power to the people of Marykirk for lighting the main street, however, they turned down the offer as they thought electric power was "the work of the devil". Although he later built a wind turbine to supply emergency power to the local Lunatic Asylum, Infirmary, and Dispensary of Montrose, the invention never really caught on as the technology was not considered to be economically viable.

Across the Atlantic, in Cleveland, Ohio, a larger and heavily engineered machine was designed and constructed in the winter of 1887–1888 by Charles F. Brush. This was built by his engineering company at his home and operated from 1886 until 1900. The Brush wind turbine had a rotor 17 metres (56 ft) in diameter and was mounted on an 18-metre (59ft) tall tower. Although large by today's standards, the machine was only rated at 12 kW. The connected dynamo was used either to charge a bank of batteries or to operate up to 100 incandescent light bulbs, three arc lamps, and various motors in Brush's laboratory. With the development of electric power, wind power found new applications in lighting buildings remote from centrally generated power. Throughout the 20th century parallel paths developed small wind stations suitable for farms or residences. From 1932 many isolated properties in Australia ran their lighting and electric fans from batteries, charged by a "Freelite" wind-driven generator, producing 100 watts of electrical power from as little wind speed as 10 miles per hour (16 km/h).

The 1973 oil crisis triggered the investigation in Denmark and the United States that led to larger utility-scale wind generators that could be connected to electric power grids for remote use of power. By 2008, the U.S. installed capacity had reached 25.4 gigawatts, and by 2012 the installed capacity was 60 gigawatts. Today, wind-powered generators operate in every size range, from tiny stations for battery charging at isolated residences, up to gigawatt-sized offshore wind farms that provide electric power to national electrical networks. The European Union is working to augment these prospects.

In 2023, the global wind power sector experienced significant growth, with 116.6 gigawatts (GW) of new capacity added to the power grid, representing a 50% increase over the amount added in 2022. This surge in capacity brought the total installed wind power capacity worldwide to 1,021 GW by the end of the year, marking a growth of 13% compared to the previous year.

== See also ==
- 100% renewable energy
- Global Wind Day
- Hydrogen economy
- List of countries by renewable electricity production
- List of renewable energy journals
- List of wind turbine manufacturers
- List of offshore wind farms
- Lists of wind farms
- Outline of wind energy
- Wind power by country
- Wind resource assessment
- Wind-powered vehicle
