= Turby wind turbine =

Brand of vertical-axis Darrieus wind turbine

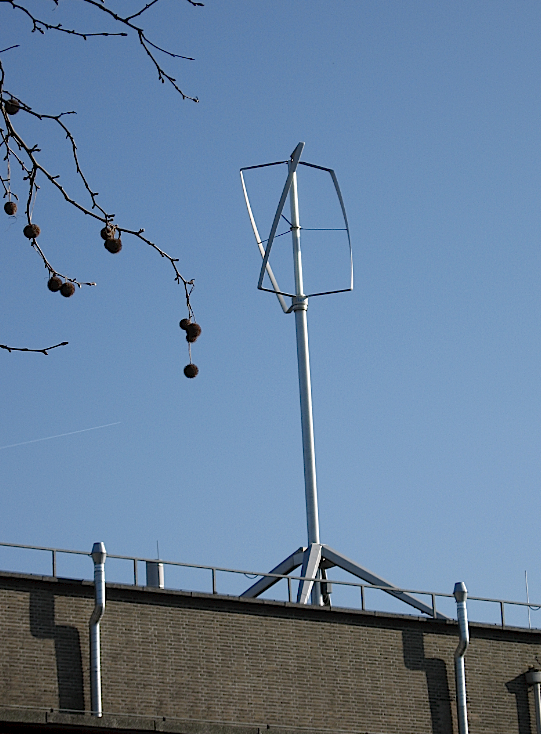
Turby prototype – TU Delft

The Turby is a brand of vertical-axis Darrieus wind turbine. The three vertical aerofoil blades have a helical twist of 60 degrees, similar to Gorlov's water turbines.

The turbine consists of three vertical symmetrical airfoil blades, each having a helical twist. The helical feature spreads the torque evenly over the entire revolution, thus preventing the destructive pulsations of the straight-bladed giromill (Darrieus turbine). The wind pushes each blade around on both the windward and leeward sides of the turbine. As with a Darrieus turbine, theoretically, there is no torque on a stationary turbine, due to symmetry of the turbine and of the blades. Starting is achieved by operating the generator as a motor. Torque is caused by a change in the apparent wind direction relative to the moving blades.

Another advantage of the helical twist is that the blades generate torque well from upward-slanting airflow. This is negligible in open country, but tall buildings and cliff faces generate a bow wave which directs airflow up and over them. Turbines mounted on high building rooftops or clifftops are exposed to significantly slanting flow, and the Turby can extract more useful energy from it than a propeller-type turbine can because horizontal axis (HAWT) types cannot change their pitch to face the wind directly.

The turbine measures 2.0 m (6 ft 7 in) in diameter by 2.9 m (9 ft 6 in) high (including generator), and weighs 136 kg (300 lb). It is specified to generate power in winds of between 4 and 14 m/s (8.9 and 31.3 mph; 7.8 and 27.2 kn), and can survive winds of 55 m/s (120 mph; 107 kn). The rated power at 14 m/s is 2.5 kW (3.4 hp). The AC output from the synchronous generator is rectified to DC, then inverted to AC at 230 V 50 Hz.

Core International developed the turbine in the Netherlands with research input from the Delft University of Technology.

== See also ==
- List of wind turbine manufacturers
- Distributed generation
- Net metering
- Betz' law
