= Water wall turbine =

Type of water turbine

The water wall turbine is a water turbine designed to utilize hydrostatic pressure differences for low head hydropower generation. It supports bidirectional inflow operation using radial blades that rotate around a horizontal axis. The water wall turbine is suitable for energy extraction from tidal and freshwater currents. For tidal power installations, the turbine operates in both directions as the tide ebbs and flows.

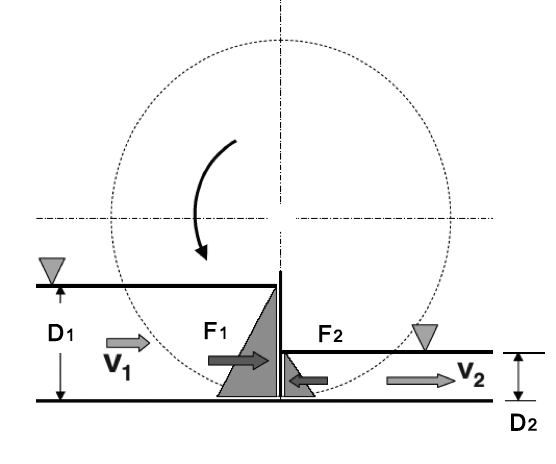
Water wall turbine hydrostatic pressure converter principle

== Development ==
Water wheels have been used throughout history in a wide variety of configurations. Most designs capture the water's kinetic energy, i.e. energy stored in the water's motion. Between 2004 and 2010, Lodewyk Botha and Marek Sredzki developed an inflow turbine that captures water's potential energy in addition to its kinetic energy. Principal patents for the technology were registered and published between 2005 and 2011.

The first full-scale water wall turbine project was completed in 2016 by Water Wall Turbine Inc. It features a 1MW power plant and a microgrid system. In this deployment, the water wall turbine features a straight flow-to-drive turbine mounted on a self-floating platform. The vessel is 28-meters long and 17-meters wide and weighs roughly 550 metric tons. The project serves Dent Island Lodge in BC, Canada. The deployment demonstrates the technology's ability to power remote communities.

In 2015, a study regarding the modeling and optimization of water wall turbines was conducted by the Canadian Hydraulics Centre of the National Research Council Canada. Independent studies regarding the efficiency and theory of a water wall turbine's operation have also been published.

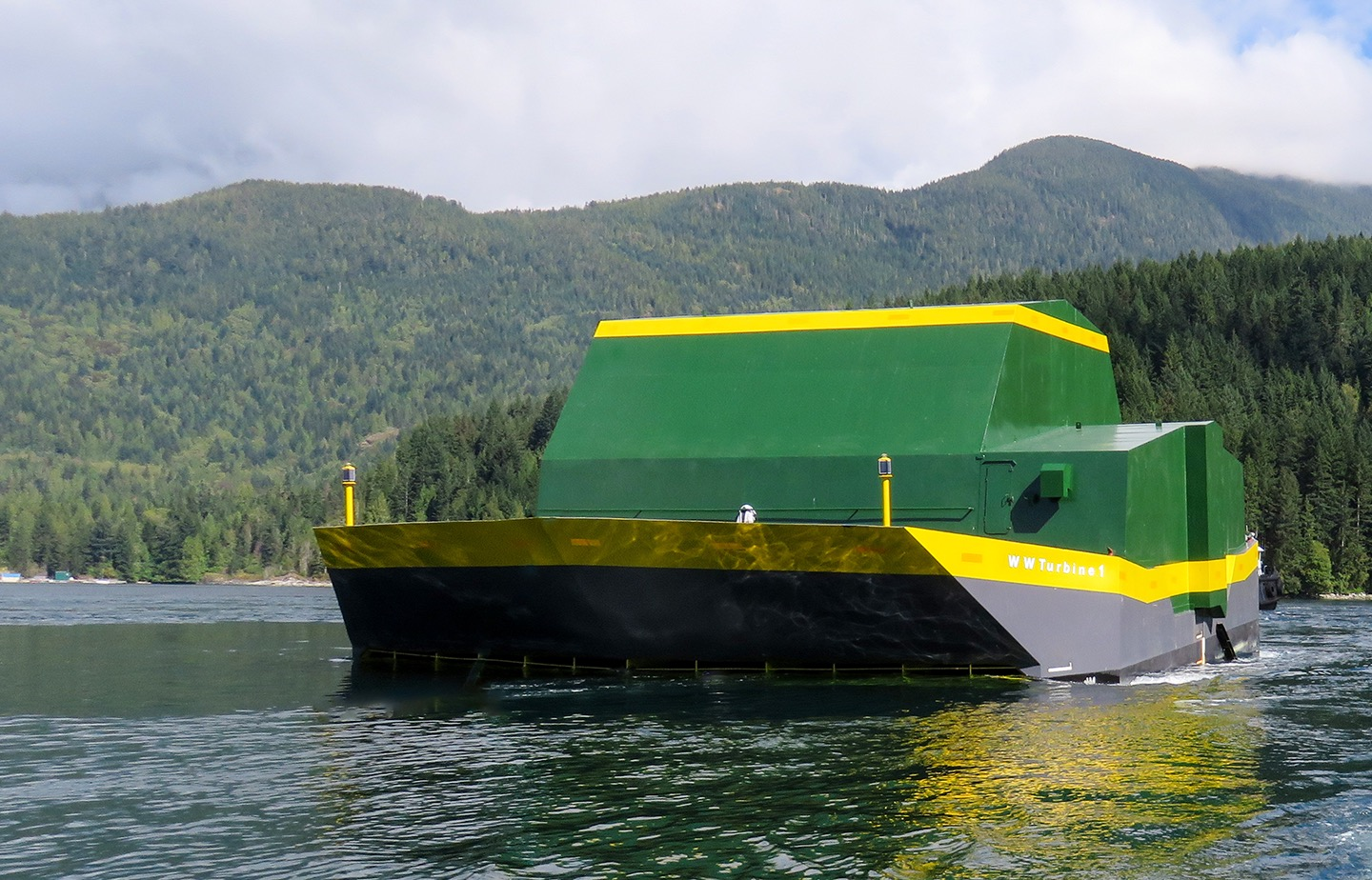
Water wall turbine self-floating power plant

== Theory of operation ==
The turbine's bidirectional rotation operates inline with the free current flow. Both potential and kinetic energy are harvested, providing higher energy extraction efficiency than a kinetic energy only approach. This is the principal difference between traditional water wheels and the water wall turbine design. It is this difference that allows a water wall turbine to operate effectively in low head environments. A water wall turbine's large rotating blade structure moves slower than the current, “blocking” the flow. In doing so, it causes head pressure to build up across the turbine, hydraulically propagated over the total vertical submerged blade. The turbine's catamaran-style floats use the Venturi effect to channel and accelerate the useable current. Studies in laboratory conditions have demonstrated that water wall turbines can achieve an efficiency of up to 90%.

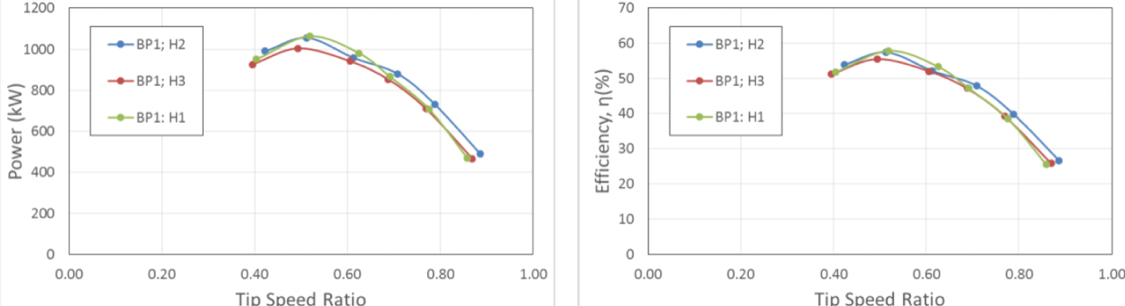
Water wall turbine power curve and efficiency

== Applications ==
A water wall turbine may be designed for a wide range of marine and freshwater installations including tidal zones, rivers, and canals, with its own flotation or on pylons. In contrast to other types of turbines such as Pelton, Francis, and Kaplan, it does not need a high water head or penstock. This makes it applicable in low head environments such as coastal passageways, where tidal currents are strongest.

Water wall turbines do not require barrages or catchment ponds and thus have minimal impact on the tidal effect in estuaries, making them suitable for sensitive environments. All of the electrical and mechanical components of a water wall turbine are in closed-containment above the waterline, mitigating the environmental impact to the waterway. The blades are arranged along the horizontal axis and turn slower than the speed of the current which results in a minimal risk to fish, sea mammals, or their habitats.

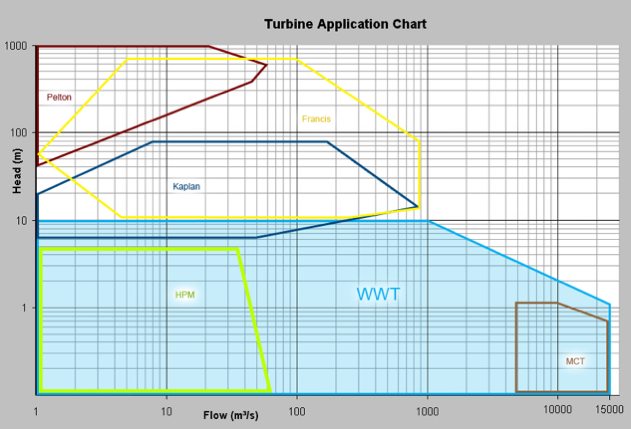
Water wall turbine range of operation

== See also ==
- Tidal stream generator
- Hydropower
- Hydroelectricity
- Francis turbine
- Gorlov helical turbine
- Kaplan turbine
- Pelton wheel
