= Quietrevolution wind turbine =

Brand of wind turbine

QR6 Wind Turbine, McDonald's Net Zero Carbon Restaurant, Market Drayton

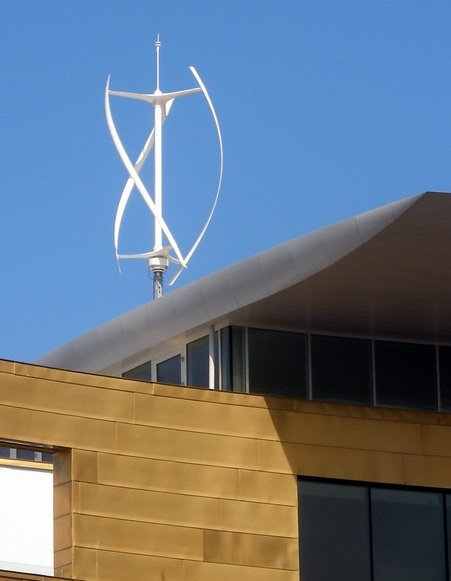
A qr5 turbine at Bristol Beacon, Bristol

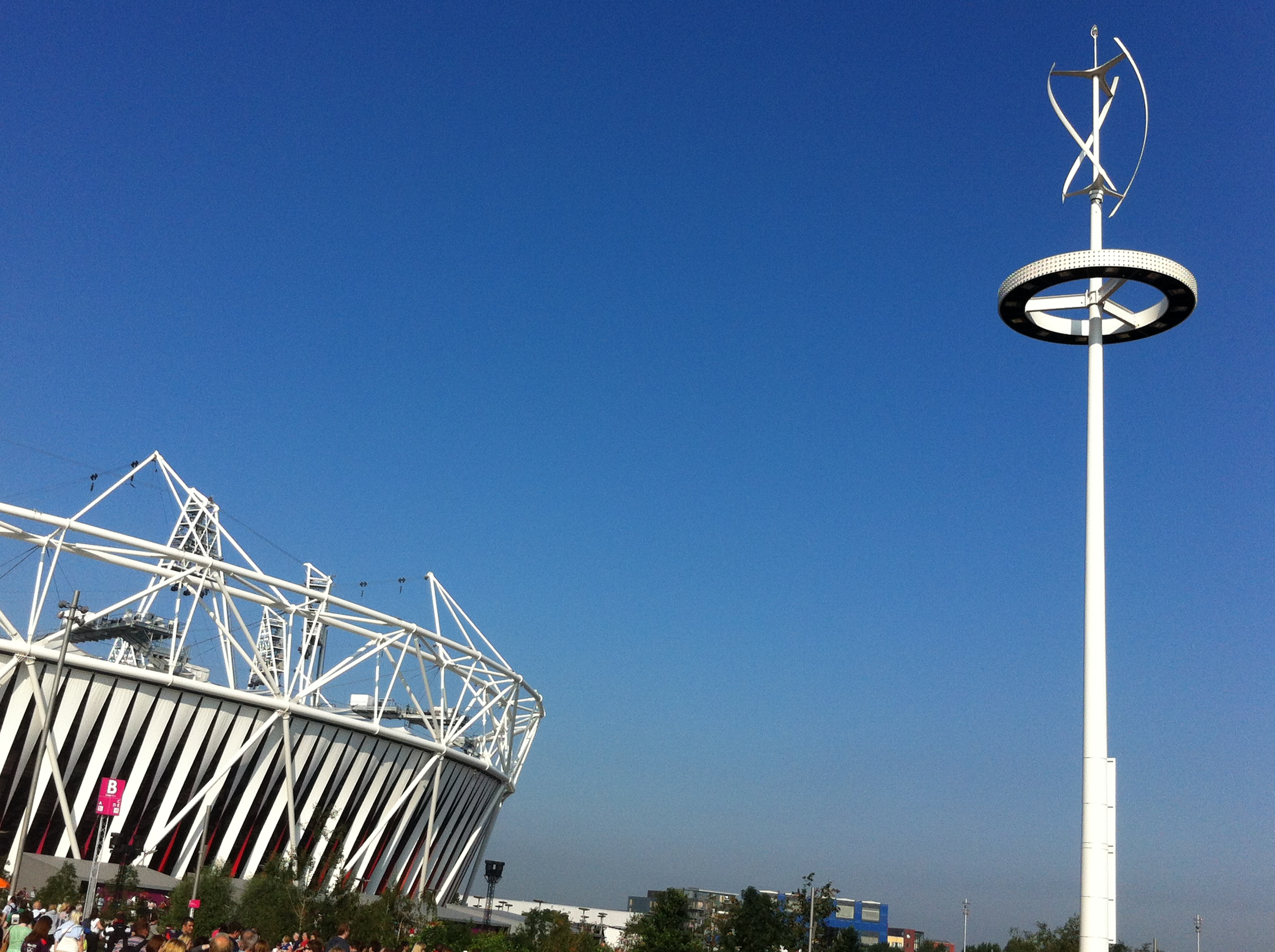
Quietrevolution wind turbine at the London Olympic Stadium

QR5 Wind Turbine, Cleveleys

Quietrevolution (often stylized with lower-case "q": quietrevolution) is a brand of vertical-axis wind turbines owned since 2014 by Darrieus Ltd previously VWT Power Ltd in the United Kingdom.

Quietrevolution's helical designs are related to the Gorlov turbine, which evolved from the Darrieus wind turbine. Quietrevolution's qr5 model won several awards, including Building magazine's 2006 Sustainable Innovation Award. However, the qr5 did not perform well enough to ensure the original company's success, and it went into administration in 2014. The company and its intellectual property were taken over later in 2014 by Darrieus Limited previously VWT Power Limited, which now offers an improved qr6 model. Two of which were erected at the UK's first Net Zero carbon restaurant in Market Drayton, Shropshire in 2021 which is a McDonald's drive thru. The QR6 was also installed at Dumfries and Galloway college in 2020 as well as several units in Sweden in 2024.

Both models consist of three vertical airfoil blades, each having a helical twist of 120 degrees. This feature spreads the torque evenly over the entire revolution, thus preventing the destructive pulsations of the straight-bladed giromill (Darrieus turbine). The wind pushes each blade around on both the windward and leeward sides of the turbine.

The qr5 turbine, rated for 6.5 kW, measures 3.1 metres (10 feet) in diameter and 5.5 metres (18 feet) high. The qr6 is similar: 3.1 m wide and 6 metres (20 feet) tall and is rated 7.5 kW.

Seven qr5 turbines were erected in 2012 at the Olympic Park in London in a failed attempt to generate on site 20% of the park's post-games energy requirements however there was insufficient wind resource. The turbines' usefulness was questioned: they were possibly net consumers of energy.

A public relations setback for the qr5 and original company was the poor performance of the turbine installed at Welsh government offices in Aberystwyth. The company blamed poor siting for the £48,000 turbine's generation of a monthly average of £5.28 worth of electricity (33 kWh) in 2012.

== See also ==
- List of wind turbine manufacturers
- Distributed generation
- Net metering
- Betz's law
