= Alexander Gorlov =

Russian-American scientist and inventor (1931–2016)

Alexander M. Gorlov
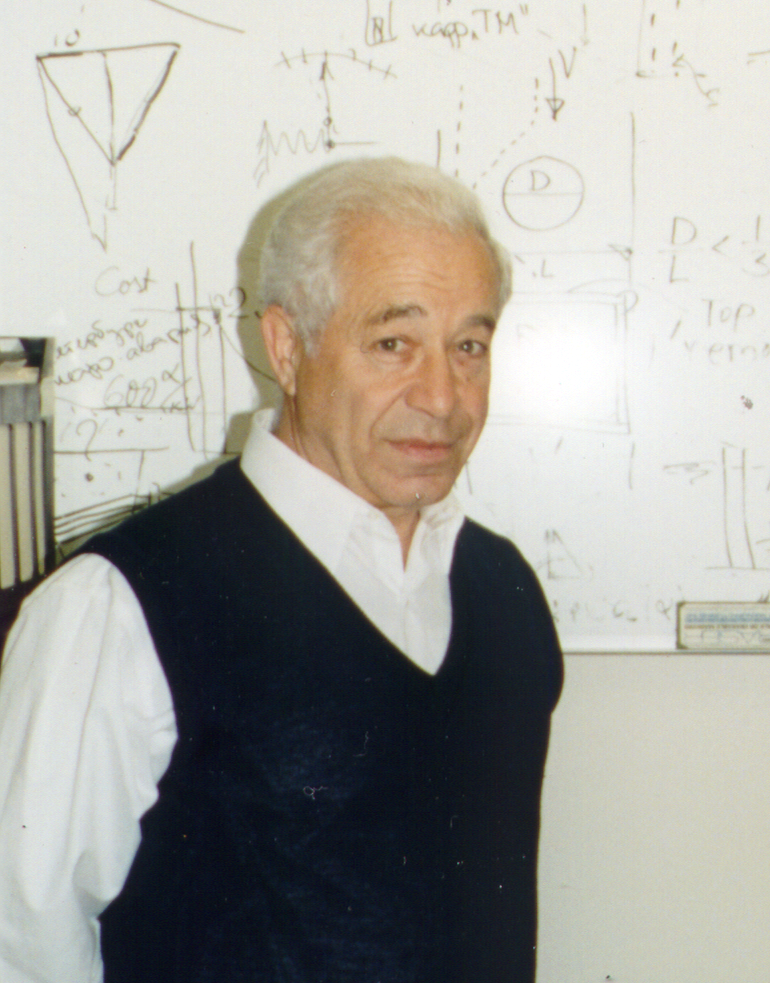
- Alexander M Gorlov, Boston, 2001
- Born: Alexandr Moiseevich Gorlov (Александр Моиcеевич Горлов); March 23, 1931; Moscow, Russian Federation (formerly USSR)
- Died: June 10, 2016 (aged 85); Boston, Massachusetts, United States
- Occupations: Inventor, scientist, professor

Alexander M. Gorlov (March 23, 1931 – June 10, 2016) was a Russian mechanical engineer who was Professor Emeritus and Director of Hydro-Pneumatic Power Laboratory at Northeastern University in Boston, Massachusetts.

== Early life ==
Alexander M. Gorlov was born into the family of a prosperous lawyer. His father was arrested and died in prison during Joseph Stalin's purges. His mother also spent a number of years in concentration camps in Russia, which forced young Alexander Gorlov to spend some of his childhood years in the orphanage in a remote Russian Urals area.

Gorlov received his Doctorate in engineering and had a successful scientific career in Moscow for a number of years during the relatively liberal period of the so-called Khrushchev Thaw. He was granted the Gold and two Bronze Medals for Achievements of the USSR National Economy. In 1975 because of his friendship with Alexander Solzhenitsyn, the Nobel Prize winner and outspoken critic of the communist system, Gorlov was forced to break with his Soviet life and emigrate, eventually establishing a new home in the United States.

== Career ==
Since 1976 Gorlov has been teaching Mechanical Engineering in the Northeastern University combining it with extensive research work in the area of harnessing renewable energy from water flows and wind. In the pursuit of his lifelong dream of creating inexpensive, environmentally friendly hydro-power, Gorlov has developed helical turbines for use in the river, tidal, and open ocean currents. His innovation has led to a series of patents for the Gorlov Helical Turbine which shows great promise for alleviating the worldwide crisis in energy use. This invention was named one of Popular Science's top 100 innovations of 2001. One of the other Gorlov's inventions - "Terrorist Truck-Bomb Protection System" - is certified by four US patents and is placed on the US Department of State list of certified equipment. That allows the system to be used for protection of vital Government installations such as nuclear power plants, military bases around the world, embassies, bridges and tunnels as well as other potential strategic targets from terrorist attacks.

Gorlov has over 100 technical publications, including books, and 25 US and international patents in such fields as renewable energy, structural analysis & design, theoretical mechanics and the design of bridges and tunnels.

== International engineering activity ==
- Bridges and tunnels (Russia, design and construction)
- Hydro power plant on Aswan Dam Project in River Nile (Egypt)
- Hydro power plants on rivers Khram, Langanury (Georgia) and Lake Sevan (Armenia)
- Implementation of helical turbine for extracting tidal energy in Uldolmok Strait (Korea) and Chacao Channel Chile

== Awards ==
- 2001, Thomas Edison Award by ASME for invention of the helical turbine.
- 2011, Nominated for the European Inventor Award for invention of the helical turbine.

== Personal ==
Professor Alexander M. Gorlov was a resident of Brookline and Falmouth (both in Massachusetts, USA), where he lived with his wife Ella who is a local historian.

== Patents ==
- A. M. Gorlov, Apparatus for harnessing tidal power, United States Patent 4,103,490, Aug 1, 1978.
- A. M. Gorlov, High volume tidal or current flow harnessing system, United States Patent 4,464,080, Aug 7, 1984.
- A. M. Gorlov, Terrorist vehicle arresting system United States Patent 4,759,655, July 26, 1988.
- A. M. Gorlov, Friction reduction for terrorist vehicle arresting system, United States Patent 5,026,203, June 25, 1991.
- A. M. Gorlov, Water gate array for current flow or tidal movement pneumatic harnessing system, United States Patent 5,074,710, Dec 24, 1991.
- A. M. Gorlov, Shutter for hydro-pneumatic current flow harnessing system, United States Patent 5,222,833, June 29, 1993.
- A. M. Gorlov, Unidirectional helical reaction turbine operable under reversible fluid flow for power systems, United States Patent 5,451,137, Sept. 19, 1995.
- B. L. Istorik, I. B. Chpolianski, A. M. Gorlov, Unidirecional reaction turbine operable under reversible fluid from flow, United States Patent 5,451,138, Sept 19, 1995.
- A. M. Gorlov, Helical turbine assembly operable under multidirectional fluid flow for power and propulsion systems, United States Patent 5,642,984, July 1, 1997.
- A. M. Gorlov, Helical turbine assembly operable under multidirectional gas and water flow, United States Patent 6,155,892, Dec 5, 2000.
- A. M. Gorlov, Method for maintaining flotation using a helical turbine assembly, United States Patent 6,253,700, July 3, 2001.
- A. M. Gorlov, System for providing wind propulsion of a marine vessel using a helical turbine assembly, United States Patent 6,293,835, Sept 25, 2001.

== Articles ==
- — (1979). "The Propagation of Plastic Zones Around the Tip of a Crack in a Circular Torsional Shaft". Journal of Applied Mechanics. 46 (2): 458–459. Bibcode:1979JAM....46..458G. doi:10.1115/1.3424572.
- — (1984). "Disaster of the 1-95 Mianus River bridge. Where could lateral vibration come from?". Journal of Applied Mechanics. 51 (3): 694–696. Bibcode:1984JAM....51..694G. doi:10.1115/1.3167697.
- — (1992). "A new opportunity for hydro: Using air turbines for generating electricity, Hydro Review". 11 (5).
- — (1995). "The helical turbine: A new idea for low-head hydro". Hydro Review. 14 (5).
- — (1998). "Helical turbines for the Gulf Stream: Conceptual approach to design of a large-scale floating power farm". Marine Technology. 35 (3): 175–182.
- — (2009). "Tidal energy" (PDF). In Steele, J. H.; Thorpe, S. A.; Turekian, K. K. (eds.). Elements of Physical Oceanography: A derivative of the Encyclopedia of Ocean Sciences. Academic Press. pp. 103–109.
- — (1998). "Turbines with a twist". In Kitzinger, U.; Frankel, E. G. (eds.). Macro-Engineering and the Earth: World Projects for the Year 2000 and Beyond. Chichester: Horwood Publishing. pp. 1–36.
- —; Gorban, A. N.; Silantyev, V. M. (2001). "Limits of the Turbine Efficiency for Free Fluid Flow". Journal of Energy Resources Technology. 123 (4): 311–317. doi:10.1115/1.1414137.
- — (2002). "The Helical Turbine and Its Applications for Hydropower Without Dams". ASME Conf. Proc. pp. 257–264. doi:10.1115/IMECE2002-33193.
- — (2004). "Harnessing Power from Ocean Currents and Tides". Sea Technol. 45 (7): 40–43. Archived from the original on 2012-08-29.
