= Wind-turbine aerodynamics =

Physical property

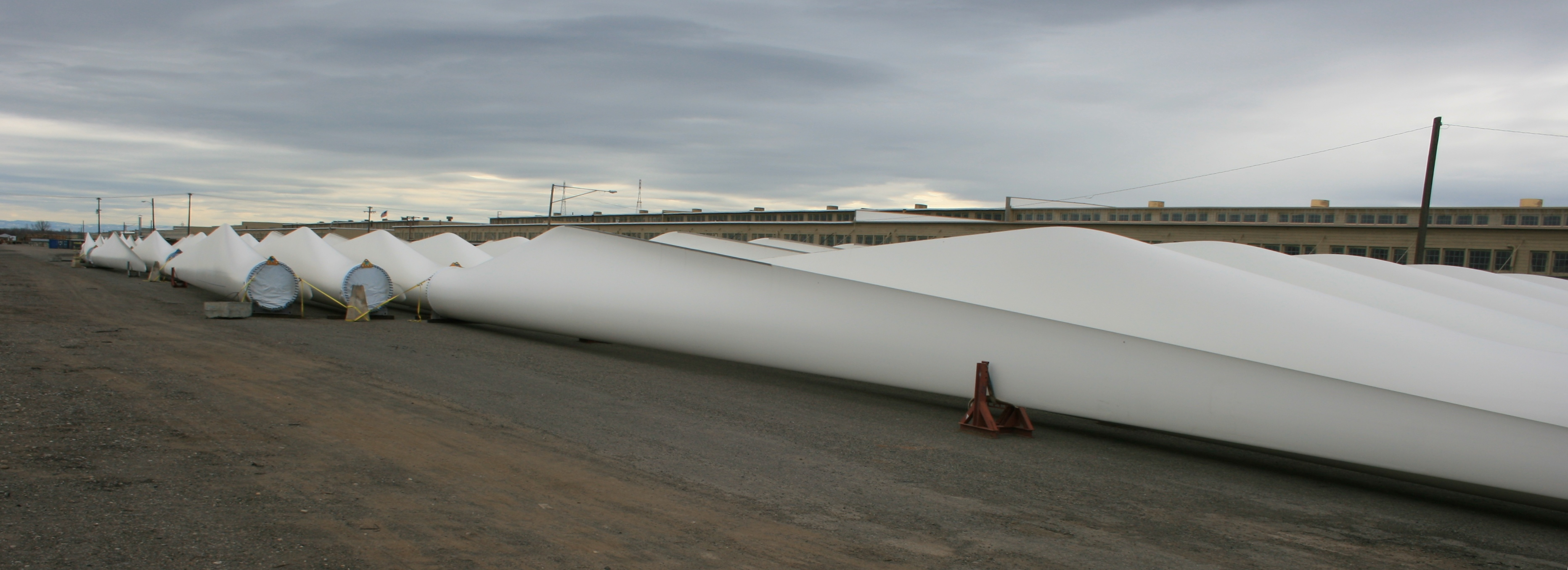
Wind-turbine blades in laydown yard awaiting installation.

The primary application of wind turbines is to generate energy using the wind. Hence, the aerodynamics is a very important aspect of wind turbines. Like most machines, wind turbines come in many different types, all of them based on different energy extraction concepts.

Though the details of the aerodynamics depend very much on the topology, some fundamental concepts apply to all turbines. Every topology has a maximum power for a given flow, and some topologies are better than others. The method used to extract power has a strong influence on this. In general, all turbines may be classified as either lift-based or drag-based, the former being more efficient. The difference between these groups is the aerodynamic force that is used to extract the energy.

The most common topology is the horizontal-axis wind turbine. It is a lift-based wind turbine with very good performance. Accordingly, it is a popular choice for commercial applications and much research has been applied to this turbine. Despite being a popular lift-based alternative in the latter part of the 20th century, the Darrieus wind turbine is rarely used today. The Savonius wind turbine is the most common drag type turbine. Despite its low efficiency, it remains in use because of its robustness and simplicity to build and maintain.

== General aerodynamic considerations ==
The governing equation for power extraction is:

| $P=\vec{F}\cdot\vec{u}$ | 1 |

where P is the power, F is the force vector, and u is the velocity of the moving wind turbine part.

The force F is generated by the wind's interaction with the blade. The magnitude and distribution of this force is the primary focus of wind-turbine aerodynamics. The most familiar type of aerodynamic force is drag. The direction of the drag force is parallel to the relative wind. Typically, the wind turbine parts are moving, altering the flow around the part. An example of relative wind is the wind one would feel cycling on a calm day.

To extract power, the turbine part must move in the direction of the net force. In the drag force case, the relative wind speed decreases subsequently, and so does the drag force. The relative wind aspect dramatically limits the maximum power that can be extracted by a drag-based wind turbine. Lift-based wind turbines typically have lifting surfaces moving perpendicular to the flow. Here, the relative wind does not decrease; rather, it increases with rotor speed. Thus, the maximum power limits of these machines are much higher than those of drag-based machines.

== Characteristic parameters ==
Wind turbines come in a variety of sizes. Once in operation, a wind turbine experiences a wide range of conditions. This variability complicates the comparison of different types of turbines. To deal with this, nondimensionalization is applied to various qualities. Nondimensionalization allows one to make comparisons between different turbines, without having to consider the effect of things like size and wind conditions from the comparison. One of the qualities of nondimensionalization is that though geometrically similar turbines will produce the same non-dimensional results, other factors (difference in scale, wind properties) cause them to produce very different dimensional properties.

=== Power Coefficient ===
The coefficient of power is the most important variable in wind-turbine aerodynamics. The Buckingham π theorem can be applied to show that the non-dimensional variable for power is given by the equation below. This equation is similar to efficiency, so values between 0 and 1 are typical. However, this is not exactly the same as efficiency and thus in practice, some turbines can exhibit greater than unity power coefficients. In these circumstances, one cannot conclude the first law of thermodynamics is violated because this is not an efficiency term by the strict definition of efficiency.

| $C_P=\frac{P}{\frac{1}{2}\rho A V^3}$ | CP |

where $C_P$ is the coefficient of power, $\rho$ is the air density, A is the area of the wind turbine, and V is the wind speed.

=== Thrust coefficient ===
The thrust coefficient is another important dimensionless number in wind turbine aerodynamics.

| $C_T=\frac{T}{\frac{1}{2} \rho A V^2}$ | CT |

=== Speed ratio ===
Equation (1) shows two important dependents. The first is the speed (U) of the machine. The speed at the tip of the blade is usually used for this purpose, and is written as the product of the blade radius r and the rotational speed of the wind: $U=\omega r$, where $\omega$ is the rotational velocity in radians/second).^{[please clarify]} This variable is nondimensionalized by the wind speed, to obtain the speed ratio:

| $\lambda=\frac{U}{V}$ | SpeedRatio |

=== Lift and drag ===
The force vector is not straightforward, as stated earlier there are two types of aerodynamic forces, lift and drag. Accordingly, there are two non-dimensional parameters. However, both variables are non-dimensionalized in a similar way. The formula for lift is given below, the formula for drag is given after:

| $C_L=\frac{L}{\frac{1}{2}\rho A W^2}$ | CL |

| $C_D=\frac{D}{\frac{1}{2}\rho A W^2}$ | CD |

where $C_L$ is the lift coefficient, $C_D$ is the drag coefficient, $W$ is the relative wind as experienced by the wind turbine blade, and A is the area. Note that A may not be the same area used in the power non-dimensionalization of power.

=== Relative speed ===
The aerodynamic forces have a dependency on W, this speed is the relative speed and it is given by the equation below. Note that this is vector subtraction.

| $\vec{W}=\vec{V}-\vec{U}$ | RelativeSpeed |

== Drag- versus lift-based machines ==
All wind turbines extract energy from the wind through aerodynamic forces. There are two important aerodynamic forces: drag and lift. Drag applies a force on the body in the direction of the relative flow, while lift applies a force perpendicular to the relative flow. Many machine topologies could be classified by the primary force used to extract the energy. For example, a Savonious wind turbine is a drag-based machine, while a Darrieus wind turbine and conventional horizontal-axis wind turbines are lift-based machines. Drag-based machines are conceptually simple, yet suffer from poor efficiency. Efficiency in this analysis is based on the power extracted vs. the plan-form area. Considering that the wind is free, but the blade materials are not, a plan-form-based definition of efficiency is more appropriate.

The analysis is focused on comparing the maximum power extraction modes and nothing else. Accordingly, several idealizations are made to simplify the analysis, further considerations are required to apply this analysis to real turbines. For example, in this comparison the effects of axial momentum theory are ignored. Axial momentum theory demonstrates how the wind turbine imparts an influence on the wind which in-turn decelerates the flow and limits the maximum power. For more details see Betz's law. Since this effect is the same for both lift and drag-based machines it can be ignored for comparison purposes. The topology of the machine can introduce additional losses, for example trailing vorticity in horizontal axis machines degrades the performance at the tip. Typically these losses are minor and can be ignored in this analysis (for example tip loss effects can be reduced by using high aspect-ratio blades).

=== Maximum power of a drag-based wind turbine ===
Equation (1) will be the starting point in this derivation. Equation (CD) is used to define the force, and equation (RelativeSpeed) is used for the relative speed. These substitutions give the following formula for power.

| $P=\frac{1}{2}\rho A C_D \left(UV^2-2VU^2+U^3\right)$ | DragPower |

The formulas (CP) and (SpeedRatio) are applied to express (DragPower) in nondimensional form:

| $C_P=C_D \left(\lambda-2\lambda^2+\lambda^3\right)$ | DragCP |

It can be shown through calculus that equation (DragCP) achieves a maximum at $\lambda=1/3$. By inspection one can see that equation (DragPower) will achieve larger values for $\lambda>1$. In these circumstances, the scalar product in equation (1) makes the result negative. Thus, one can conclude that the maximum power is given by:

$$C_P=\frac{4}{27}C_D$$

Experimentally it has been determined that a large $C_D$ is 1.2, thus the maximum $C_P$ is approximately 0.1778.

=== Maximum power of a lift-based wind turbine ===
The derivation for the maximum power of a lift-based machine is similar, with some modifications. First we must recognize that drag is always present, and thus cannot be ignored. It will be shown that neglecting drag leads to a final solution of infinite power. This result is clearly invalid, hence we will proceed with drag. As before, equations (1), (CD) and (RelativeSpeed) will be used along with (CL) to define the power below expression.

| $P=\frac{1}{2}\rho A \sqrt{U^2+V^2} \left( C_L UV - C_D U^2 \right)$ | LiftPower |

Similarly, this is non-dimensionalized with equations (CP) and (SpeedRatio). However, in this derivation the parameter $\gamma = C_D/C_L$ is also used:

| $C_P=C_L \sqrt{1+\lambda^2} \left( \lambda - \gamma \lambda^2 \right)$ | LiftCP |

Solving the optimal speed ratio is complicated by the dependency on $\gamma$ and the fact that the optimal speed ratio is a solution to a cubic polynomial. Numerical methods can then be applied to determine this solution and the corresponding $C_P$ solution for a range of $\gamma$ results. Some sample solutions are given in the table below.

| $\gamma$ | Optimal $\lambda$ | Optimal $C_P$ |
|---|---|---|
| 0.5 | 1.23 | 0.75 $C_L$ |
| 0.2 | 3.29 | 3.87 $C_L$ |
| 0.1 | 6.64 | 14.98 $C_L$ |
| 0.05 | 13.32 | 59.43 $C_L$ |
| 0.04 | 16.66 | 92.76 $C_L$ |
| 0.03 | 22.2 | 164.78 $C_L$ |
| 0.02 | 33.3 | 370.54 $C_L$ |
| 0.01 | 66.7 | 1481.65 $C_L$ |
| 0.007 | 95.23 | 3023.6 $C_L$ |

Experiments have shown that it is not unreasonable to achieve a drag ratio ($\gamma$) of about 0.01 at a lift coefficient of 0.6. This would give a $C_P$ of about 889. This is substantially better than the best drag-based machine, and explains why lift-based machines are superior.

In the analysis given here, there is an inconsistency compared to typical wind turbine non-dimensionalization. As stated in the preceding section, the A (area) in the $C_P$ non-dimensionalization is not always the same as the A in the force equations (CL) and (CD). Typically for $C_P$ the A is the area swept by the rotor blade in its motion. For $C_L$ and $C_D$ A is the area of the turbine wing section. For drag based machines, these two areas are almost identical so there is little difference. To make the lift based results comparable to the drag results, the area of the wing section was used to non-dimensionalize power. The results here could be interpreted as power per unit of material. Given that the material represents the cost (wind is free), this is a better variable for comparison.

If one were to apply conventional non-dimensionalization, more information on the motion of the blade would be required. However the discussion on horizontal-axis wind turbines will show that the maximum $C_P$ there is 16/27. Thus, even by conventional non-dimensional analysis lift based machines are superior to drag based machines.

There are several idealizations to the analysis. In any lift-based machine (aircraft included) with finite wings, there is a wake that affects the incoming flow and creates induced drag. This phenomenon exists in wind turbines and was neglected in this analysis. Including induced drag requires information specific to the topology. In these cases it is expected that both the optimal speed-ratio and the optimal $C_P$ would be less. The analysis focused on the aerodynamic potential but neglected structural aspects. In reality most optimal wind-turbine design becomes a compromise between optimal aerodynamic design and optimal structural design.

== Horizontal-axis wind turbine ==
The aerodynamics of a horizontal-axis wind turbine are not straightforward. The air flow at the blades is not the same as the airflow further away from the turbine. The very nature of the way in which energy is extracted from the air also causes air to be deflected by the turbine. In addition, the aerodynamics of a wind turbine at the rotor surface exhibit phenomena rarely seen in other aerodynamic fields.

== Axial momentum and the Lanchester–Betz–Joukowsky limit ==
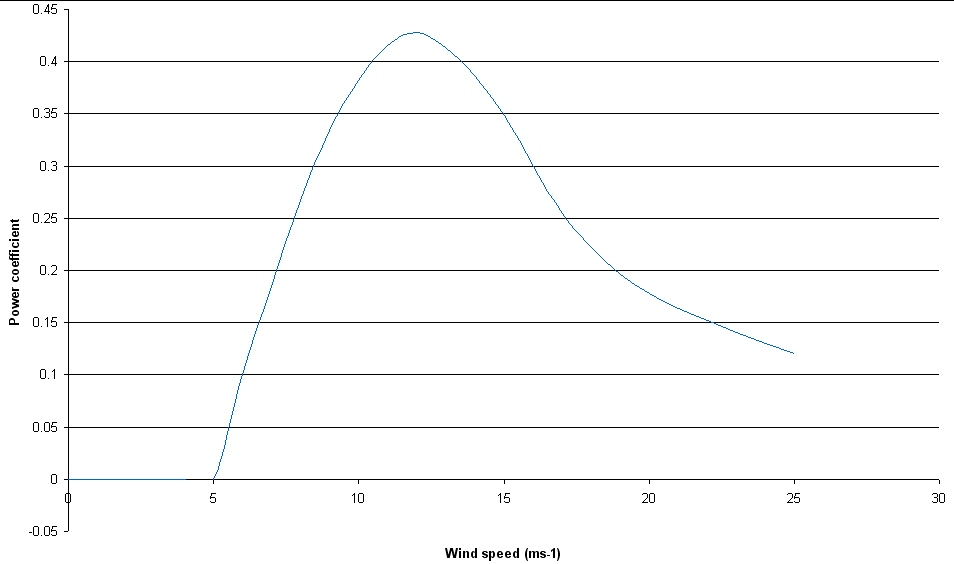
Wind turbine power coefficient

Distribution of wind speed (red) and energy generated (blue). The histogram shows measured data, while the curve is the Rayleigh model distribution for the same average wind speed.

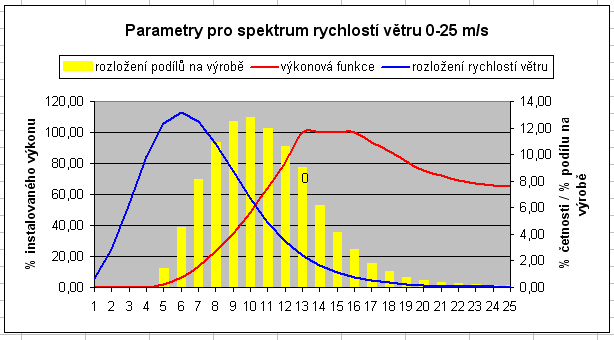
Distribution of wind speed (blue) and energy generated (yellow).

Energy in fluid is contained in four different forms: gravitational potential energy, thermodynamic pressure, kinetic energy from the velocity and finally thermal energy. Gravitational and thermal energy have a negligible effect on the energy extraction process. From a macroscopic point of view, the air flow around the wind turbine is at atmospheric pressure. If pressure is constant then only kinetic energy is extracted. However up close near the rotor itself the air velocity is constant as it passes through the rotor plane. This is because of conservation of mass: the air that passes through the rotor cannot slow down because it needs to stay out of the way of the air behind it. So at the rotor the energy is extracted by a pressure drop. The air directly behind the wind turbine is at sub-atmospheric pressure; the air in front is at greater than atmospheric pressure. It is this high pressure in front of the wind turbine that deflects some of the upstream air around the turbine.

Frederick W. Lanchester was the first to study this phenomenon in application to ship propellers; five years later Nikolai Yegorovich Zhukovsky and Albert Betz independently arrived at the same results. It is believed that each researcher was not aware of the others' work because of World War I and the Bolshevik Revolution. Formally, the proceeding limit should thus be referred to as the Lanchester–Betz–Joukowsky limit. In general Albert Betz is credited with this accomplishment because he published his work in a journal that had wide circulation, while the other two published it in the publication associated with their respective institutions. Thus it is widely known as simply the Betz Limit.

This limit is derived by looking at the axial momentum of the air passing through the wind turbine. As stated above, some of the air is deflected away from the turbine. This causes the air passing through the rotor plane to have a smaller velocity than the free stream velocity. The ratio of this reduction to that of the air velocity far away from the wind turbine is called the axial induction factor. It is defined as

$$a \equiv \frac{U_1 - U_2}{U_1}$$

where a is the axial induction factor, U_{1} is the wind speed far away upstream from the rotor, and U_{2} is the wind speed at the rotor.

The first step to deriving the Betz limit is to apply the principle of conservation of momentum. As stated above, the effect of the wind turbine is to attenuate the flow. A location downstream of the turbine sees a lower wind speed than a location upstream of the turbine. This would violate the conservation of momentum if the wind turbine was not applying a thrust force on the flow. This thrust force manifests itself through the pressure drop across the rotor. The front operates at high pressure while the back operates at low pressure. The pressure difference from the front to back causes the thrust force. The momentum lost in the turbine is balanced by the thrust force.

Another equation is needed to relate the pressure difference to the velocity of the flow near the turbine. Here, the Bernoulli equation is used between the field flow and the flow near the wind turbine. There is one limitation to the Bernoulli equation: the equation cannot be applied to fluid passing through the wind turbine. Instead, conservation of mass is used to relate the incoming air to the outlet air. Betz used these equations and managed to solve the velocities of the flow in the far wake and near the wind turbine in terms of the far field flow and the axial induction factor. The velocities are given below as:

$$\begin{align}
U_2 &= U_1(1 - a)\\
U_4 &= U_1(1 - 2a)
\end{align}$$

U_{4} is introduced here as the wind velocity in the far wake. This is important because the power extracted from the turbine is defined by the following equation. However the Betz limit is given in terms of the coefficient of power $C_p$. The coefficient of power is similar to efficiency but not the same. The formula for the coefficient of power is given beneath the formula for power:

$$\begin{align}
P   &=      0.5\rho AU_2(U_1^2 - U_4^2)\\
C_p &\equiv \frac{P}{0.5\rho AU_1^3}
\end{align}$$

Betz was able to develop an expression for $C_p$ in terms of the induction factors. This is done by the velocity relations being substituted into power and power is substituted into the coefficient of power definition. The relationship Betz developed is given below:

$$C_p = 4a(1 - a)^2$$

The Betz limit is defined by the maximum value that can be given by the above formula. This is found by taking the derivative with respect to the axial induction factor, setting it to zero and solving for the axial induction factor. Betz was able to show that the optimum axial induction factor is one third. The optimum axial induction factor was then used to find the maximum coefficient of power. This maximum coefficient is the Betz limit. Betz was able to show that the maximum coefficient of power of a wind turbine is 16/27. Airflow operating at higher thrust will cause the axial induction factor to rise above the optimum value. Higher thrust causes more air to be deflected away from the turbine. When the axial induction factor falls below the optimum value, the wind turbine is not extracting all the energy it can. This reduces pressure around the turbine and allows more air to pass through it, but not enough to account for the lack of energy being extracted.

The derivation of the Betz limit shows a simple analysis of wind turbine aerodynamics. In reality there is a lot more. A more rigorous analysis would include wake rotation, the effect of variable geometry, the important effect of airfoils on the flow, etc. Within airfoils alone, the wind turbine aerodynamicist has to consider the effects of surface roughness, dynamic stall tip losses, and solidity, among other problems.

== Angular momentum and wake rotation ==
The wind turbine described by Betz does not actually exist. It is merely an idealized wind turbine described as an actuator disk. It's a disk in space where fluid energy is simply extracted from the air. In the Betz turbine the energy extraction manifests itself through thrust. The equivalent turbine described by Betz would be a horizontal propeller type operating at infinite tip speed ratios and no losses. The tip speed ratio is the ratio of the speed of the tip relative to the free stream flow. Actual turbines try to run very high L/D airfoils at high tip speed ratios to attempt to approximate this, but there are still additional losses in the wake because of these limitations.

One key difference between actual turbines and the actuator disk, is that energy is extracted through torque. The wind imparts a torque on the wind turbine, thrust is a necessary by-product of torque. Newtonian physics dictates that for every action there is an equal and opposite reaction. If the wind imparts torque on the blades, then the blades must be imparting torque on the wind. This torque would then cause the flow to rotate. Thus the flow in the wake has two components: axial and tangential. This tangential flow is referred to as a wake rotation.

Torque is necessary for energy extraction. However wake rotation is considered a loss. Accelerating the flow in the tangential direction increases the absolute velocity. This in turn increases the amount of kinetic energy in the near wake. This rotational energy is not dissipated in any form that would allow for a greater pressure drop (Energy extraction). Thus any rotational energy in the wake is energy that is lost and unavailable.

This loss is minimized by allowing the rotor to rotate very quickly. To the observer it may seem like the rotor is not moving fast; however, it is common for the tips to be moving through the air at 8-10 times the speed of the free stream. Newtonian mechanics defines power as torque multiplied by the rotational speed. The same amount of power can be extracted by allowing the rotor to rotate faster and produce less torque. Less torque means that there is less wake rotation. Less wake rotation means there is more energy available to extract. However, very high tip speeds also increase the drag on the blades, decreasing power production. Balancing these factors is what leads to most modern horizontal-axis wind turbines running at a tip speed ratio around 9. In addition, wind turbines usually limit the tip speed to around 80-90m/s due to leading edge erosion and high noise levels. At wind speeds above about 10m/s (where a turbine running a tip speed ratio of 9 would reach 90m/s tip speed), turbines usually do not continue to increase rotational speed for this reason, which slightly reduces efficiency.

== Blade element and momentum theory ==
The simplest model for horizontal-axis wind turbine aerodynamics is blade element momentum theory. The theory is based on the assumption that the flow at a given annulus does not affect the flow at adjacent annuli. This allows the rotor blade to be analyzed in sections, where the resulting forces are summed over all sections to get the overall forces of the rotor. The theory uses both axial and angular momentum balances to determine the flow and the resulting forces at the blade.

The momentum equations for the far field flow dictate that the thrust and torque will induce a secondary flow in the approaching wind. This in turn affects the flow geometry at the blade. The blade itself is the source of these thrust and torque forces. The force response of the blades is governed by the geometry of the flow, or better known as the angle of attack. Refer to the Airfoil article for more information on how airfoils create lift and drag forces at various angles of attack. This interplay between the far field momentum balances and the local blade forces requires one to solve the momentum equations and the airfoil equations simultaneously. Typically computers and numerical methods are employed to solve these models.

There is a lot of variation between different versions of blade element momentum theory. First, one can consider the effect of wake rotation or not. Second, one can go further and consider the pressure drop induced in wake rotation. Third, the tangential induction factors can be solved with a momentum equation, an energy balance or orthogonal geometric constraint; the latter a result of Biot–Savart law in vortex methods. These all lead to different set of equations that need to be solved. The simplest and most widely used equations are those that consider wake rotation with the momentum equation but ignore the pressure drop from wake rotation. Those equations are given below. a is the axial component of the induced flow, a' is the tangential component of the induced flow. $\sigma$ is the solidity of the rotor, $\phi$ is the local inflow angle. $C_n$ and $C_t$ are the coefficient of normal force and the coefficient of tangential force respectively. Both these coefficients are defined with the resulting lift and drag coefficients of the airfoil:

$$\begin{align}
a &= \frac{1}{\frac{4}{C_n\sigma}\sin^2\phi + 1}\\
a'&= \frac{1}{\frac{4}{C_t\sigma}\sin\phi \cos\phi - 1}
\end{align}$$

=== Corrections to blade element momentum theory ===
Blade element momentum theory alone fails to represent accurately the true physics of real wind turbines. Two major shortcomings are the effects of a discrete number of blades and far field effects when the turbine is heavily loaded. Secondary shortcomings originate from having to deal with transient effects like dynamic stall, rotational effects like the Coriolis force and centrifugal pumping, and geometric effects that arise from coned and yawed rotors. The current state of the art in blade element momentum theory uses corrections to deal with these major shortcomings. These corrections are discussed below. There is as yet no accepted treatment for the secondary shortcomings. These areas remain a highly active area of research in wind turbine aerodynamics.

The effect of the discrete number of blades is dealt with by applying the Prandtl tip loss factor. The most common form of this factor is given below where B is the number of blades, R is the outer radius and r is the local radius. The definition of F is based on actuator disk models and not directly applicable to blade element momentum theory. However the most common application multiplies induced velocity term by F in the momentum equations. As in the momentum equation there are many variations for applying F, some argue that the mass flow should be corrected in either the axial equation, or both axial and tangential equations. Others have suggested a second tip loss term to account for the reduced blade forces at the tip. Shown below are the above momentum equations with the most common application of F:

$$\begin{align}
F  &= \frac{2}{\pi}\arccos\left[e^{-\frac{B (R - r)}{2r\sin\phi}}\right]\\
a  &= \frac{1}{\frac{4}{C_n\sigma}F\sin^2\phi + 1}\\
a' &= \frac{1}{\frac{4}{C_t\sigma}F\sin\phi\cos\phi - 1}
\end{align}$$

The typical momentum theory is effective only for axial induction factors up to 0.4 (thrust coefficient of 0.96). Beyond this point the wake collapses and turbulent mixing occurs. This state is highly transient and largely unpredictable by theoretical means. Accordingly, several empirical relations have been developed. As the usual case there are several version; however a simple one that is commonly used is a linear curve fit given below, with $a_c=0.2$. The turbulent wake function given excludes the tip loss function, however the tip loss is applied simply by multiplying the resulting axial induction by the tip loss function.

$C_T = 4\left[a_c^2 + (1 - 2a_c)a\right]$ when $a > a_c$

The terms $C_T$ and $C_t$ represent different quantities. The first one is the thrust coefficient of the rotor, which is the one which should be corrected for high rotor loading (i.e., for high values of $a$), while the second one ($c_t$) is the tangential aerodynamic coefficient of an individual blade element, which is given by the aerodynamic lift and drag coefficients.

A "Unified momentum model for rotor aerodynamics across operating regimes" which claims to extend validity also for 0.5 < a < 1 was published recently https://doi.org/10.1038/s41467-024-50756-5 .

== Aerodynamic modeling ==
Blade element momentum theory is widely used due to its simplicity and overall accuracy, but its originating assumptions limit its use when the rotor disk is yawed, or when other non-axisymmetric effects (like the rotor wake) influence the flow. Limited success at improving predictive accuracy has been made using computational fluid dynamics (CFD) solvers based on Reynolds-averaged Navier–Stokes equations and other similar three-dimensional models such as free vortex methods. These are very computationally intensive simulations to perform for several reasons. First, the solver must accurately model the far-field flow conditions, which can extend several rotor diameters up- and down-stream and include atmospheric boundary layer turbulence, while at the same time resolving the small-scale boundary-layer flow conditions at the blades' surface (necessary to capture blade stall). In addition, many CFD solvers have difficulty meshing parts that move and deform, such as the rotor blades. Finally, there are many dynamic flow phenomena that are not easily modelled by Reynolds-averaged Navier–Stokes equations, such as dynamic stall and tower shadow. Due to the computational complexity, it is not currently practical to use these advanced methods for wind turbine design, though research continues in these and other areas related to helicopter and wind turbine aerodynamics.

Free vortex models and Lagrangian particle vortex methods are both active areas of research that seek to increase modelling accuracy by accounting for more of the three-dimensional and unsteady flow effects than either blade element momentum theory or Reynolds-averaged Navier–Stokes equations. Free vortex models are similar to lifting line theory in that they assume that the wind turbine rotor is shedding either a continuous vortex filament from the blade tips (and often the root), or a continuous vortex sheet from the blades' trailing edges. Lagrangian particle vortex methods can use a variety of methods to introduce vorticity into the wake. Biot–Savart summation is used to determine the induced flow field of these wake vortices' circulations, allowing for better approximations of the local flow over the rotor blades. These methods have largely confirmed much of the applicability of blade element momentum theory and shed insight into the structure of wind turbine wakes. Free vortex models have limitations due to its origin in potential flow theory, such as not explicitly modeling model viscous behavior (without semi-empirical core models), though the Lagrangian particle vortex method is a fully viscous method. Lagrangian particle vortex methods are more computationally intensive than either free vortex models or Reynolds-averaged Navier–Stokes equations, and free vortex models still rely on blade element theory for the blade forces.

== See also ==
- Blade solidity
- Wind turbine design

== Sources ==
- Hansen, M.O.L. Aerodynamics of Wind Turbines, 3rd ed., Routledge, 2015 ISBN 978-1138775077
- Schmitz, S. Aerodynamics of Wind Turbines: A Physical Basis for Analysis and Design, Wiley, 2019 ISBN 978-1-119-40564-1
- Schaffarczyk, A.P. Introduction to Wind Turbine Aerodynamics, 3rd ed., SpringerNature, 2024 doi:10.1007/978-3-031-56924
