= Troposkein =

Momentum curve of a rope

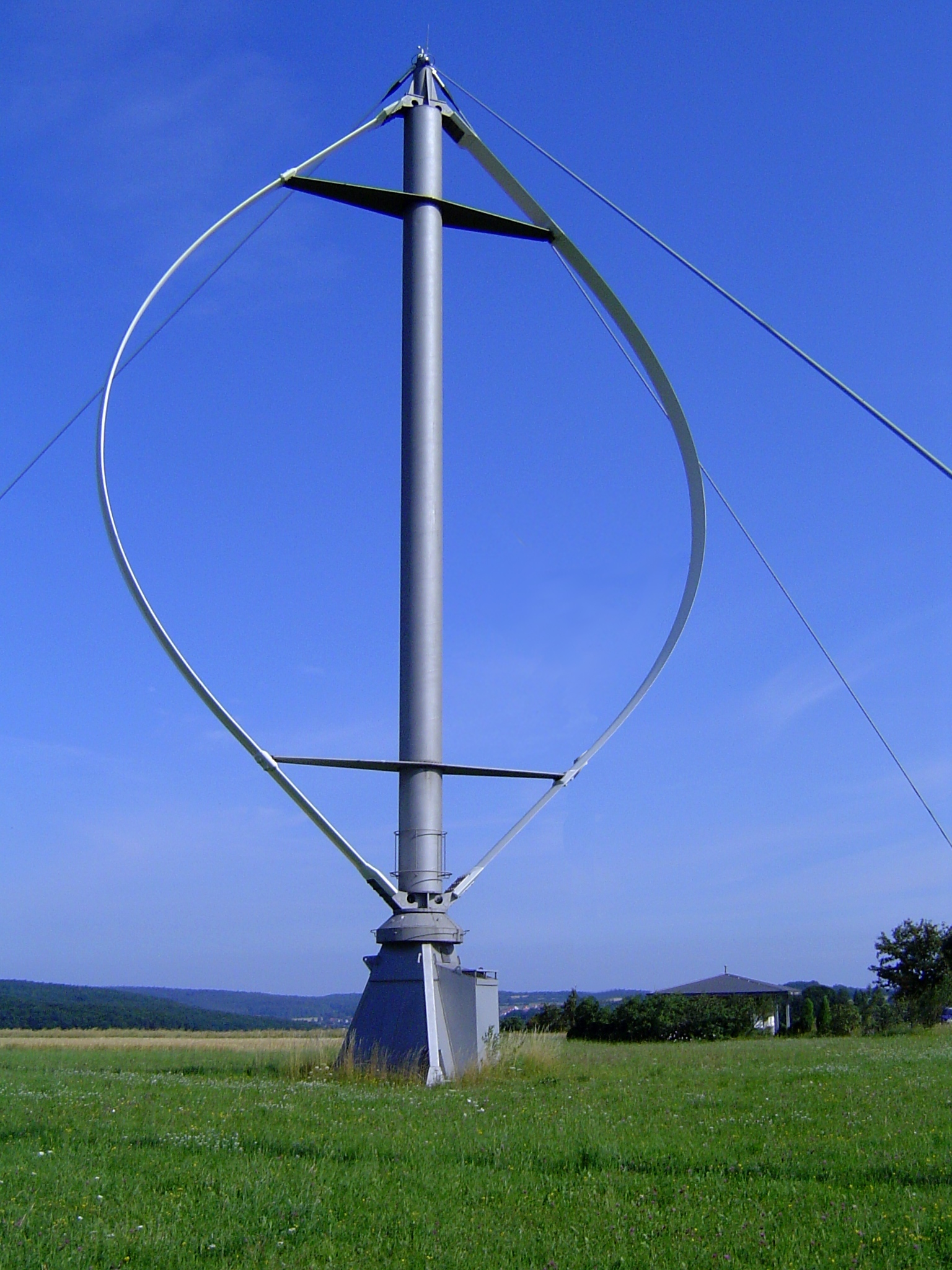
A Darrieus wind turbine has blades that approximate the shape of a troposkein to minimize bending stresses

In physics and geometry, the troposkein (from Ancient Greek: τρόπος, romanized: trópos, lit. 'turn' and: σχοῖνος, romanized: skhoînos, lit. 'rope') (Note: In English language scientific literature it has been variously spelled as troposkein, troposkien, troposkin, troposkine.) is the curve an idealized rope assumes when anchored at its ends and spun around its long axis at a constant angular velocity. This shape is similar to the shape assumed by a skipping rope, and is independent of rotational speed in the absence of gravity, but varies with respect to rotational speed in the presence of gravity. The troposkein does not have a closed-form representation; in the absence of gravity, though, it can be approximated by a pair of line segments spanned by a circular arc (tangential to the line segments at its endpoints). The form of a troposkein can be approximated for a given gravitational acceleration, rope density and angular velocity by iterative approximation. This shape is also useful for decreasing the stress experienced by the blades of a Darrieus vertical axis wind turbine.
