= Georges Jean Marie Darrieus =

French aerospace and electrical engineer

Georges Jean Marie Eugene Darrieus
- Born: 24 September 1888; Toulon, France
- Died: 16 July 1979 (aged 90); Houilles, France
- Education: École Centrale Paris; ENSEEIHT
- Known for: Darrieus–Landau instability Darrieus wind turbine
- Scientific career
- Workplaces: Compagnie Électro-Mécanique

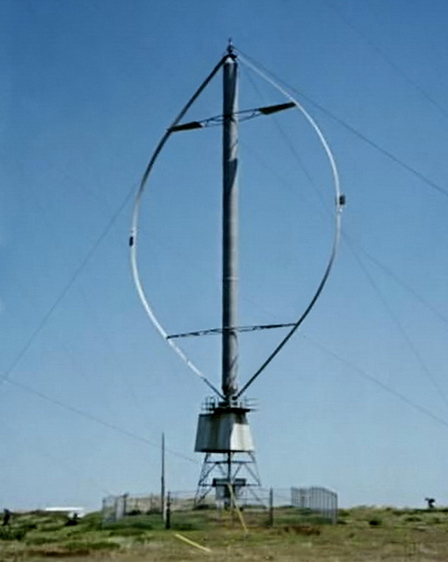

Georges Jean Marie Darrieus (24 September 1888 – 15 July 1979) was a French aeronautical engineer in the 20th century. He invented the Darrieus rotor, a wind turbine capable of operating from any direction and under adverse weather conditions, and the vertical-axis giromill.

The invention is described in the 1931 U.S. patent 1,835,018.

Darrieus is also known for the introduction of laminated pressplates into the construction of the stators used in synchronous generators thus reducing the core losses.

== Biography ==
In World War I, Georges Darrieus was appointed as the artillery captain in 1917.

== Sources ==
- Neidhöfer, Gerhard (1992). "The evolution of the synchronous machine" (PDF). Engineering Science and Education Journal. 1 (5): 239–248. doi:10.1049/esej:19920050 (inactive 12 July 2025).
