= Savonius wind turbine =

Type of wind turbine that spins along its vertical axis

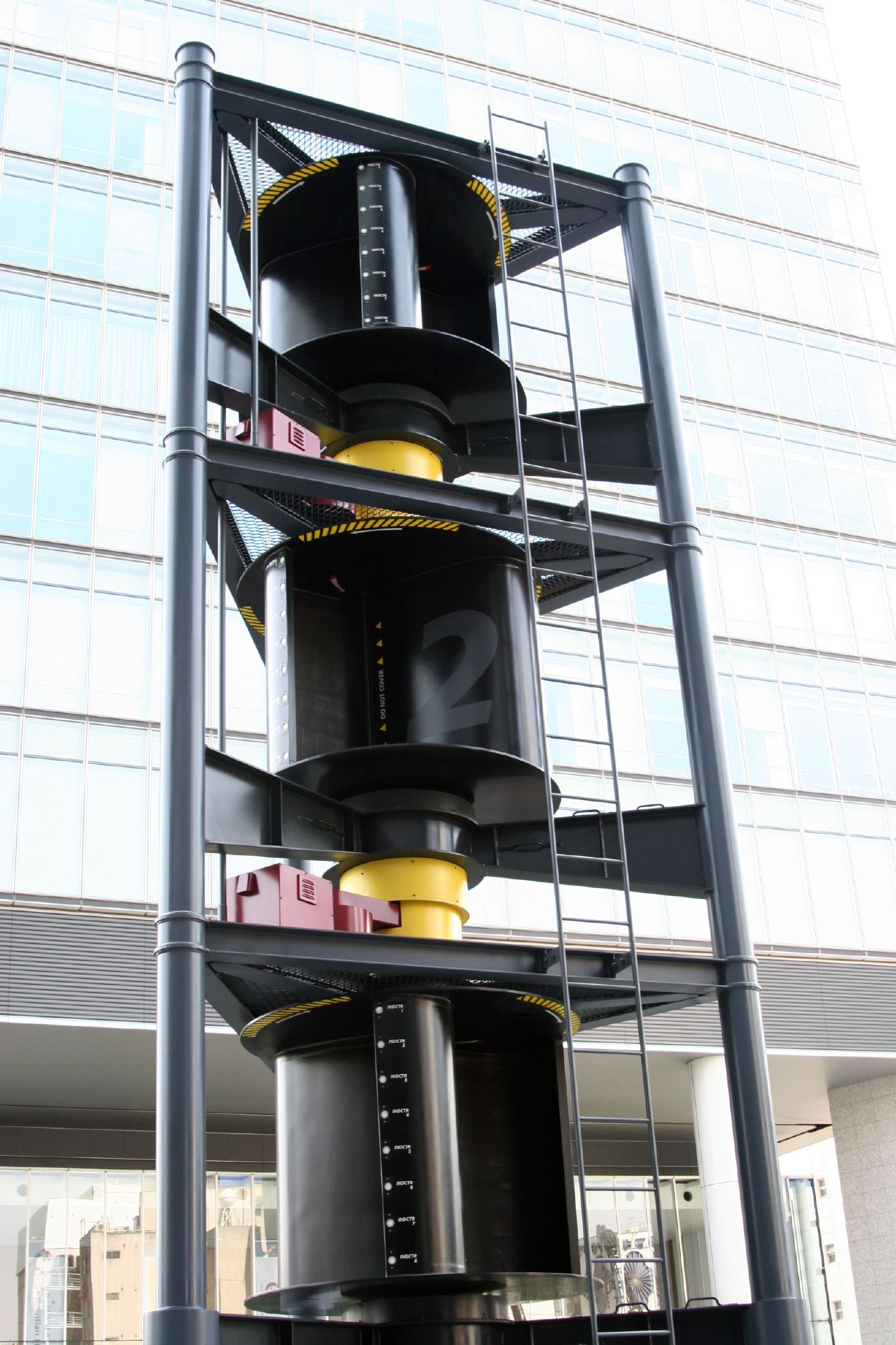
A Savonius wind turbine in Akihabara, Japan

Savonius wind turbines are a type of vertical-axis wind turbine (VAWT), used for converting the force of the wind into torque on a rotating shaft. The turbine consists of a number of aerofoils, usually—but not always—vertically mounted on a rotating shaft or framework, either ground stationed or tethered in airborne systems.

== Origin ==
The Savonius wind turbine was invented by the Finnish engineer Sigurd Johannes Savonius in 1922 and patented in 1926. Europeans had earlier experimented with curved blades on vertical wind turbines for many decades. The earliest mention is by the Bishop of Csanád County, Fausto Veranzio, who was also an engineer. He wrote in his 1616 book Machinae novae about several vertical axis wind turbines with curved or V-shaped blades. None of his or any other earlier examples reached the state of development achieved by Savonius. In his biography, there is mention of his intention to develop a turbine-type rotor similar to the Flettner rotor, but self-rotating. He experimented with his rotor on various small rowing craft on lakes in Finland. No results of his investigations are known, but the Magnus effect is confirmed by Felix van König (1978). Two Savonius wind turbine patents were filed in the U.S.: one in 1925 and one in 1928, by Savonius.

== Operation ==
Schematic drawing of a two-scoop Savonius turbine

The Savonius turbine is one of the simplest turbines. Aerodynamically, it is a drag-type device, consisting of two or three scoops. Looking down on the rotor from above, a two-scoop machine might resemble the letter "S" in cross section. Because of the curvature, the scoops experience less drag when moving against the wind than when moving with the wind. The differential drag causes the Savonius turbine to spin. Because they are drag-type devices, Savonius turbines extract much less of the wind's power than other similarly sized lift-type turbines. In practice, much of the swept area of a Savonius rotor may be near the ground if it has a short mount without an extended post, making the overall energy extraction less effective due to the lower wind speeds found at lower heights. They have several advantages over horizontal axis wind turbines, notably, low noise levels, the ability to operate with low wind speeds and relative independence on the wind direction.

== Power and rotational speed ==
According to Betz's law, the maximum power that is possible to extract from a theoretical ideal rotor is $P_{\mathrm{max}} = \frac{16}{27} \frac{1}{2} \rho \cdot h \cdot d \cdot v^3$, where $\rho$ is the density of air, $h$ and $d$ are the height and diameter of the rotor and $v$ is the wind speed. However, in practice the extractable power is about half that (one can argue that only one half of the rotor — the scoop co-moving with the wind — works at each instant of time) and depends also on the efficiency of the given rotor. Thus, for the theoretical ideal rotor, one gets $P_{\mathrm{max}} \approx 0.18\, \mathrm{kg\, m^{-3}} \cdot h \cdot d \cdot v^3$, but the average maximum efficiency $Cp$ of the Savonius wind turbine is around 20% ($Cp = 0.2$), making the real extractable power of the typical Savonius $P_{\mathrm{max}} \approx 0.12\, \mathrm{kg\, m^{-3}} \cdot h \cdot d \cdot v^3$.

The angular frequency of a rotor is given by $\omega = \frac{\lambda \cdot v}{r}$, where $r$ is the radius and $\lambda$ is a dimensionless factor called the tip-speed ratio. λ is a characteristic of each specific windmill, and for a Savonius rotor λ is typically around unity.

For example, an oil-barrel sized Savonius rotor with h=1 m and r=0.5 m under a wind of v=10 m/s, will generate a maximum power of 120 W and a maximum angular speed of 20 rad/s (190 revolutions per minute).

== Use ==
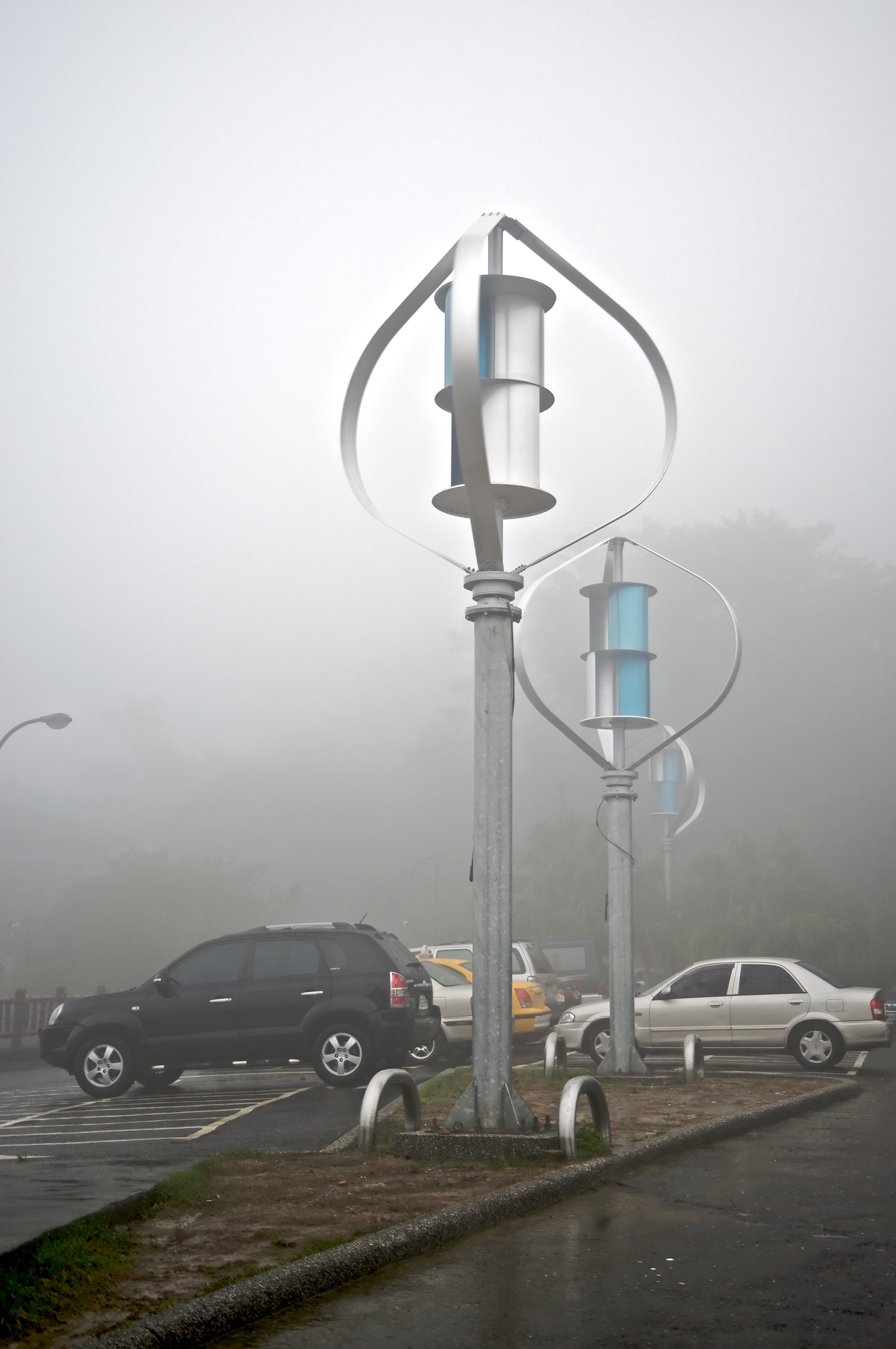
Combined Darrieus–Savonius generator in Taiwan

Savonius turbines are used whenever cost or reliability is much more important than efficiency. Most anemometers are Savonius turbines for this reason, as efficiency is irrelevant to the application of measuring wind speed. Much larger Savonius turbines have been used to generate electric power on deep-water buoys, which need small amounts of power and get very little maintenance. Design is simplified because, unlike with horizontal axis wind turbines (HAWTs), no pointing mechanism is required to allow for shifting wind direction and the turbine is self-starting. Savonius and other vertical-axis machines are suited to pumping water and other high torque, low rpm applications, and are not usually connected to electric power grids. In the early 1980s, Risto Joutsiniemi developed a helical rotor version that does not require end plates, has a smoother torque profile and is self-starting in the same manner as is a crossed pair of straight rotors.

The most ubiquitous application of the Savonius wind turbine is the Flettner ventilator, which is commonly seen on the roofs of vans and buses and is used as a cooling device. This rotor was developed for ventilation by the German aircraft engineer Anton Flettner in the 1920s. It uses the Savonius wind turbine to drive an extractor fan. The vents are still manufactured in the UK by Flettner Ventilator Limited.

Specifically constructed Savonius wind turbines have been used to provide power to autonomous neutrino detector stations of the ARIANNA experiment on the Ross-Ice Shelf in Antarctica.

In Europe, small Savonius wind turbines can sometimes be seen used as "animated" advertising signs in which the rotational movement helps to draw attention to the item advertised. They sometimes feature a simple two-frame animation.

== Tethered airborne Savonius turbines ==
- Airborne wind turbines
- Kite types
- When the Savonius rotor axis is set horizontally and tethered, then kiting results. There are scores of patents and products that use the net lift Magnus effect that occurs in the autorotation of the Savonius rotor. The spin may be mined for some of its energy for making sound, heat, or electricity.

== Gallery ==
Operation of a Savonius turbine

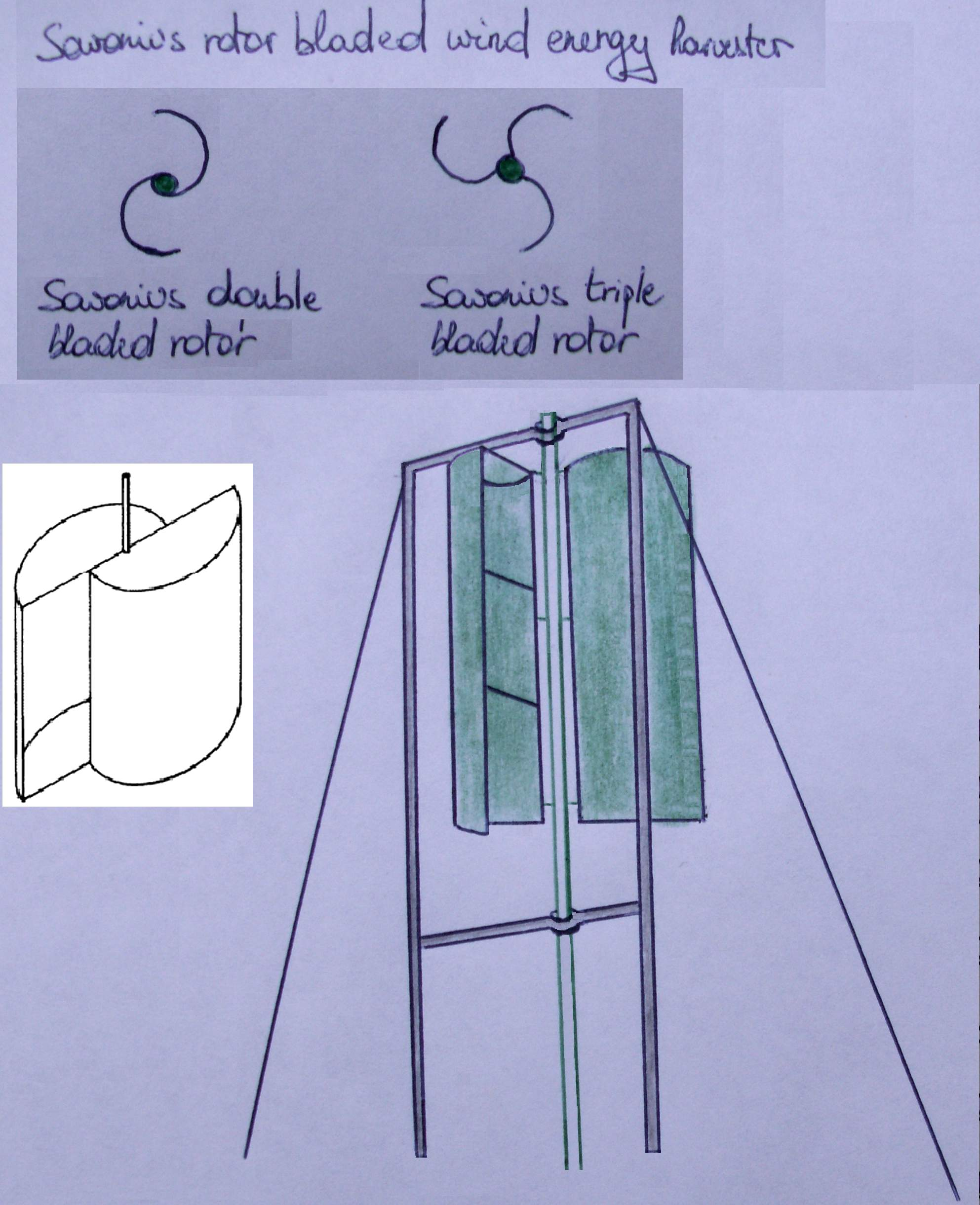
A Savonius rotor bladed WECS
