= Vertical-axis wind turbine =

Type of wind turbine

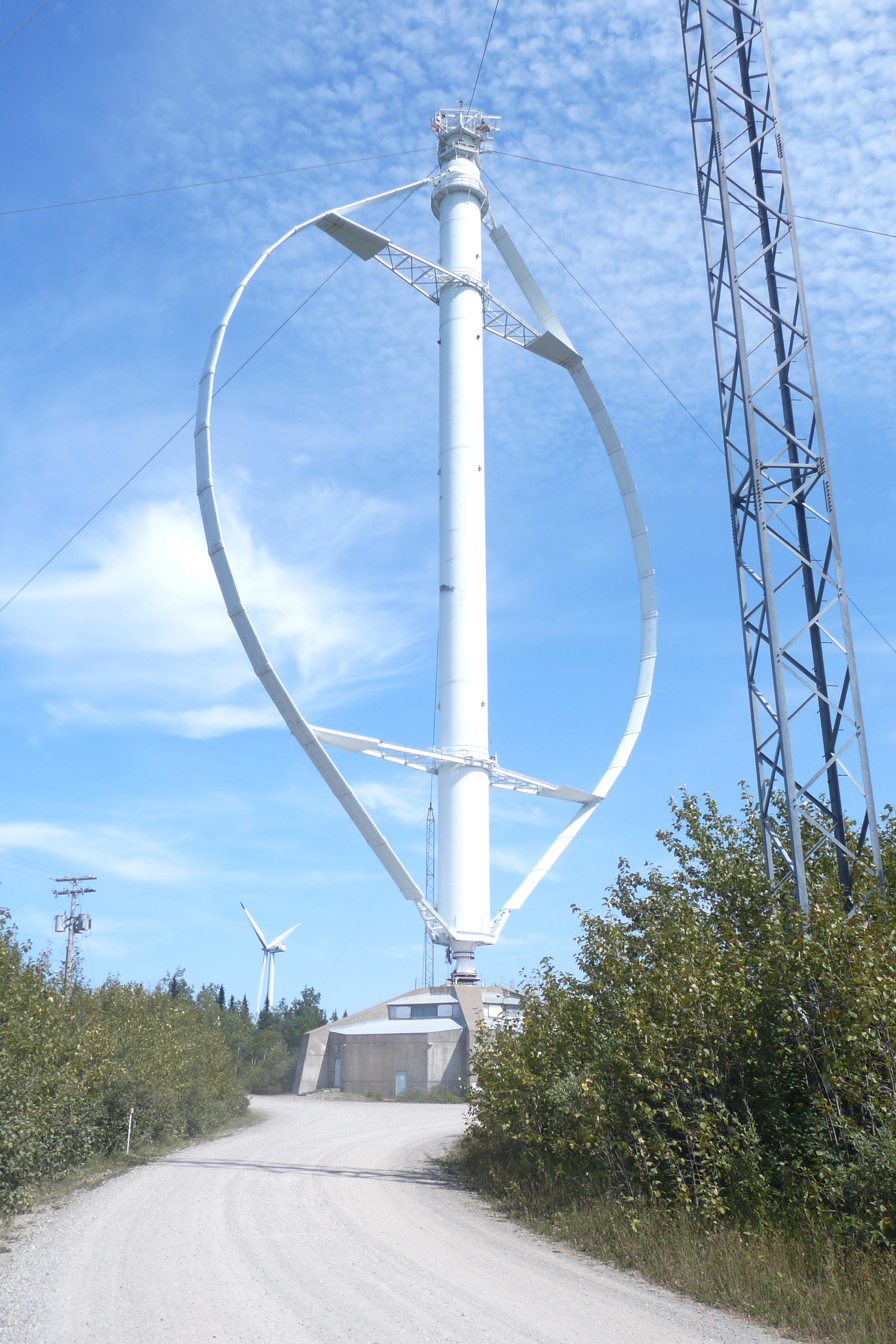
The world's tallest vertical-axis wind turbine, in Cap-Chat, Quebec. It is 110 m tall and produced 4 MW of power.

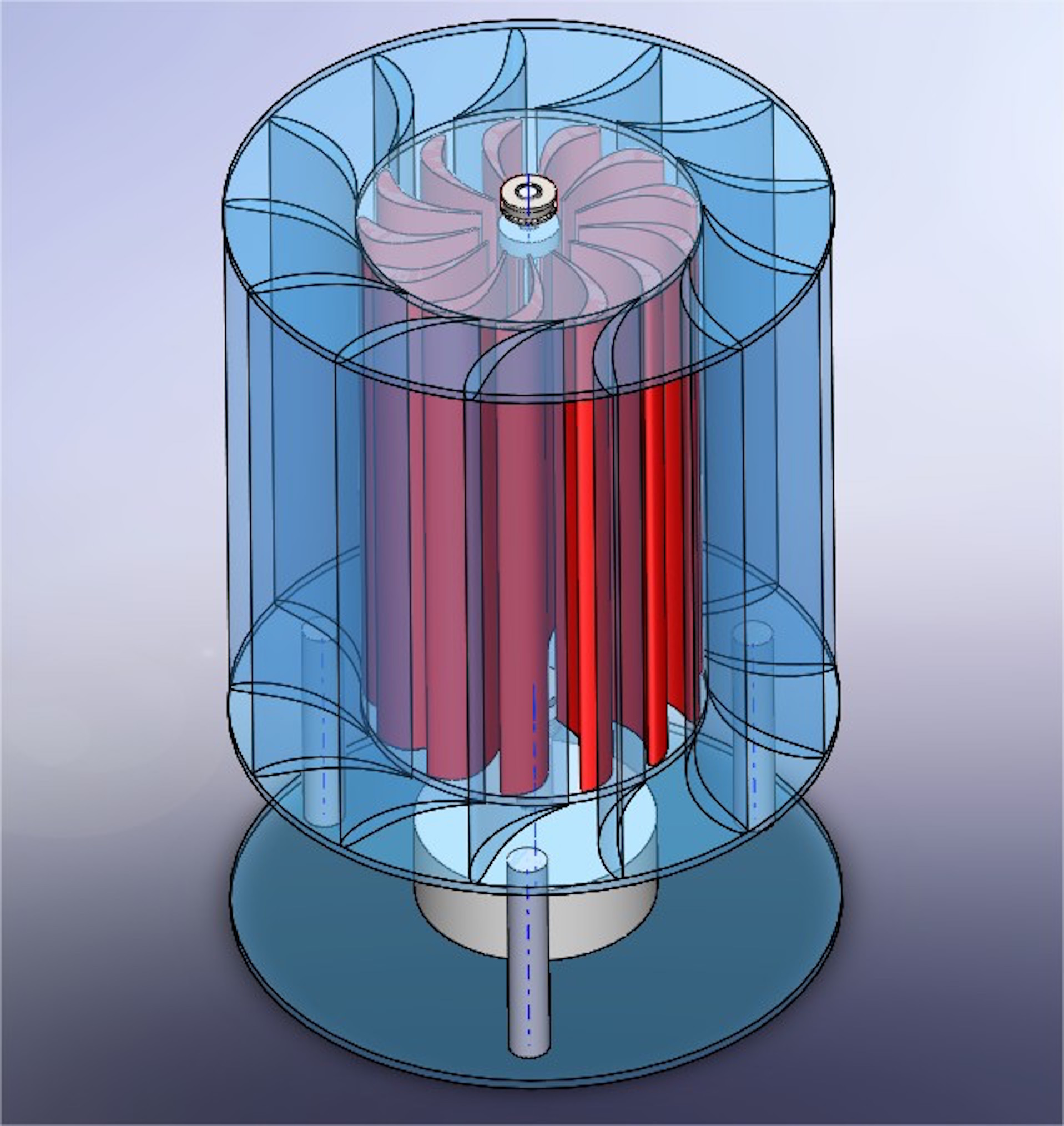
Vortexis schematic

Vertical axis wind turbine offshore

A vertical-axis wind turbine (VAWT) is a type of wind turbine where the main rotor shaft is set transverse to the wind while the main components are located at the base of the turbine. This arrangement allows the generator and gearbox to be located close to the ground, facilitating service and repair. VAWTs do not need to be pointed into the wind, which removes the need for wind-sensing and orientation mechanisms. Major drawbacks for the early designs (Savonius, Darrieus and giromill) included the significant torque ripple during each revolution and the large bending moments on the blades. Later designs addressed the torque ripple by sweeping the blades helically (Gorlov type). Savonius vertical-axis wind turbines (VAWT) are not widespread, but their simplicity and better performance in disturbed flow-fields, compared to small horizontal-axis wind turbines (HAWT) make them a good alternative for distributed generation devices in an urban environment.

A vertical axis wind turbine has its axis perpendicular to the wind streamlines and vertical to the ground. A more general term that includes this option is a "transverse axis wind turbine" or "cross-flow wind turbine". For example, the original Darrieus patent, US patent 1835018, includes both options.

Drag-type VAWTs such as the Savonius rotor typically operate at lower tip speed ratios than lift-based VAWTs such as Darrieus rotors and cycloturbines.

Computer modelling suggests that vertical-axis wind turbines arranged in wind farms may generate more than 15% more power per turbine than when acting in isolation. Some, like the Airfoil generator design, have very little post-turbine turbulence, allowing them to be installed closer for a more effective use of land.

== General aerodynamics ==
The forces and the velocities acting in a Darrieus turbine are depicted in Figure 1. The resultant velocity vector, $\vec{W}$, is the vectorial sum of the undisturbed upstream air velocity, $\vec{U}$, and the velocity vector of the advancing blade, $-\vec{\omega }\times\vec{R}$.

$$\vec{W}=\vec{U}+\left( -\vec{\omega }\times\vec{R} \right)$$

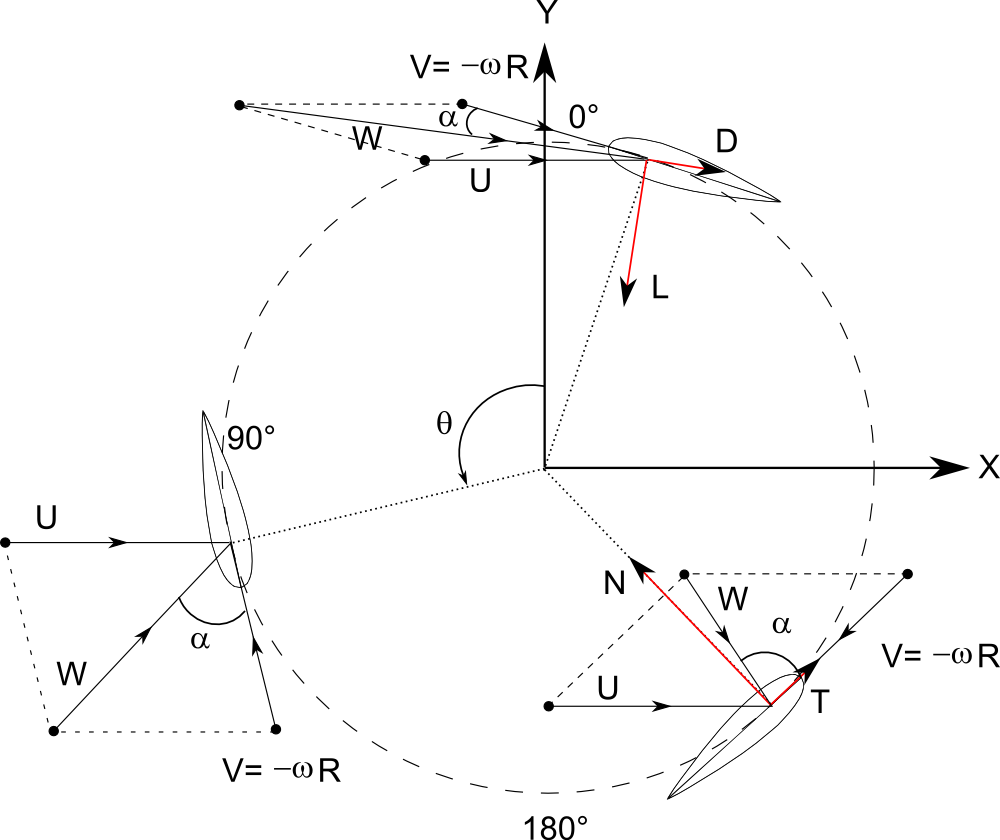
Figure 1: Forces and velocities acting in a Darrieus turbine for various azimuthal positions

Thus the oncoming fluid velocity varies during each cycle. Maximum velocity is found for $\theta =0{}^\circ$ and the minimum is found for $\theta =180{}^\circ$, where $\theta$ is the azimuthal or orbital blade position. The angle of attack, $\alpha$, is the angle between the oncoming air speed, W, and the blade's chord. The resultant airflow creates a varying, positive angle of attack to the blade in the upstream zone of the machine, switching sign in the downstream zone of the machine.

It follows from geometric considerations of angular velocity as seen in the accompanying figure that:

$$V_t=R \omega + U\cos(\theta)$$

and:

$$V_n=U \sin(\theta)$$

Solving for the relative velocity as the resultant of the tangential and normal components yields:

$W= \sqrt{V_t^2+V_n^2}$

Thus, combining the above with the definitions for the tip speed ratio $\lambda =(\omega R) /U$ yields the following expression for the resultant velocity:

$W=U\sqrt{1+2\lambda \cos \theta +\lambda ^{2}}$

Angle of attack is solved as:

$$\alpha = \tan^{-1} \left( \frac{V_n}{V_t} \right)$$

Which when substituting the above yields:

$\alpha =\tan ^{-1}\left( \frac{\sin \theta }{\cos \theta +\lambda } \right)$

The resultant aerodynamic force is resolved either into lift (L) - drag (D) components or normal (N) - tangential (T) components. The forces are considered to be acting at the quarter-chord point, and the pitching moment is determined to resolve the aerodynamic forces. The aeronautical terms lift and drag refer to the forces across (lift) and along (drag) the approaching net relative airflow. The tangential force acts along the blade's velocity, pulling the blade around, and the normal force acts radially, pushing against the shaft bearings. The lift and the drag force are useful when dealing with the aerodynamic forces around the blade such as dynamic stall, boundary layer etc.; while when dealing with global performance, fatigue loads, etc., it is more convenient to have a normal-tangential frame. The lift and the drag coefficients are usually normalised by the dynamic pressure of the relative airflow, while the dynamic pressure of the undisturbed upstream fluid velocity usually normalises the normal and tangential coefficients.

$$C_{L}=\frac{F_L}{{1}/{2}\;\rho AW^{2}}\text{     };\text{     }C_{D}=\frac{D}{{1}/{2}\;\rho AW^{2}}\text{      };\text{      }C_{T}=\frac{T}{{1}/{2}\;\rho AU^{2}R}\text{      };\text{     }C_{N}=\frac{N}{{1}/{2}\;\rho AU^{2}}$$

A = Blade Area (not to be confused with the Swept Area, which is equal to the height of the blade/rotor times the rotor diameter), R = Radius of turbine

The amount of power, P, that can be absorbed by a wind turbine:

$$P=\frac{1}{2}C_{p}\rho A\nu^{3}$$

Where $C_{p}$ is the power coefficient, $\rho$ is air density, $A$ is the swept area of the turbine, and $\nu$ is the wind speed.

== Types ==
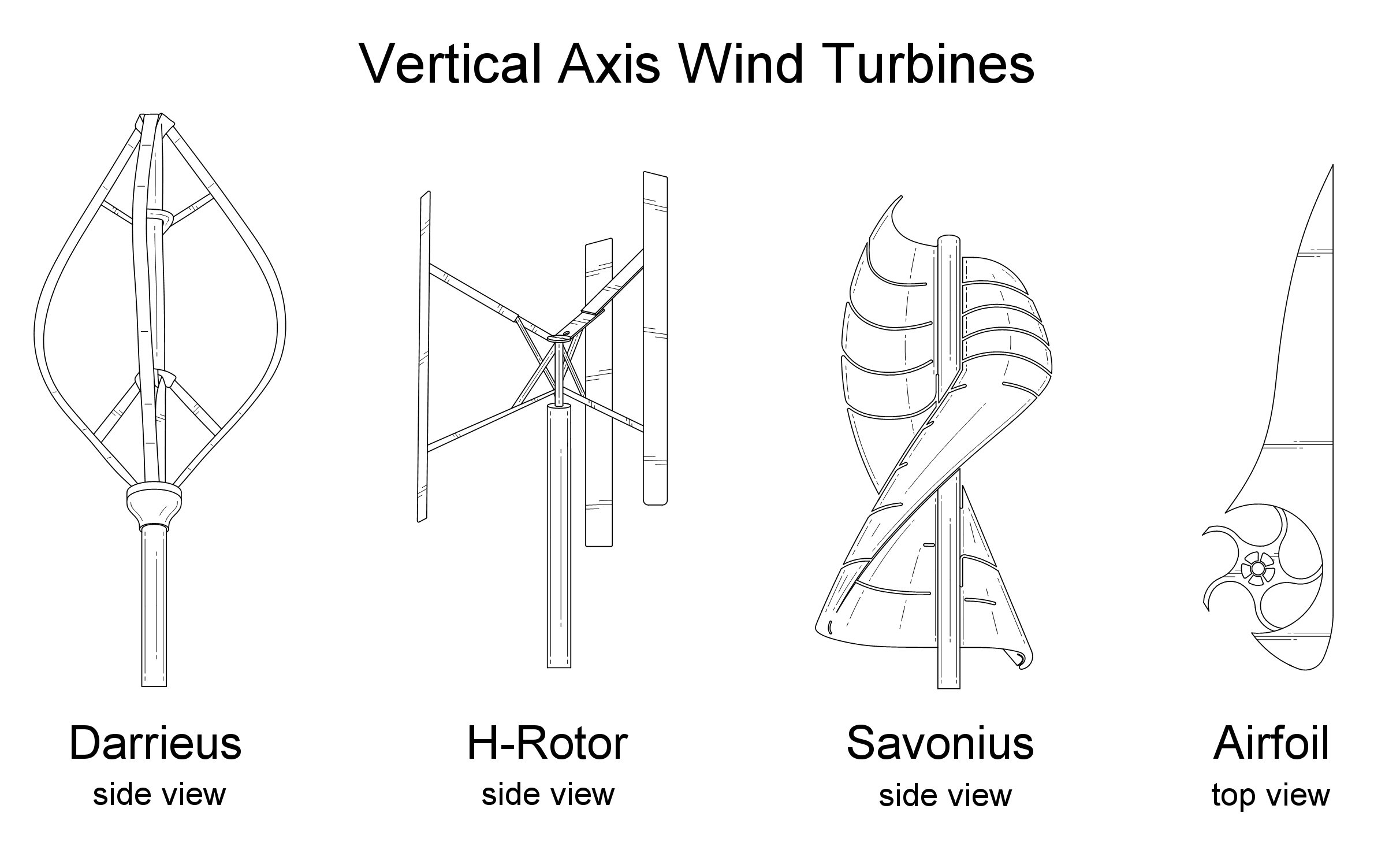
Comparison of different styles of vertical axis wind turbines

There are two main types of Vertical Axis Wind Turbines. I.e. Savonius Wind turbine and Darrieus wind turbine. The Darrieus rotor comes in various subforms, including helix-shaped, disc-like, and the H-rotor with straight blades. These turbines typically have three slim rotor blades driven by lift forces, allowing them to achieve high speeds.

Various simple designs may exist for vertical wind turbines, as detailed below. In practice, you may come across a range of variations and combinations, with developers frequently demonstrating their creativity in crafting diverse forms of vertical wind turbines.

=== Savonius ===
Schematic drawing of a two-scoop Savonius turbine

The Savonius wind turbine (SWT) is a drag-type VAWT. The common design includes a rotating shaft with two or three scoops that catch the incoming wind. Due to its simplistic and robust design and its relatively low efficiency, it is used whenever reliability is more important than efficiency. One reason for the low efficiency of a Savonius wind turbine is that roughly only half of the turbine generates positive torque, while the other side moves against the wind and thus produces negative torque. A variant of SWT is the Harmony wind turbine with helix-shaped blades and an automatic furling mechanism during high-speed wind conditions.

=== Darrieus ===
The Darrieus wind turbine is a lift-type VAWT. The original design included a number of curved aerofoil blades with the tips attached on a rotating shaft. However, there are also designs that use straight vertical airfoils, referred to as H-rotor or Giromill Darrieus wind turbines. Furthermore, the blades of the Darrieus wind turbine can be shaped into a helix to reduce the torque ripple effect on the turbine by spreading the torque evenly over the revolution.

A helical Darrieus turbine

Being lift-type devices, the Darrieus wind turbines can extract more power from the wind than drag-type wind turbines, such as the Savonius wind turbine.

=== Revolving wing ===
Revolving wing wind turbines or rotating wing wind turbines are a new category of lift-type VAWTs which use 1 vertically standing, non-helical airfoil to generate 360-degree rotation around a vertical shaft that runs through the center of the airfoil.

=== Airfoil ===
The Airfoil generator is a new type of vertical axis wind generator. The rotor is made up of a number of helical blades attached longitudinally to a central axis similar to a Savonius wind turbine. This rotor is then set within an airfoil that uses Bernoulli's principle to increase the velocity of the wind before the energy is extracted from it, allowing it to produce more power at all wind speeds. The addition of the airfoil doubles the wind's velocity, increasing the power available by a factor of eight. The airfoil also provides shrouding of the blades from the drag that other VAWT designs experience while the blades are on the return/upwind part of their rotation (see illustration). Because of this reduction in drag, the net energy produced by an Airfoil generator can be greater than other unshrouded designs.

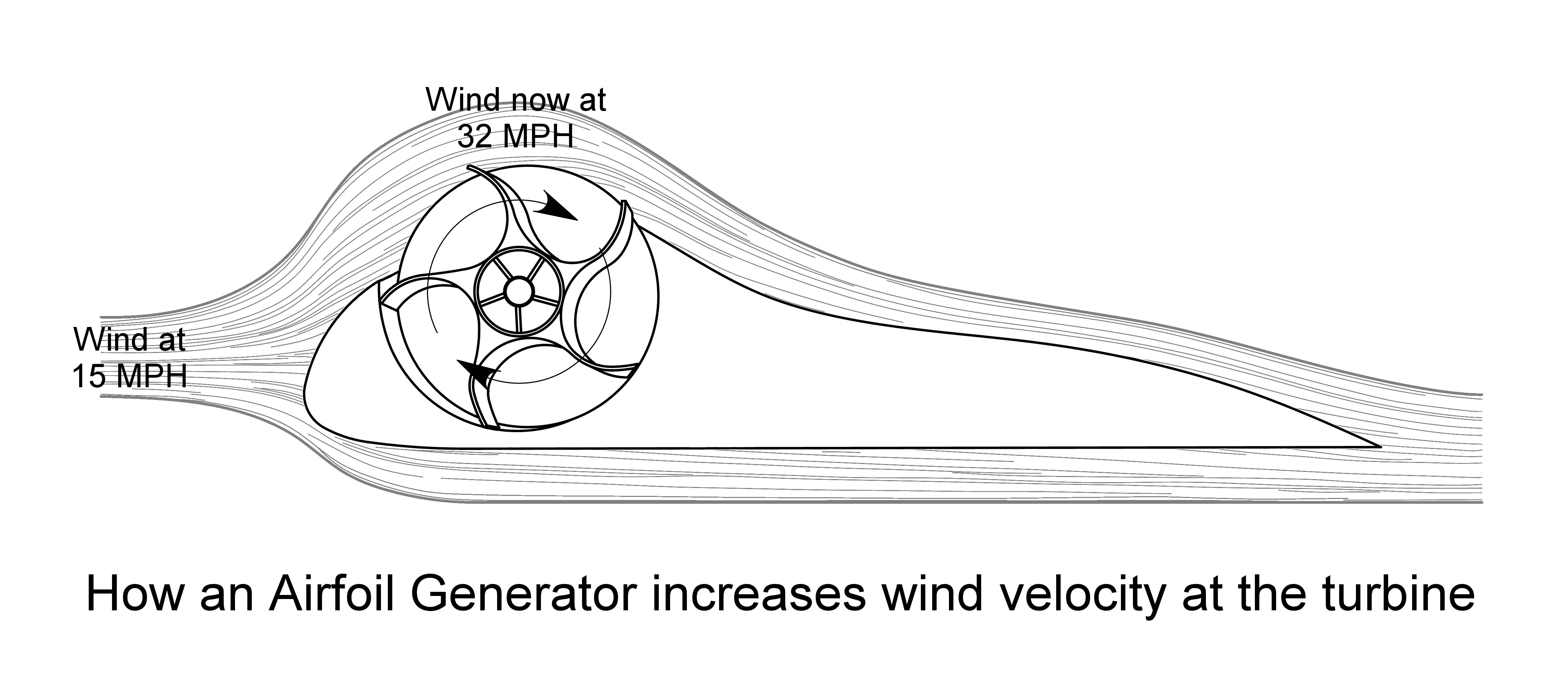

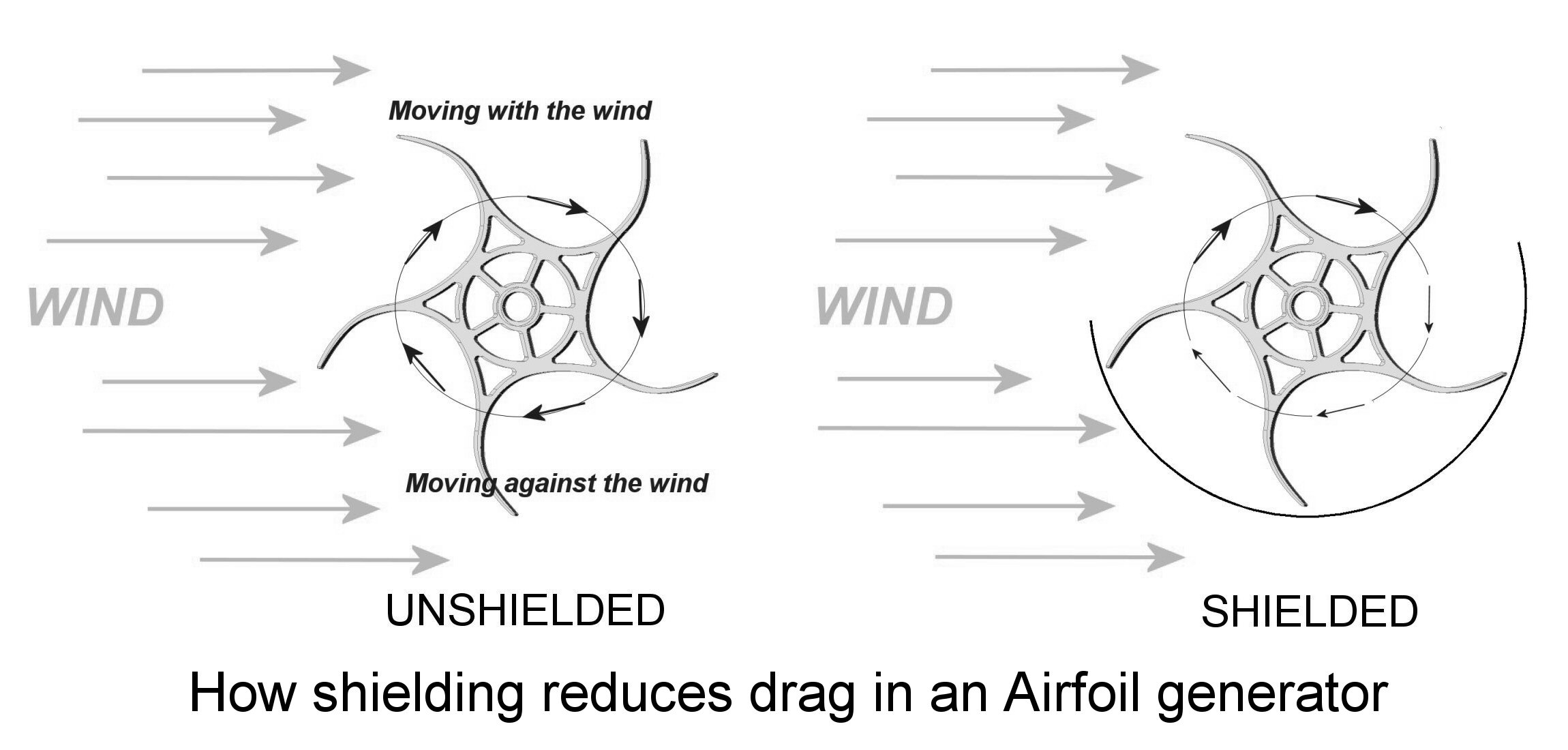

== Advantages ==
VAWTs offer a number of advantages over traditional horizontal-axis wind turbines (HAWTs):

- Omni-directional VAWTs may not need to track the wind. This means they do not require a complex mechanism and motors to yaw the rotor and pitch the blades.
- Gearbox replacement and maintenance are simpler and more efficient, because the gearbox is accessible at ground level instead of requiring the operator work hundreds of feet in the air. Motor and gearbox failures generally are significant operation and maintenance considerations.
- Some designs can use screw pile foundations, which reduces the road transport of concrete and the environmental impact of installation. Screw piles can be fully recycled at end of life.
- VAWTs can be installed on HAWT wind farms below the existing HAWTs, supplementing power output.
- VAWTs may operate in conditions unsuitable for HAWTs. For example, the Savonius rotor, which can operate in irregular, slow wind ground-level contexts, is often used in remote or unattended locations although it is the most 'inefficient', drag-type, VAWT.
- Reduced noise compared to HAWTs
- Reduced danger for birds

== Disadvantages ==
Some types of VAWTs suffer from dynamic stall of the blades as the angle of attack varies rapidly.

The blades of a Darrieus-type VAWT are fatigue-prone due to the wide variation in applied forces during each rotation. The vertically oriented blades can twist and bend during each turn, shortening their usable lifetimes. Flexing of the blades is less of a problem with Airfoil and Savonius types, where the blades are supported along their entire length.

Lift-type VAWTs have proven less reliable than HAWTs, although modern designs have overcome many early issues.

== Research ==
A 2021 study simulated a VAWT configuration that allowed VAWTs to beat a comparable HAWT installation by 15%. An 11,500-hour simulation demonstrated the increased efficiency, in part by using a grid formation. One effect is to avoid downstream turbulence stemming from grid-arranged HAWTs that lowers efficiency. Other optimizations included array angle, rotation direction, turbine spacing, and number of rotors.

In 2022 Norway's World Wide Wind introduced floating VAWTs with two sets of counter-rotating blades. The two sets are fixed to concentric shafts. Each has an attached turbine. One is attached to the rotor, the other to the stator. This has the effect of doubling their speed relative to each other versus a static stator. They claimed to more than double the output compared to the largest HAWTs. HAWTs require heavy drivetrains, gearboxes, generators and blades at the top of the tower, necessitating heavy underwater counterbalances. VAWTs place most of the heavy components at the bottom of the tower, reducing the need for counterbalance. The blades sweep a conical area, which helps reduce the turbulence downwind of each tower, increasing the maximum tower density. The company claims it will build a 400 m (1,300 ft) 40-megawatt unit.

In 2024 a study of the Airfoil generator design was conducted by the NREL. As a result, a strategic partnership was formed between three Midwestern corporations to build the first full-scale prototype of an Airfoil Generator. Construction will continue through 2026, with the first operation scheduled for September 2027.

== Applications ==
Light pole wind turbine

The Windspire, a small VAWT intended for individual (home or office) use was developed in the early 2000s by US company Mariah Power. The company reported that several units had been installed across the US by June 2008.

Arborwind, an Ann Arbor, Michigan, based company, produces a patented small VAWT which has been installed at several US locations as of 2013.

In 2011, Sandia National Laboratories wind-energy researchers began a five-year study of applying VAWT design technology to offshore wind farms. The researchers stated: "The economics of offshore wind power are different from land-based turbines, due to installation and operational challenges. VAWTs offer three big advantages that could reduce the cost of wind energy: a lower turbine center of gravity; reduced machine complexity; and better scalability to very large sizes. A lower center of gravity means improved stability afloat and lower gravitational fatigue loads. Additionally, the drivetrain on a VAWT is at or near the surface, potentially making maintenance easier and less time-consuming. Fewer parts, lower fatigue loads and simpler maintenance all lead to reduced maintenance costs."

A 24-unit VAWT demonstration plot was installed in southern California in the early 2010s by Caltech aeronautical professor John Dabiri. His design was incorporated in a 10-unit generating farm installed in 2013 in the Alaskan village of Igiugig.

Dulas, Anglesey, received permission in March 2014 to install a prototype VAWT on the breakwater at Port Talbot waterside. The turbine is a new design, supplied by Wales-based C-FEC (Swansea), and will be operated for a two-year trial. This VAWT incorporates a wind shield which blocks the wind from the advancing blades, and thus requires a wind-direction sensor and a positioning mechanism, as opposed to the "egg-beater" types of VAWTs discussed above.

StrongWind, a Canadian based company, produces a patented urban VAWT which has been installed in several Canadian and international locations as of 2023.

Architect Michael Reynolds (known for his Earthship house designs) developed a 4th-generation VAWT named Dynasphere. It has two 1.5 kW generators and can produce electricity at very low speeds.

== See also ==
- Unconventional wind turbines
- Cross-flow fan
