= Enessere =

ENESSERE
- Industry: Renewable Energy Solutions
- Founded: 2009
- Headquarters: Brendola close to Vicenza, Italy
- Area served: Worldwide
- Key people: Alberto Tessaro, Founder; Oliver Glemser, International Business Development
- Products: Small wind turbines
- Website: www.enessere.com

ENESSERE is an Italian company, founded in 2009, with headquarters in Brendola and a manufacturer of small vertical wind turbines. Its foundation and the development of the Hercules wind turbine is a response to the Environmental impact of wind power, namely to the aesthetic concerns. Hercules was launched in 2015 as a piece of Design with wooden wings and applying the Golden Ratio. ENESSERE is one of the 100 energy stories that Italy provided to the 2015 United Nations Climate Change Conference in Paris in December 2015.
