= Tip-speed ratio =

Measurement used for wind turbines

The tip-speed ratio, λ, or TSR for wind turbines is the ratio between the tangential speed of the tip of a blade and the actual speed of the wind, v. The tip-speed ratio is related to efficiency, with the optimum varying with blade design. Higher tip speeds result in higher noise levels and require stronger blades due to larger centrifugal forces.

$$\lambda = \frac{\mbox{tip speed of the blade}}{\mbox{wind speed}}$$

The tip speed of the blade can be calculated as $\omega \cdot R$, where $\omega$ is the rotational speed of the rotor and R is the rotor radius. Therefore, we can also write:

$$\lambda = \frac{\omega R}{v},$$

where $v$ is the wind speed at the height of the blade hub.

== C_{p}–λ curves ==
The power coefficient, $C_p$, expresses what fraction of the power in the wind is being extracted by the wind turbine. It is generally assumed to be a function of both tip-speed ratio and pitch angle. Below is a plot of the variation of the power coefficient with variations in the tip-speed ratio when the pitch is held constant:

=== The case for variable speed wind turbines ===
Originally, wind turbines were fixed speed. This has the benefit that the rotor speed in the generator is constant, so that the frequency of the AC voltage is fixed. This allows the wind turbine to be directly connected to a transmission system. However, from the figure above, we can see that the power coefficient is a function of the tip-speed ratio. By extension, the efficiency of the wind turbine is a function of the tip-speed ratio.

Ideally, one would like to have a turbine operating at the maximum value of C_{p} at all wind speeds. This means that as the wind speed changes, the rotor speed must change as well such that C_{p} = C_{p max}. A wind turbine with a variable rotor speed is called a variable-speed wind turbine. Whilst this does mean that the wind turbine operates at or close to C_{p max} for a range of wind speeds, the frequency of the AC voltage generator will not be constant. This can be seen in the equation

$N = \frac{120f}{P},$

where N is the rotor's angular speed, f is the frequency of the AC voltage generated in the stator windings, and P is the number of poles in the generator inside the nacelle. Therefore, direct connection to a transmission system for a variable speed is not permissible. What is required is a power converter which converts the signal generated by the turbine generator into DC and then converts that signal to an AC signal with the grid/transmission system frequency.

=== The case against variable speed wind turbines ===
Variable-speed wind turbines cannot be directly connected to a transmission system. One of the drawbacks of this is that the inertia of the transmission system is reduced as more variable-speed wind turbines are put online. This can result in more significant drops in the transmission system's voltage frequency in the event of the loss of a generating unit. Furthermore, variable-speed wind turbines require power electronics, which increases the complexity of the turbine and introduces new sources of failure. On the other hand, it has been suggested that additional energy capture achieved by comparing a variable-speed wind turbine to a fixed speed wind turbine is approximately 2%.
