= Fighting at Fréteval =

- Part of Franco-Prussian War
Date	December 14 – 15, 1870
Location	Fréteval, Loir-et-Cher, France
Result	Inconclusive, French retreat

Belligerents
French Republic	North German Confederation: Prussia

Commanders and leaders
Antoine Chanzy	Friedrich Franz II

The Fighting in Fréteval was a battle in the Franco-Prussian War, it occurred in December 14 — 15, 1870, near the village of Fréteval of France. In this fierce engagement, a corps of the Prussian army under the command of Friedrich Franz II, Grand Duke of Mecklenburg-Schwerin contested Fréteval with a force of the French army 's Loire Corps under General Antoine Chanzy, but neither side was able to seize the advantage. The battle demonstrated the effective combat capabilities of Chanzy's forces, with a huge numerical superiority over Mecklenburg's forces. From 15 December, however, Mecklenburg's army was reinforced on the left, and in light of that situation Chanzy finally made a retreat to Le Mans.

== Background ==
On December 11, 1870, with a dramatic failure for several days with the Prussian Army by Grand Duke Origin Mecklenburg in the Battle of Beaugency, Chanzy began conducting a deplete. On 12 December, upon learning that Chanzy was beginning to withdraw to the northwest, the Germans launched a pursuit. But, Chanzy deceived the Germans: they thought he would run to Tours, but in fact he pulled his troops to a position stronger than the one he had left, on the direct route to Tours and Paris. There, he can receive reinforcements from the west. Chanzy's troops withdrew under difficult circumstances, and suffered heavy losses in their rearguards. However, due to the caution of the German cavalry, the French reached their new defensive positions on the Loir, both from the Vendôme, on 13 December 1870. And, on December 14: Mecklenburg's army approached the French, who were stationed at an important position on the outskirts of the small town of Fréteval. This location is on the west bank of the River Loir. There was forest near Fréteval to the back and left, the forest of Marchenoir to the right, and the River Loir to the background. The French also set up artillery batteries in favorable positions, and deployed many snipers in the forest. German and French troops seized the hills from either side, and fired at each other across the valley.

== The Battle ==
Fighting broke out shortly after six o'clock in the afternoon on December 14, 1870, when a German major, who had been informed by some prisoners that the area had been abandoned, led a detachment of dragon cavalry into Fréteval was suddenly bombarded and forced to withdraw. Shortly after, the scale of the battle was expanded. In that day, with two great team, the Germans invaded Fréteval after a skirmish with bayonets, but could not keep the village due to unfavorable positioning. Nightfall ended the fighting, and neither side gained absolute superiority. The next day on December 15, the Germans and French continued to wage war, but were unable to achieve a decisive victory. Mecklenburg found it difficult to drive the Army of the Loire further from Paris, and the situation showed that the French position at Fréteval was too strong to be captured. But, fortunately for the Imperial German army, they didn't have to. After the fall of Blois on December 13, the X Army of the Second Army of the Kingdom of Prussia, commanded by Prince Friedrich Karl, attacked Vendôme and won in the Battle of Vendôme on December 16. The German III Corps also arrived on the left flank of the French and began to pressure them on December 15. The defeat at Vendôme forced the French to withdraw from their defensive positions. With the retreat of the French, the German army has set up a battle line extending from Cloyes and Morée in the north, through the Vendôme, to Blois southeast. Meanwhile, the French army made a retreat to Le Mans, giving up all hope of supporting Tours.
