= Unconventional wind turbines =

Wind turbines of unconventional design

Light pole wind turbine

Unconventional wind turbines are those that differ significantly from the most common types in use.

As of 2024, the most common type of wind turbine is the three-bladed upwind horizontal-axis wind turbine (HAWT), where the turbine rotor is at the front of the nacelle and facing the wind upstream of its supporting turbine tower. A second major unit type is the vertical-axis wind turbine (VAWT), with blades extending upwards, supported by a rotating framework.

Due to the large growth of the wind power industry, many wind turbine designs exist, are in development, or have been proposed. The variety of designs reflects ongoing commercial, technological, and inventive interests in harvesting wind resources more efficiently and in greater volume.

Some unconventional designs have entered commercial use, while others have only been demonstrated or are only theoretical concepts. Unconventional designs cover a wide gamut of innovations, including different rotor types, basic functionalities, supporting structures and form-factors.

There exist also conventional wind turbines with unconventional constructive details, see List of wind turbines with special constructive features.

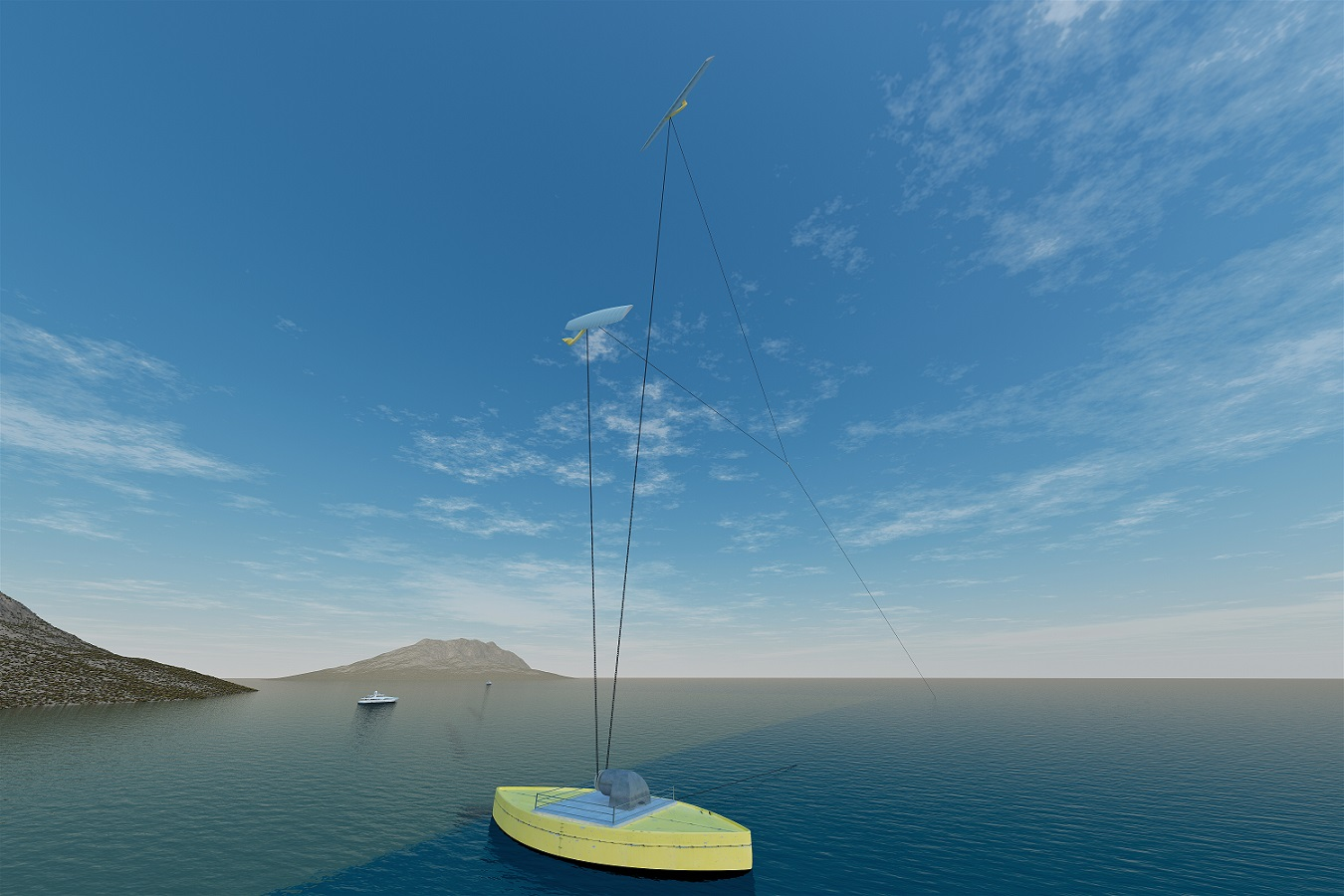
Crosswind kite generator with fast motion transfer

== Horizontal axis ==
=== Twin-bladed rotor ===
Nearly all modern wind turbines use rotors with three blades, but some use only two blades. This was the type used at Kaiser-Wilhelm-Koog, Germany, where a large experimental two-bladed unit—the GROWIAN, or Große Windkraftanlage (big wind turbine)—operated from 1983 to 1987. Other prototypes and wind turbine types were manufactured by NedWind. The Eemmeerdijk Wind Park in Zeewolde, Netherlands uses only two-bladed turbines. Wind turbines with two blades are manufactured by Windflow Technology, Mingyang Wind Power, GC China Turbine Corp and Nordic Windpower. The NASA wind turbines (1975–1996) each had 2-blade rotors, producing the same energy at lower cost than three-blade rotor designs.

=== Downwind rotor ===
Nearly all wind turbines place the rotor in front of the nacelle when the wind is blowing (upwind design). Some turbines place the rotor behind the nacelle (downwind design). This design has the advantage that the turbine can be made to passively align itself with the wind, reducing cost. The main drawback is that the load on the blades changes as they pass behind the tower, increasing fatigue loading, and potentially exciting resonances in other turbine structures.

=== Ducted rotor ===
A research project, the ducted rotor consists of a turbine inside a duct that flares at the back. They are also referred as Diffuser-Augmented Wind Turbines (i.e. DAWT). Its main advantage is that it can operate in a wide range of winds and generate a higher power per unit of rotor area. Another advantage is that the generator operates at a high rotation rate, so it doesn't require a bulky gearbox, allowing the mechanical portion to be smaller and lighter. A disadvantage is that (apart from the gearbox) it is more complicated than the unducted rotor and the duct's weight increases tower weight. The Éolienne Bollée is an example of a DAWT.

=== Co-axial, multi-rotor ===
Two or more rotors may be mounted to a single driveshaft, with their combined co-rotation together turning the same generator: fresh wind is brought to each rotor by sufficient spacing between rotors combined with an offset angle (alpha) from the wind direction. Wake vorticity is recovered as the top of a wake hits the bottom of the next rotor. Power was multiplied several times using co-axial, multiple rotors in testing conducted by inventor and researcher Douglas Selsam in 2004. The first commercially available co-axial multi-rotor turbine is the patented dual-rotor American Twin Superturbine from Selsam Innovations in California, with two rotors separated by twelve feet (3.7 m). It is the most powerful seven-foot-diameter (2.1 m) turbine available, due to this extra rotor. In 2015, Iowa State University aerospace engineers Hui Hu and Anupam Sharma were optimizing designs of multi-rotor systems, including a horizontal-axis co-axial dual-rotor model. In addition to a conventional three-blade rotor, it has a smaller secondary three-blade rotor, covering the near-axis region usually inefficiently harvested. Preliminary results indicated 10–20% gains, less efficient than is claimed by existing counter-rotating designs.

Counter-rotating wind turbine

=== Counter-rotating horizontal-axis ===
When a system expels or accelerates mass in one direction, the accelerated mass causes a proportional but opposite force on that system. The spinning blade of a single-rotor wind turbine causes a significant amount of tangential, or rotational, air flow. The energy of this tangential air flow is wasted in a single-rotor turbine design. To use this wasted effort, the placement of a second rotor behind the first takes advantage of the disturbed airflow, and can gain up to 40% more energy from a given swept area as compared with a single rotor. Other advantages of contra-rotation include no gear boxes and auto-centering on the wind (no yaw motors/mechanism required). A patent application dated 1992 exists based on work done with the Trimblemill.

When the counter-rotating turbines are on the same side of the tower, the blades in front are angled forwards slightly so as to avoid hitting the rear ones. If the turbine blades are on opposite sides of the tower, it is best that the blades at the back be smaller than the blades at the front and set to stall at a higher wind speed. This allows the generator to function at a wider wind speed range than a single-turbine generator for a given tower. To reduce sympathetic vibrations, the two turbines should turn at speeds with few common multiples, for example 7:3 speed ratio.

When land or sea area for a second wind turbine does not come at a premium the 40% gain with a second rotor has to be compared with a 100% gain via the expense of a separate foundation and tower with cabling for the second turbine. The overall power coefficient of a Counter-rotating horizontal-axis wind turbine may depend by the axial and the radial shift of the rotors and by the rotors' size. As of 2005, no large, counter-rotating HAWTs are commercially sold.

=== Furling tail and twisting blades ===
In addition to variable pitch blades, furling tails and twisting blades are other improvements on wind turbines. Similar to the variable pitch blades, they may also greatly increase efficiency and be used in "do-it-yourself" construction.

=== Wind-mill style ===
De Nolet is a wind turbine in Schiedam disguised as a windmill.

=== Archimedean screw ===
Instead of airplane-inspired wing blades, the design takes after the Archimedean screw turbine, a helix-patterned pipe used in ancient Greece to pump water up from a deeper source.

== Bladeless ==
=== Boundary layer ===
The boundary-layer turbine, or Tesla turbine, uses boundary layers instead of blades.

One modern version is the Fuller turbine. The concept is similar to a stack of disks on a central shaft, separated by a small air gap. The surface tension of air in the small gaps creates friction, rotating the disks around the shaft. Vanes direct the air for improved performance, hence it is not strictly bladeless.

=== Vaneless ion wind generator ===
A vaneless ion wind generator is a theoretical device that produces electrical energy by using the wind to move electric charge from one electrode to another.

=== Piezoelectric ===
Piezoelectric wind turbines work by flexing piezoelectric crystals as they rotate, sufficient to power small electronic devices. They operate with diameters on the scale of 10 centimeters.

=== Solar updraft tower ===
Wind turbines may be used in conjunction with a solar collector to extract energy from air heated by the sun and rising through a large vertical updraft tower.

=== Vortex ===
The Vortex Bladeless device maximizes vortex shedding, using the vorticity in wind to flutter a lightweight vertical pole, which delivers that energy to a generator at the bottom of the pole. The design has been criticized for its efficiency of 40%, compared to 70% for conventional designs. However, individual poles can be placed more closely together, offsetting the losses. The design avoids mechanical components, lowering costs. The system also does not threaten bird life and operates silently.

=== Saphonian ===
The Saphonian design uses an oscillating dish to drive a piston, which then connects to a generator.

=== Windbeam ===
The Windbeam generator consists of a beam suspended by springs within an outer frame. The beam oscillates rapidly when exposed to airflow due to multiple fluid flow phenomena. A linear alternator converts the beam motion. The absence of bearings and gears eliminates frictional inefficiencies and noise. Costs are low due to low cost components and simple construction.

=== Wind belt ===
Windbelt is a flexible, tensioned belt that vibrates from the passing flow of air, due to aeroelastic flutter. A magnet, mounted at one end of the belt oscillates in and out of coiled windings, producing electricity. The inventor is Shawn Frayne.

== Aerial ==
Concept for an airborne wind generator

Airborne wind turbines may operate in low or high altitudes; they are part of a wider class of airborne wind energy systems (AWES) addressed by high-altitude wind power and crosswind kite power. Wind turbines could be flown in high-speed winds using high-altitude wind power tactics, taking advantage of high altitude winds.

When the generator is on the ground, then the tethered aircraft need not carry the generator mass or have a conductive tether. When the generator is aloft, then a conductive tether would be used to transmit energy to the ground or used aloft or beamed to receivers using microwave or laser.

The principle of the kite airborne wind turbine

A possible flight path of the kite airborne wind turbine

For instance, a system of tethered kites could capture energy from high-altitude winds. Another concept uses a helium balloon with attached sails to generate pressure and drive rotation around a horizontal axis. Circular motion of ropes transfer kinetic energy to ground-based generator.

== Vertical ==
Vertical-axis wind turbines offshore

=== Gorlov ===
The Gorlov helical turbine (GHT) is a modification of the Darrieus turbine design that uses helical blades/foils.

=== Enclosed blades ===
One design uses many nylon blades to run a generator. Its permanent magnets are on the tips of the blades, while the stator is a ring outside the blades.

=== H-rotor ===
The giromill is a vertical-axis turbine that rotates one blade in one direction while another moves in the opposite direction. Consequently, only one blade is working at a time. Its efficiency is low.

=== Revolving-wing VAWT ===
Revolving-wing wind turbines, or rotating-wing wind turbines, are a category of lift-type vertical-axis wind turbines that use one vertically standing, non-helical airfoil to generate 360-degree rotation around a vertical shaft which runs through the center of the airfoil.

=== O-wind turbine ===
A omnidirectional turbine which uses the Bernoulli principle to generate energy using wind from any direction. The design is spherical with a number of ducts across the surface, a pressure difference causes the rotation. The design won the James Dyson Award 2018.

== Components ==
=== INVELOX ===
SheerWind's INVELOX technology was developed by Daryoush Allaei. A large funnel-shaped intake acts as a wind concentrator, which ends in a Venturi section. Wind exits from a diffuser; turbines are placed inside the Venturi section. Inside the Venturi, the dynamic pressure is high while the static pressure is low. The turbine converts dynamic pressure or kinetic energy to mechanical rotation and thereby to electrical power using a generator. The device has been constructed and tested, but has been criticized for lack of efficiency. As of 2017, prototypes are being installed.

== Applications ==
=== Rooftop ===
Wind-turbines can be installed on building roofs. Examples include Marthalen Landi-Silo in Switzerland, Council House 2 in Melbourne, Australia. Ridgeblade in the UK is a vertical wind turbine on its side mounted on the apex of a pitched roof. Another example installed in France is the Aeolta AeroCube. Discovery Tower is an office building in Houston, Texas, that incorporates ten wind turbines.

The Museum of Science in Boston, Massachusetts began constructing a rooftop Wind Turbine Lab in 2009. The lab is testing nine wind turbines from five different manufacturers. Rooftop wind turbines may suffer from turbulence, especially in cities, which reduces power output and accelerates turbine wear. The lab seeks to address the general lack of performance data for urban wind turbines.

Due to structural limitations of buildings, limited space in urban areas, and safety considerations, building turbines are usually small (with capacities in the low kilowatts). An exception is the Bahrain World Trade Centre with three 225 kW wind turbines mounted between twin skyscrapers.

=== Traffic-driven ===
Highway wind turbine

Proposals call for generating power from the energy in the draft created by traffic.

=== Education ===
Some installations have installed visitor centers on turbine bases, or by providing viewing areas. The wind turbines themselves are generally of conventional design, while serving the unconventional roles of technology demonstration, public relations, and education.

== See also ==
- EWICON
- Compact wind acceleration turbine
- Savonius wind turbine
- Wind lens
- Unconventional oil
- Unconventional gas
