= Fighting at Epuisay =

- Part of Franco-Prussian War
Date	17 December 1870
Location	Épuisay, Loir-et-Cher, France
Result	Bavarian Victory

Belligerents
French Republic	Bavaria

Commanders and leaders
Antoine Chanzy	Ludwig von der Tann-Rathsamhausen

Casualties and losses
230 captured	Unknown

The Fighting at Épuisay was a military conflict of the Franco-Prussian War, it took place on 17 December 1870, in Épuisay where there was a junction of roads from Vendôme and Morée to Saint-Calais. This was a battle between the rear forces of the Armée de la Loire of the French Republic under the command of Antoine Chanzy with the German army in retreat after X Legion being defeated in the Battle of Vendôme on 16 December 1870. Under the command of General Ludwig von der Tann-Rathsamhausen, the German army captured Epuisay and captured 230 prisoners.

After the engagement at Epuisay, Chanzy continued his retreat, and on 21 December his troops entered Le Mans. By this time, the Loire Legion, after a series of defeats, had fallen into disrepair. At the beginning of month January 1871, Chief of the Prussian army, Helmuth von Moltke the Elder ordered the Army of Monday which was commanded by Prince Friedrich Karl of Prussia to attack Chanzy in the Battle of Le Mans which was a catastrophic defeat for the French army.
