= Talcy =

Talcy may refer to the following places in France:

- Talcy, Loir-et-Cher, a commune in the Loir-et-Cher department, known for the Château de Talcy
- Talcy, Yonne, a commune in the Yonne department
