= Cowling =

Cover over the engine of motor vehicles or airplanes

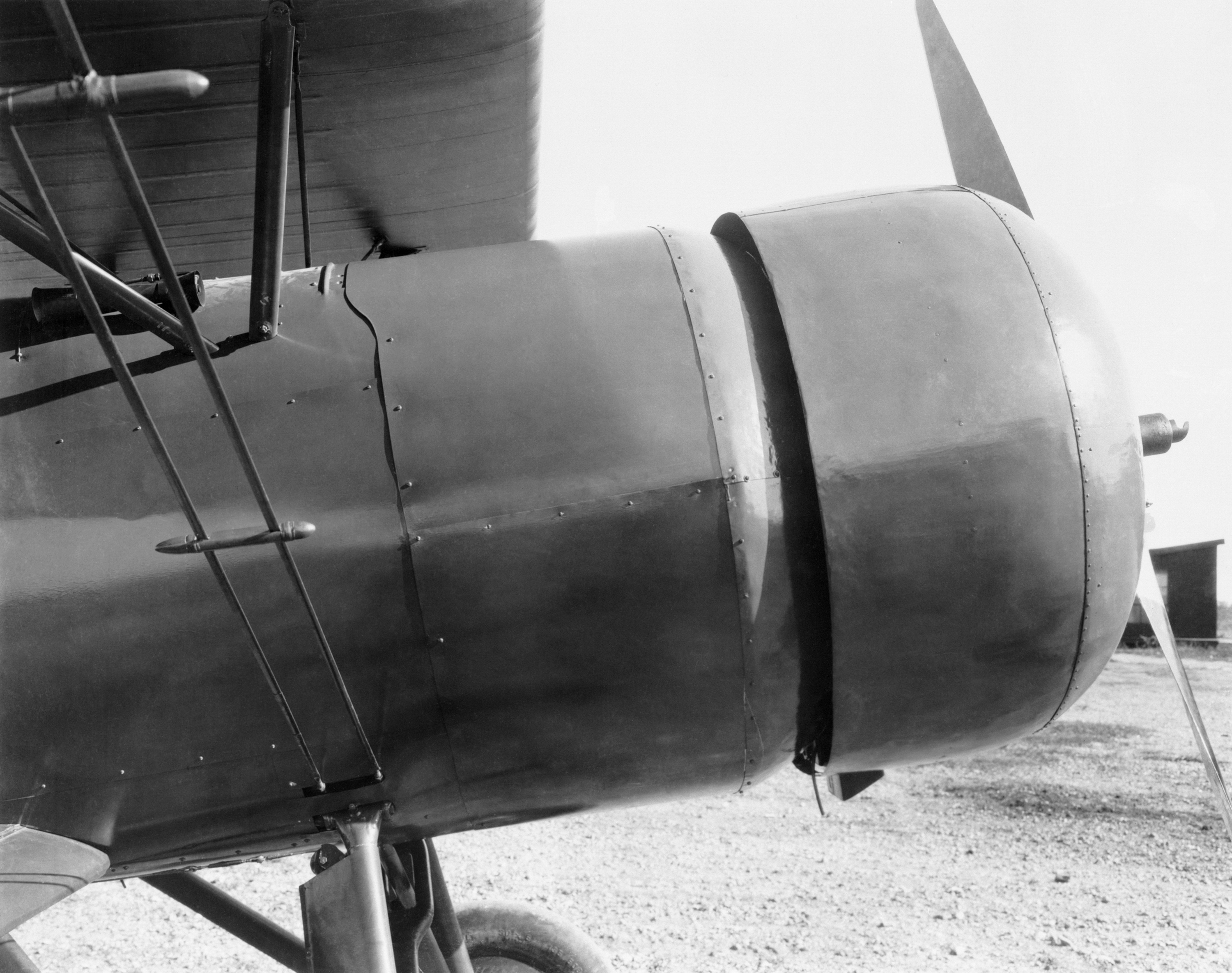
The NACA engine cowling on a Curtiss AT-5a.

A cowling (or cowl) is the removable covering of a vehicle's engine, most often found on automobiles, motorcycles, airplanes, and on outboard boat motors. On airplanes, cowlings are used to reduce drag and to cool the engine. On boats, cowlings are a cover for an outboard motor. In addition to protecting the engine, outboard motor cowlings need to admit air while keeping water out of the air intake.

== Etymology ==
"Cowling" comes from "cowl", which originated from Middle English coule, from Old English cūle, from earlier cugele (“hood, cowl”). This, in turn, came from Ecclesiastical Latin cuculla (“monk's cowl”), from Latin cucullus (“hood”), of uncertain origin.

== In aviation ==
In aviation, a cowling may be used for drag reduction or engine cooling by directing airflow. Examples in aviation include the NACA cowling and Townend ring. On an airplane, the cowling may also cover part of the fuselage, the nacelles, the engine mount and part of the cockpit. The cowlings and the fairings are similar, as both streamline airflow, except that cowlings are usually removable (to permit engine inspections and repairs), whereas fairings are bolted in place. Engine-facing sides of the cowling must be made of metal. On jets, they are used as an air intake for jet engines. Cowlings may also be used for decorative purposes.

On piston-engined planes, the cowling constitutes a symmetric, circular airfoil, in contrast to the planar airfoil of airplane wings. It directs cool air to flow through the engine where it is routed across the engine's hottest parts, that is, the cylinders and heads. Furthermore, turbulence after the air passes the free-standing cylinders is greatly reduced. The sum of all these effects reduces drag by as much as 60 percent. After tests in 1932 proved the effectiveness of NACA cowlings, almost every radial-engined aircraft were equipped with them.

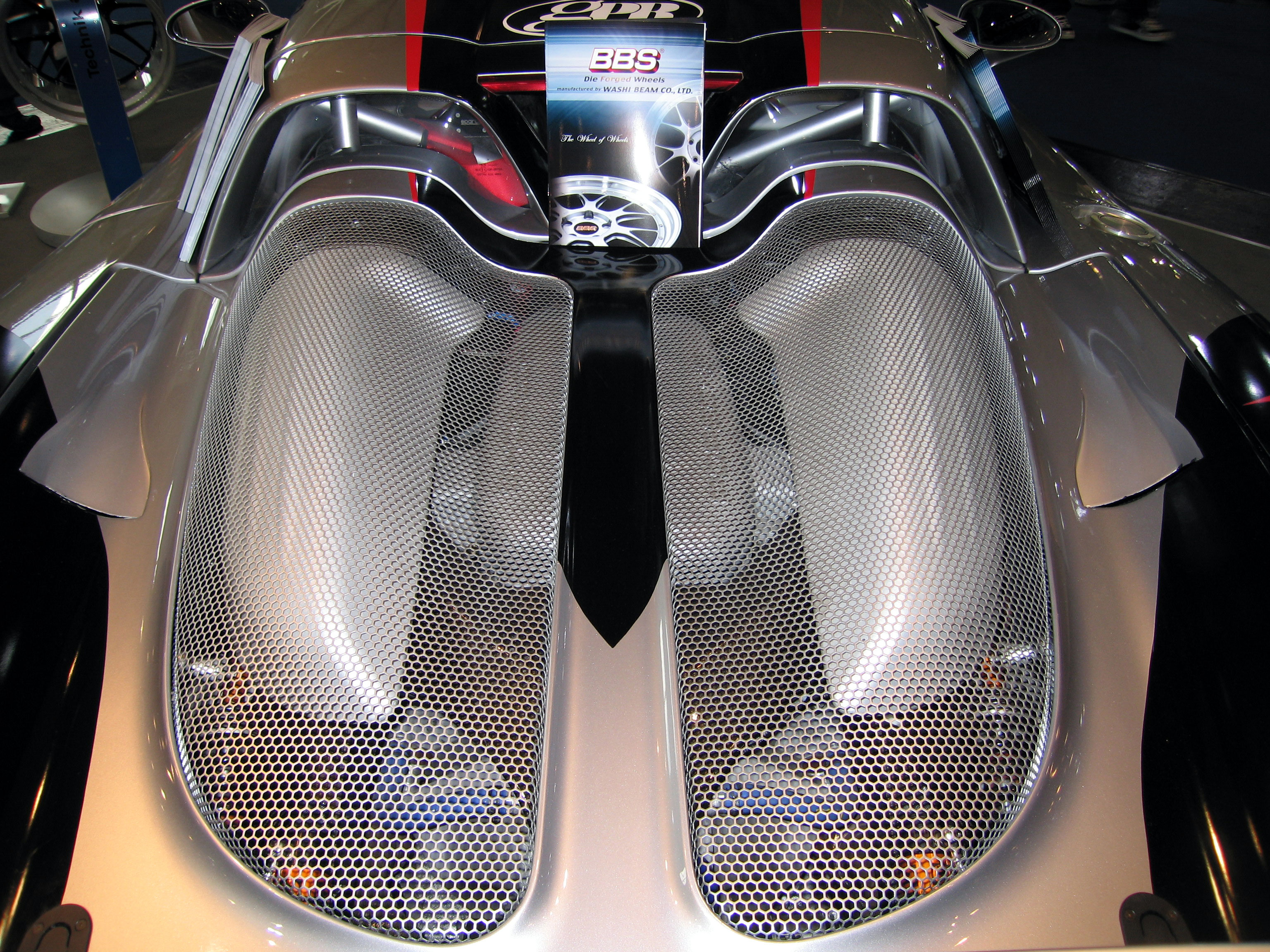
The engine cowling on a Porsche Carrera GT.

== See also ==
- Aircraft fairing
- Hood scoop
- List of auto parts
- Motorcycle fairing
- Nacelle
- Wind lens
