= Château de Talcy =

Historical building in Loir-et-Cher, France

Coordinates: 47°46′11″N 1°26′40″E

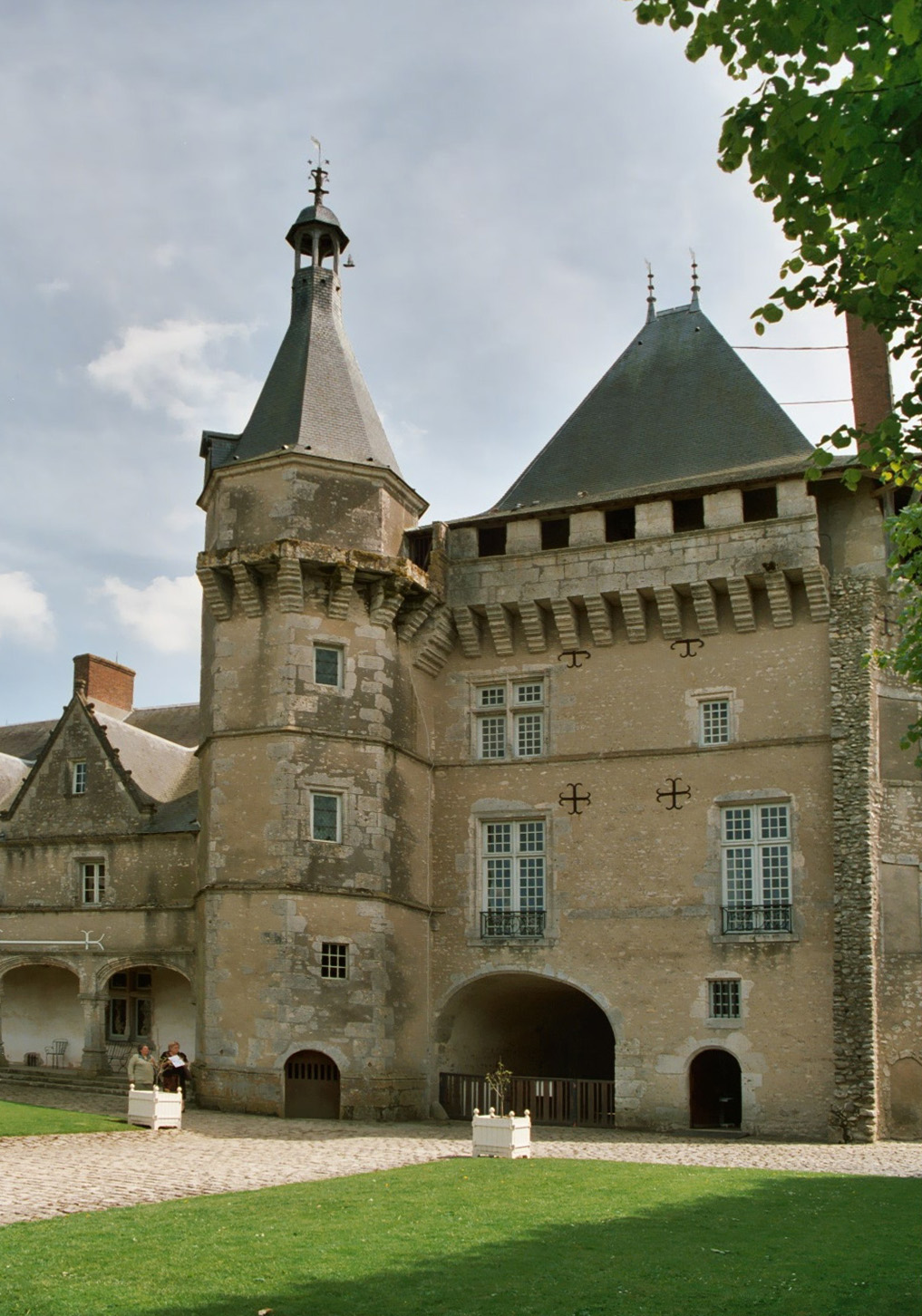
View of the court

The Château de Talcy is a historical building in Talcy, Loir-et-Cher, France. It lies to the north of the river Loire, in the Loire Valley, known for its 16th-century châteaux. From a fortification in existence in the 13th century additional wings were added in the 1620s. Modernised in the 18th century the interiors have been preserved. A Historical Monument first registered in 1906 it has been owned by the state since 1933. It is open to visitors.

== History ==
It was first referenced in an act in 1221, although no description of the building is given. The title of Seigneur de Talcy was used in reference to the St Lazare family. It was bought in 1466 by a Parisian lawyer: Pierre Simon. The central tower was built by the Simon family in 1480. Three generations of the Simon family lived there before the family line died out on the death of Jean Simon, Bishop of Paris in 1502. His sister, Marie was the final owner. The building was bought from Marie Simon in 1517 by Roberto Bernard Salviati, a Florentine banker and his wife Francoise (née Doucet). Bernard Salviati requested that the building be fortified, the request was granted in 1520 by Jean d'Orleans-Longueville, archbishop of Toulouse and Seigneur of Beaugency. However limitations were placed on Salviati as to Seigneural rights: he could not keep an armed guard. Salviati was in a difficult situation, needing to be close to king François 1, as his banker yet not a French citizen.

The estate is better known in literary, rather than architectural history. Salviati's daughter and granddaughter, Cassandre and Diane, were the muses of two leading French poets of the time, Pierre de Ronsard and Théodore-Agrippa d'Aubigné, respectively.

Ronsard fell in love with the 15-year-old Cassandre in 1545, whom he met at a ball in Blois. He dedicated to her some of the best known sonnets in the French language. They were not allowed to marry as Ronsard was not considered a suitable match. She was married to Jean III de Peigné in 1546. Diane was the daughter of Cassandra's brother Jean Salviati. D'Aubigné, dedicated to Diane in 1571 the collection of sonnets, ballads, and idylls entitled Le Printemps and at her death the finest of his poems, Les Tragiques. Due to his strong Hugonout religion and her Catholism the couple were unable to marry, her family objected most strongly.

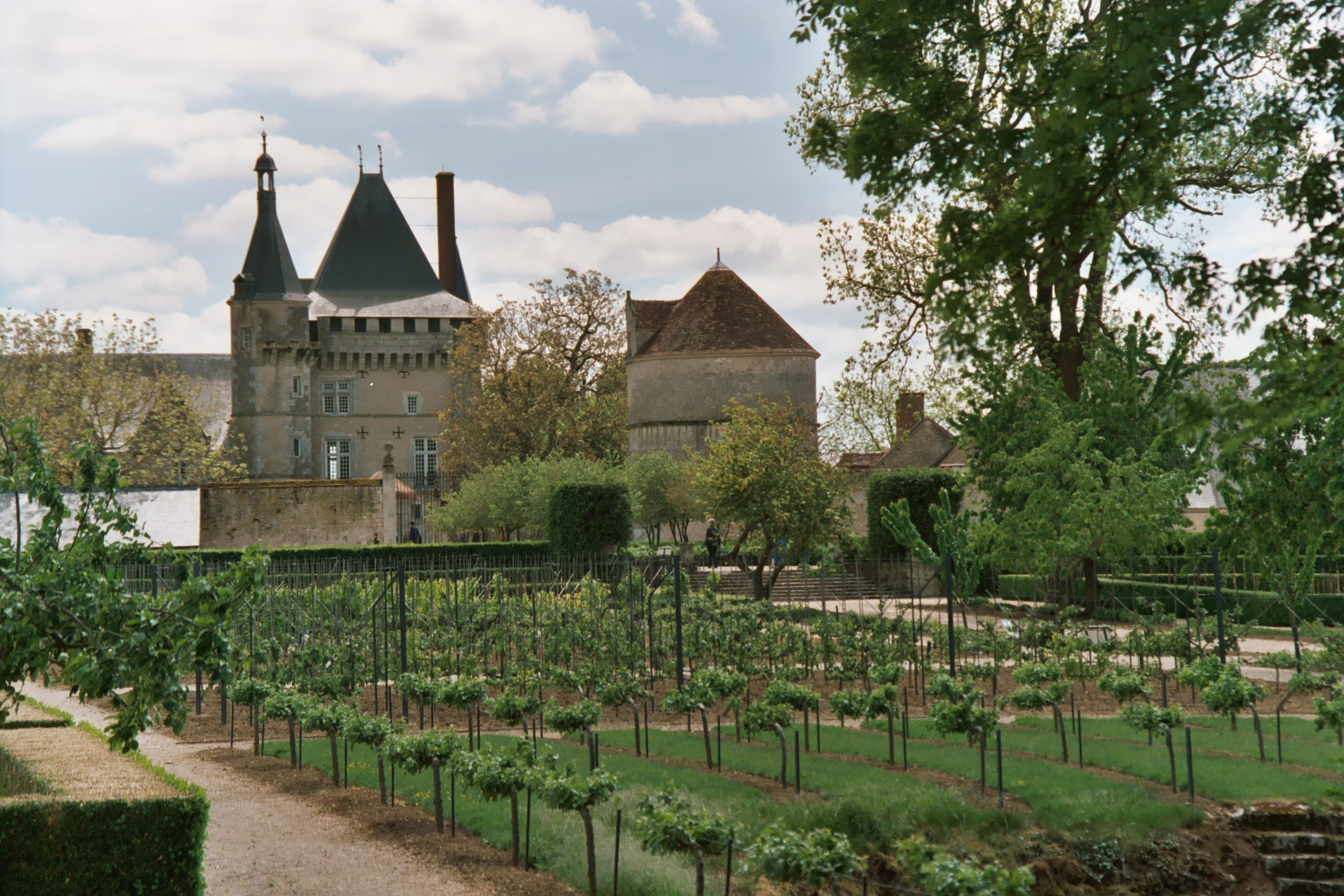
Vegetable garden

In the château is the "Chambre de la Médicis" where Catherine de' Medici and her son Charles IX are said to have planned the Massacre of Saint Bartholomew's Day during the "Conference of Talcy" 28 and 29 June 1572.

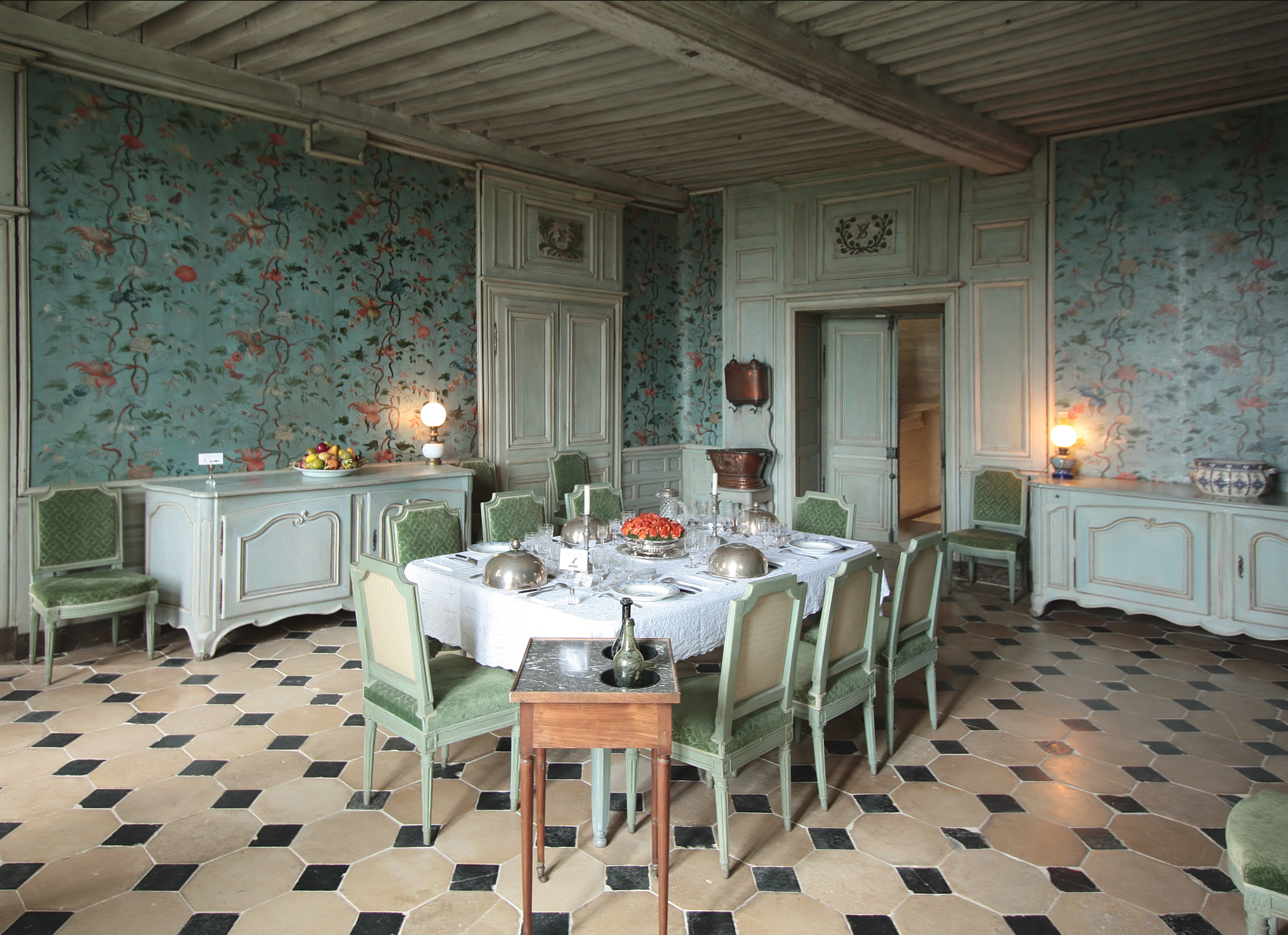
Restored dining room

Jean Salviati, Seigneur de Talcy passed the château to his son Foréze Salviati and it then passed to his daughter Isabella Salviati, who extended the east wing of the château in 1638, when the gable of the church was rebuilt. Isabella had bought the château from her mother (Isabeau née Sardini) although she was married to Louis de la Marck, with whom she had four children. There are engraved marks of YS on the doors of the tower, denoting Isabella Salviati. The Salvatie family sold the estate in 1682. Although this may have been earlier as Antoine de Preuilly was registered to have sold it to Blanchard de St. Martin in 1674. From there the house was passed down through the family and it is known that Jeremie's Burgeat had inherited it, recorded on his accent to the peerage in 1720. The Burgeat family owned the property between 1704 and 1780. They carried out extensive modernisation of the building and redeveloped the gardens. Andre Burgeat sold the château in 1780 to Elizabeth Gastebois.

The Gastebois family, from La Rochelle were a Huguenot family and Elizabeth (1758–1830) had married Francois Charles Vincens (1757–1796), the Vincens being also Huguenot. Their daughter Marie Madeleine Pierrette Vincens (1778–1854) married Philipp Albert Stapfer in 1798 and their family moved into the chateau.

The chateau remained intact throughout the revolution due to the families (Gastebois, Vincens and Stapfer) strong egalitarian beliefs. Philipp and Marie had two sons: Charles Louis (1799–1880) and (Frederic) Albert (1802–1892). Charles Louis was the father of Paul Stapfer.

Albert spent his youth as a liberal journalist for le Globe and continued to support egalitarian policies, manning the barricades in the 1830 revolution. Retiring to Talcy after his marriage to Clarey Louise Vincens in 1835, he gained an interest in daguerreotypes, taking a series of pictures of the chateau, still on view there.

During the 1870 Franco-Prussian War, Albert hosted General Antoine Chanzy there, but he was driven out by the Prussians in the Battle of Beaugency (1870) in December 1870.

Albert died there in 1892, leaving it to his three children: Leon (Protestant minister at Jones, Le Mans and Blois), Genevieve (married Raoul Debaste) and Valentine. Leon retired to Talcy in 1906 and died in 1930. In 1933 Valentine and Helene Genevieve sold it to the state, on condition that the 18th-century interiors would be preserved intact.

The château is visited by 20,000 tourists annually.

== Architecture ==
The central square tower is likely the remains of the 1480 building with dramatic fortifications that were added in the 1520s.

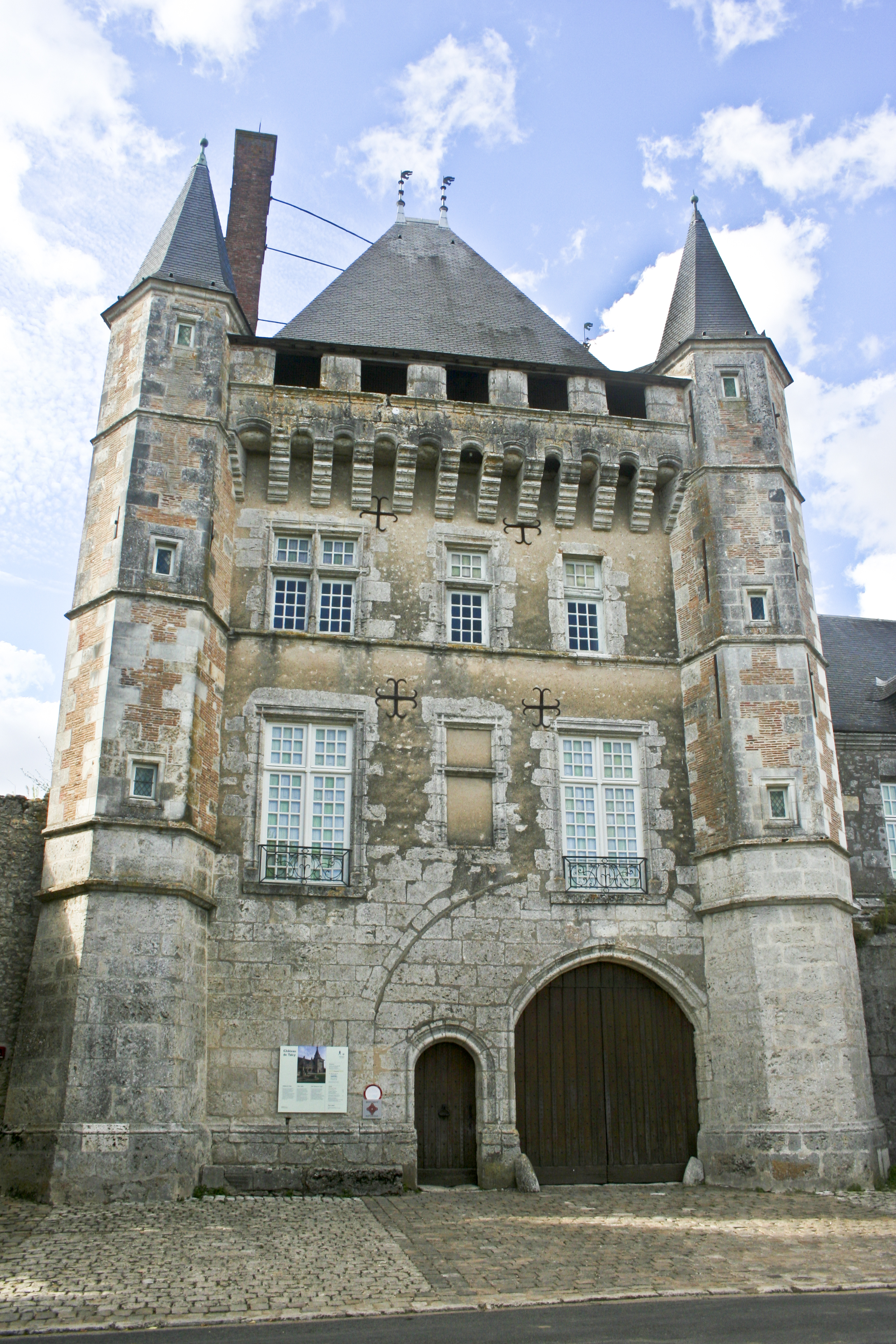
Central tower

There are no accurate records currently available as to the extent of the building at this time, but a later drawing shows two wings, on either side of the tower. The east wing also extended north to meet the church. This section was known to have been further extended in 1638 by Isabelle Salviati whilst the church was being worked on. The west wing was destroyed in a fire in 1723. The joining edge can be seen on the northwest corner of the tower. The two wings and tower enclosed the great courtyard of the chateau that contains the well. This is covered with a distinctive roof held on stone columns built in 1814 that has become emblematic of the chateau.

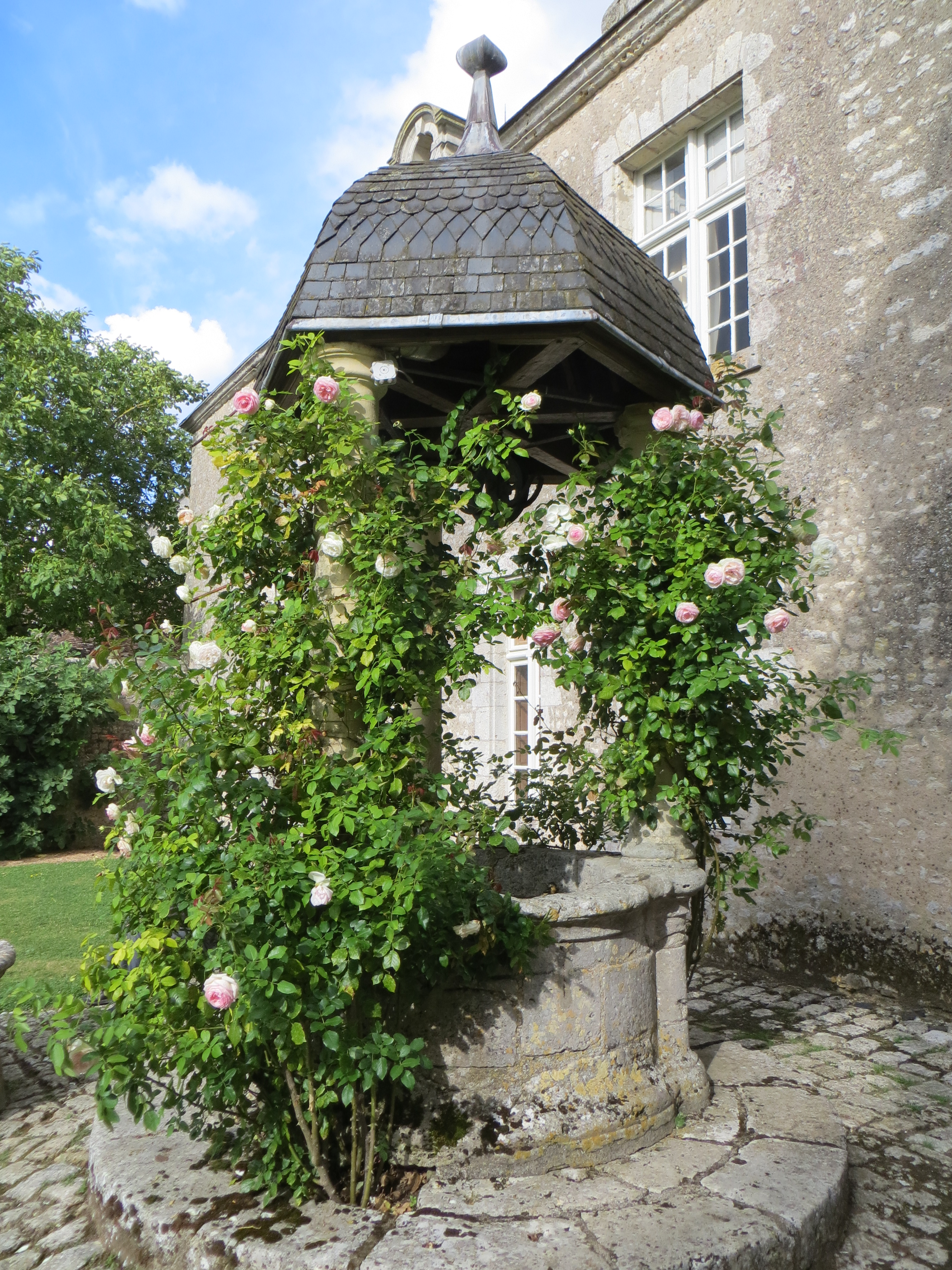
Well

From the courtyard there is a central gate that leads into a more agriculture courtyard surrounded by barns and outbuildings also containing a large circular dove cote. This has been suggested to have been part of the medieval fortifications that was later converted. One of the barns still contains a wine press from 1808.

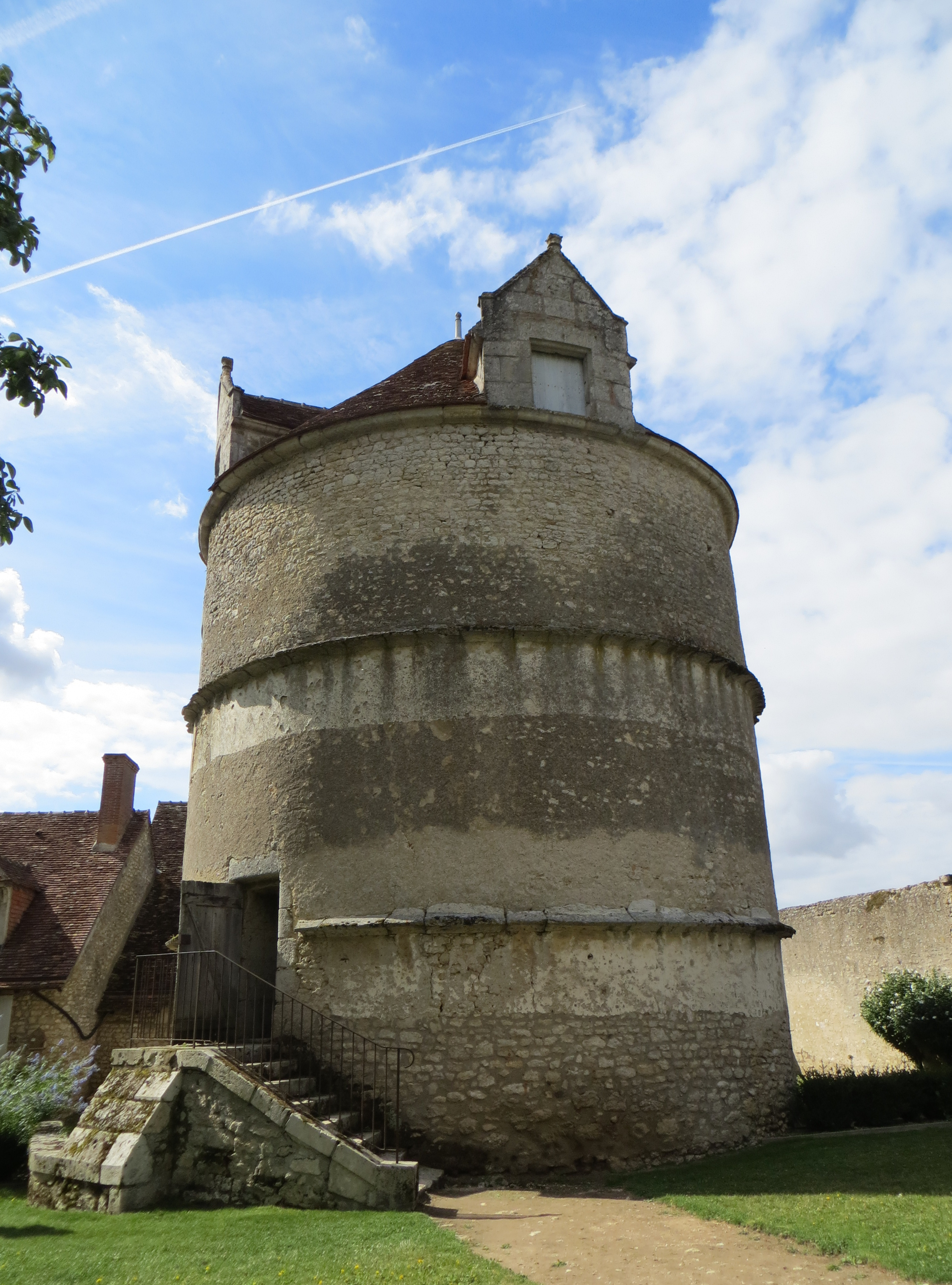
Dovecote

The 1st floor windows were enlarged and the corridors and interiors modified in the 1780s by the Burgeat family. Later residents, the Stapfer, also built in a ground-floor room a place of worship (they were a strongly Protestant family), and there is still a wooden plaque over the fireplace inscribed "Cult Evangelical Protestant".

Whilst predominantly dating from the Renaissance the building has a strongly medieval feel due to the central tower. The Salviati family did not build the wings in a heavy Renaissance manner, that was becoming very popular at the time due to their wish to play down their Italian background.

The chateau was listed in 1906, with later listings for the larger environment and sold to the state by Valentine Stapfer in 1933 on the proviso that the building and interiors remain intact. The large library collection was sold in 1931.

== Sources ==
- Robert de Laroche, Catherine Bibollet. Châteaux, parcs et jardins en vallée de la Loire. Paris: Renaissance du livre, 2003.
