= Battle of Vendôme =

1870 battle between France and Prussia

- Part of Franco-Prussian War
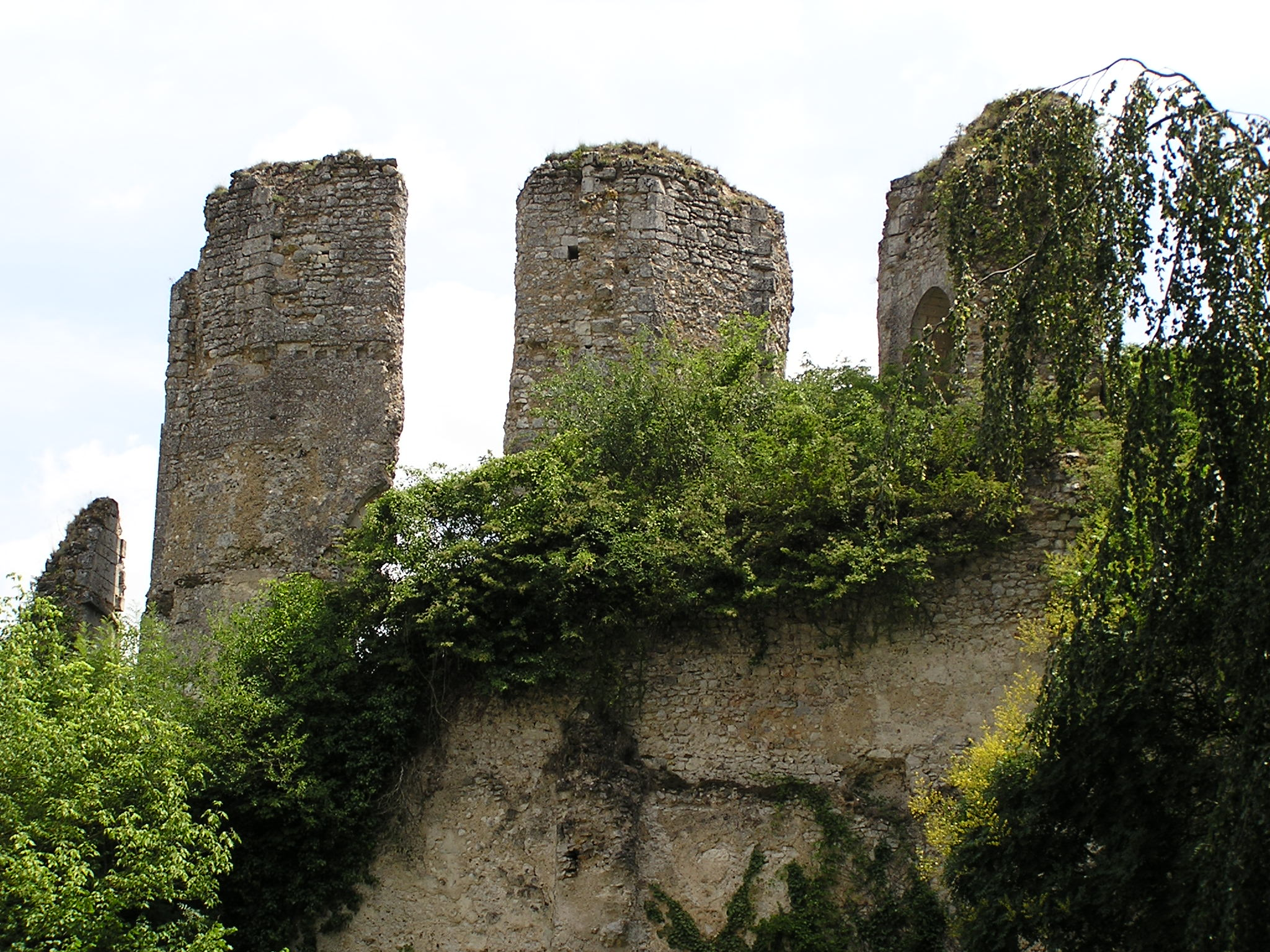
- The castle where four Artillery batteries stood
Date	14–17 December 1870
Location	Vendôme, Loir-et-Cher, France
Result	German victory

Belligerents
French Republic	North German Confederation: Prussia

Commanders and leaders
Antoine Chanzy; Bernard Jaureguiberry	Prince Friedrich Karl; Konstantin von Voigts-Rhetz

Units involved
Armée de la Loire	X Corps

Casualties and losses
6 cannons and 1 mitrailleuse machine gun captured, Unknown Captured	300 Prussian Soldiers Captured

The Battle of Vendôme took place during the Franco-Prussian War, it lasted from 14 to 17 December 1870 in Vendôme, Loir-et-Cher, France. In this fierce fighting, the X Army of the Kingdom of Prussia under the command of General Konstantin Bernhard von Voigts-Rhetz and the 2nd Army of Prussia which was commanded by Prince Friedrich Karl, attacked the French Army of the Loire by Minister Antoine Chanzy and Admiral Bernard Jaureguiberry who was a former navy officer of France. The Prussians defeated the French in a gun battle on 16 December and finally won the battle. With this victory, the Germans attacked the enemy's right flank and forced the French forces to withdraw from their stronger defensive position at Fréteval, where they engaged another Prussian army indecisively. The victory at Vendôme also brought the Prussian armies some French prisoners and weapons, while the disadvantage of Chanzy's army forced him to hastily withdraw to Le Mans.

== Background ==
On 11 December 1870, with a dramatic failure for several days against the Prussian army by the Grand Duke Origin Mecklenburg in the Battle of Beaugency, Chanzy began conducting a deplete. On 12 December, upon learning that Chanzy was beginning to withdraw to the northwest, the Germans launched a pursuit. But, Chanzy deceived the Germans: they thought he would run to Tours, but in fact he pulled his troops to a stronger position than the one he had left, on the direct road to Tours and Paris. Here, he can receive reinforcements from the west. Chanzy's troops withdrew under difficult circumstances, and suffered heavy losses in their rearguards. However, due to the caution of the German cavalry, the French reached their new defensive positions on the Loir, both from the Vendôme, on 13 December 1870. On 14 December the army of Friedrich Franz II, Grand Duke of Mecklenburg approached the French troops, who were holding a key position on the outskirts of the small town of Fréteval, and fighting raged for two days here with neither side gaining an advantage. The French defenses were very strong in this city, but the situation showed that the Germans did not have to take Fréteval: after the fall of Blois on 13 December 1870, the Army The X group of the army under Prince Friedrich Karl marched southwest to the city of Vendôme - a small city south of Fréteval, also on the west bank of the Loir and part of the army's front France. Here, the German army discovered their enemy was standing in front of the city, under the support of four artillery batteries deployed on the high points where an ancient castle stood.

== The Battle ==
On 14 and 15 December, the above-mentioned high points were still in the hands of the French army.

Fighting broke out at midday on 16 December, when both General Chanzy and French admiral Jaureguiberry were present in the city. So that they could facilitate a mighty French defense, so General Von Voigts-Rhetz of the Imperial German Army, in order to preserve as much of his force as possible, ordered an artillery force. Soldiers played a major role in the fighting. From 3 hours to 4 hours and a half-way, the German sheels were thunderous. However, the German fire was unable to do any good, because the land here was muddy and there was lightning, so the inertial warhead of the shells were disabled by the mud. Despite this, several French cannons were damaged, and one of the food carts was destroyed, causing heavy damage to the French soldiers standing nearby. The French mitrailleuse machine guns also responded violently to the German cannon fire, but with little effect, because the German assault forces were covered on a large scale. The artillery battle ended with the victory of the German cannons, and by 5 p.m. the French had organized a retreat under the support of the artillery batteries on the heights. The roar of the firecrackers actually ended as it was almost dark. The officer of the French army discussed the outcome of the events of the next day with great confidence. However, Prince Friedrich Karl's forces were sufficient to deal a fatal blow to Vendôme.

During the night of 16 December Prussian forces launched a campaign with the intention of encircling the city to launch an attack at dawn. On the morning of 17 December these preparations were revealed, and the French panicked. They decided to break the bridge over the Loir which they did quickly, though not so smoothly—and retreat. The Germans entered the city, and the bridge was not badly damaged. At 11 a.m., a Prussian battery was put into position on the heights. They opened fire on the retreating French vertical formations. After half an hour, the artillery attack ended, and a number of French prisoners and cannons were brought in. [first]

== Aftermath ==
The German victory at Vendôme had a great influence on the course of the campaign. Covered on the right flank, the French had to leave both Fréteval and Vendôme to the enemy. Having entered Vendôme, the Germans captured 1 machine gun and 6 cannons from the defeated French army. The battle turned against Chanzy, and he withdrew to Le Mans. The German front now stretched from Cloyes to Morée in the north, through Vendôme, to Blois in the southeast. The divisions of the Grand Duke of Mecklenburg captured Cloyes and Morée. Meanwhile, the X Corps held Vendôme and the IX Corps held the position at Blois.

The French entered Le Mans on 21 December 1870, and their weary forces were assembled in barracks around this strategically important position. Although the German army mastered the frontline from Le Mans to Tours, in January 1871, after the sporadic fighting, the Army of the Loire in France recently been entirely defeated in the Battle of Le Mans which lasted for 4 days.
