= Enflo =

Enflo may refer to:

- Per Enflo, Swedish mathematician and pianist, University Professor at Kent State University.
- Enflo wind turbine, a type of Compact wind acceleration turbine
