= Éolienne Bollée =

Wind turbine type

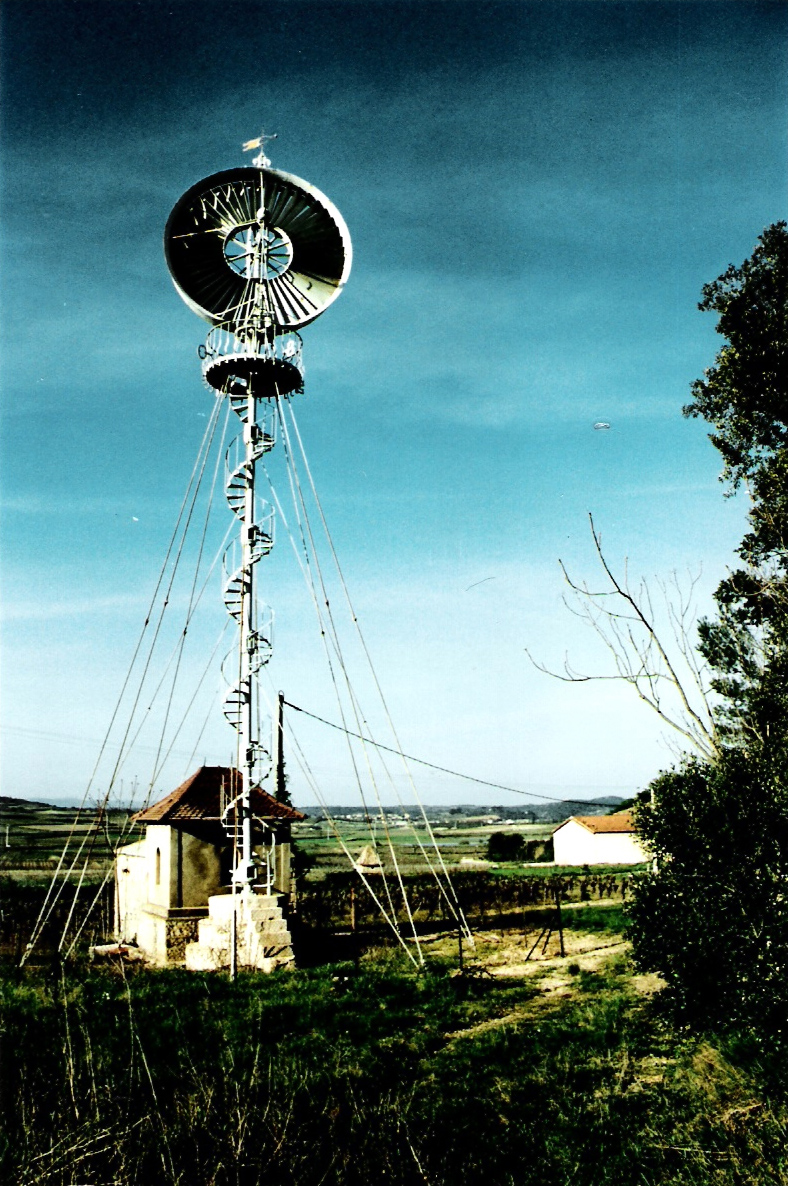
An Éolienne Bollée

The Éolienne Bollée is an unusual wind turbine, unique for having a stator and a rotor, as a water turbine has. The eponymous invention was first patented in 1868 by Ernest Sylvain Bollée in France. A further patent dated 1885 differed mainly in two ways: First, in how the turbine was turned to face the wind and second, in an improvement which increased the flow of wind through the turbine. The turbines built according to the 1885 patent were commercially successful.

== The windpump business ==
Ernest Sylvain Bollée (19 July 1814 – 1891) and Auguste Sylvain Bollée (1847–1906) took out the original patent No. 79985 in 1868 for a "hydraulic wind engine". Ernest Bollée described himself as a hydraulic engineer in Le Mans, Sarthe. During the 1860s, due to poor health, Ernest delegated control of the three parts of his business to each of his sons. Auguste was given control of the wind engine manufacturing side of the business. The patent of 1885, with the improvements, is No.167726. In 1898 Auguste sold the business to Édouard-Émile Lebert. Auguste is estimated to have made about 260 Éoliennes. Lebert passed the business to Gaston Duplay in 1918 and on 1 January 1926 the business passed to the Société Anonyme des Éoliennes Bollée (SAEB). SAEB erected at least three 7-metre (23 ft) éoliennes. Operations seem to have ceased around 1931.

== Construction ==
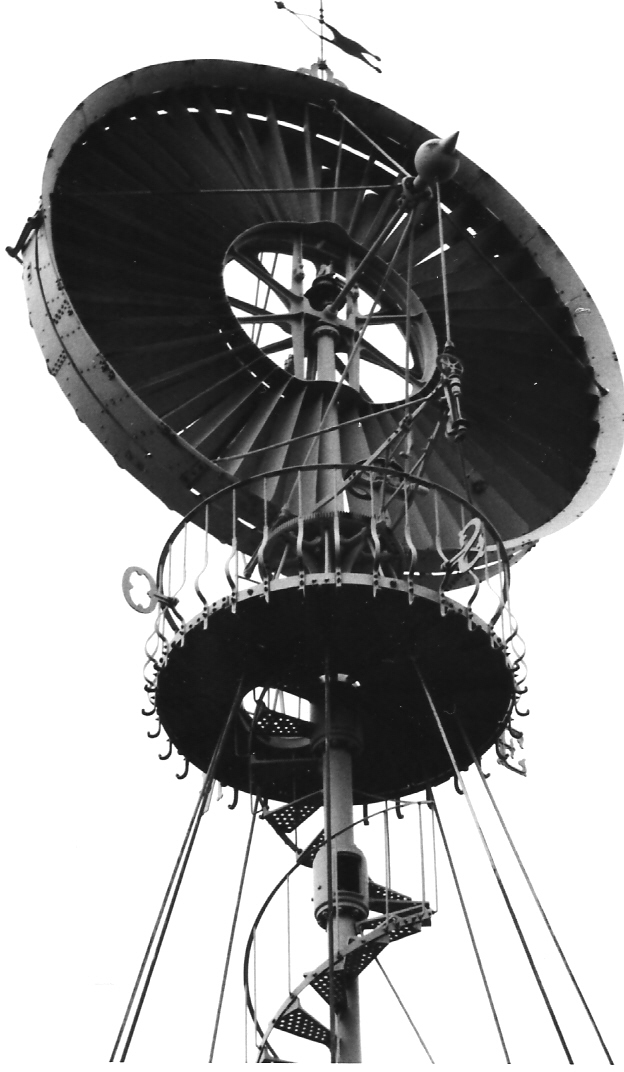
Close-up view of turbine

The Éolienne Bollée was designed to be constructed in a modular form, thus allowing éoliennes of various sizes to be built. The tower could be a standard pylon type, either of triangular or square plan, or a cast-iron column with an external spiral staircase. The éoliennes built with this type of tower have a very distinctive appearance. The actual turbine itself consists of two rings, the first being the stator and the second being the rotor. The stator has more blades than the rotor. A new device added to the 1885 patent was a funnel affixed to the stator, enabling the éolienne to capture wind from a larger area than the rotor, and increasing its speed through the turbine. A small fantail operated upwind of the rotor, and through a system of gears turned the turbine to face the wind. Also, through a counterweight system, it turned the turbine out of wind as the wind speed increased, thus preventing damage in very strong winds, when the éolienne would be edge on into the prevailing wind.

The cast-iron columns were made in 2.85-metre (9 ft 4 in) sections of 175 millimetres (6.9 in) diameter, having twelve cast-iron treads or wrought iron steps forming a complete spiral around the column. A half column was available, allowing éoliennes to be built to any desired height.

== Unique feature ==
The Éolienne Bollée is unique amongst other forms of windmill because of the stator. All windmills have a rotor, whether it is the sails on a traditional windmill or the blades of a modern wind turbine. The Éolienne Bollée is the only wind-powered turbine where the wind passes through a set of fixed blades (stator) before driving the windmill itself (rotor).

== Operation ==
The rotor is turned by the wind, and through a bevel wheel drives a shaft inside the column (if used) or in the centre of the tower. At the lower end this drives a horizontal shaft through a gearbox, which typically drives three throw pump.

== Sizes ==
The éoliennes came in four sizes: 2.5-metre (8 ft 2 in), 3.53-metre (11 ft 7 in), 5-metre (16 ft 5 in) and 7-metre (23 ft) diameter.

The 2.5 m éolienne has a 24 blade stator and an 18 blade rotor.
The 3.53 m éolienne has a 34 blade stator and a 24 blade rotor.
The 5 m éolienne has a 44 blade stator and a 32 blade rotor.

It was claimed that a 3.53 m éolienne with a 65-millimetre (2.6 in) pump would be able to pump:

- 1.4 cubic metres (310 imp gal; 1.8 yd^{3}) of water per hour in a 4-metre-per-second (8.9 mph; 14 km/h) wind,
- 1.8 cubic metres (400 imp gal; 2.4 yd^{3}) of water per hour in a 5-metre-per-second (11 mph; 18 km/h) wind,
- 3 cubic metres (660 imp gal; 3.9 yd^{3}) of water per hour in a 6-metre-per-second (13 mph; 22 km/h) wind, and
- 4 cubic metres (880 imp gal; 5.2 yd^{3}) of water per hour in a 7-metre-per-second (16 mph; 25 km/h) wind.

Pumps were available in seven sizes: 33-millimetre (1.30 in), 42-millimetre (1.65 in), 52-millimetre (2.05 in), 65-millimetre (2.56 in), 80-millimetre (3.15 in), 100-millimetre (3.94 in), and 120-millimetre (4.72 in) diameter.

== Variation ==
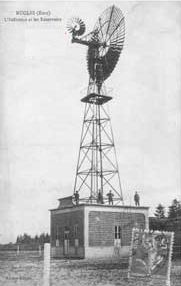
A Lebert Éolienne, Rugles, Eure

Lebert built some very similar wind engines with a single rotor, and lacking the stator (thus they were not true turbines). They were either 7.10 metres (23 ft 4 in) or 8.60 metres (28 ft 3 in) diameter. At least three of these are known to have been built, including at Rugles, Eure and Parigné-l'Évêque, Sarthe.

The Clarkson wind engine consisted of a rotor or a number of rotors, one behind the other, revolving in a casing with fixed guide vanes between and of opposite pitch to those of the rotors, and having a further casing to admit a fresh supply of wind to the rotors behind. The cylindrical casings are open at each end with a larger opening facing the wind. The wind catches a number of wheels and feathered vanes fixed to a shaft revolving in bearings inside the casings. When the wind has passed between the vanes of the front wheel it is directed by the guide vanes to the second wheel and is again taken up by guides and passed to a third wheel and so on, the action each time increasing the effect of the wind on the shaft and improving efficiency. The Clarkson of which an illustration survives (1919) was erected by the Air Power Co. of Prestwich, Cheshire on the estate of Lord Derby. This small engine was designed to work in a 12-mile-per-hour (19 km/h) wind, but could start under load in a wind of only 7 miles per hour (11 km/h). The wind wheel was only 5 feet (1.52 m) diameter and is designed to lift 100 imperial gallons (450 L; 120 US gal) of water per hour to a height of 50 feet (15.24 m) in a 12-mile-per-hour (19 km/h) wind, or double that quantity in a 15-mile-per-hour (24 km/h) wind. All the Air Power wind engines were fitted with roller bearings, a starting and stopping arrangement and an automatic gear to cut off all wind above any desired velocity. They were mounted on a strong steel tower, with a ladder and circular platform.

== Purchasers ==
In the early years, under the Bollée family, the vast majority of purchasers were aristocrats and gentry, only six éoliennes being sold to municipalities by 1888. After Lebert took over, the pattern of sales changed, with more éoliennes being sold for communal water supply, particularly in Indre-et-Loire and Sarthe .

A few éoliennes were sold abroad, including two to a monastery at Cowfold, Sussex; one to a monastery at Tarragona, Spain; one to a hospital in Tunisia; one to a mine in Brazil; and one to Cotonou, Dahomey.

== Locations ==
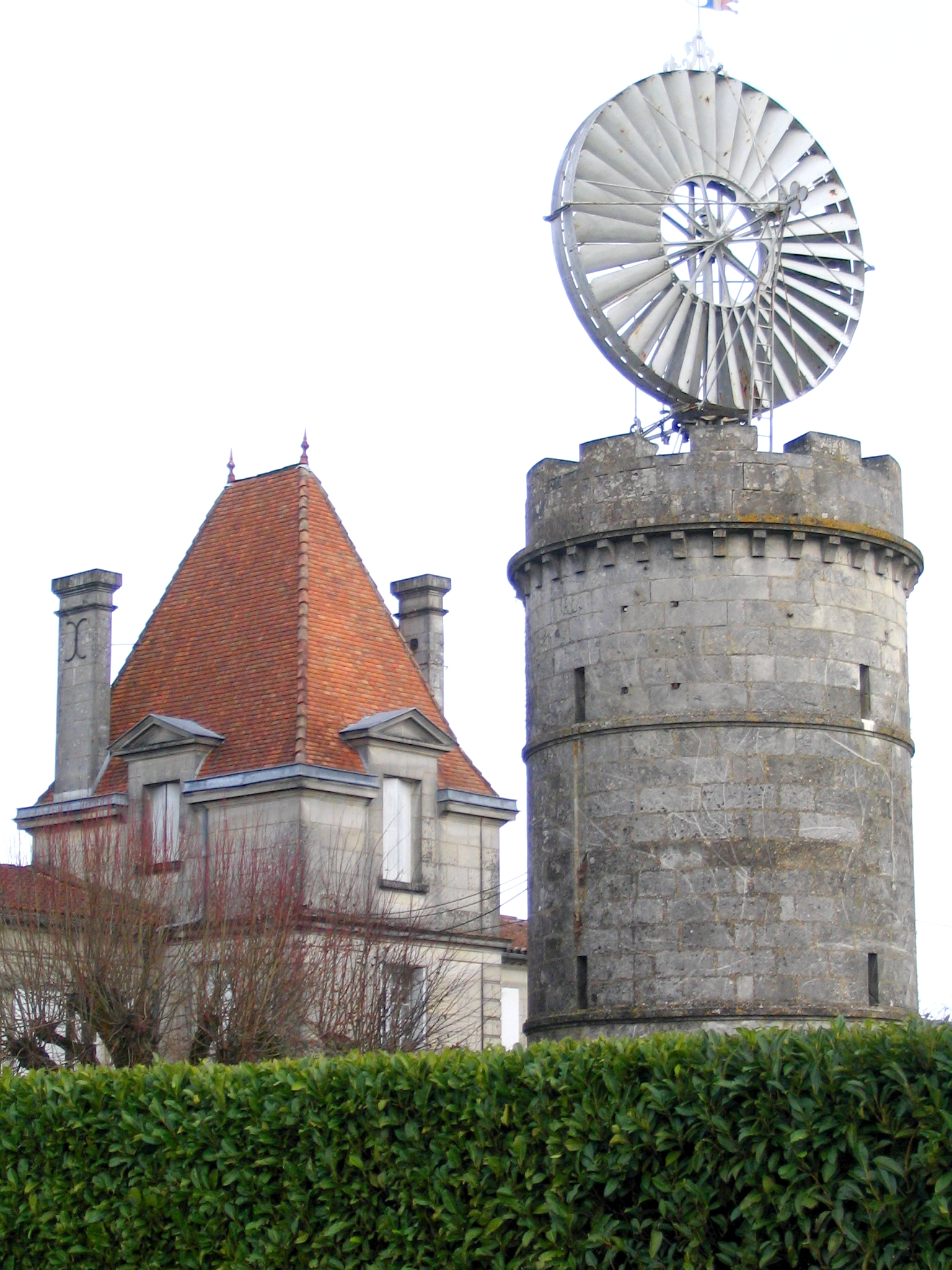
Éolienne on a stone tower

Some éoliennes have survived. In France, the oldest surviving éolienne is at the Bollée bell foundry in Saint-Jean-de-Braye, near Orléans. One is preserved in working order at Épuisay, Loir-et-Cher, and another at the Bollée museum in Orléans. A few have been restored to working order. The grounds of Château Bouvet-Ladubay in Saumur also contain an excellent example. The is an éolienne Bollée in the Parc de Clairbaudieres, Chateau Clerbaud in Paizay le Sec, Vienne. A further exists near Quarante at 43.351731 N 2.993547 E.

== An Éolienne Bollée described ==
The éolienne at Épuisay is on a square plan lattice tower of eight sections, 21 metres (68 ft 11 in) high. The 3.53-metre (11 ft 7 in) rotor drives a pump which pumps water from a depth of 116 metres (380 ft 7 in), the pump itself being at a depth of 35 metres (114 ft 10 in). A 2 horsepower (1.5 kW) petrol engine was provided to work the pumps in times of calm. By wind, 2.5 cubic metres (550 imp gal; 3.3 yd^{3}) an hour could be pumped.

== See also ==
- Renewable energy

== Sources ==
- Azema, Jean-Pierre Henri (1995). Les Moulins de France. France: Éditions Ouest. ISBN 2-7373-1673-1.
- J Kenneth Major, and André Gaucheron (1985). The Eolienne Bollée. Reading: The International Molinological Society.
