= Paul Stapfer =

French essayist (1840–1917)

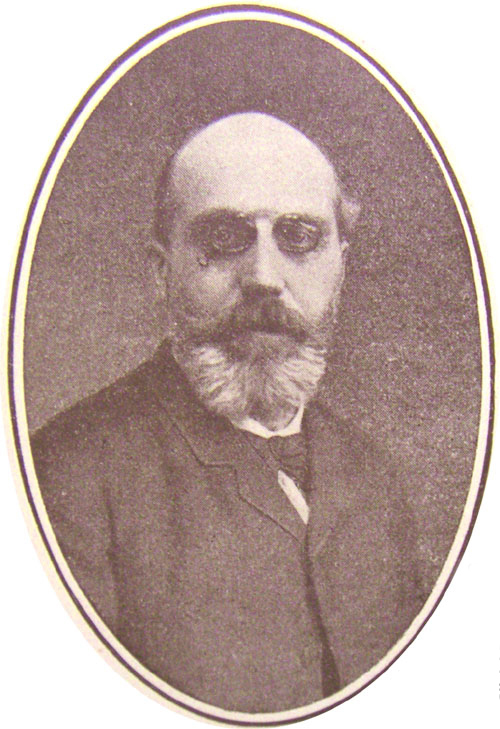
Paul Stapfer 1885 Cl.jpg

Paul Stapfer (1840–1917) was a French essayist, born in Paris, and educated at the Bonaparte Lyceum. After serving as tutor in the family of François Guizot, he became a professor at Grenoble. In 1883, he accepted a similar professorship at Bordeaux. Stapfer's essays are remarkable for their clarity of style, perfection of finish and accuracy of detail. He edited the Grands écrivains series. Among his works are:

- Petite comédie de la critique littéraire de Molière selon les trois écoles philosophiques (1866)
- Fragment Inedit (1870)
- Causeries guernesiaises (1881)
- Laurence Sterne, sa personne et ses ouvrages (2nd ed., Paris, 1882)
- Shakespeare et l'antiquité (1883), which revealed to anti-Stratfordians the depth of its subject's knowledge of Latin and his formidable acquaintance with Greek.
- Goethe et ses deux chefs-d'œuvre classiques (1881)
- Racine et Victor Hugo (1886)
- Rabelais, sa personne, son génie, son œuvre (1889)
- Montaigne (1894)
- La grande prédication chrétienne en France: Bossuet, Adolphe Monod (1898)
- Des réputations littéraires and Victor Hugo et la grande poésie satirique en France (1901)
- Questions esthétiques et religieuses (1906)
- Etudes sur Goethe (1906)
- Vers la vérité (1909)
