= Marthalen Landi-Silo =

Silo Zurich, Switzerland

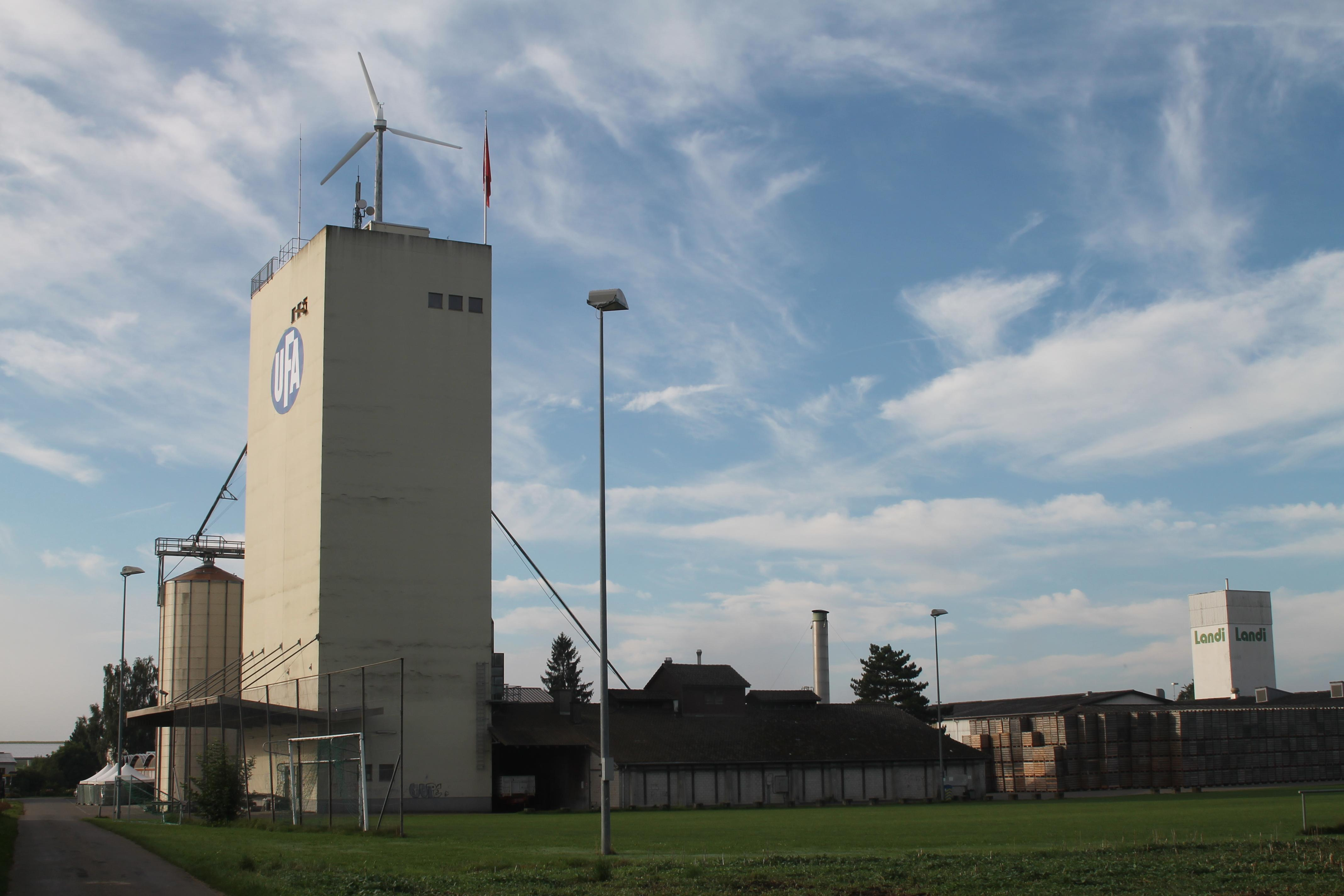
Marthalen Landi-Silo

Marthalen Landi-Silo is a 35 metres high silo east of Marthalen in Switzerland. Marthalen Landi-Silo is one of the few buildings with a wind turbine on the roof. The estimate terrain elevation above sea level is 408 metres.
