= Wind lens =

Wind turbine type

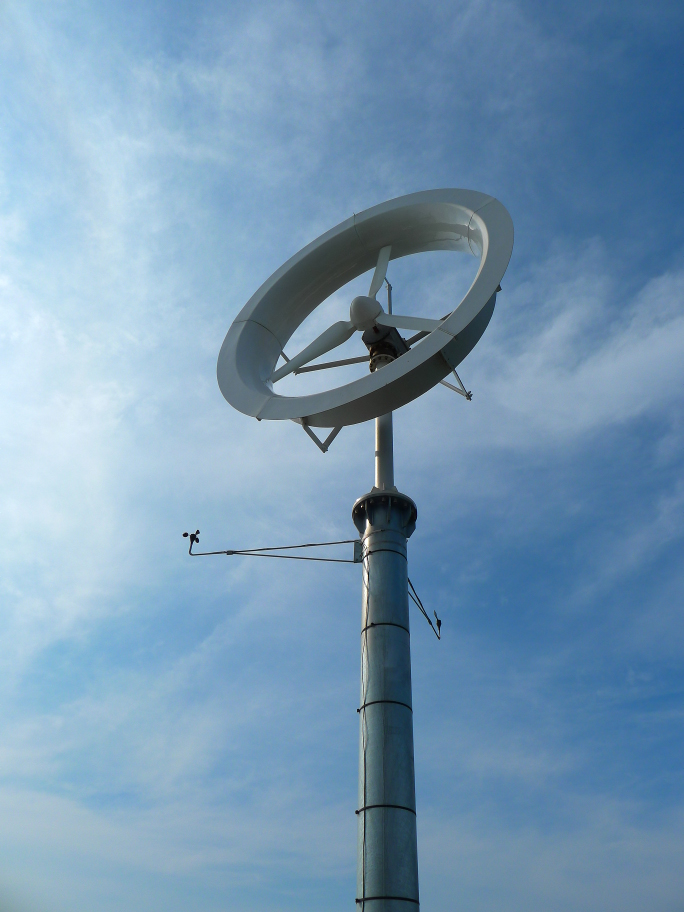
A wind lens in 2012.

The wind lens is a modification on the wind turbine created by Professor Ohya from Kyushu University, as an attempt to be more efficient in producing electricity and less invasive to both humans and nature. While still under development, the wind lens incorporates design changes that alter how wind energy is harnessed and reduce its environmental impact. A wind lens works like a ducted fan on an aircraft - it encircles the wind turbine, and speeds air up while protecting the blades from foreign object damage. Consequently, wind turbine efficiency can be drastically increased through the simple installation of a wind lens.

== Design ==
Like a conventional wind turbine, the wind lens harnesses the energy of the wind but incorporates modifications to increase efficiency and decrease environmental impact.

=== Efficiency of power production ===
Studies have shown that the wind lens can produce between two and five times more power than a standard wind turbine due to its enhanced wind-harvesting design.

The turbulence created as a result of the new configuration creates a low pressure zone behind the turbine, causing greater wind to pass through the turbine, and this, in turn, increases blade rotation and energy output. One way to get the most out of the wind input is by using a specially shaped tube around the blades. The tube, or shroud, is shaped as a diffuser that works like a magnifying glass for wind. The diffuser, which is smaller in the front and bigger in the back, catches more wind and focuses the wind towards the center blades which also leads to more efficient production of power.

In addition to the diffuser shape of the shroud, the back has a brim. This brim disturbs the wind flow which creates vortexes that cause a low pressure area to be formed behind the wind lens. The wind then flows to the low pressure area through the blades of the wind lens. The increased airflow through the blades is another reason for the higher power production.

The diffuser shape and the brim combined create more efficiently placed and accurate airflow. This results in higher energy production.

=== Impacts ===
Complaints about the wind turbine include the effect on the bird population, sound production, and radar interference which limits its placement in urban areas. The creators of the wind lens took a look at the problems and tried to solve them by adjusting the design.

==== Bird population ====
Wind turbines have a detrimental effect on the bird population due to migration patterns and birds being caught and injured or even killed by the towering high speed blade. To resolve this issue, the wind lens shroud encloses the blades to help prevent birds from entering their path, and a mesh added to both ends prevents birds from being pulled inside. The addition of this mesh causes a negligible decrease in power production, therefore offering a net benefit. In addition to the mesh, the wind lens features a shorter, more compact design than conventional wind turbines, allowing birds to easily fly over it.

==== Sound production ====
Wind lenses are designed to produce less sound than conventional wind turbines, making them suitable for placement in urban areas without disturbing residents. The blade design optimizes the angle and shape to cut through the wind more silently.

The biggest cause of the sound in the conventional wind turbine is the air drag at the tips of the blades However, because the shroud covers the blade tips and focuses airflow toward the center, air drag at the tips is minimized.

==== Radar interference ====
Radar interference is consistently a problem with wind turbines which causes different groups to be against the use of wind farms near urban areas. Comparative studies show that the wind lens causes significantly less radar interference due to its compact shroud design and geometry.

=== Limitations ===
Despite the beneficial additions to the design, there are still limitations:

- The wind lens requires more materials than unshrouded wind turbines.
- The extra material required makes the system heavier. It also increases costs.

== Application ==
The wind lens is being looked to as a way to increase the production of clean energy as well as an archetype for other types of clean energy.

The wind lens could replace environmentally harmful fossil fuel electricity generation and serve as an alternative to conventional wind turbines due to its higher energy output and environmental adaptability.

=== Current projects ===
The wind lens is currently being adjusted and approved by testing it in multiple ways and at multiple places.

- Following research at Kettering University, the wind lens is undergoing testing in Michigan, with positive preliminary results.
- In Japan, the wind lens is being implemented in urban areas by the shore where windspeeds are high.
- The technology is being tested at an offshore site as part of a floating, multipurpose system that combines solar panels, fish farming, and wind generation.
- The mechanism is also being adapted for underwater use as a "water lens" to harvest energy from water currents.
- Engineers at the Kyushu University Ito campus are adjusting the design to improve structural integrity under high wind loads.

== See also ==
- Compact wind acceleration turbine
- Darrieus wind turbine
- Éolienne Bollée
- Giromill
- Savonius wind turbine
- Wind turbine
- Windbelt
- Windpump
