= Talcy, Loir-et-Cher =

Talcy
- Commune
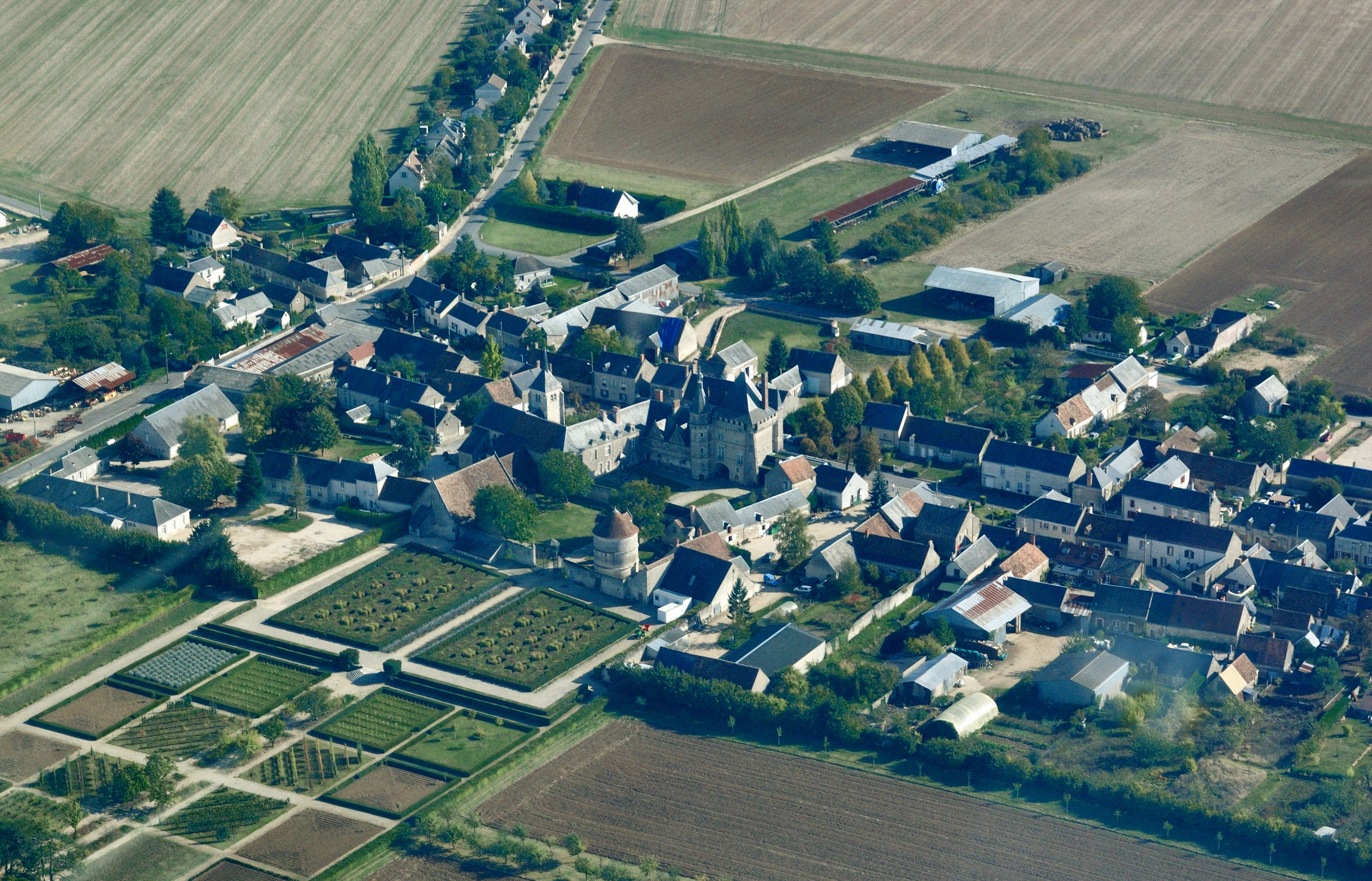
- Talcy with its château

- Coat of arms
- Location of Talcy
- Location within France Location within Centre-Val de Loire
- Coordinates: 47°46′11″N 1°26′40″E
- Country: France
- Region: Centre-Val de Loire
- Department: Loir-et-Cher
- Arrondissement: Blois
- Canton: La Beauce

Government
  - Mayor (2020–2026): Josiane Bourgoin
- Area^{1}: 15.21 km^{2} (5.87 sq mi)
- Elevation: 120 m (390 ft)
- Highest elevation: 126 m (413 ft)
- Lowest elevation: 107 m (351 ft)
- Population (2023): 279
  - Density: 18.3/km^{2} (47.5/sq mi)
- Time zone: UTC+01:00 (CET)
  - Summer (DST): UTC+02:00 (CEST)
- INSEE/Postal code: 41253 /41370
- ^{1} French Land Register data, which excludes lakes, ponds, glaciers > 1 km^{2} (0.386 sq mi or 247 acres) and river estuaries.

Talcy (French pronunciation: [talsi]) is a commune of the Loir-et-Cher department, central France.

It is known for the Château de Talcy.

== Population ==
Historical population
Year	Pop.	±% p.a.
1968	235	—
1975	223	−0.75%
1982	241	+1.12%
1990	240	−0.05%
1999	247	+0.32%
2007	246	−0.05%
2012	262	+1.27%
2017	243	−1.49%
2023	279	+2.33%
Source: INSEE

== See also ==
- Communes of the Loir-et-Cher department
