= Battle of Beaugency (1870) =

- Part of the Franco-Prussian War
Date	8–10 December 1870
Location	Beaugency, Loiret, France 47.7792°N 1.6325°E
Result	Prussian victory

Belligerents
North German Confederation: Prussia	French Republic

Commanders and leaders
Friedrich Franz II	Antoine Chanzy

Strength
30,000	60,000

Casualties and losses
600 killed 2,900 wounded 100 missing or captured	5,000 killed or wounded 4,000 missing or captured

The Battle of Beaugency took place during the Franco-Prussian War between the army group of the Grand Duke of Mecklenburg, and the French Armée de la Loire, won by the Prussians. It lasted from 8 to 10 December 1870 and occurred on the left bank of the river Loire to the northwest of the town of Beaugency. Due to the large area over which it was fought, it is also known as the Battle of Beaugency-Cravant or the Battle of Villorceau-Josnes.

== Context ==
=== Sharing the Army of the Loire at Orléans ===
The Army of the Loire had been split subsequent to the retreat of General Aurelle after the Battle of Loigny. French political leader Gambetta 'retired' Aurelle and appointed two generals to lead the now split armies. General Antoine Chanzy commanded the two corps north of the Loire (XVI and XVII) while General Bourbaki commanded south of the river (XV, XVIII and XX corps).

=== Beaugency until 8 December ===
From his headquarters at Chateau de Talcy Chazny grouped three divisions in defensive positions at Beaugency to make a stand with the Loire river on his right flank and his left in the forest of Marchenoir. Continual rain and snow coupled with flagging morale and disorganization he could do little else.

== Course ==
During the 8th and 9th fierce fighting occurred between the Germans and French. Both sides fought for the key positions of the walled villages of Cravant and Beumont. The French had superiority of numbers (~60,000) and effective artillery fire forced the Germans (Mecklenburg) to break contact. Cold, exhaustion and deprivations plagued the Germans as well as the French during this time.

Moltke ordered Mecklenburg reinforced by Prince Freiderich Karl to destroy the French forces under Chanzy. Chanzy's only hope was assistance from Bourbaki's 150,000 troops south of the Loire. Bourbaki attempted to order his dispirited troops into action, but they refused his order. After visiting Bourbaki Gambetta stated that it "was the saddest sight he had ever seen," the army was "in veritable dissolution."

=== 10 December ===
Chanzy had to break contact and retreat from the Loire toward Le Mans once German reinforcements arrived.

== Sources ==
- Compton's Home Library: Battles of the World
- Friedrich Engels: On the War, The Pall Mall Gazette Nr. 1824 of 17 December 1870
- Amtspresse Preußen
- Bodart, Gaston (1908). Militär-historisches Kriegs-Lexikon (1618-1905) (in German). Vienna and Leipzig: C. W. Stern.
