= Épuisay =

- Commune
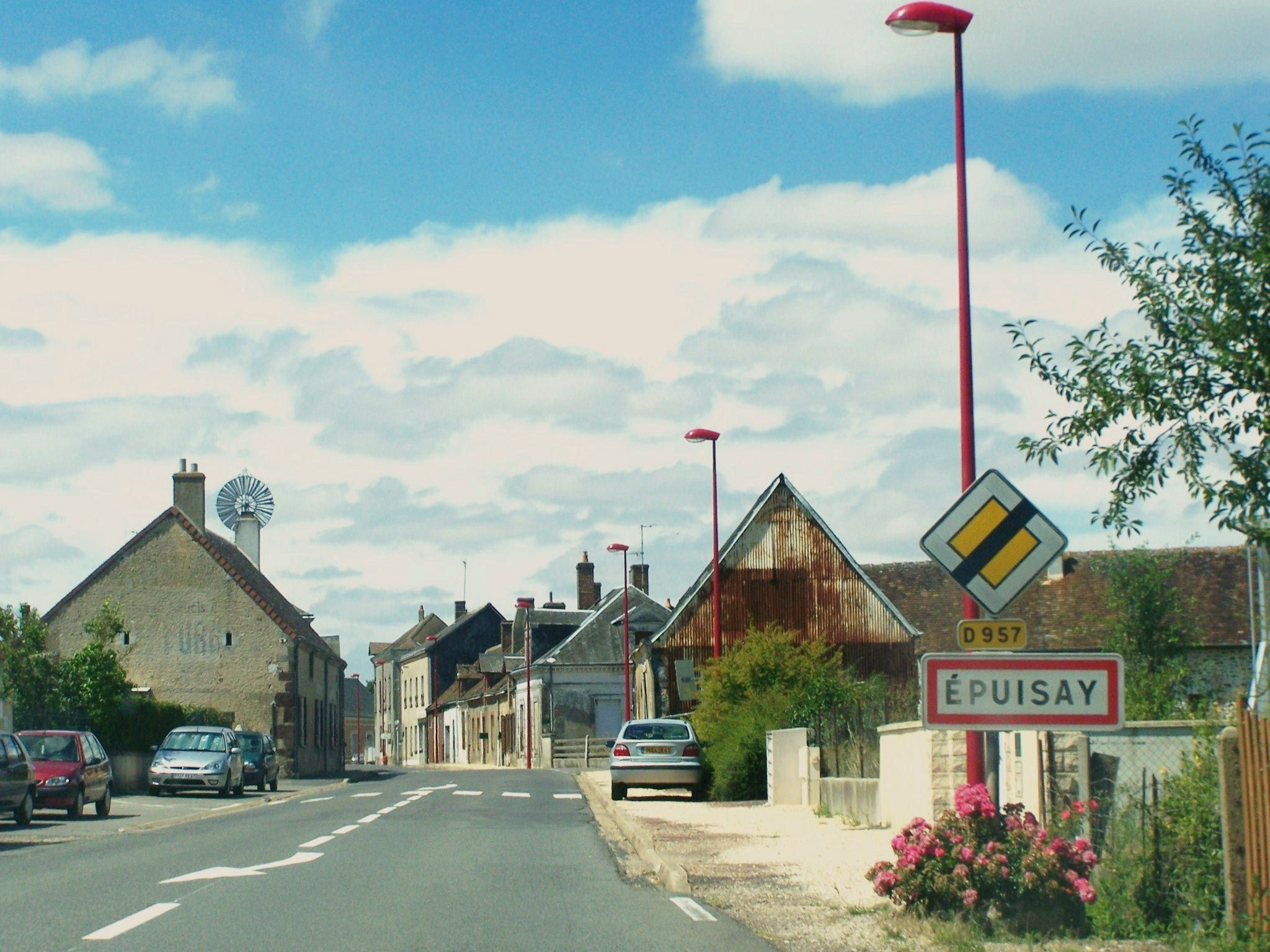

- Coat of arms
- Location of Épuisay
- Location within France Location within Centre-Val de Loire
- Coordinates: 47°54′04″N 0°55′56″E
- Country: France
- Region: Centre-Val de Loire
- Department: Loir-et-Cher
- Arrondissement: Vendôme
- Canton: Le Perche
- Intercommunality: CA Territoires Vendômois

Government
  - Mayor (2020–2026): Michel Deniau
- Area^{1}: 23.52 km^{2} (9.08 sq mi)
- Elevation: 164 m (538 ft)
- Highest elevation: 182 m (597 ft)
- Lowest elevation: 119 m (390 ft)
- Population (2023): 787
  - Density: 33.5/km^{2} (86.7/sq mi)
- Time zone: UTC+01:00 (CET)
  - Summer (DST): UTC+02:00 (CEST)
- INSEE/Postal code: 41078 /41360
- ^{1} French Land Register data, which excludes lakes, ponds, glaciers > 1 km^{2} (0.386 sq mi or 247 acres) and river estuaries.

Épuisay (French pronunciation: [epɥizɛ]) is a commune in the Loir-et-Cher department of central France.

== Population ==
Historical population
| Year | Pop. | ±% p.a. |
|---|---|---|
| 1968 | 541 | — |
| 1975 | 492 | −1.35% |
| 1982 | 526 | +0.96% |
| 1990 | 539 | +0.31% |
| 1999 | 532 | −0.15% |
| 2007 | 681 | +3.13% |
| 2012 | 773 | +2.57% |
| 2017 | 831 | +1.46% |
| 2023 | 787 | −0.90% |
Source: INSEE

== See also ==
- Communes of the Loir-et-Cher department
