= Morée =

- Commune
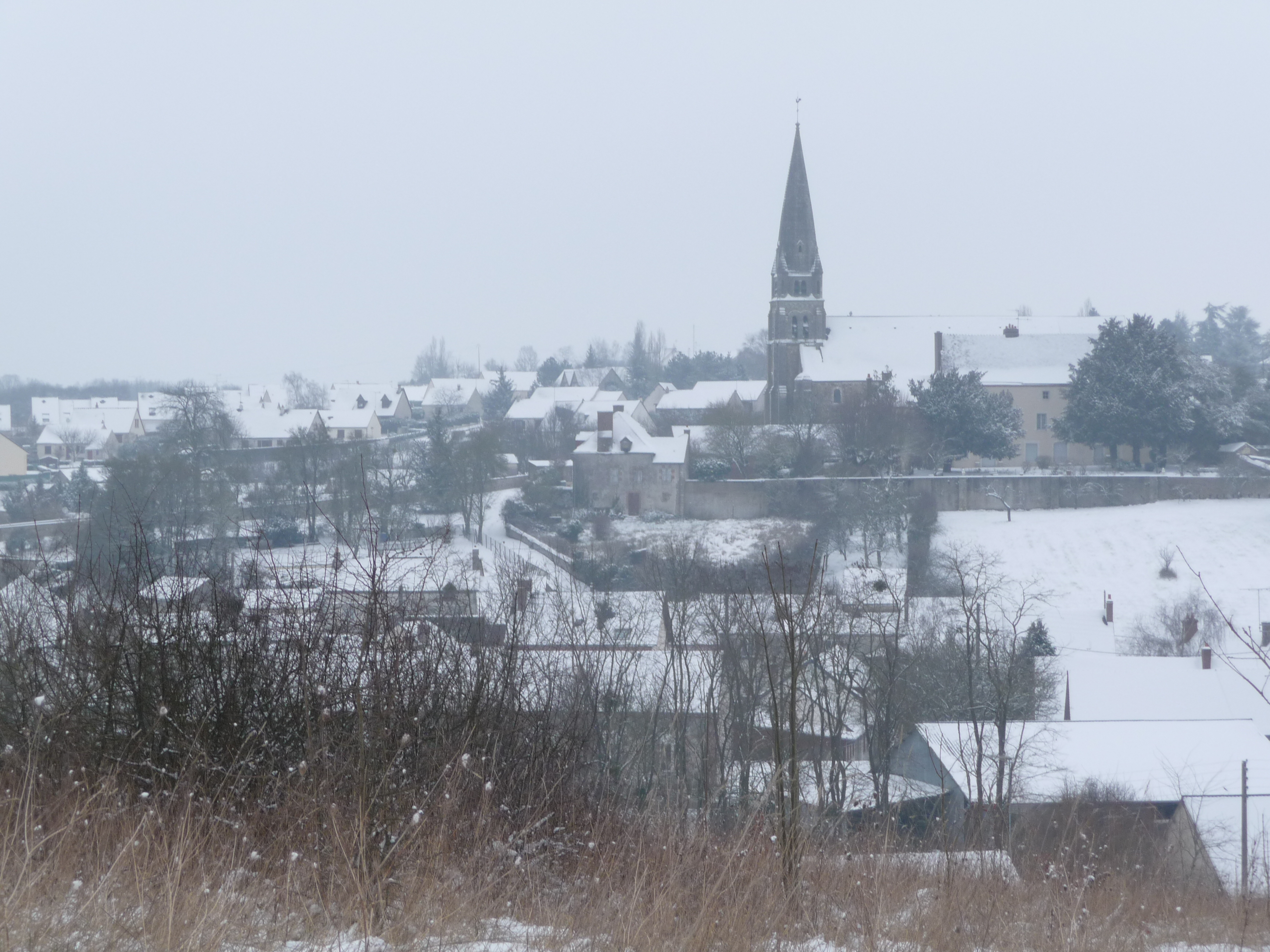

- Coat of arms
- Location of Morée
- Location within France Location within Centre-Val de Loire
- Coordinates: 47°54′13″N 1°14′07″E
- Country: France
- Region: Centre-Val de Loire
- Department: Loir-et-Cher
- Arrondissement: Vendôme
- Canton: Le Perche
- Intercommunality: Perche et Haut Vendômois

Government
  - Mayor (2020–2026): Alain Bourgeois
- Area^{1}: 25.83 km^{2} (9.97 sq mi)
- Elevation: 96 m (315 ft)
- Highest elevation: 152 m (499 ft)
- Lowest elevation: 86 m (282 ft)
- Population (2023): 1,077
  - Density: 41.70/km^{2} (108.0/sq mi)
- Time zone: UTC+01:00 (CET)
  - Summer (DST): UTC+02:00 (CEST)
- INSEE/Postal code: 41154 /41160
- ^{1} French Land Register data, which excludes lakes, ponds, glaciers > 1 km^{2} (0.386 sq mi or 247 acres) and river estuaries.

Morée (French pronunciation: [mɔʁe]) is a commune in the Loir-et-Cher department of central France.

== Population ==
Historical population
Year	Pop.	±% p.a.
1968	979	—
1975	1,012	+0.47%
1982	1,104	+1.25%
1990	1,061	−0.50%
1999	994	−0.72%
2007	1,073	+0.96%
2012	1,145	+1.31%
2017	1,071	−1.33%
2023	1,077	+0.09%
Source: INSEE

== See also ==
- Communes of the Loir-et-Cher department
