= Compact wind acceleration turbine =

Class of wind turbine

Compact Wind Acceleration Turbines (CWATs) are a class of wind turbine that uses structures to accelerate wind before it enters the wind-generating element. The concept of these structures has been around for decades but has not gained wide acceptance in the marketplace. In 2008, two companies targeting the mid-wind (100 kW-1 MW) marketplace have received funding from venture capital. The first company to receive funding is Optiwind, which received its series A funding in April 2008, and the second company is Ogin, Inc. (formerly FloDesign Wind Turbine Inc.), which also received its series A funding in April 2008. Optiwind is funded through Charles River Ventures and FloDesign is funded through Kleiner Perkins. Other CWATs under development include the WindTamer from AristaPower, WindCube, Innowind (conceptual offshore application) and Enflo turbines.

== History ==
CWATs are a new acronym that encompasses the class of machines formerly known as DAWTs (diffuser augmented wind turbines). The technologies mentioned above all use diffuser augmentation that is substantially similar to previous designs as the primary means of acceleration. DAWTs were heavily researched by K. Foreman and Oman of Grumman Aerospace in the 1970s and 1980s and Igra in Israel in the 1970s. At the end of a decade of wind tunnel research and design funded by Grumman, NASA, and the DOE, it was determined that the DAWT system's economics were not sufficient to justify commercialization. In the 1990s the Grumman technology was licensed to a New Zealand company, Vortec Wind. The attempt to commercialize the Vortec 7 in New Zealand from 1998 to 2002 proved it to be economically untenable when compared to the dominant HAWT (horizontal axis wind turbine) technology.

== Economics ==
Ultimately, any wind turbine design must be measured against economic realities. It must positively answer the question, "is the cost to install and operate the system lower than the cost of other alternatives, including the local electric grid?" Historically, CWAT/DAWT designs have failed to overcome this hurdle as compared to more conventional HAWT designs. However, there is reason to believe that this equation may be shifting towards these new designs. The two primary drivers of this equation have been the amount of augmentation and the structural implications of these additional design elements.

=== Augmentation ===
The first factor regards power increase and the method of comparison used by DAWT (and more recently CWAT) designers to determine whether the system is worth developing. Grumman and other attempts to commercialize these machines compare their machines to HAWTs based on a rotor area to rotor area comparison. As Van Bussel of Delft (The Science of Making More Torque from Wind: Diffuser Experiments and Theory Revisited, G.J.W. van Bussel, Delft, 2007) pointed out, this is an inaccurate comparison and the comparison of power multiples should be made on the basis of the exit area of the diffuser or shroud not the rotor area. Grumman claimed a 4× increase over an unshrouded turbine based on an acceleration of 1.6 times the ambient wind velocity (An Investigation on Diffuser Augmented Turbines, D.G. Philips, 2003 (reference materials compiled from K.M. Foreman)). A 1.6 acceleration is in fact 2.6 times the power of a HAWT if the ratio of the shrouded rotor to the exit area is 1.6. If however the rotor to exit area ratio is 2.75 (as it was in the Grumman case), the actual power increase over a HAWT with the same swept area as the diffuser exit area is only 1.4× the power (a Cp of .34 related to the exit area, slightly better than a small unducted wind turbine and significantly worse than utility scale wind turbine Cp's). Given that the DAWTs with this ratio have roughly a solidity of 60+% when the blades and the diffuser are accounted for and the solidity of the HAWT is roughly 10%, the cost and amount of material needed to produce the 40% gain outweighs the increase in power.

=== Structural Implications ===
Second is the structural requirement in terms of resisting overturning and bending in extreme wind events which all wind turbines must be designed for in accordance with the IEC 61400 series of standards (IEC) . The DAWT structure typically has poor drag characteristics (see D.G. Philips). That combined with higher solidity can lead to substantially greater structural costs than a HAWT in the support structure, the yaw bearing, and the foundation, when using conventional monopole designs. However, the advent of new tower designs, flange geometries and foundation systems appear to be successfully challenging these historical norms but if so then these advances can be equally well applied to improving the economics of conventional HAWT designs.

== Optiwind ==
In the case of Optiwind (now defunct), there appears to be a growing body of evidence that they believe have solved for both the acceleration and economic challenges posed by CWAT/DAWT designs. Where previous attempts at new designs in this category have focused purely on acceleration magnitude, Optiwind appears to have taken a more holistic approach to their design, considering cost as much as acceleration benefit. In addition, the ongoing operational and maintenance cost of the entire unit appears to be successfully addressed in this design. It is absent the significant cost drivers of HAWT systems - large composite blades, gearbox, yaw motor, pitch control, lubrication, etc. In addition, the novel foundation geometry appears to have mitigated the structural challenges of the conventional monopole foundation design, which was originally conceived to offset the counter-rotational effects ("wobbling") of large, three blade turbines. As such, it is reasonable to assume that Optiwind's holistic approach to systemwide costs have led to a series of designs and discoveries that can realistically deliver the economic advantages of accelerated wind at a cost that is less than the net system cost. This is accurate if the Optiwind system is compared to a HAWT purely on rating. The problem therein is, if one compares the Optiwind design based on its stack height (the distance from its lowest turbine to the highest turbine) to a traditional HAWT of the same diameter, the overall power output of the machine is 20% less than that of the HAWT, with all the attendant material and structural expenses generally associated with a CWAT/DAWT. On average a CWAT/DAWT system would need to produce at least 2-3 times the energy a HAWT could produce from the maximum area used by the CWAT/DAWT in order to offset the substantially larger material costs. There is no evidence yet that there are any DAWT/CWAT designs capable of this level of increase when compared on an apples to apples basis with HAWT's.

== Ogin (formerly FloDesign Wind Turbine) ==
Ogin's MEWT (mixer-ejector wind turbine, another CWAT variation) is differentiated from previous DAWT's by using a lobed two stage diffuser (Grumman and Vortec machine were also two stage, but conical instead of lobed) to equalize the pressure over the exit area of the diffuser. The theory is that creating a uniform pressure distribution with the lobes and the injection of external flow will prevent boundary layer separation in the diffuser thereby allowing the maximum acceleration through rotor. Werle and Presz's (Flodesign's chief scientists) paper, AAIA technical note Ducted Water/Wind turbines revisited - 2007, details the theory behind their design. Maximum acceleration detailed in their paper is 1.8× the ambient velocity from which they derive that 3 times more power is available at the rotor than for an unshrouded turbine. When referred to exit area this multiple drops to parity with the HAWT power. Ogin's turbine based on released images and CAD's appears to be substantially similar to the Vortec and Grumman machines except for the lobed inner annulus. This would indicate that its drag characteristics can be expected to be similar. Newer information on the Ogin website (www.oginenergy.com) shows the lobes flattened out into 2D panels. A number of Ogin wind turbines have been taken down after less than six months, for undisclosed reasons.

== Performance ==
The science of wind acceleration around a structure, as well as the vortex shedding benefits of a shroud/diffuser, are well understood and tested. From Bernoulli forward, science has substantially vetted these concepts and there is general academic consensus as to their veracity and their potential impact on wind power production. DAWT's however have the classic boundary layer separation problem experienced by airfoils at a "stall" angle of attack. This significantly reduces the acceleration achievable by a DAWT relative to the theoretical rate indicated by its exit to area ratio, per Flodesign paper mentioned above. It is generally thought that since the amount of power produced by a wind turbine is proportional to the cube of the wind speed, any acceleration benefit is potentially statistically significant in the economics of wind. As noted though this is an inaccurate as it ignores the impact of the exit to area ratio and is therefore an apples to oranges comparison. In the case of a typical CWAT/DAWT the power result in perfect theoretical operation once adjusted for the area of the shroud is actually the square of the velocity at the rotor. As the CWAT/DAWT diverges from theoretical function the power increase drops significantly according to the formula derived from mass conservation,

${\text {Power Ratio}}_{DAWT \over HAWT} = {{A_{throat}} \over {A_{intake}}} \left ({V_{throat} \over V_{freestream}} \right )^3$

${\text {Power Ratio}}_{DAWT \over HAWT} = {1 \over 2.75}\left({27.5 \text { ms} \over 10 \text{ ms}} \right)^3 = 7.56 \text { increase}$

So for example, a DAWT operating at theoretical function of 1.8 with a 2.75 area ratio per FloDesign,

${\text {Power Ratio}}_{DAWT \over HAWT} = {1 \over 2.75}\left({18 \text { ms} \over 10 \text{ ms}} \right)^3 = 2.12 \text { increase}$

For the highest claimed velocity increase in a DAWT of 1.6 × freestream,

${\text {Power Ratio}}_{DAWT \over HAWT} = {1 \over 2.75}\left({16 \text { ms} \over 10 \text{ ms}} \right)^3 = 1.48 \text { increase}$

Not significant enough to offset the associated costs. The problem with optiwind is even more severe since the system only covers a fraction of the swept area available to a HAWT of the stack height.

The challenge is installing, operating, and maintaining these structures for a cost that is less than the incremental value gained by their presence. Recent developments in material science, installation methodology and overall system integration have led to the view that we are very close to this advent if the issues elucidated above can be dealt with which still remains questionable for the DAWT geometry.

Among the recent DAWT designs that appear to have a definitive positive power, if not cost, comparison to HAWTs is the Enflo turbine. Based on its rotor:exit ratio and the published power performance this turbine appears to have a confirmed 2 times increase in power output over a HAWT of the diameter of the exit area. It is still unlikely that this machine can scale to larger ratings but based on their published data (not confirmed by third party testing) the Enflo appears to be the best performing DAWT/CWAT yet built.

== Glossary ==
- CWAT, Compact wind acceleration turbine
- DAWT, Diffuser augmented wind turbine
- HAWT, Horizontal axis wind turbine
- MEWT, Mixer-ejector wind turbine

== See also ==
- Blade solidity
- Bahrain World Trade Center An example of three wind accelerated turbines, in this case in a non-compact and novel form factor.
