= Antoine Chanzy =

French general

Alfred Chanzy
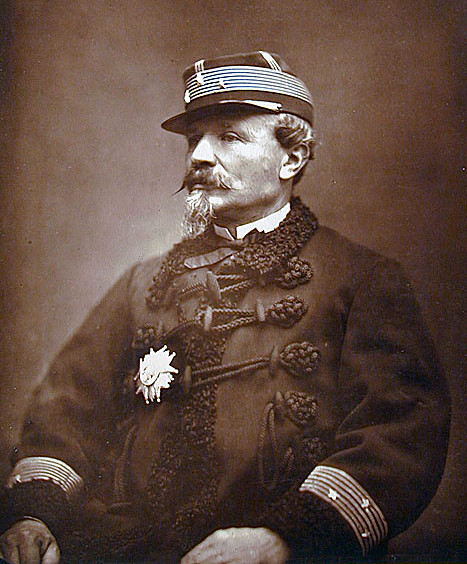
- Antoine Alfred Eugène Chanzy
- Born: 18 March 1823; Nouart, France
- Died: 4 January 1883 (aged 59); Châlons-en-Champagne, France
- Military career
- Allegiance: Kingdom of France; French Second Republic; Second French Empire; French Third Republic
- Branch: French Army
- Service years: 1843–1883
- Rank: Général de Division
- Commands: XVI Corps; VII Corps; XIX Corps
- Conflicts: Franco-Austrian War; Franco-Prussian War
- Awards: Grand Cross of the Légion d'honneur Médaille militaire

Antoine Eugène Alfred Chanzy (French pronunciation: [ɑ̃twan øʒɛn alfʁɛd ʃɑ̃zi]; 18 March 1823 – 4 January 1883) was a French general, notable for his successes during the Franco-Prussian War and as a governor of Algeria.

== Biography ==
Born in Nouart in the department of Ardennes, France, the son of a cavalry officer, Chanzy was educated at the naval school at Brest, but enlisted in the artillery. He subsequently attended the military academy Saint Cyr, and was commissioned in the Zouaves during 1843. He participated in a good deal of fighting in Algeria, and was promoted lieutenant in 1848, and to captain in 1851. He became chef de bataillon in 1856, and served in the Second Italian War of Independence, being present at the battles of Magenta and Solferino. He participated with the Syrian campaign of 1860–61 as a lieutenant-colonel, and as colonel commanded the 45th Regiment at Rome in 1864. He returned to Algeria as general of brigade, assisted to quell the Arab insurrection, and commanded the subdivisions of Bel Abbes and Tlemçen in 1868.

Although Chanzy had acquired a good professional reputation, he was in disfavor at the war office because of suspected contributions to the press, and when the war with Prussia began he was refused a brigade command. After the revolution, however, the government of national defence recalled him from Algeria, made him a general of division, and gave him command of the XVI Corps of the Army of the Loire.

The Loire army won the greatest success of the French during the entire war at Coulmiers, and followed this with another victorious action at Patay; in both engagements General Chanzy's corps performed the best. After the Second Battle of Orléans and the separation of the two wings of the French army, Chanzy was appointed to command that of the west, designated the second army of the Loire. His enemies, Grand Duke Friedrich Franz II of Mecklenburg-Schwerin, Prince Frederick Charles of Prussia, and General von der Tann, all regarded Chanzy as their most formidable opponent.

Chanzy displayed conspicuous moral courage and constancy, not less than technical skill, in the fighting from the Battle of Beaugency to the Loire. Nevertheless, his army of badly armed conscripts suffered a great defeat at the Battle of Le Mans in January 1871. Chanzy successfully retired to Laval behind the Mayenne but his forces had been depleted severely.

He was made a grand officer of the Legion of Honour, and was elected to the National Assembly. At the beginning of the Commune rebellion, Chanzy, then in Paris, was captured by the insurgents, by whom he was forced to give his parole not to serve against them. It was said that he would otherwise have been appointed instead of Patrice MacMahon to command the army of Versailles. A ransom of £40,000 was also paid by the government for him.

In 1872, Chanzy became a member of the committee of defence and commander of the VII Corps, and in 1873 was appointed governor of Algeria and commander of XIX Corps, where he remained for six years. In 1875, he was elected a life senator, in 1878 received the grand cross of the Legion of Honour, and in 1879, without his consent, was nominated for the presidency of the republic, receiving a third of the total votes.

From 1879 to 1882 Chanzy was ambassador to Russia, during which time he received many tokens of respect, not only from the Russians, but also from the German emperor, William I, and Prince Bismarck. He died suddenly, while commanding the VI Corps (stationed nearest to the German frontier), at Châlons-sur-Marne now Châlons-en-Champagne, only a few days after Leon Gambetta, and he received a state funeral.

Chanzy was the author of La Deuxième Armée de la Loire (1872). Statues of General Chanzy have been erected at Nouart and Le Mans.

Chanzy was immortalized in Anatole France's classic fiction The Wicker Work Woman.
