= Wind turbine =

Device to generate electricity from wind

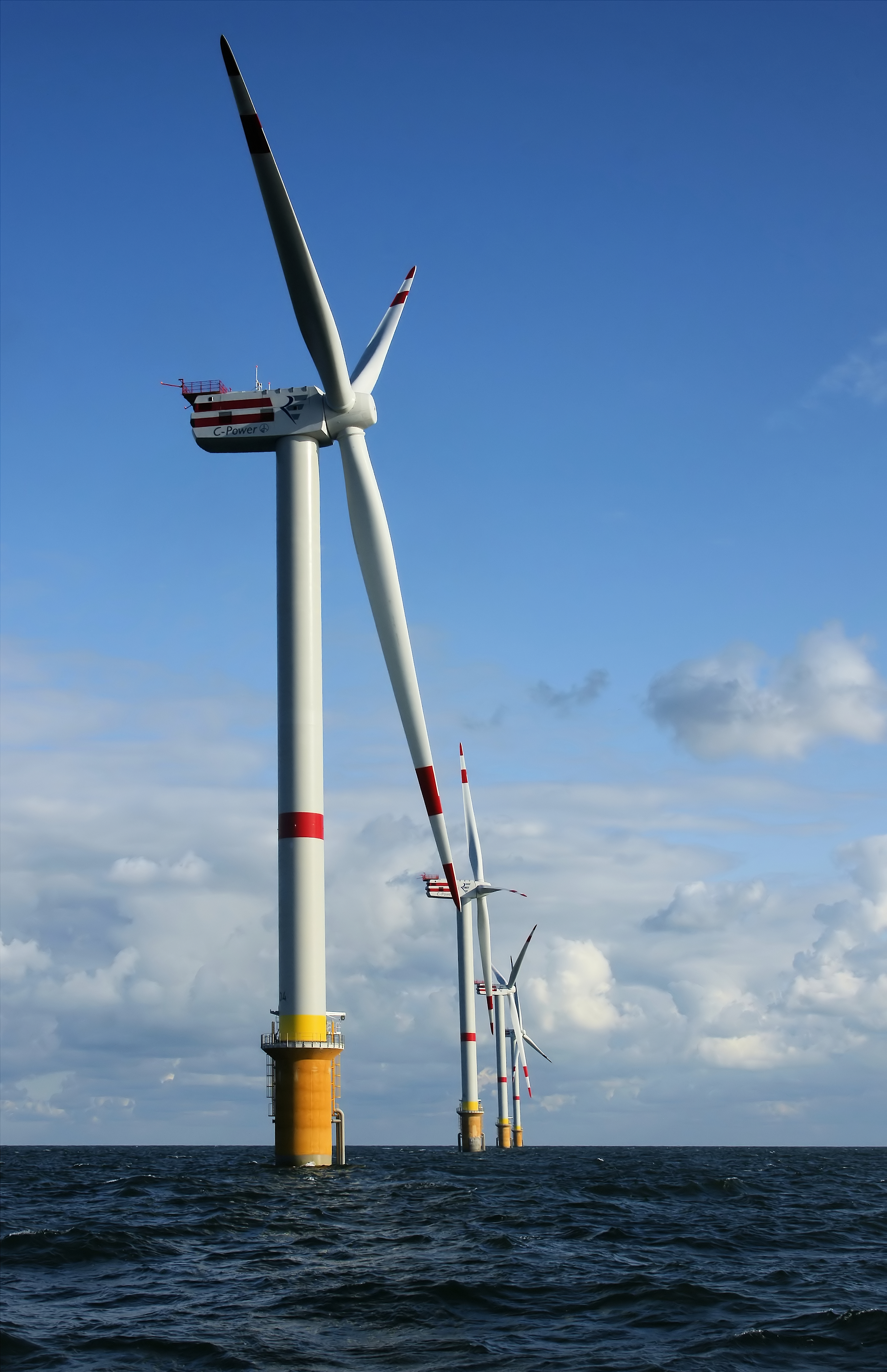
Thorntonbank Wind Farm, using REpower 5M 5 MW turbines in the North Sea off the coast of Belgium

A wind turbine is a device that converts the kinetic energy of wind into electrical energy. As of 2024, hundreds of thousands of large turbines, in installations known as wind farms, were generating over 1,136 gigawatts of power, with 117 GW added each year. Wind turbines are an increasingly important source of intermittent renewable energy, and are used in many countries to lower energy costs and reduce reliance on fossil fuels. One study claimed that, as of 2009, wind had the "lowest relative greenhouse gas emissions, the least water consumption demands and the most favorable social impacts" compared to photovoltaic, hydro, geothermal, coal and gas energy sources.

Wind turbines are manufactured in a wide range of sizes, with either horizontal or vertical axes, though horizontal is most common. Commercial power production horizontal-axis turbines usually have three blades, upwind of their towers. Vertical-axis turbines can be made to varied designs, including the "eggbeater" Darrieus, the giromill with straight blades, the Savonius with scoops suitable for rooftops and ships, airborne with wings tethered to the ground, floating (mounted on a floating platform), and various unconventional types such as with counter-rotating blades.

Blades are most commonly made of glass fiber composites, but carbon fiber which is stiffer, stronger, and less dense is also used. Smaller wind turbines are used for applications such as battery charging and remote devices such as traffic warning signs. Larger turbines can contribute to a domestic power supply while selling unused power back to the utility supplier via the electrical grid.

Wind turbines produce among the cheapest renewable energy, and are clean, emitting no greenhouse gases. They have a significant environmental impact such as on wildlife, but this can be mitigated. The power produced varies with the wind, not with demand, so it is an unreliable source of energy unless energy storage is available.

== History ==
The windwheel of Hero of Alexandria (10–70 CE) marks one of the first recorded instances of wind powering a machine. However, the first known practical wind power plants were built in Sistan, an Eastern province of Persia (now Iran), from the 7th century. These panemone windmills were vertical-axle windmills, which had long vertical drive shafts with rectangular blades. Made of six to twelve sails covered in reed matting or cloth material, these wind turbines were used to grind grain or draw up water, and were used in the gristmilling and sugarcane industries.

Wind power first appeared in Europe during the Middle Ages. The first historical records of its use in England date to the 11th and 12th centuries; there are reports of German crusaders taking their windmill-making skills to Syria around 1190. By the 15th century, Dutch wind pumps were in use to drain low-lying land. Vertical-axis windmills were described by Croatian inventor Fausto Veranzio in his book Machinae Novae (1595).

The first electricity-generating wind turbine was installed by the Austrian Josef Friedländer at the Vienna International Electrical Exhibition in 1883. It was a Halladay wind turbine for driving a dynamo. Friedländer's 6.6 m (22 ft) diameter Halladay "wind motor" was supplied by U.S. Wind Engine & Pump Co. of Batavia, Illinois. The 3.7 kW (5 hp) wind turbine drove a dynamo at ground level that fed electricity into a series of batteries. The batteries powered various electrical tools and lamps, as well as a threshing machine. Friedländer's wind turbine and its accessories were prominently installed at the north entrance to the main exhibition hall (Rotunde) in the Vienna Prater.

In July 1887, Scottish academic James Blyth installed a battery-charging machine to light his holiday home in Marykirk, Scotland. Some months later, American inventor Charles F. Brush was able to build the first automatically operated wind turbine after consulting local University professors and his colleagues Jacob S. Gibbs and Brinsley Coleberd and successfully getting the blueprints peer-reviewed for electricity production. Although Blyth's turbine was considered uneconomical in the United Kingdom, electricity generation by wind turbines was more cost effective in countries with widely scattered populations.

In Denmark by 1900, there were about 2500 windpumps and windmills, producing an estimated combined peak mechanical power of about 30 megawatts (MW). The largest machines were on 24-metre (79 ft) towers with four-bladed 23-metre (75 ft) diameter rotors. By 1908, there were 72 wind-driven electric generators operating in the United States from 5 kilowatts (kW) to 25 kW. Around the time of World War I, American wind turbine makers were producing 100,000 each year, mostly for water-pumping.

By the 1930s, use of wind turbines in rural areas was declining as the distribution system extended to those areas.

A forerunner of modern horizontal-axis wind generators was in service at Yalta, USSR, in 1931. This was a 100 kW generator on a 30-meter (98 ft) tower. It was reported to have an annual capacity factor of 32 percent, not much different from current wind machines.

In the autumn of 1941, the first megawatt-class wind turbine was synchronized to a utility grid in Vermont. The Smith–Putnam wind turbine only ran for about five years before one of the blades snapped off. The unit was not repaired, because of a shortage of materials during the war.

The first utility grid-connected wind turbine to operate in the UK was built by John Brown & Company in 1951 in Orkney.

In the early 1970s, however, anti-nuclear protests in Denmark spurred artisan mechanics to develop microturbines of 22 kW despite declines in the industry. Organizing owners into associations and co-operatives led to the lobbying of the government and utilities and provided incentives for larger turbines throughout the 1980s and later. Local activists in Germany, nascent turbine manufacturers in Spain, and large investors in the United States in the early 1990s then lobbied for policies that stimulated the industry in those countries.

It has been argued that expanding the use of wind power will lead to increasing geopolitical competition over critical materials for wind turbines, including rare earth elements such as neodymium, praseodymium, and dysprosium. However, this perspective has been critically dismissed for failing to relay how most wind turbines do not use permanent magnets and for underestimating the power of economic incentives for the expanded production of these minerals.

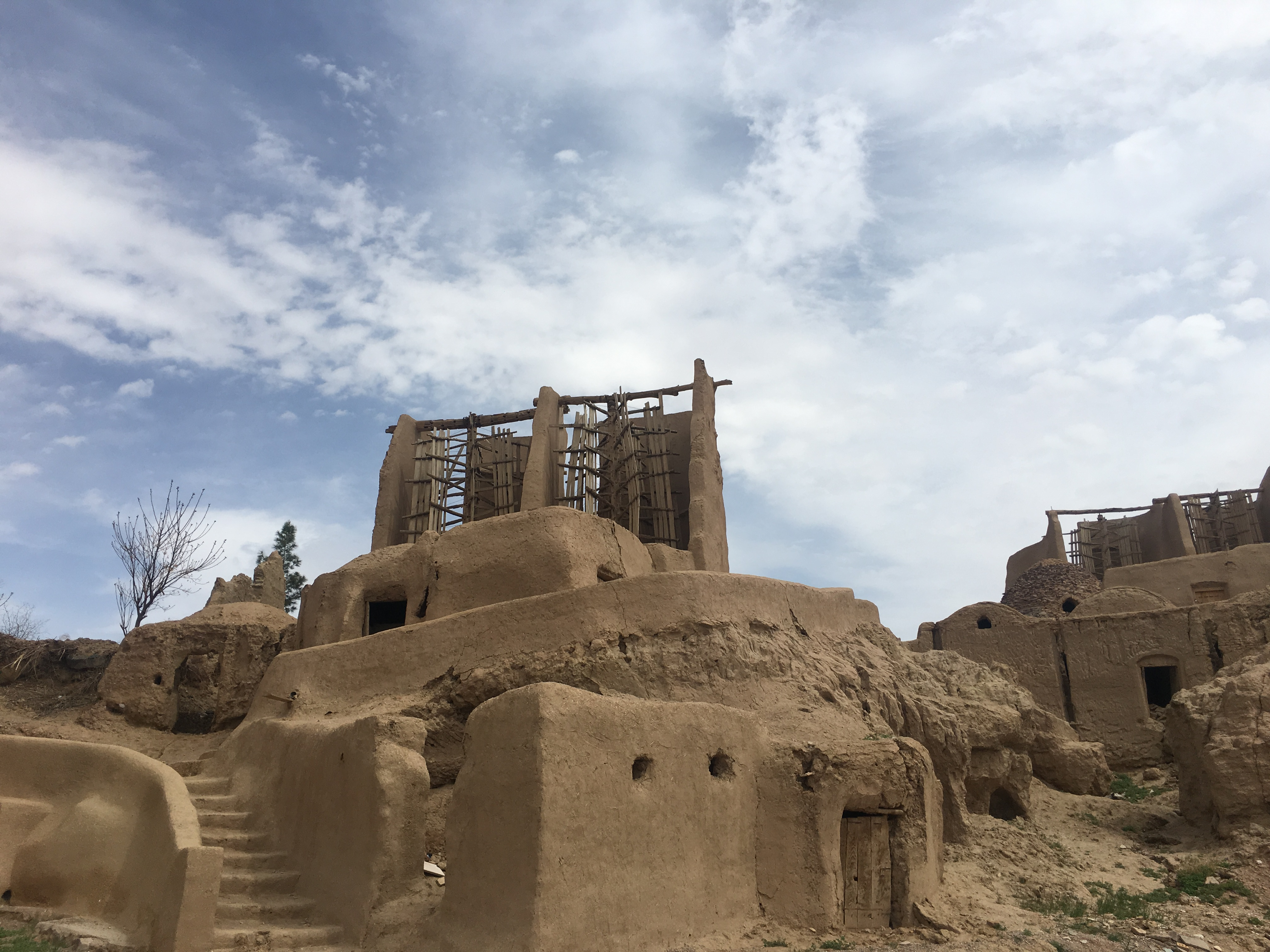
Nashtifan windmills in Sistan, Iran

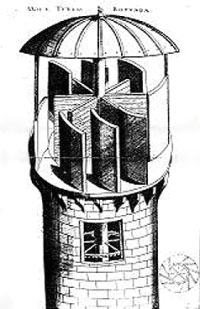
A vertical axis windmill design by Fausto Veranzio, c. 1600

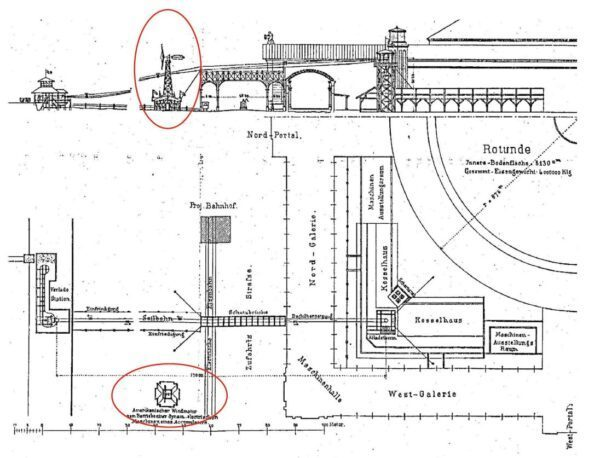
Wind turbine for power generation by Josef Friedländer, Vienna in 1883

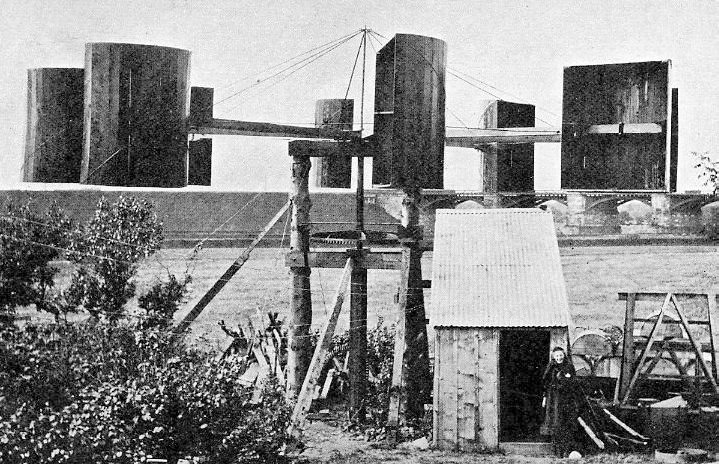
James Blyth's electricity-generating wind turbine, 1891

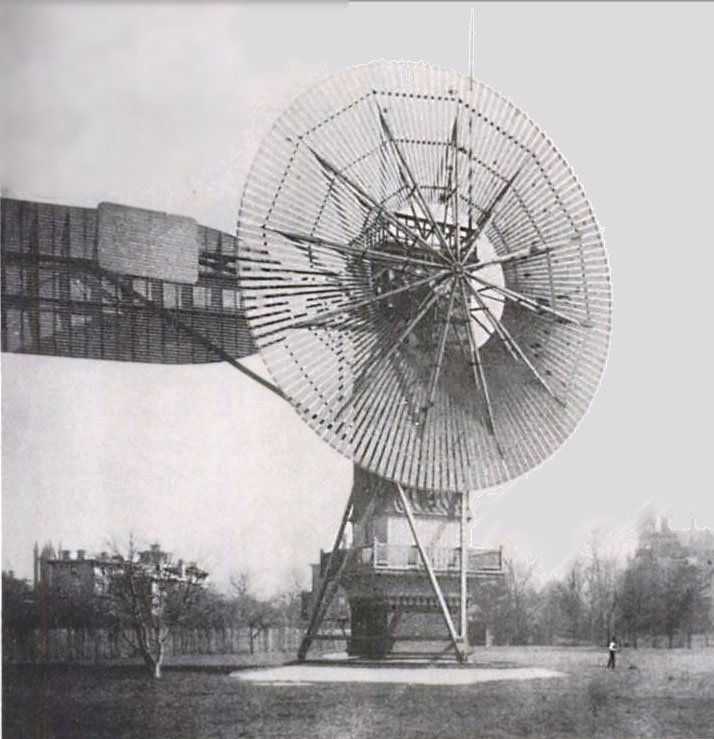
The first automatic wind turbine, built in Cleveland in 1887 by Charles F. Brush

== Wind power density ==
Wind power density (WPD) is a quantitative measure of wind energy available at any location. It is the mean power available per swept area of a turbine, and is calculated for different heights above ground. Calculation of wind power density includes the effect of wind velocity and air density.

Wind turbines are classified by the wind speed they are designed for, from class I to class III, with A to C referring to the turbulence intensity of the wind.

Class	Avg wind speed (m/s)	Turbulence
IA	10	16%
IB	10	14%
IC	10	12%
IIA	8.5	16%
IIB	8.5	14%
IIC	8.5	12%
IIIA	7.5	16%
IIIB	7.5	14%
IIIC	7.5	12%

== Efficiency ==
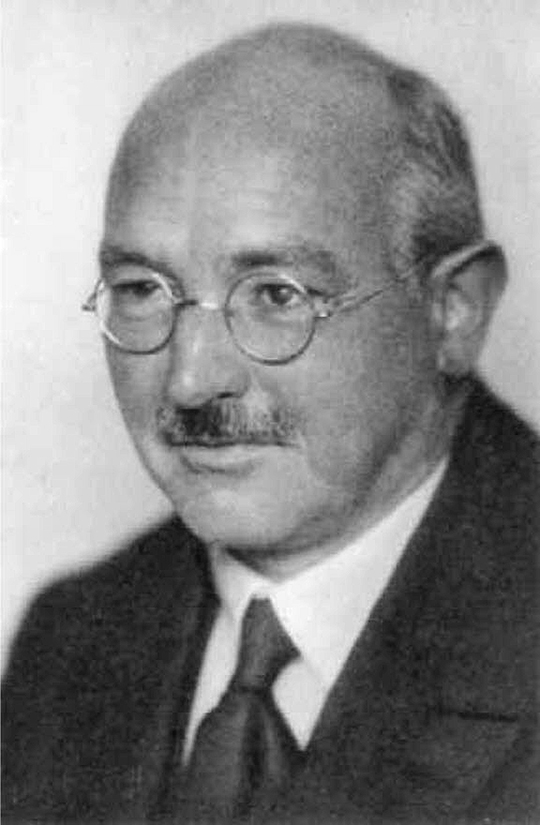
German physicist Albert Betz helped to develop wind turbine technology. Betz's law states that no wind turbine can capture more than 59.3% of the wind's kinetic energy.

Conservation of mass requires that the mass of air entering and exiting a turbine must be equal. Likewise, the conservation of energy requires the energy given to the turbine from incoming wind to be equal to that of the combination of the energy in the outgoing wind and the energy converted to electrical energy. Since outgoing wind will still possess some kinetic energy, there must be a maximum proportion of the input energy that is available to be converted to electrical energy. Accordingly, Betz's law gives the maximal achievable extraction of wind power by a wind turbine, known as Betz's coefficient, as 16/27 (59.3%) of the rate at which the kinetic energy of the air arrives at the turbine.

The maximum theoretical power output of a wind machine is thus 16/27 times the rate at which kinetic energy of the air arrives at the effective disk area of the machine. If the effective area of the disk is A, and the wind velocity v, the maximum theoretical power output P is:

$$P=\frac{16}{27}\frac{1}{2}\rho v^3 A = \frac{8}{27}\rho v^3 A,$$

where ρ is the air density.

Wind-to-rotor efficiency (including rotor blade friction and drag) are among the factors affecting the final price of wind power. Further inefficiencies, such as gearbox, generator, and converter losses, reduce the power delivered by a wind turbine. To protect components from undue wear, extracted power is held constant above the rated operating speed as theoretical power increases as the cube of wind speed, further reducing theoretical efficiency. In 2001, commercial utility-connected turbines delivered 75% to 80% of the Betz limit of power extractable from the wind, at rated operating speed.

Efficiency can decrease slightly over time, one of the main reasons being dust and insect carcasses on the blades, which alter the aerodynamic profile and essentially reduce the lift to drag ratio of the airfoil. Analysis of 3128 wind turbines older than 10 years in Denmark showed that half of the turbines had no decrease, while the other half saw a production decrease of 1.2% per year.

In general, more stable and constant weather conditions (most notably wind speed) result in an average of 15% greater efficiency than that of a wind turbine in unstable weather conditions, thus allowing up to a 7% increase in wind speed under stable conditions. This is due to a faster recovery wake and greater flow entrainment that occur in conditions of higher atmospheric stability. However, wind turbine wakes have been found to recover faster under unstable atmospheric conditions as opposed to a stable environment.

Different materials have varying effects on the efficiency of wind turbines. In an Ege University experiment, three wind turbines, each with three blades with a diameter of one meter, were constructed with blades made of different materials: A glass and glass/carbon epoxy, glass/carbon, and glass/polyester. When tested, the results showed that the materials with higher overall masses had a greater friction moment and thus a lower power coefficient.

The air velocity is the major contributor to the turbine efficiency. This is the reason for the importance of choosing the right location. The wind velocity will be high near the shore because of the temperature difference between the land and the ocean. Another option is to place turbines on mountain ridges. The higher the wind turbine will be, the higher the wind velocity on average. A windbreak can also increase the wind velocity near the turbine.

== Types ==
The three primary types: VAWT Savonius, HAWT towered; VAWT Darrieus as they appear in operation

Wind turbines can rotate about either a horizontal or a vertical axis, the former being both older and more common. They can also include blades or be bladeless. Household-size vertical designs produce less power and are less common.

=== Horizontal axis ===
Large three-bladed horizontal-axis wind turbines (HAWT) with the blades upwind of the tower (i.e. blades facing the incoming wind) produce the overwhelming majority of wind power in the world today. These turbines have the main rotor shaft and electrical generator at the top of a tower and must be pointed into the wind. Small turbines are pointed by a simple wind vane, while large turbines generally use a wind sensor coupled with a yaw system. Most have a gearbox, which turns the slow rotation of the blades into a quicker rotation that is more suitable to drive an electrical generator. Some turbines use a different type of generator suited to slower rotational speed input. These do not need a gearbox and are called direct-drive, meaning they couple the rotor directly to the generator with no gearbox in between. While permanent magnet, direct-drive generators can be more costly due to the rare earth materials required, these gearless turbines are sometimes preferred over gearbox generators because they "eliminate the gear-speed increaser, which is susceptible to significant accumulated fatigue torque loading, related reliability issues, and maintenance costs". There is also the pseudo direct drive mechanism, which has some advantages over the permanent magnet direct drive mechanism.

Most horizontal-axis turbines have their rotors upwind of the supporting tower. Downwind machines have been built, because they do not need an additional mechanism for keeping them in line with the wind. In high winds, downwind blades can also be designed to bend more than upwind ones, which reduces their swept area and thus their wind resistance, mitigating risk during gales. Despite these advantages, upwind designs are preferred, because the pulsing change in loading from the wind as each blade passes behind the supporting tower can cause damage to the turbine.

Turbines used in wind farms for commercial production of electric power are usually three-bladed. These have low torque ripple, which contributes to good reliability. The blades are usually colored white for daytime visibility by aircraft and range in length from 20 to 80 meters (66 to 262 ft). The size and height of turbines increase year by year. Offshore wind turbines are built up to 26 MW today and have a blade length up to 153 meters (502 ft), while onshore turbines reach up to 15 MW of capacity and 131 meters (430 ft) of blade length. The average hub height of horizontal-axis wind turbines is 103 meters (338 ft) for onshore turbines in the U.S. and 124 meters (407 ft) for global offshore turbines.

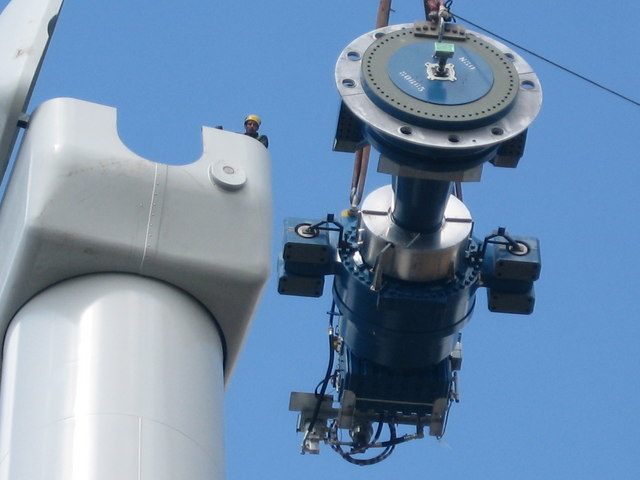
Components of a horizontal-axis wind turbine (gearbox, rotor shaft and brake assembly) being lifted into position

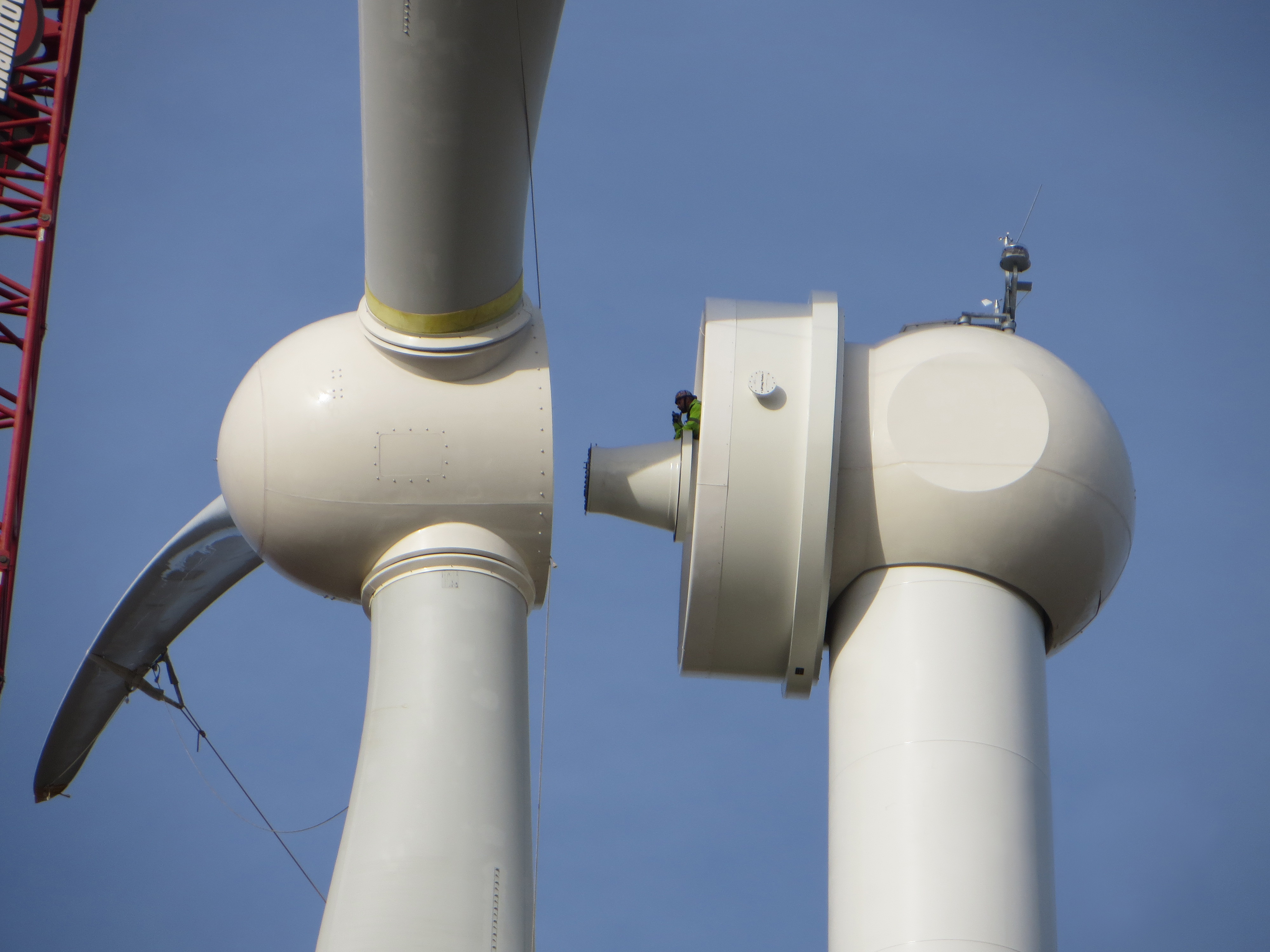
The rotor of a gearless wind turbine being set. This particular turbine was prefabricated in Germany, before being shipped to the U.S. for assembly.

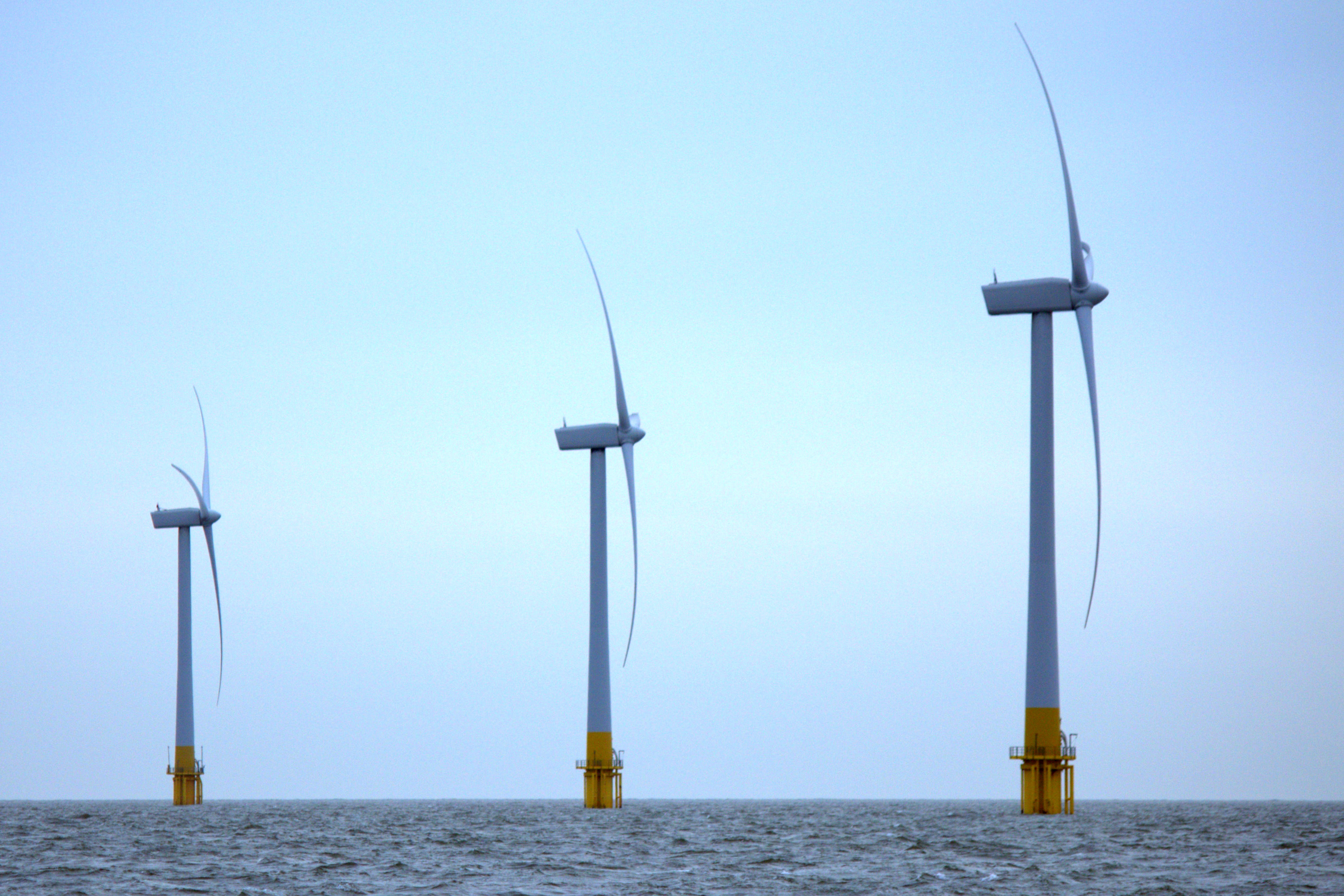
Offshore horizontal-axis wind turbines (HAWTs) at Scroby Sands Wind Farm, England

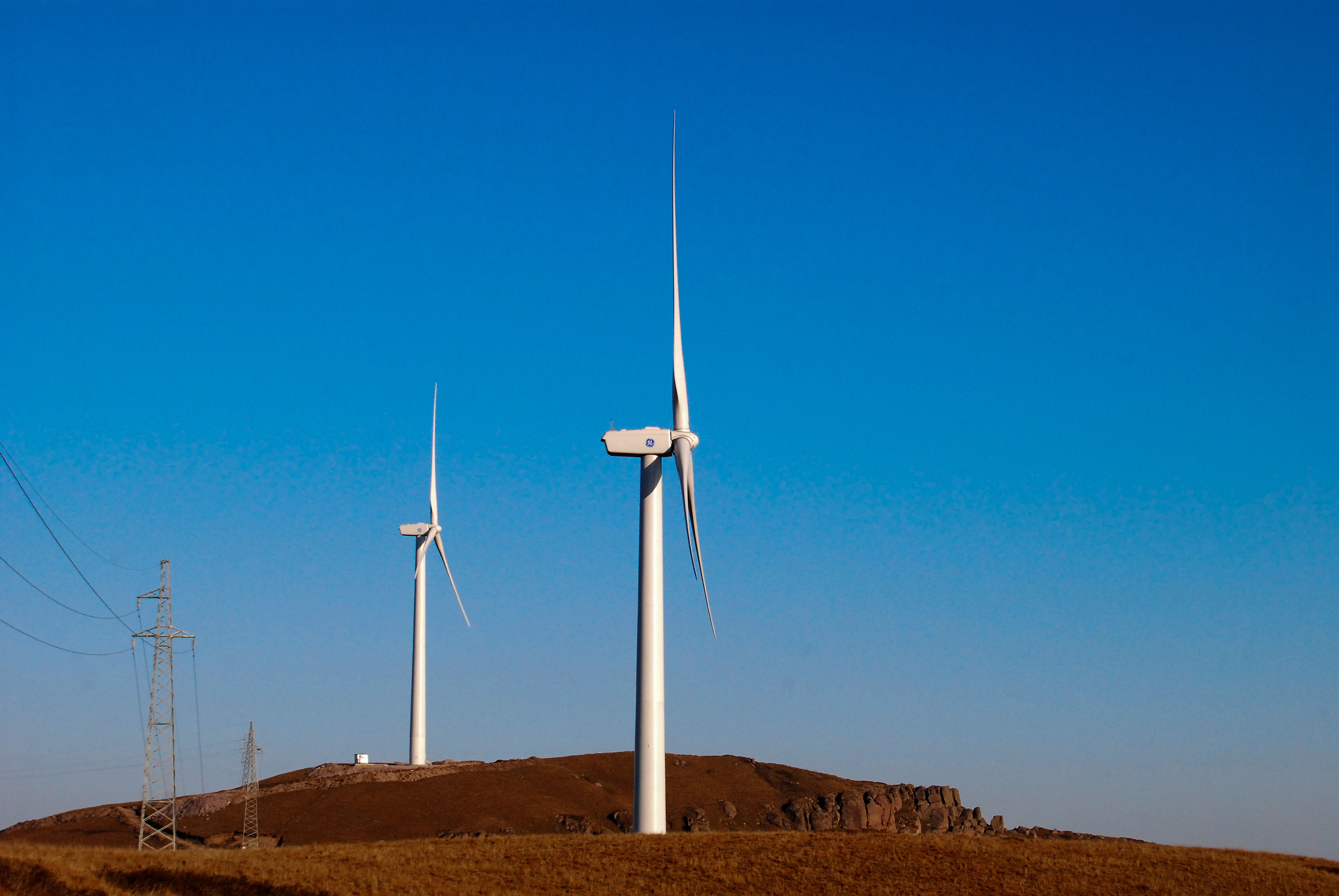
Onshore horizontal-axis wind turbines in Zhangjiakou, Hebei, China

=== Vertical axis ===
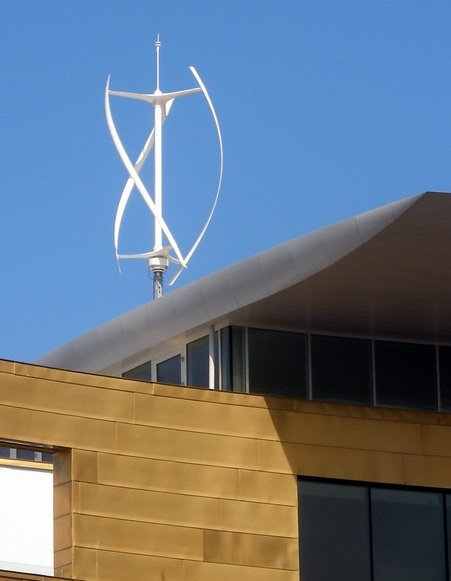
A small Quietrevolution QR5 Gorlov-type vertical-axis wind turbine on top of the Bristol Beacon in Bristol, England. Measuring 3 m in diameter and 5 m high, it has a nameplate rating of 6.5 kW to the grid.

Vertical-axis wind turbines (or VAWTs) have the main rotor shaft arranged vertically. One advantage of this arrangement is that the turbine does not need to be pointed into the wind to be effective, which is an advantage on a site where the wind direction is highly variable. It is also an advantage when the turbine is integrated into a building because it is inherently less steerable. Also, the generator and gearbox can be placed near the ground, using a direct drive from the rotor assembly to the ground-based gearbox, improving accessibility for maintenance. However, these designs produce much less energy averaged over time, which is a major drawback.

Vertical turbine designs have much lower efficiency than standard horizontal designs. The key disadvantages include the relatively low rotational speed with the consequential higher torque and hence higher cost of the drive train, the inherently lower power coefficient, the 360-degree rotation of the aerofoil within the wind flow during each cycle and hence the highly dynamic loading on the blade, the pulsating torque generated by some rotor designs on the drive train, and the difficulty of modelling the wind flow accurately and hence the challenges of analysing and designing the rotor prior to fabricating a prototype.

When a turbine is mounted on a rooftop the building generally redirects wind over the roof and this can double the wind speed at the turbine. If the height of a rooftop-mounted turbine tower is about half of the building height it is near the optimum for maximum wind energy and minimum wind turbulence. While wind speeds within the built environment are generally much lower than at exposed rural sites, noise may be a concern and an existing structure must be able to resist the additional stress.

There are several subtypes of the vertical-axis design, including the Darrieus wind turbine, also known as an eggbeater turbine. These were named for Georges Jean Marie Darrieus who patented a design in the 1920s. They have good efficiency, but produce large torque ripple and cyclical stress on the tower, which contributes to poor reliability. The torque ripple is reduced by using three or more blades, which results in greater solidity of the rotor. The giromill is a subtype of Darrieus turbine with straight blades. The cycloturbine variety has variable pitch to reduce the torque pulsation and is self-starting. The advantages of variable pitch are high starting torque; a wide, relatively flat torque curve; a higher coefficient of performance; more efficient operation in turbulent winds; and a lower blade speed ratio, which lowers blade bending stresses. Straight, V, or curved blades may be used.

A vertical-axis twisted-Savonius-type turbine

The Savonius wind turbine are drag-type devices with two (or more) scoops that are used in anemometers, Flettner vents (commonly seen on bus and van roofs), and in some high-reliability low-efficiency power turbines. They are always self-starting if there are at least three scoops. Twisted Savonius is a modified Savonius with long helical scoops to provide smooth torque. This is often used as a rooftop wind turbine and has even been adapted for ships. Airborne wind turbines consist of wings or a small aircraft tethered to the ground. They are useful for reaching faster winds above which traditional turbines can operate. There are prototypes in operation in east Africa. A floating wind turbine is an offshore turbine supported by a floating platform. By having them float, they can to be installed in deeper water, allowing more of them; by having them further out of sight from land, they may create less public concern about their visual impact.

=== Unconventional types ===
Counter-rotating wind turbine

Vertical-axis wind turbine offshore

Light pole wind turbine

== Design and construction ==
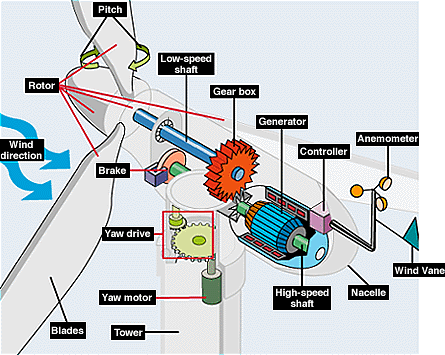
Components of a horizontal-axis wind turbine

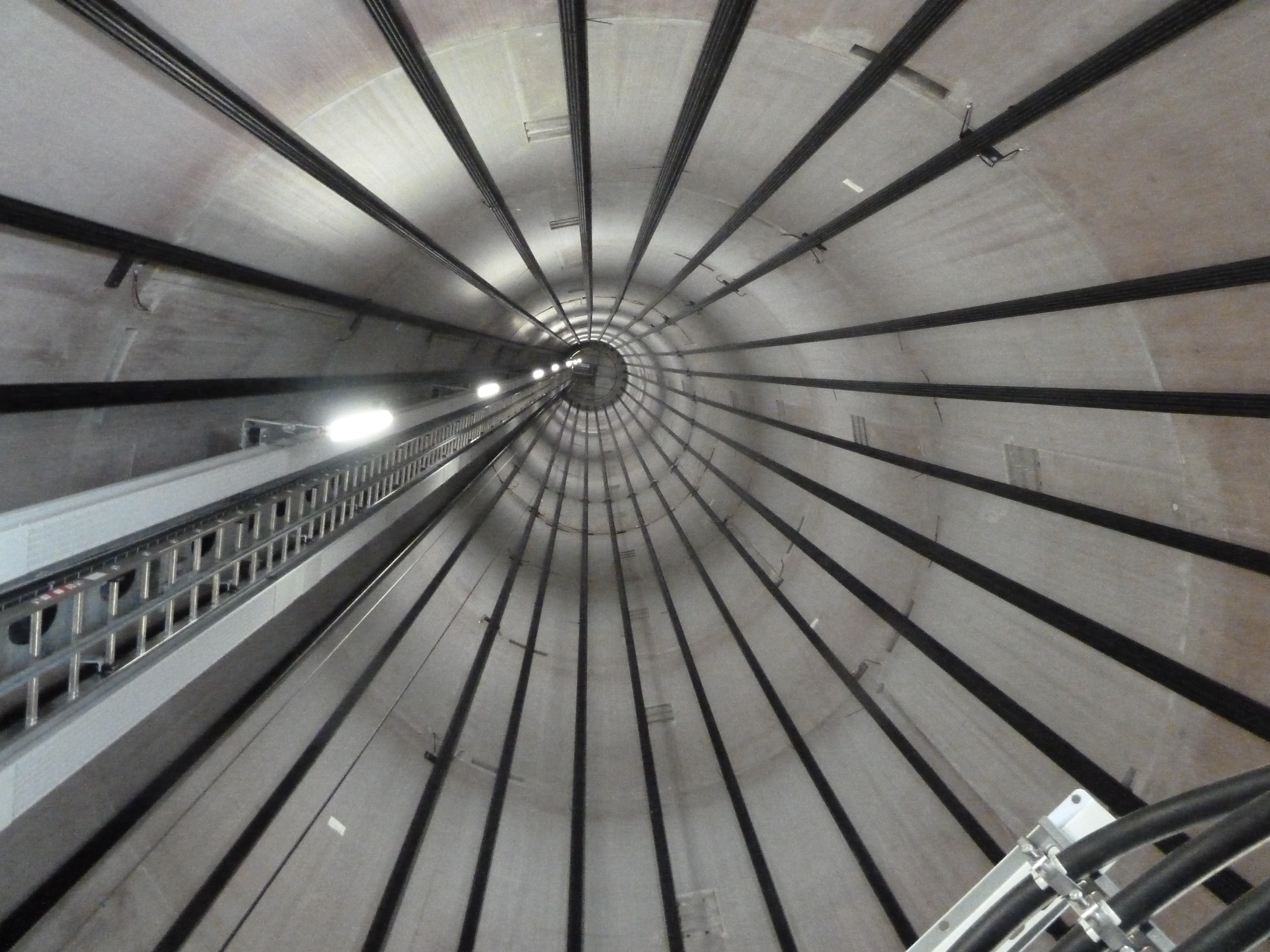
Inside view of a wind turbine tower, showing the tendon cables

=== Components ===
Wind turbines convert wind energy to electrical energy for distribution. Conventional horizontal-axis turbines can be divided into three components:

- The rotor, which is approximately 20% of the wind turbine cost, includes the blades for converting wind energy to low-speed rotational energy.
- The generator, which is approximately 34% of the wind turbine cost, includes the electrical generator, the control electronics, and most likely a gearbox (e.g., planetary gear box), adjustable-speed drive, or continuously variable transmission to convert the low-speed incoming rotation to high-speed rotation suitable for generating electricity.
- The surrounding structure, which is approximately 15% of the wind turbine cost, includes the tower and rotor yaw mechanism.

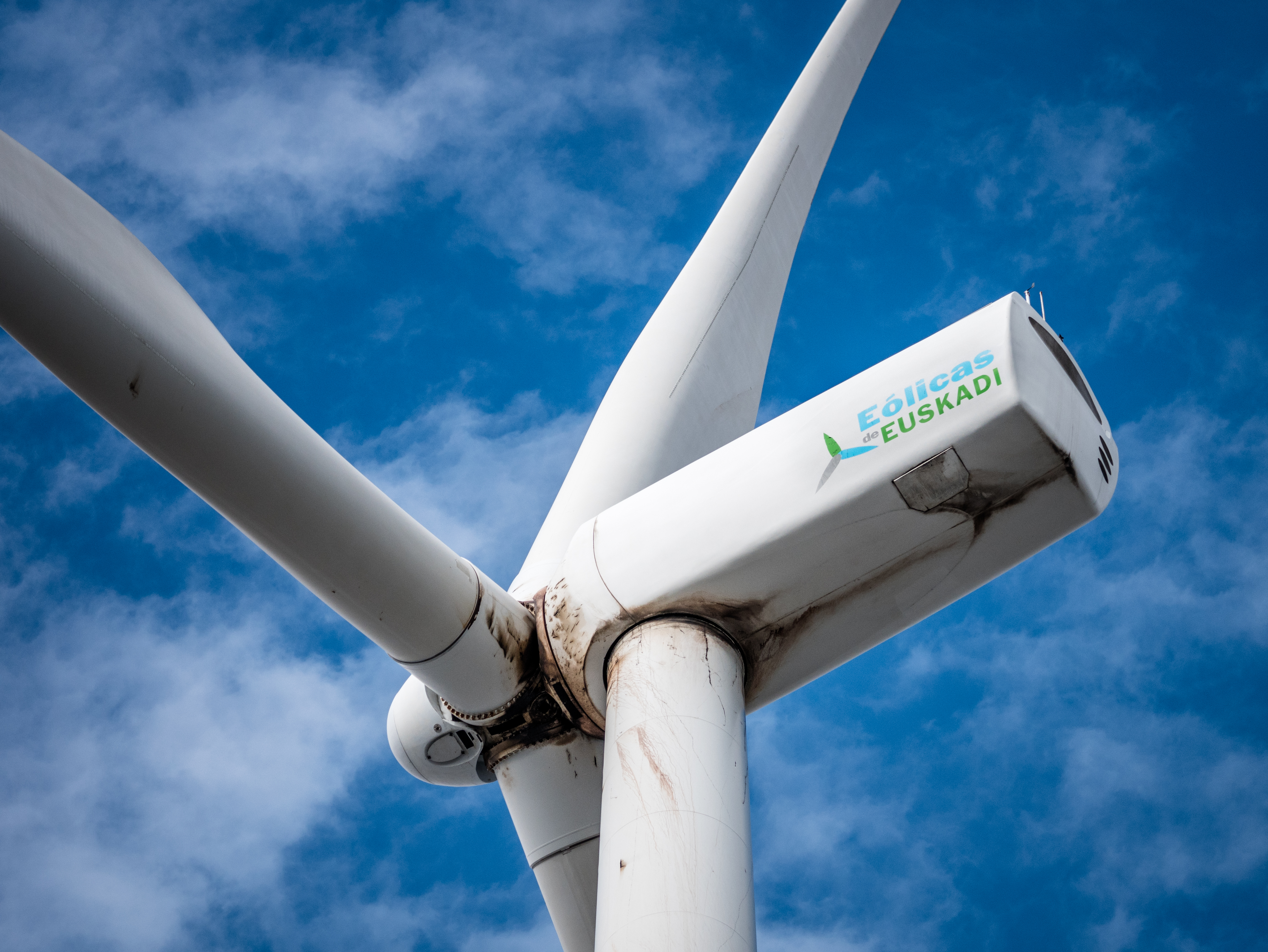
Nacelle of a wind turbine

A 1.5 (MW) wind turbine of a type frequently seen in the United States has a tower 80 meters (260 ft) high. The rotor assembly (blades and hub) measures about 80 meters (260 ft) in diameter. The nacelle, which contains the generator, is 15.24 meters (50.0 ft) and weighs around 300 tons.

=== Turbine monitoring and diagnostics ===
Due to data transmission problems, structural health monitoring of wind turbines is usually performed using several accelerometers and strain gages attached to the nacelle to monitor the gearbox and equipment. Currently, digital image correlation and stereophotogrammetry are used to measure dynamics of wind turbine blades. These methods usually measure displacement and strain to identify location of defects. Dynamic characteristics of non-rotating wind turbines have been measured using digital image correlation and photogrammetry. Three dimensional point tracking has also been used to measure rotating dynamics of wind turbines.

== Technology ==
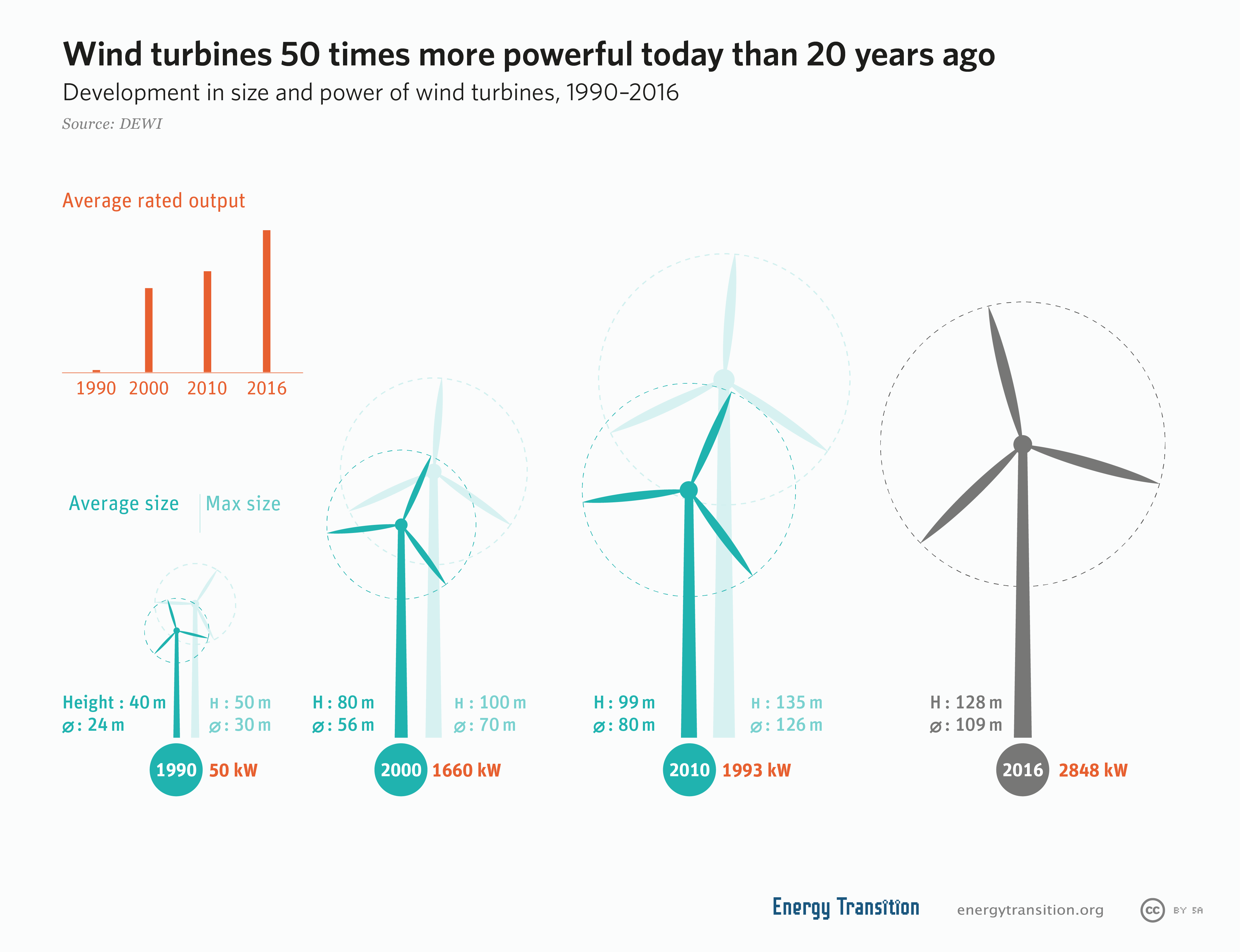
Development in size and power of wind turbines, 1990–2016

Generally, efficiency increases along with turbine blade lengths. The blades must be stiff, strong, durable, light and resistant to fatigue. Materials with these properties include composites such as polyester and epoxy, while glass fiber and carbon fiber have been used for the reinforcing. Construction may involve manual layup or injection molding. Retrofitting existing turbines with larger blades reduces the task and risks of redesign.

While turbines have an average lifespan of 30 years, blades and gearboxes usually last up to 25 years.

=== Blade materials ===
Materials commonly used in wind turbine blades are described below.

==== Glass and carbon fibers ====
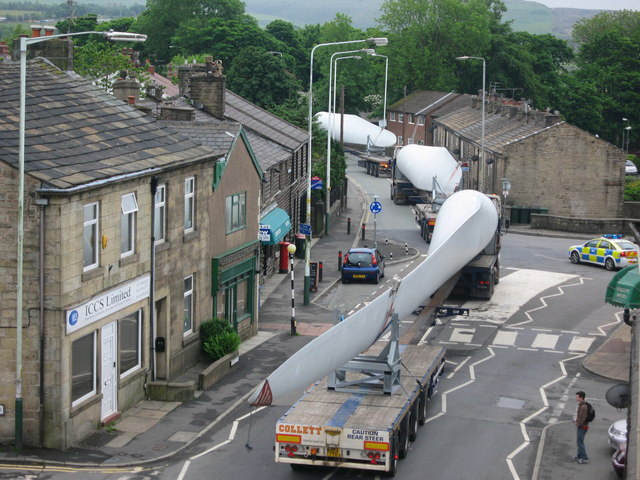
A turbine blade convoy passing through Edenfield, England

The stiffness of composites is determined by the stiffness of fibers and their volume content. Typically, E-glass fibers are used as main reinforcement in the composites. Typically, the glass/epoxy composites for wind turbine blades contain up to 75% glass by weight. This increases the stiffness, tensile and compression strength. A promising composite material is glass fiber with modified compositions like S-glass, R-glass etc. Other glass fibers developed by Owens Corning are ECRGLAS, Advantex and WindStrand.

Carbon fiber has more tensile strength, higher stiffness and lower density than glass fiber. An ideal candidate for these properties is the spar cap, a structural element of a blade that experiences high tensile loading. A 100-metre (330 ft) glass fiber blade could weigh up to 50 tonnes (110,000 lb), while using carbon fiber in the spar saves 20% to 30% weight, about 15 tonnes (33,000 lb).

==== Hybrid reinforcements ====
Instead of making wind turbine blade reinforcements from pure glass or pure carbon, hybrid designs trade weight for cost. For example, for an 8-metre (26 ft) blade, a full replacement by carbon fiber would save 80% of weight but increase costs by 150%, while a 30% replacement would save 50% of weight and increase costs by 90%. Hybrid reinforcement materials include E-glass/carbon, E-glass/aramid. The current longest blade by LM Wind Power is made of carbon/glass hybrid composites. More research is needed about the optimal composition of materials.

==== Nano-engineered polymers and composites ====
Additions of small amount (0.5 weight %) of nanoreinforcement (carbon nanotubes or nanoclay) in the polymer matrix of composites, fiber sizing or inter-laminar layers can improve fatigue resistance, shear or compressive strength, and fracture toughness of the composites by 30% to 80%. Research has also shown that incorporating small amounts of carbon nanotubes (CNT) can increase the lifetime up to 1500%.

=== Costs ===
The global weighted average capital cost of a wind turbine was approximately $2,324 per kilowatt in 2010. As of 2024, this figure had fallen to $1,041 per kilowatt of nameplate capacity, reflecting a consistent year-on-year decline of around 12%. Home wind turbines are significantly cheaper, with costs as little as $700 for a small 400 W turbine (non-including installation costs) in the U.S.

The levelized cost of energy (LCOE) of wind turbines, or the average minimum price per unit of energy a power plant must receive to break even over its lifetime, as of 2025 spanned from $25 per MWh in China to $70 per MWh in Vietnam, and averaged globally around $50–60 per MWh. The MENA region reported the lowest average LCOE, with the 2024 Al Ghat wind farm project in Saudi Arabia setting a global record of only $15.66 per MWh.

For the wind turbine blades, while the material cost is much higher for hybrid glass/carbon fiber blades than all-glass fiber blades, labor costs can be lower. Using carbon fiber allows simpler designs that use less raw material. The chief manufacturing process in blade fabrication is the layering of plies. Thinner blades allow reducing the number of layers and thus the labor and in some cases, equate to the cost of labor for glass fiber blades.

Offshore has significantly higher installation costs. The global weighted average total installation costs for offshore turbines were $2,852 per kW in 2024, having fallen by 48% from the 2010 costs of $5,518 per kW.

=== Non-blade materials ===
Wind turbine parts other than the rotor blades (including the rotor hub, gearbox, frame, and tower) are largely made of steel. Smaller turbines (as well as megawatt-scale Enercon turbines) have begun using aluminum alloys for these components to make turbines lighter and more efficient. This trend may grow if fatigue and strength properties can be improved. Pre-stressed concrete has been increasingly used for the material of the tower, but still requires much reinforcing steel to meet the strength requirement of the turbine. Additionally, step-up gearboxes are being increasingly replaced with variable speed generators, which requires magnetic materials.

Modern turbines use some two tons of copper for wiring, generators, transformers, and grounding systems due to its exceptional electrical conductivity and durability. As of 2018, global production of wind turbines use 450,000 tonnes (990 million pounds) of copper per year. As of 2025, copper intensity ranges between 650 and 6,200 kg per MW of capacity.

=== Material supply ===
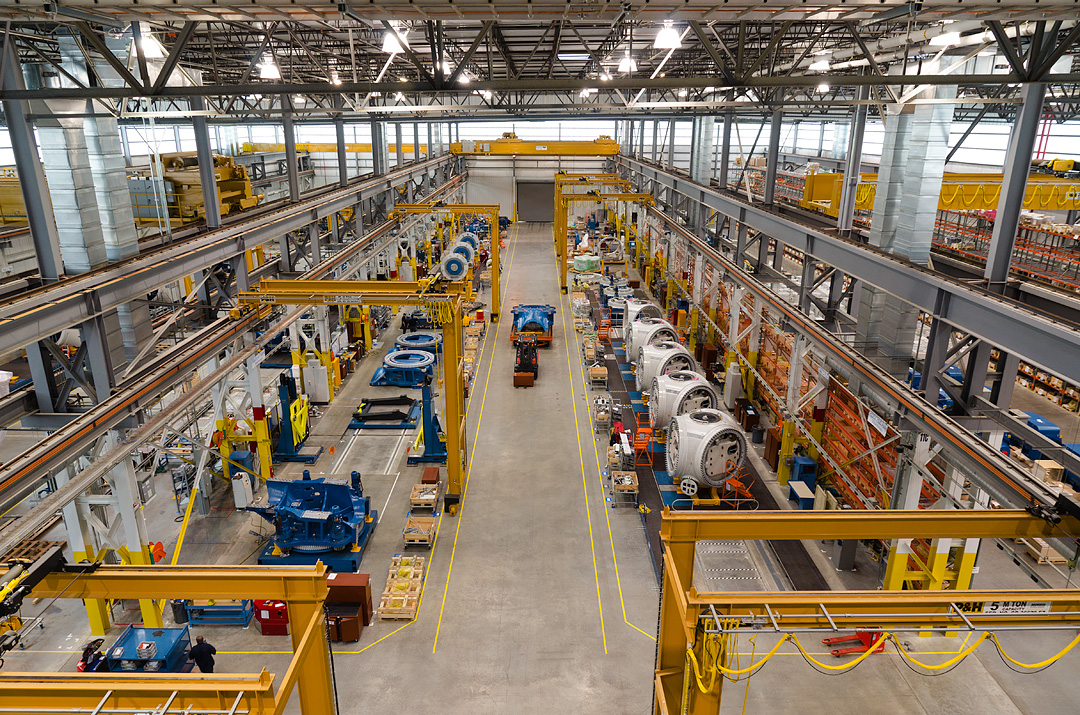
Nordex wind turbine manufacturing plant in Jonesboro, Arkansas, United States

A 2015 study of the material consumption trends and requirements for wind energy in Europe found that bigger turbines have a higher consumption of precious metals but lower material input per kW generated. The material consumption and stock at that time was compared to input materials for various onshore system sizes. In all EU countries, the estimates for 2020 doubled the values consumed in 2009. These countries would need to expand their resources to meet the estimated demand for 2020. For example, the EU had 3% of world supply of fluorspar, and it would require 14% by 2020. Globally, the main exporting countries are South Africa, Mexico, and China. This is similar to other critical and valuable materials required for energy systems such as magnesium, silver and indium. While the levels of recycling of these materials are very low, focusing on their circularity could alleviate supply. Since most of these valuable materials are also used in other emerging technologies, like light emitting diodes (LEDs), photo voltaics (PVs) and liquid crystal displays (LCDs), their demand is expected to grow.

A 2011 study by the United States Geological Survey estimated resources required to fulfill the US commitment to supplying 20% of its electricity from wind power by 2030. It did not consider requirements for small turbines or offshore turbines because those were not common in 2008 when the study was done. Common materials such as cast iron, steel and concrete would increase by 2%–3% compared to 2008. Between 110,000 and 115,000 metric tons of fiber glass would be required per year, a 14% increase. Rare-earth metal use would not increase much compared to available supply, however rare-earth metals that are also used for other technologies such as batteries which are increasing its global demand need to be taken into account. Land required would be 50,000 square kilometers onshore and 11,000 offshore. This would not be a problem in the US due to its vast area and because the same land can be used for farming. A greater challenge would be the variability and transmission to areas of high demand.

Permanent magnets for wind turbine generators contain rare-earth metals such as neodymium (Nd), praseodymium (Pr), terbium (Tb), and dysprosium (Dy). Systems that use magnetic direct drive turbines require greater amounts of rare-earth metals. Therefore, an increase in wind turbine manufacture would increase the demand for these resources. By 2035, the demand for Nd is estimated to increase by 4,000 to 18,000 tons and for Dy by 200 to 1,200 tons. These values are a quarter to half of current production. However, these estimates are very uncertain because technologies are developing rapidly.

Reliance on rare earth minerals for components has risked expense and price volatility as China has been main producer of rare earth minerals (96% in 2009) and was reducing its export quotas. However, in recent years, other producers have increased production and China has increased export quotas, leading to higher supply, lower cost, and greater viability of large-scale use of variable-speed generators.

Glass fiber is the most common material for reinforcement. Its demand has grown due to growth in construction, transportation and wind turbines. Its global market might reach US$17.4 billion by 2024, compared to US$8.5 billion in 2014. In 2014, Asia Pacific produced more than 45% of the market; now China is the largest producer. The industry receives subsidies from the Chinese government allowing it to export cheaper to the US and Europe. However, price wars have led to anti-dumping measures such as tariffs on Chinese glass fiber.

== Wind turbines on public display ==
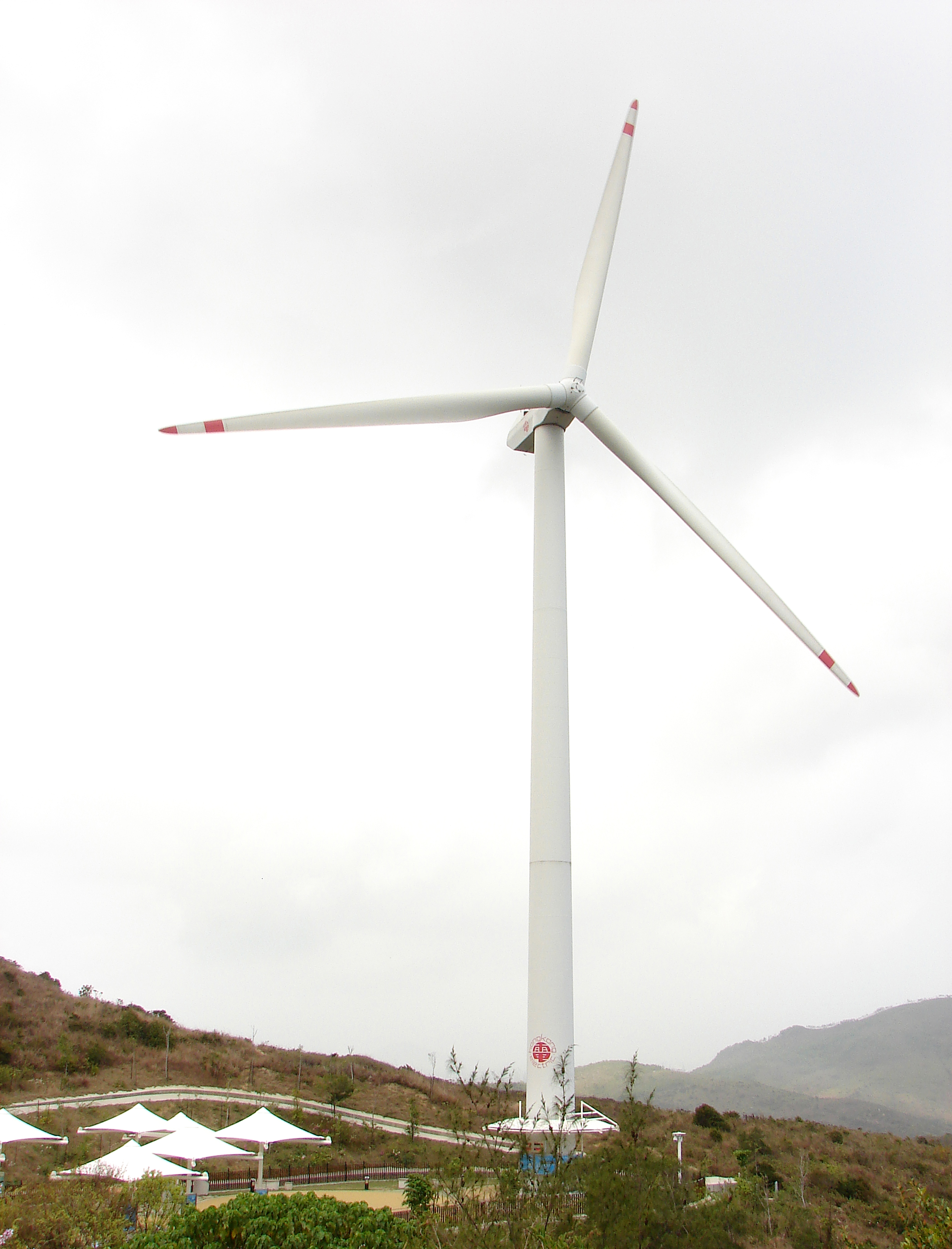
The Nordex N50 wind turbine and visitor centre of Lamma Winds in Hong Kong, China

Wind turbines in the Bahrain World Trade Center

A few localities have exploited the attention-getting nature of wind turbines by placing them on public display, either with visitor centers around their bases, or with viewing areas farther away. The wind turbines are generally of conventional horizontal-axis, three-bladed design and generate power to feed electrical grids, but they also serve the unconventional roles of technology demonstration, public relations, and education. The Bahrain World Trade Center has wind turbines displayed prominently for the public. It is the first skyscraper to integrate wind turbines into its design.

== Small wind turbines ==
Small wind turbines may be used for a variety of applications including on- or off-grid residences, telecom towers, offshore platforms, rural schools and clinics, remote monitoring and other purposes that require energy where there is no electric grid, or where the grid is unstable. Small wind turbines may be as small as a fifty-watt generator for boat or caravan use. Hybrid solar- and wind-powered units are increasingly being used for traffic signage, particularly in rural locations, since they avoid the need to lay long cables from the nearest mains connection point. The U.S. Department of Energy's National Renewable Energy Laboratory (NREL) defines small wind turbines as those smaller than or equal to 100 kilowatts. Small units often have direct-drive generators, direct current output, aeroelastic blades, and lifetime bearings and use a vane to point into the wind.

== Wind turbine spacing ==
On most horizontal wind turbine farms, a spacing of about 6–10 times the rotor diameter is often upheld. However, for large wind farms, distances of about 15 rotor diameters should be more economical, taking into account typical wind turbine and land costs. This conclusion has been reached by research conducted by Charles Meneveau of Johns Hopkins University and Johan Meyers of Leuven University in Belgium, based on computer simulations that take into account the detailed interactions among wind turbines (wakes) as well as with the entire turbulent atmospheric boundary layer.

Research by John Dabiri of Caltech suggests that vertical wind turbines may be placed much more closely together so long as an alternating pattern of rotation is created allowing blades of neighbouring turbines to move in the same direction as they approach one another.

== Operability ==
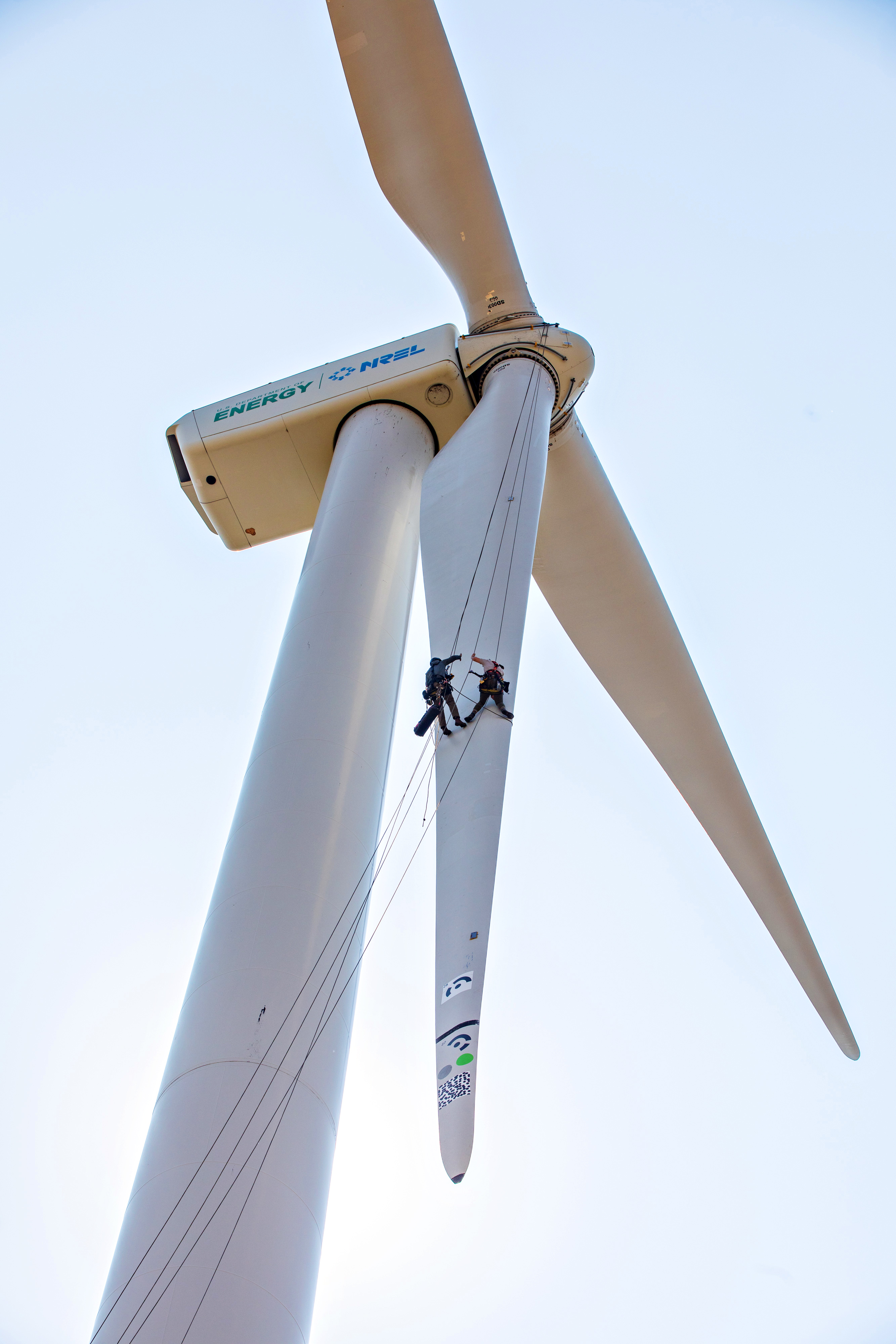
Workers inspect wind turbine blades.

=== Maintenance ===
Wind turbines need regular maintenance to stay reliable and available. In the best case turbines are available to generate energy 98% of the time. Ice accretion on turbine blades has been found to greatly reduce the efficiency of wind turbines, which is a common challenge in cold climates where in-cloud icing and freezing rain events occur. Deicing is mainly performed by internal heating or, in some cases, by helicopters or drones spraying clean warm water on the blades.

Modern turbines usually have a small onboard crane for hoisting maintenance tools and minor components. However, large, heavy components like generators, gearboxes, blades, and so on are rarely replaced, and a heavy lift external crane is needed in those cases. If the turbine has a difficult access road, a containerized crane can be lifted up by the internal crane to provide heavier lifting.

=== Repowering ===
Installation of new wind turbines can be controversial. An alternative is repowering, where existing wind turbines are replaced with bigger, more powerful ones, sometimes in smaller numbers while keeping or increasing capacity.

=== Demolition and recycling ===
Some wind turbines which are out of use are recycled or repowered. 85% of turbine materials are easily reused or recycled, but the blades, made of a composite material, are more difficult to process.

Interest in recycling blades varies in different markets and depends on the waste legislation and local economics. A challenge in recycling blades is related to the composite material, which is made of fiberglass with carbon fibers in epoxy resin, which cannot be remolded to form new composites.

Wind farm waste is less toxic than other garbage. Wind turbine blades represent only a fraction of overall waste in the US, according to the wind-industry trade association, American Wind Energy Association.

Several utilities, startup companies, and researchers are developing methods for reusing or recycling blades. Manufacturer Vestas has developed technology that can separate the fibers from the resin, allowing for reuse. In Germany, wind turbine blades are commercially recycled as part of an alternative fuel mix for a cement factory. In the United Kingdom, a project will trial cutting blades into strips for use as rebar in concrete, with the aim of reducing emissions in the construction of High Speed 2. Used wind turbine blades have been recycled by incorporating them as part of the support structures within pedestrian bridges in Poland and Ireland. In 2026, Chinese manufacturer Ming Yang developed the first fully recyclable wind turbine, which uses pultruded carbon fiber panels instead of fiberglass, allowing recyclers to separate the components through a chemical process.

== Comparison with other power sources ==
=== Advantages ===
Wind turbines is one of the lowest-cost sources of renewable energy along with solar panels. As technology needed for wind turbines continued to improve, the prices decreased as well. In addition, there is currently no competitive market for wind energy (though there may be in the future), because wind is a freely available natural resource, most of which is untapped. The main cost of small wind turbines is the purchase and installation process, which averages between $48,000 and $65,000 per installation. Usually, the total amount of energy harvested amounts to more than the cost of the turbines.

Wind turbines provide a clean energy source, use little water, emitting no greenhouse gases and no waste products during operation. Over 1,400 tonnes (1,500 short tons) of carbon dioxide per year can be eliminated by using a one-megawatt turbine instead of one megawatt of energy from a fossil fuel.

=== Disadvantages ===
In the U.S. cats kill on the order of 10,000 times as many birds as wind turbines.

Environmental impact of wind power includes effect on wildlife, but can be mitigated if proper strategies are implemented. Thousands of birds, including rare species, have been killed by the blades of wind turbines, though wind turbines contribute relatively insignificantly to anthropogenic avian mortality (birds killed by humans). Wind farms and nuclear power plants are responsible for between 0.3 and 0.4 bird deaths per gigawatt-hour (GWh) of electricity while fossil fuel power stations are responsible for about 5.2 fatalities per GWh. In comparison, conventional coal-fired generators contribute significantly more to bird mortality. A study on recorded bird populations in the United States from 2000 to 2020 found the presence of wind turbines had no significant effect on bird population numbers.

Energy harnessed by wind turbines is variable, and is not a "dispatchable" source of power; its availability is based on whether the wind is blowing, not whether electricity is needed. Turbines can be placed on ridges or bluffs to maximize the access of wind they have, but this also limits the locations where they can be placed. In this way, wind energy is not a particularly reliable source of energy. However, it can form part of the energy mix, which also includes power from other sources. Technology is also being developed to store excess energy, which can then make up for any deficits in supplies.

The noise of wind turbines means that in UK they are not allowed within 500m of residential buildings for a turbine up to 100kW and 1,000m for larger turbines.

Wind turbines have blinking lights that warn aircraft, to avoid collisions. Residents living near windfarms, especially those in rural areas, have complained that the blinking lights are a bothersome form of light pollution. A light mitigation approach involves Aircraft Detection Lighting Systems (ADLSs) by which the lights are turned on, only when the ADLS's radar detects aircraft within thresholds of altitude and distance.

== Records ==
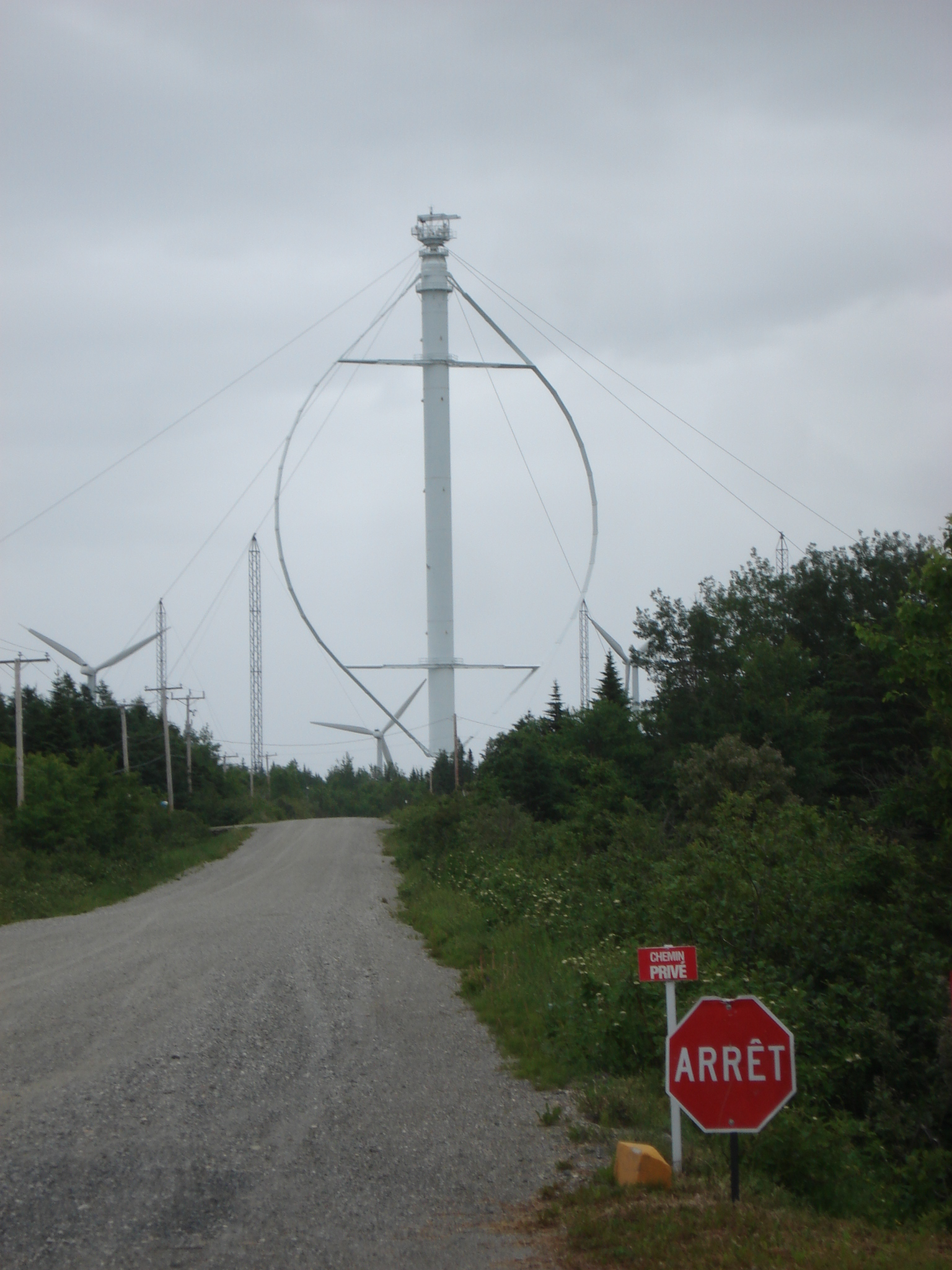
Éole, the largest vertical-axis wind turbine, in Cap-Chat, Quebec, Canada

Record	Model/name	Location	Constructor/manufacturer
Largest and most powerful	DEC 26MW H26-313	Fuzhou, China	Dongfang Electric Wind Power
Largest vertical-axis	Éole	Cap-Chat, Québec, Canada	NRC, Hydro-Québec
Largest one-blade turbine	Monopteros M50	Jade Wind Park	MBB Messerschmitt
Largest two-blade turbine	SCD6.5	Longyuan Wind Farm	Ming Yang Smart Energy
Most rotors	Four-in-One	Maasvlakte, Netherlands	Lagerwey
Highest-situated	2.5	Pastoruri Glaicer	WindAid
Largest offshore	MySE18.X-20MW	Hainan, China	Ming Yang Smart Energy
Tallest	Schipkau GICON Wind Turbine	Schipkau, Germany	Vensys, GICON

== Wind turbines with special constructive features ==
The following wind turbines have special constructive features, but use turbines commercially available

Installation	Country	Town	Coordinates	Type	Power	Nacelle height	Rotor diametre	inauguration	Special feature	Remarks
Schipkau GICON Wind Turbine	Germany	Schipkau	51.508300 N 13.862300 E	Vensys 126	3.8 MW	300 m	126.2 m	2026	Retractable lattice tower	Tallest wind turbine in the world
WP Gaildorf WEA03	Germany	Gaildorf	49.002769 N 9.806424 E	GE 3.6	3.63 MW	172.18 m	137 m	2017	Water Tower as basement	
WP Gaildorf WEA04	Germany	Gaildorf	48.997089 N 9.809825 E	GE 3.6	3.63 MW	166.48 m	137 m	2017	Water Tower as basement	
WP Gaildorf WEA05	Germany	Gaildorf	48.991817 N 9.812078 E	GE 3.6	3.63 MW	173.48 m	137 m	2017	Water Tower as basement	
Weissandt-Gölzau Wind Turbine	Germany	Südliches Anhalt	51.666492 N 12.084218 O	Enercon E-66/18.70	1.8 MW	103 m	66 m	2005	Installed on a former chimney	
Wind of Change	Sweden	Skara	58.338085 N 13.351543 E	Vestas V90-2.0MW	2 MW	105 m	90 m	2023	Wooden tower	
Hannover-Marienwerder Wind Turbine	Germany	Hannover	52.419699 N 9.625383 E	Vensys 77	1.5 MW	100 m	77 m	2012	Wooden tower	
Glatten Wind Turbine	Germany	Glatten	48.445022 N 8.530135 O	Enercon E-40/6.44	1.5 MW	77.5 m	44 m	2000	FM broadcasting transmitter installed	
Windfang Turbine, (Euro Wind Park)	Germany	Aachen, Vetschau Mountain	50.806667 N 6.02055 E	Enercon E-66 15.66	1.5 MW	67 m	66 m	1999	Observation deck	
Südkronsberg E-66 Wind Turbine	Germany	Hannover, Kronsberg	52.316717 N 9.838595 E	Enercon E-66 15.66	1.8 MW	64.8 m	70 m	2000	Observation deck	
Holtriem Observation Wind Turbine	Germany	Westerholt	53.581073 N 7.475381 E	Enercon E-66 1.5	1.5 MW	67 m	66 m	1998	Observation deck	
Lichtenegg Wind Turbine	Austria	Lichtenegg	47.608611 N 16.203611 E	Enercon E-66	1.8 MW	65 m	70 m	2003	Observation deck	
Bruck an der Leitha Observation Wind Turbine	Austria	Bruck an der Leitha	48.032756 N 16.732553 E	Enercon E66/18.70	1.8 MW	65 m	70 m	2000	Observation deck	
Zoetermeer Enron 1.5 Wind Turbine	Netherlands	Zoetermeer	52.042657 N 4.517492 E	Enron 1.5 s	1.5 MW	85 m	70 m	2000	Observation deck	demolished in 2014
Ecotech Swaffham Wind Turbine	United Kingdom	Swaffham	52.656838 N 0.683395 E	Enercon E66/1.5	1.5 MW	67 m	66 m	1999	Observation deck	
Eye of the Wind	Canada	Vancouver, Grouse Mountain	49.387457 N 123.073861 W	Leitwind LTW77-1500	1.5 MW	65 m	76.8 m	2010	Observation deck	
Vestas Risø Quadruple Rotor Wind Turbine	Denmark	Roskilde	55.685102 N 12.096985 E	Vestas V-29 (4x)	225 kW (4x)	29 m ; 59.5 m	29 m	2016	4 Vestas V-29 wind turbines installed in two levels on the same tower	demolished in 2019
Lagerwey Maasvlakte Multirotor Wind Turbine	Netherlands	Rotterdam	51.960493 N 4.018333 E	Lagerwey LW15/75 (6x)	75 kW (6x)		15 m	1986	originally 6 Lagerwey LW15/75 wind turbines installed in three levels on the same tower. In 1987 after storm damage one crossbar with 2 turbines was removed	demolished between 2005 and 2009
Marthalen Landi-Silo Wind Turbine	Switzerland	Marthalen	47.635595 N 8.655529 E	AV-7	6.5 kW	50 m	12 m	2002	Rooftop wind turbine not designed for this purpose	

== Timeline of the tallest wind turbine in the world ==
Development of world's tallest wind turbine since 2006. Please expand and correct, if necessary

Installation	Country	Town	Coordinates	Type	Power	Nacelle height	Rotor diametre	Total height	Time of World record	Remarks
Ewiger Fuhrmann Vestas V66 Wind Turbine	Germany	Kreuztal	51.023302 N 7.951051 E	Vestas V66	1650 kW	117 m	66 m	150 m	2000-2006	Lattice Tower
Fuhrländer Wind Turbine Laasow	Germany	Vetschau	51.720871 N 14.106778 E	Fuhrländer FL 2500	2500 kW	160 m	90 m	205 m	2006-2012	Lattice Tower
Nowy Tomyśl Wind Turbines	Poland	Paproć	52.293819 N 16.149546 E ; 52.294494 N 16.156130 E	Fuhrländer FL 2500	2500 kW	160 m	100 m	210 m	2012-2014	Two lattice towers
MHI Vestas V164	Denmark	Østerild	57.078534 N 8.883986 E	Vestas V164-8.0	8000 kW	140 m	164 m	222 m	2014-2016	
Hausbay Nordex N131/3300 Wind Turbine	Germany	Hausbay	50.116223 N 7.544453 E	Nordex N131/3300	3300 kW	164 m	131 m	229.5 m	2016-2017	
WP Gaildorf WEA05	Germany	Gaildorf	48.991817 N 9.812078 E	GE 3.6	3630 kW	173.48 m	137 m	241.98 m	2017-2019	Water Tower as basement
Haliade-X	Netherlands	Rotterdam	51.962366 N 4.011898 E	GE Haliade-X	12000 kW	150 m	220 m	260 m	2019-2026	
Schipkau GICON Wind Turbine	Germany	Schipkau	51.508300 N 13.862300 E	Vensys 126	3800 kW	300 m	126.2 m	363.1 m	2026	Retractable Lattice Tower

== See also ==
- Wind turbine design
- Compact wind acceleration turbine
- Éolienne Bollée
- IEC 61400
- Renewable energy
- Tidal stream generator
- Unconventional wind turbines
- Wind lens
- Windbelt
- Windpump
