= Liftra =

Engineering Company

A self-hoisting crane changing a gear box.

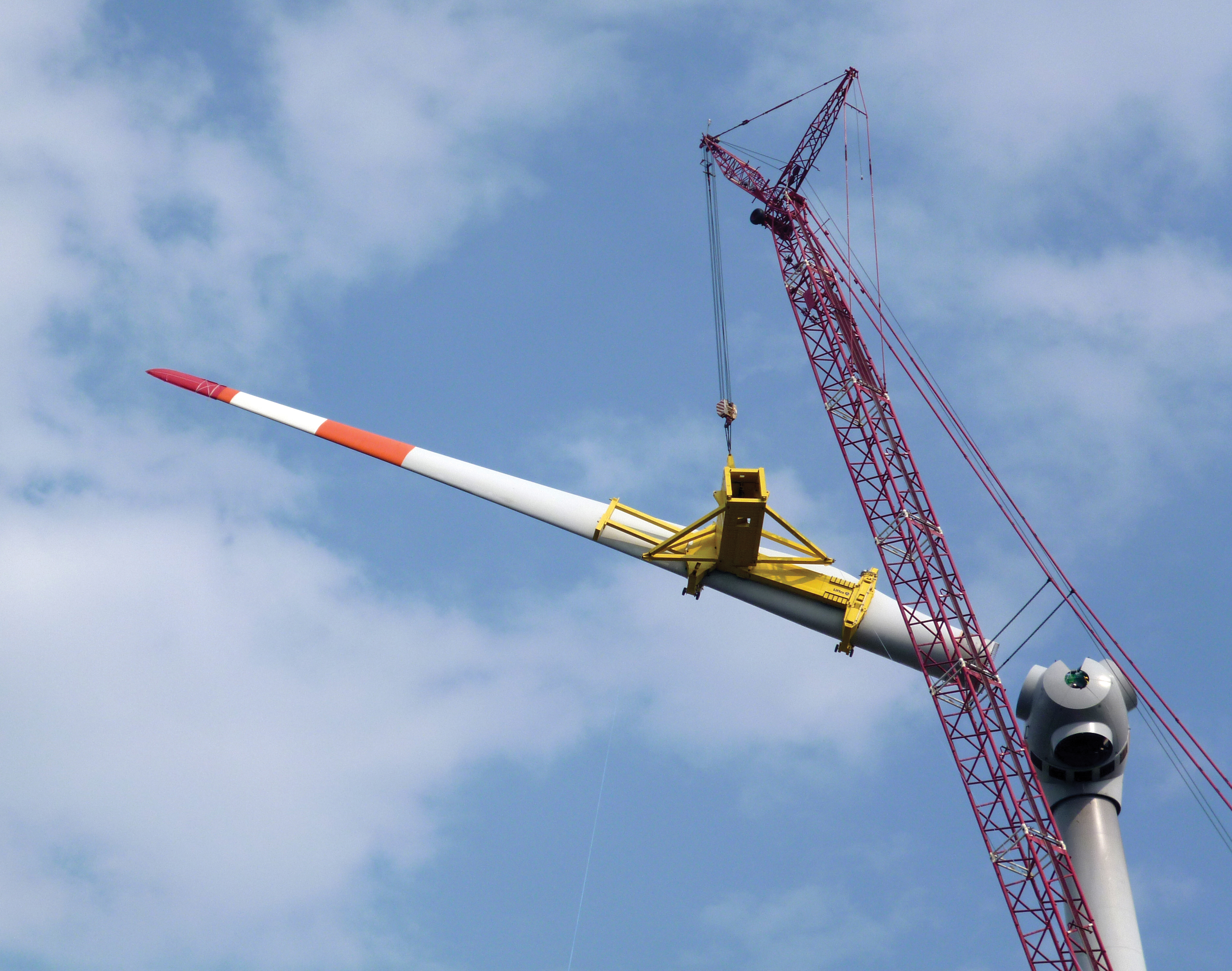
A Liftra crane installing a single blade on a wind turbine hub.

Liftra is an engineering company which specializes in lifting and transport equipment for the global wind turbine industry.

== Overview ==
Liftra's most notable product is a self-hoisting crane used for major component exchange.

The company has assisted in the development of larger wind turbines in the North Sea, along with Belgium-based DEME Offshore.

== Location ==
Liftra is based in Aalborg, Denmark, with offices in the United States, Spain, China and Poland.

== See also ==
- Lifting hook
