= Schipkau GICON Wind Turbine =

365 metre (1,198 ft) tall wind turbine in Germany

GICON tower reached final height end of September 2026

Schipkau GICON Wind Turbine is a wind turbine that was built near Schipkau, Brandenburg, Germany, between Klettwitz-North and Klettwitz-South wind farms. Schipkau GICON Wind Turbine, is the tallest wind turbine in the world and the second tallest structure in Germany. Construction for the turbine started on September 19, 2024, and was finished in September 2026.

The original design was made by GDR engineer Horst Bendix (1930-2023), who had constructed, among others, Bucket-wheel excavators and cranes to build the Berlin TV tower.

It consists of a 300-metre (980 ft) lattice tower, on which a Vensys 126 wind turbine with a nominal power of 3.8 MW and a rotor diameter of 126 metres (413 ft) is installed. Including the hub, the total height of the structure is 365 metres (1,198 ft).

As no currently existing crane is available to lift the machine cabinet with the generator to a height of 300 meters, the tower of the system, designed by GICON, consists of two parts: a fixed outer tower and an internal structure, which can be moved vertically. For assembling the machine cabinet and for later maintenance work, the inner structure was lowered so far that a suitable crane could reach the top of the tower.
After this work was completed, the inner structure was raised up to the desired height.

Location of Wind turbine in Schipkau (Germany)
