= Nacelle (wind turbine) =

Generator housing at the top of a wind turbine tower

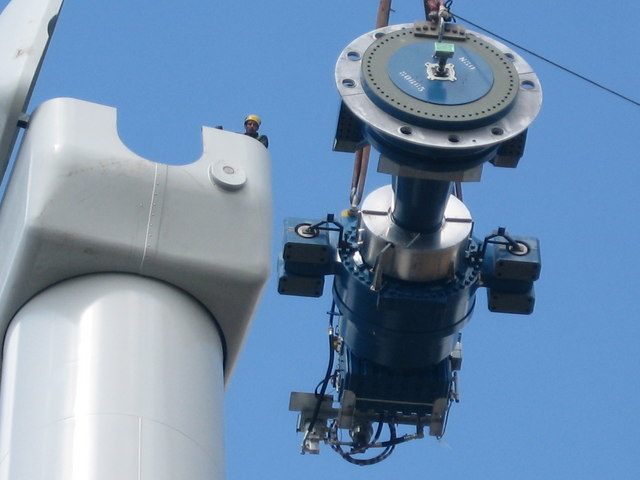
Components of a horizontal axis wind turbine (gearbox, rotor shaft and brake assembly) being lifted into the nacelle.

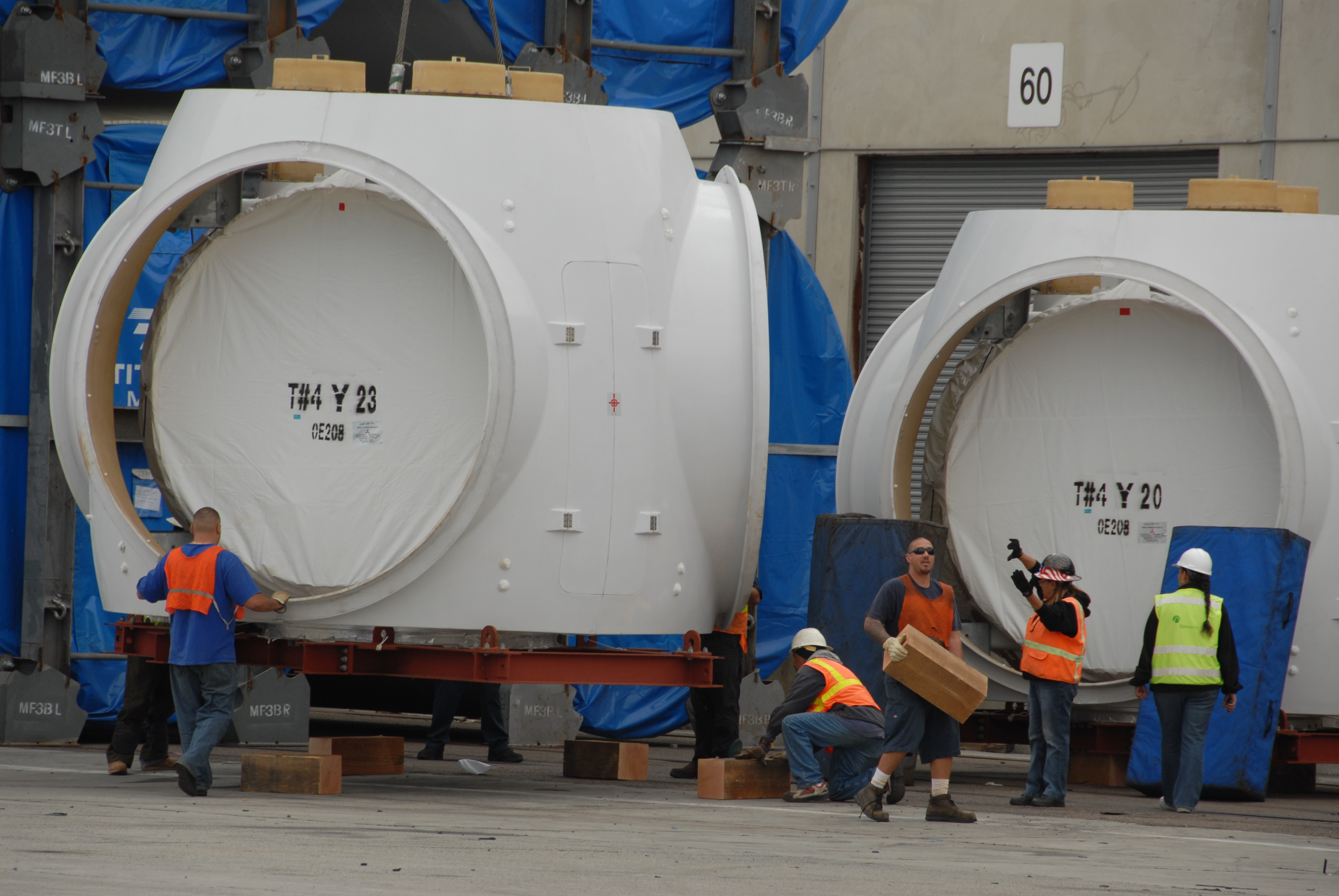
200-ton wind turbine rotor hubs that will be installed at the forward end of the nacelles.

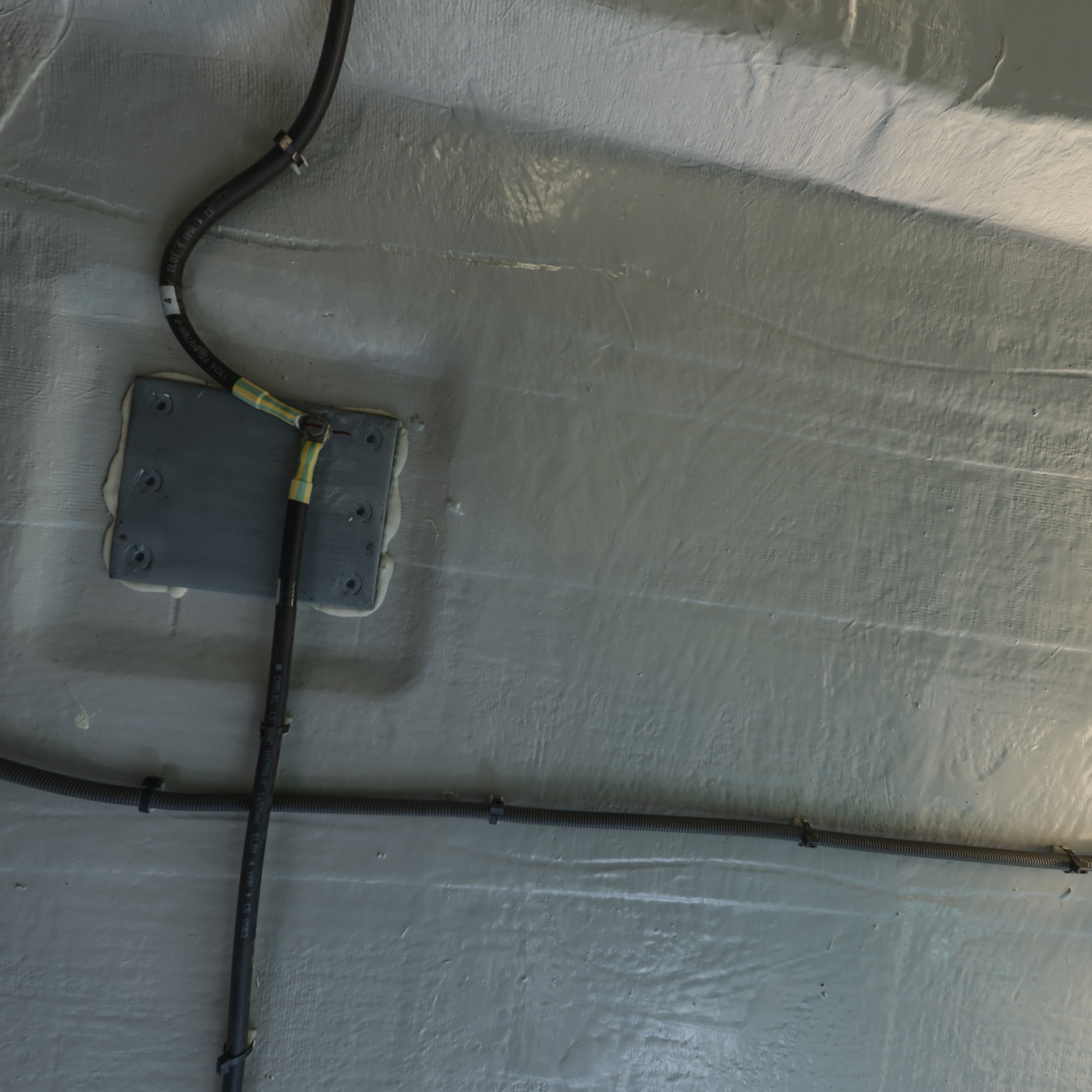
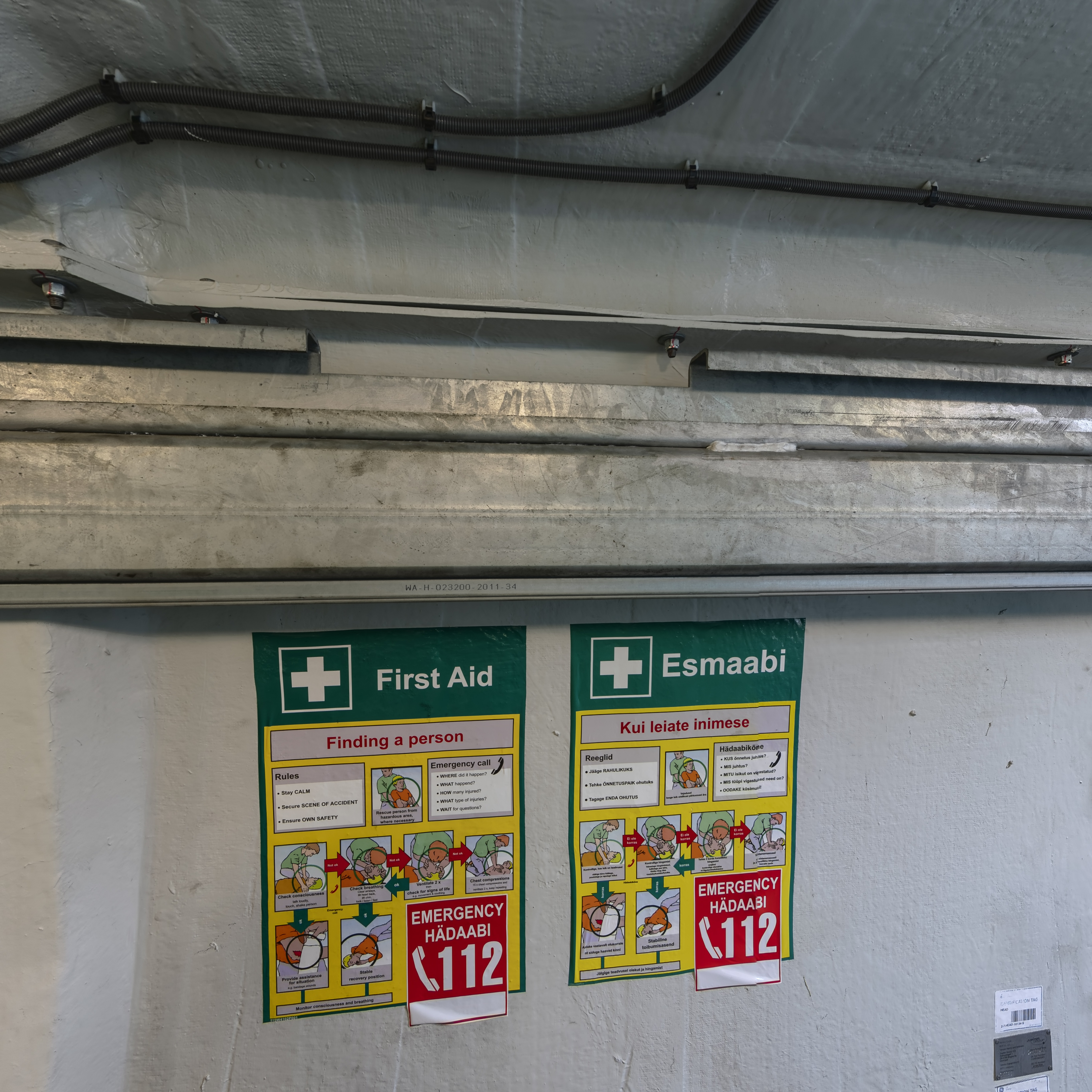
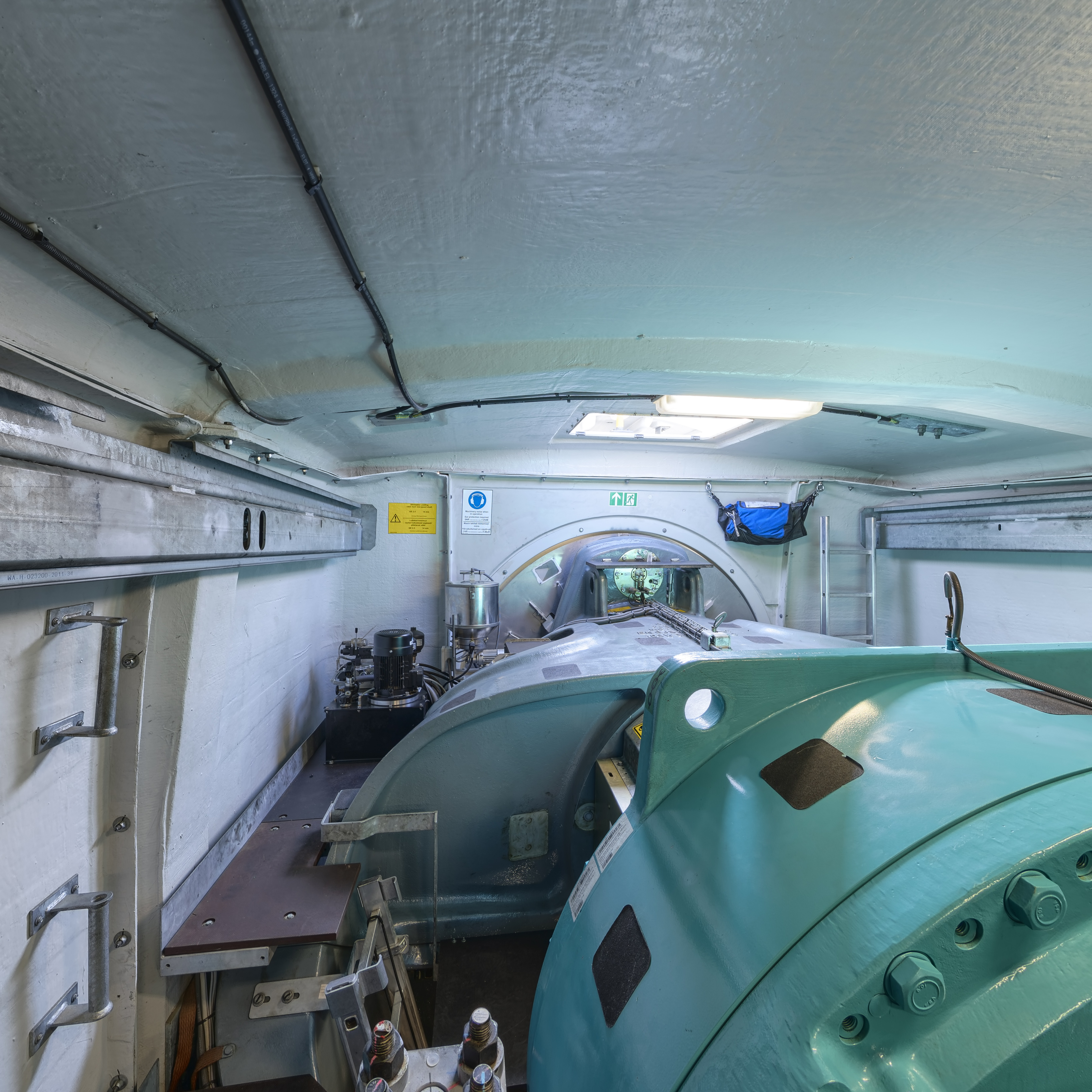
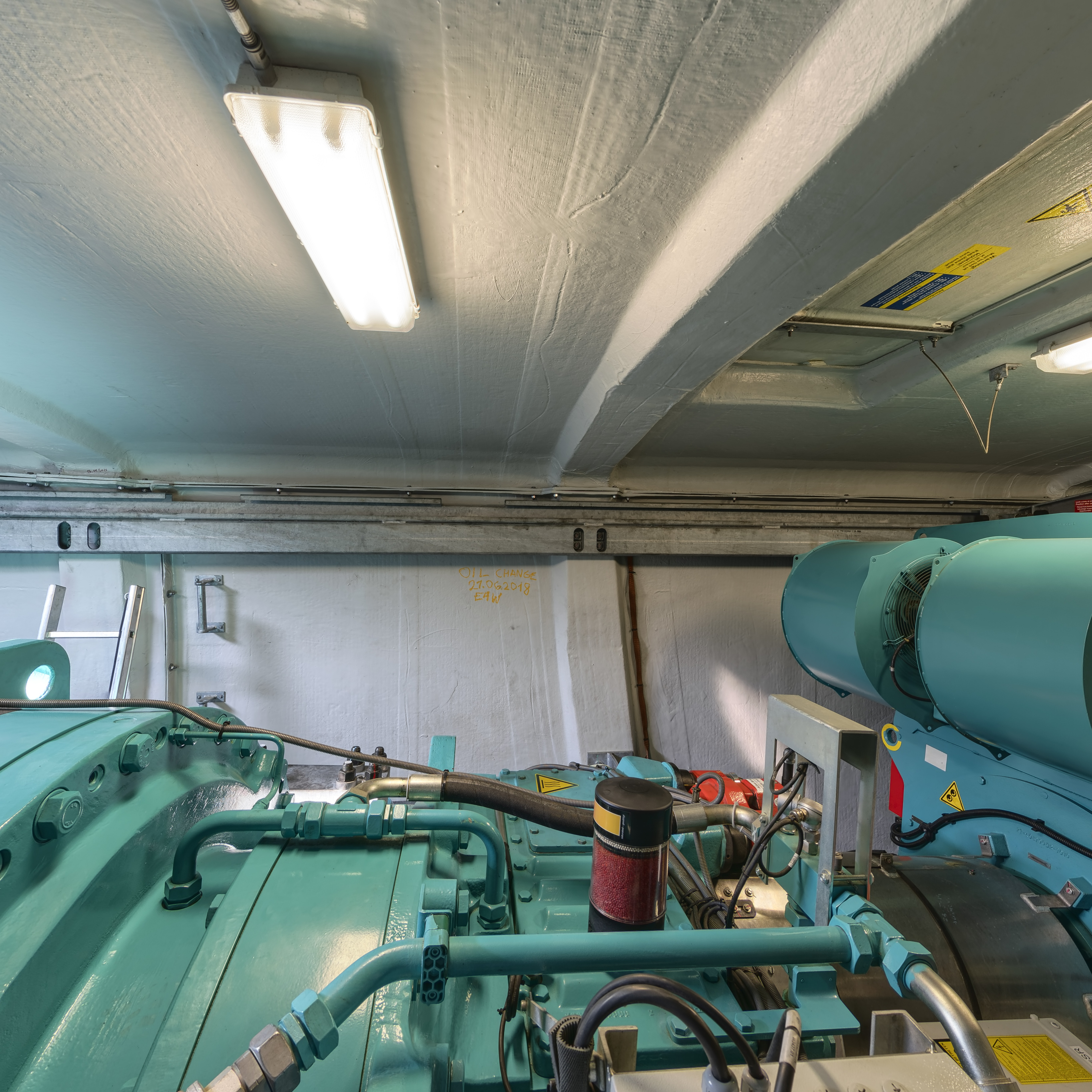
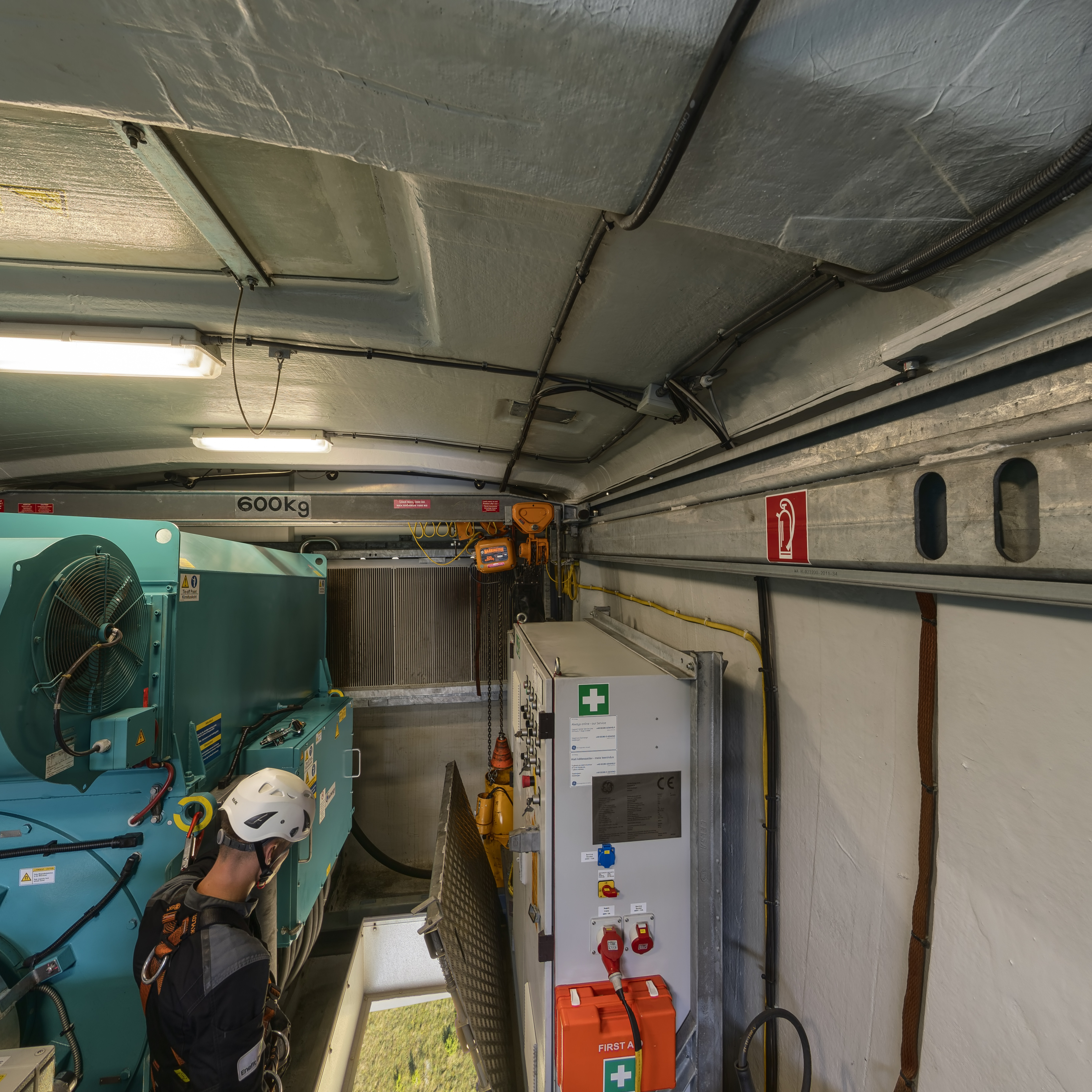
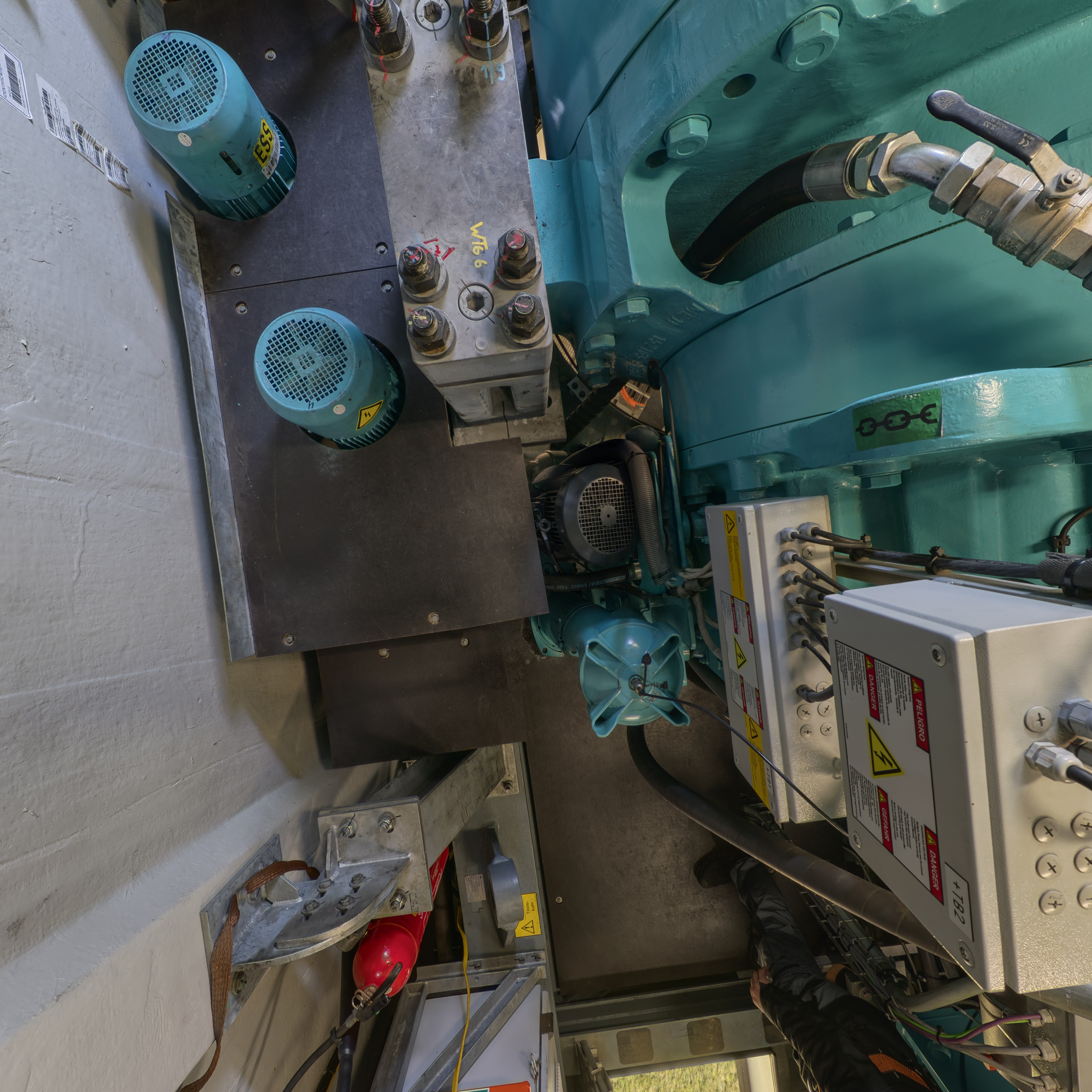
Interior view of a wind turbine nacelle

A nacelle /nəˈsɛl/ is a cover housing that houses all of the generating components in a wind turbine, including the generator, gearbox, drive train, and brake assembly.

A notable feature now found on some offshore wind turbines is a large sturdy helicopter-hoisting platform, or helideck, built on top of the nacelle, capable of supporting service personnel and their tools, winched down to the platform from a helicopter hovering above it. Wind turbine rotors are stopped, feathered and locked before personnel are dropped down to or picked up from the platforms.
