= Jade Wind Park =

Wind farm and wind turbine test site in Lower Saxony, Germany

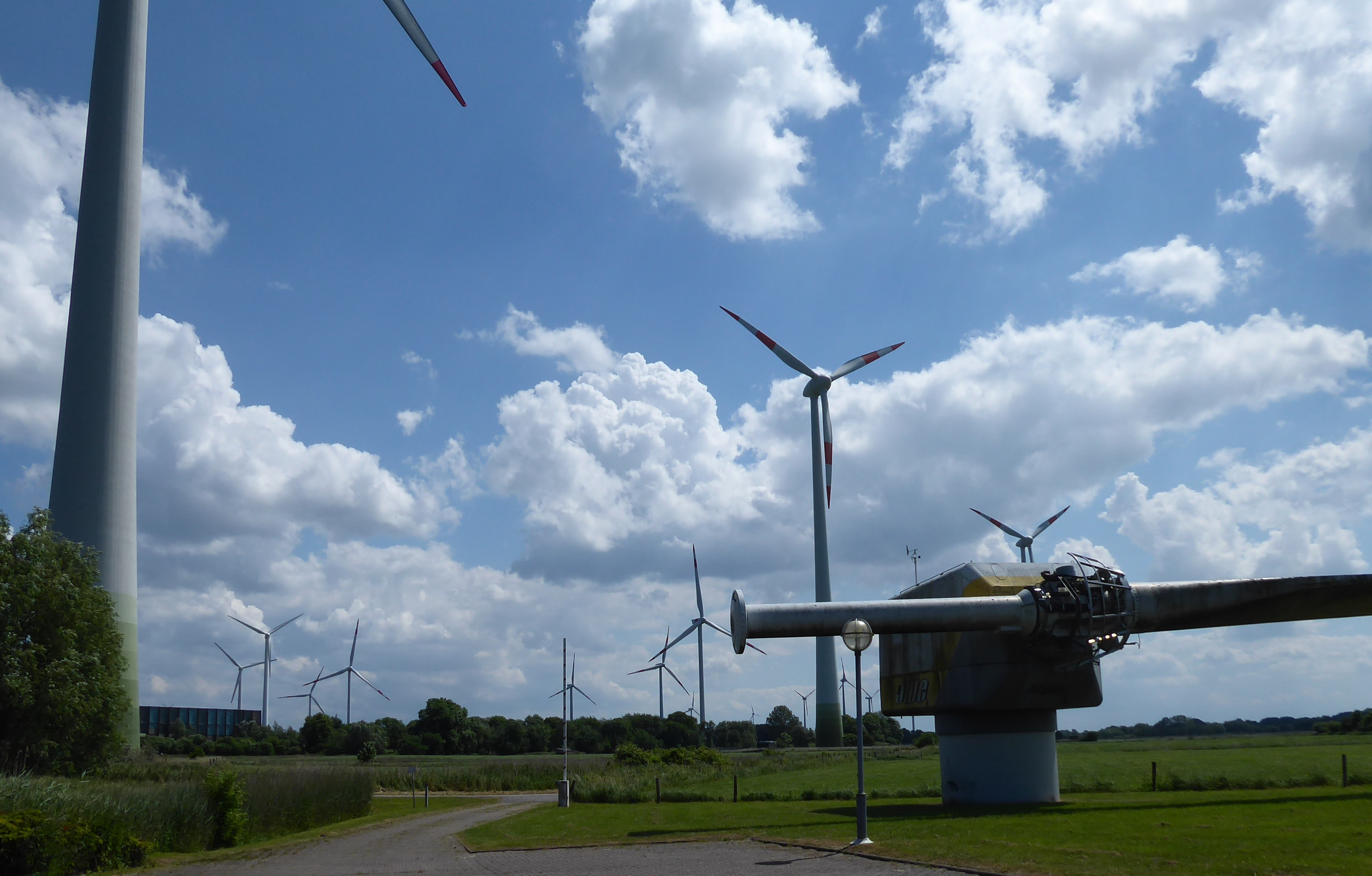
- Jade Wind Park, with a variety of wind turbines
- Country: Germany
- Coordinates: 53.3659°N 8.0303°E
- Status: Operational
- Commission date: 1989

Wind farm
- Type: Onshore

Power generation
- Units operational: 16
- Make and model: Various: 1 Enercon E-40; 3 Enercon E-66, 1.8-2.0MW; 2 Enercon E-70; 1 Enercon E-112; 1 Enercon E-115 E2; 2 eno energy 114; 1 Nordex N80; 1 Senvion MM82; 1 Siemens AN Bonus 2 MW; 1 Vestas V90; 1 Vestas V112
- Nameplate capacity: 40.7MW

External links
- Commons: Related media on Commons

Jade Wind Farm is a wind farm near Wilhelmshaven in Lower Saxony. It was built in 1989 as a test field for wind turbines in the area of the northern district Sengwarden. The wind farm is about 5 km away from the Innenjade. It is known for its range of types of wind turbines including the Aeolus II and Enercon E-112 and the single-blade MBB Monopteros M50 from different manufacturers.
